= European Scout Jamboree =

European large-scale youth event

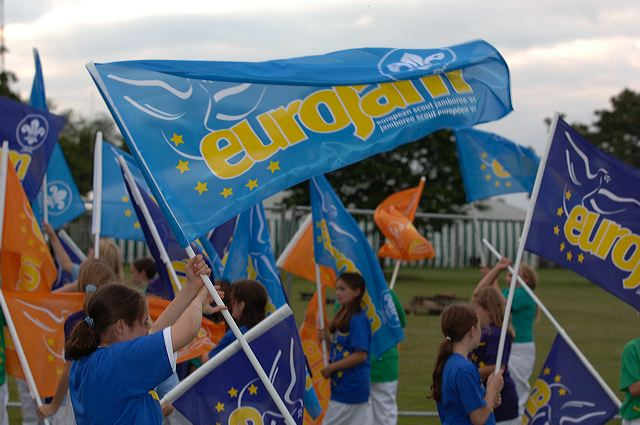
Flag bearers at the opening of EuroJam 2005

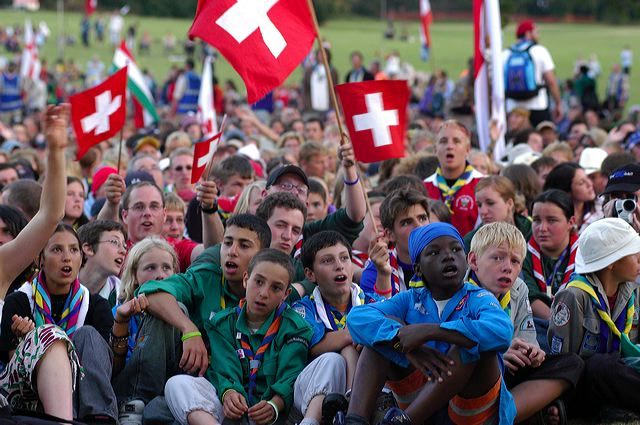
Closing ceremony of EuroJam 2005

The European Scout Jamboree (or EuroJam) is an international Scouting jamboree, which is organized at irregular times by the European Scout Region of the World Organization of the Scout Movement (WOSM).

So far, two European Scout Jamborees have been held as a dress rehearsal for the World Scout Jamborees to be held one or two years later at the same site, each with about 10,000 participants:

- EuroJam 1994 in Biddinghuizen, Dronten municipality, Flevoland, Netherlands
- EuroJam 2005 in Hylands Park, Chelmsford, England

== European Scout Jamboree 1994 ==
1st European Scout Jamboree (EuroJam)
- Owner: European Scout Region (World Organization of the Scout Movement)
- Location: Biddinghuizen
- Country: Netherlands
- Date: 1994

The first European Scout Jamboree was an initiative of the Dutch World Jamboree Organizing Committee. When Scouting Nederland won the bid of the 18th World Scout Jamboree, it was decided to organize a big event a year earlier, as a test run for such a big event. It was located in Biddinghuizen, on the same site as the 1995 World Jamboree. Its theme was Join the Stars.

== European Scout Jamboree 2005 ==
2nd European Scout Jamboree (EuroJam)
- Official Logo
- Owner: European Scout Region (World Organization of the Scout Movement)
- Location: Hylands Park
- Country: United Kingdom
- Date: 29 July to 10 August 2005
- Attendance: 10,000 Scouts of 67 Countries

The European Scout Jamboree 2005 (EuroJam 2005) was held in summer 2005 and lasted for 12 days between July 29 and August 10, in Hylands Park, Chelmsford, Essex, near Gilwell Park, an important campsite and training center for Scout Leaders. About 10,000 Scouts from 67 countries were involved; it was considered the biggest Scout gathering in Europe for over 10 years and 50 years in the United Kingdom. It was also a dry run allowing the organization team of the 21st World Scout Jamboree to test a number of aspects of the upcoming event. traffic issues, necessary infrastructures and logistics.

The event was made for Scouts and Guides aged 15–18 in summer 2005 from Europe and beyond.

There were five main groups of people at EuroJam. The different border colors of their official EuroJam scarves identified them.

- Participants used yellow border.
- Troop/Unit used green border.
- International Service Team (IST) used medium-blue border.
- Contingent, National and Regional Staff used navy-blue border.
- Jamboree Organizing Team (JOT) used purple border.

Sub-camps were "Home" areas for the duration of EuroJam. There were 8 sub-camps for participants, named after rivers and mountains in Europe. They were separated by "Hubs", Mountain Hub and River Hub.

Mountain Hub sub-camps: Alp, Carpathian, Pyrenees, Snowdonia. River Hub sub-camps: Danube, Oder, Rhine, Tagus. There was also an adult sub-camp, Lake Geneva.

The Plaza was the central area of the campsite, located in front of Hylands House. The Plaza was the location for all services that the participants needed during EuroJam. The Plaza included shops, cafés, an internet café, payphone, the EuroJam radio station and areas for the "Evening Programme"

The program was a wide range of activities on the main site and three off-site locations.

EuroVille was packed full of activities ranging from sports to music, from culture to technology, and from creativity to global development. There were five EuroVilles around the site, named after seas in Europe, Adriatic Sea, Baltic Sea, Irish Sea, Mediterranean Sea, and North Sea. EuroVille activities were specially created by Scouts and Guides from across Europe for EuroJam.

Global Development Village offered learning opportunities to participants aimed at bettering the world.

Choice Time provided participants with areas around the EuroJam campsite to meet new friends, and try out a range of walk-in activities. Participants could also explore other Programme areas as:

- Energise: Challenges and activities, covering topics such as survival, teamwork, relaxation and a full-size circus.
- Global Development Boulevard: A special exhibition area with display and drop-in activities for anyone to visit. Some of the tents had displays by organisations such as Oxfam to give the participants information of global issues, and other tent
- Village UK: An exhibition about the UK
- Faith and Beliefs Zone: A place set aside for participants to explore aspects of faith and beliefs. Represented religions were Buddhism, Islam, Catholicism, Anglicanism.

Touring the SubCamps were five specially-modified double-decker London Buses. Each GloBus had a different theme to introduce participants to topics affecting the world today.

== European Jamboree 2020 ==
After delegates to the World Scout Conference in Baku 2017 decided that the 25th World Scout Jamboree would take place in Korea in 2023, Scouts from almost 30 European countries requested the Polish Scouting Association to consider organizing Eurojam. European Scout organizations therefore set into motion that "European Jamboree 2020" will take place on Sobieszewo Island, in Gdańsk, Poland, with a target of 25,000 participants. The event was a collaboration between WOSM and WAGGGS' European Regions. The Polish Scouting and Guiding Association had earlier envisaged a Eurojam event in 2021 in preparation for hosting the World Jamboree in 2023.

In summer 2018 ZHP organized the Polish National Scout Jamboree, which was considered as a preparational event for the European Jamboree. By August 2019, the estimated attendance level was raised to 30,000 participants (youth and adult).

However, due to the COVID-19 pandemic, the event was initially postponed in April 2020 to summer of 2021, before being cancelled in November 2020.

== Other EuroJams ==
Other international Scout associations have also organized events under the name Eurojam, but generally have fewer participants. These agencies include the Confédération Européenne de Scoutisme (CES) and the Union Internationale des Guides et Scouts d'Europe (UIGSE).

=== UIGSE Eurojams ===
The Eurojams organized by UIGSE take place every 10 or so years. Past Eurojams are:

- Eurojam 1984 in Velles, Indre, France with 5000 participants
- Eurojam 1994 in Viterbo, Italy; Pope John Paul II received 7500 Scouts in the Basilica of St. Peter in Rome
- Eurojam 2003 on August 11, 2003 in Żelazko, Poland, with 8000 youths from fifteen European countries
- Eurojam 2014 in Saint-Evroult-Notre-Dame-du-Bois in Normandy, France, with 12500 participants

=== CES EuroJams ===
The EuroJams organized by the CES have been:

Year	Location	Host country	Theme/name	Attendance	Annotations
1981	Bramhope	United Kingdom	-	700	
1985	Niederhosenbach	Germany	Pierre de Lumière (Stone of Light)	> 600	
1989	Heeze	Netherlands	Environment and Pollution	~ 1,000	
1993	Olloy-sur-Viroin	Belgium	Tales and Legends	1,372	
1997	Bassano Romano	Italy	Let us help Europe to develop	1,645	
2002	Thoresby Hall	United Kingdom	Robin Hood and his merry men	417	planned for 2001 but postponed to 2002 due to the 2001 United Kingdom foot-and-mouth crisis
2006	Hauenstein	Germany	Vier Elemente (Four Elements)	401	originally planned for 2005 in Spain
2010	Villers-sur-Lesse	Belgium	Belgian comics	382	
2013	Ommen	Netherlands	That monster, that cursed monster! (Saint George and the dragon)	550	
2017	Covaleda	Spain		> 1,000	
2022	Hope	United Kingdom			

== See also ==
- World Scout Jamboree
