= European Scout Region (World Organization of the Scout Movement) =

Region of World Scouting

- Map of members or potential members of the European Scout Region (marked in blue). Andorra and Vatican City, with currently no recognized Scouting, and other countries outside the European Scout Region are marked in grey
- Owner: World Organization of the Scout Movement
- Headquarters: Geneva, Switzerland
- Membership: 2.1 million
- Chair: Diana Slabu; 2025 – 2028
- Regional Director: Abir Koubaa
- Vice Chair: José Pamplona; 2025 – 2028
- Website www.scout.org/europe/

The European Scout Region is one of five geographical subdivisions of the World Organization of the Scout Movement, headquartered in Geneva, Switzerland, with a satellite office in Brussels, Belgium.

It is considered a vital part of the global Scouting community, described as playing a pivotal role in shaping the future leaders of Europe. It is a european network of 47 National Scout Organizations, fostering a spirit of unity and camaraderie among young people across geographical and cultural boundaries. The region is not confined to Europe alone; it extends its reach to countries like Cyprus, Turkey, and Israel, reflecting the inclusive and diverse nature of Scouting. Through its various initiatives and programs, the European Scout Region is committed to promoting personal development, mutual understanding, and a sense of European citizenship among its members.

== Structure ==
=== Members ===
The European Scout Region comprises 47 National Scout Organizations that are members of the World Organization of the Scout Movement, and services Scouting in Western and Central and Eastern Europe, inclusive, for cultural reasons, of Cyprus (technically not part of Europe, but a member-state of the European Union) and Turkey (which spans across two continents), and, as a member of the United Nations' Western European and Others Group, Israel (despite being part of Asia due to them being barred in its own continent's organizations under the Arab-led boycott). The World Organization of the Scout Movement recognises at most one member organisation per country. Some countries have several organisations combined as a federation, with different component groups divided on the basis of religion (e.g., France and Denmark), ethnic identification (e.g., Bosnia-Herzegovina), or language (e.g., Belgium).

All the formerly communist states of Central and Eastern Europe and the Soviet Union have developed or are developing Scouting in the wake of the renaissance in the region. These include Albania, Bulgaria, East Germany, Hungary, Poland, Romania, and the successor states to Czechoslovakia, Yugoslavia and the Baltic nations independent of the former Soviet Union. Of these, Poland, the Czech Republic and Hungary have been successful in regrowing their Scout movements and are very well-developed, thanks in part to the existence of Scouts-in-Exile movements for the diaspora of each nation.

Country	Membership (from 2015)	Name of National Scout Organisation	Year current National Scout Organisation joined WOSM	Year National Scout Organisation was founded	Admits boys/girls
Austria	10,136	Pfadfinder und Pfadfinderinnen Österreichs	1922/1946	1912	both
Belgium	103,725	Guides and Scouts Movement of Belgium (federation of several associations)	1922	1911	both
Bosnia and Herzegovina	3,247	Savjet izviđačkih organizacija u Bosni i Hercegovini (federation of several associations)	1999	1999	both
Bulgaria	966	Organizatsia Na Bulgarskite Skauty	1999	1911–1913	both
Croatia	2,550	Savez izviđača Hrvatske	1993	1915	both
Cyprus	5,890	Cyprus Scouts Association	1961	1913	both
Czech Republic	51,234	Junák-český skaut	1922/1990/1996	1911	both
Denmark	43,282	Fællesrådet for Danmarks Drengespejdere (federation of several associations)	1922	1909	both
Estonia	1,346	Eesti Skautide Ühing	1922/1996	1911/1989	both
Finland	52,655	Suomen Partiolaiset – Finlands Scouter ry	1922	1910	both
France	76,342	Scoutisme Français (federation of several associations)	1922	1910	both
Germany	110,165	Ring deutscher Pfadfinder*innenverbände (federation of several associations)	1950	1910	both
Greece	18,643	Soma Hellinon Proskopon	1922	1910	both
Hungary	12,447	Magyar Cserkészszövetség	1922/1990	1912	both
Iceland	4,960	Bandalag Íslenskra Skáta	1924	1912	both
Ireland	44,982	Scouting Ireland	1949	1908	both
Israel	83,332	Hitachdut Hatsofim Ve Hatsofot Be Israel (federation of several associations)	1951	1920	both
Italy	102,904	Federazione Italiana dello Scautismo (federation of several associations)	1922/1946	1912	both
Latvia	872	Latvijas Skautu un Gaidu Centrālā Organizācija	1993	1917	both
Liechtenstein	702	Pfadfinder und Pfadfinderinnen Liechtensteins	1933	1931	both
Lithuania	1,881	Lietuvos Skautija	1997	1918	both
Luxembourg	6,327	Scouting in Luxembourg (federation of several associations)	1922	1914	both
Malta	3,100	The Scout Association of Malta	1966	1908	both
Monaco	374	Association des Guides et Scouts de Monaco	1990	1990	both
Montenegro	1,268	Savez Izviđača Crne Gore	2008	1956	both
Netherlands	57,516	Scouting Nederland	1922	1910	both
North Macedonia	1,483	Sojuz na Izvidnici na Makedonija	1997	1921	both
Norway	17,736	Speidernes Fellesorganisasjon (federation of several associations)	1922	1911	both
Poland	39,825	Związek Harcerstwa Polskiego	1922/1996	1918	both
Portugal	80,718	Federação Escotista de Portugal (federation of several associations)	1922	1913	both
Romania	4,000	Cercetaşii României	1993	1914	both
San Marino	260	Associazione Guide Esploratori Cattolici Sammarinesi	1990	1973	both
Serbia	4,168	Savez Izviđača Srbije	1995	1915	both
Slovakia	6,927	Slovenský skauting	1922/1990/1997	1913	both
Slovenia	6,524	Zveza tabornikov Slovenije	1994	1915	both
Spain	67,660	Federación de Escultismo en España (federation of several associations)	1922/1978	1912	both
Sweden	75,000	Scouterna	1922	1911	both
Switzerland	23,298	Swiss Guide and Scout Movement	1922	1912	both
Turkey	141,277	Türkiye İzcilik Federasyonu	1950	1910	both
United Kingdom	548,128	The Scout Association	1922	1907	both
Armenia	2,303	National Scout Movement of Armenia	1997	1912	
Azerbaijan		Association of Scouts of Azerbaijan	2000	1997	
Belarus	1,200	Republican Scout Association of Belarus	2010	1998	
Georgia	1,343	Sakartvelos Skauturi Modzraobis Organizatsia	1997	1994	both
Moldova	2,430	Organizația Națională a Scouților din Moldova	1997	1913	both
Ukraine	2,569	National Organization of the Scouts of Ukraine	2008	2007	both
Albania	390	Scouts of Albania	2024	2021	

==== Overseas branches ====
===== Denmark =====
- Faroe Islands – Føroya Skótaráð
- Greenland – Grønlands Spejderkorps

===== United Kingdom =====
- Gibraltar – The Scout Association of Gibraltar

==== Previous members ====
- Albania – In 2014, the membership of Beslidhja Skaut Albania was terminated by WOSM with hopes to establish a new National Scouting Organization. Scouts of Albania was admitted to WOSM in 2024.

==== Countries with no Scout organisation ====
- Andorra
- Vatican City

== Governance ==
=== European Regional Scout Conference ===
The European Scout Conference is the governing body of the European Scout Region and meets every three years. Its purposes are:

- To further the Scout Movement within the European Scout Region by promoting the spirit of world brotherhood, cooperation and mutual assistance amongst Scout associations within the Region;
- To foster the idea of a European citizenship, based on the conscience of a common heritage and destiny;
- To develop cooperation among European youth;
- To ensure proper implementation of the decisions and policies laid down by the World Organization of the Scout Movement, which affect the European Scout Region.

The 20th European Scout Conference was hosted by Guidisme et Scoutisme en Belgique and was held in Brussels, Belgium, from 17 to 21 July 2010.

The 21st European Scout Conference took place in Berlin, Germany, in August 2013, hosted by the Ring Deutscher Pfadfinderverbände.

The 22nd conference took place in 2016 in Norway. The 23rd conference took place in 2019 in Split, Croatia.

The 24th conference was hosted by Scouting Nederland. It took place in Rotterdam from 22 to 26 July 2022.

The 25th conference will be hosted in Austria in 2025 by Pfadfinder und Pfadfinderinnen Österreichs.

=== European Regional Scout Committee ===
The European Regional Scout Committee is the executive body of the European Regional Scout Conference and is composed of six elected volunteer members.

The functions of the European Regional Scout Committee are:

- To put into effect the resolutions of the European Regional Scout Conference and to fulfill any duty the European Regional Scout Conference may assign to it;
- To fulfill tasks the Constitution of the World Organization of the Scout Movement assigns to it;
- To act as an advisory body to the World Scout Committee;
- To act as an advisory body for member organisations of the European Scout Region requiring advice and assistance.

The members of the European Regional Scout Committee are elected for a three-year term by the European Regional Scout Conference, and may be re-elected for an immediate second term. The members, elected without regard to their nationality, do not represent their country or National Scout Organisation but the interests of the Scout Movement as a whole, similar to Members of the World Scout Committee.

The Regional Director (professional position) and the Treasurer of the European Scout Region (volunteer position) are ex-officio members of the European Regional Scout Committee. The Chairman of the European Scout Foundation also regularly attends meetings of the European Regional Scout Committee.

=== European Regional Scout Office ===
The European Regional Scout Office serves as secretariat of the European Scout Region and is one of six Regional Offices of the World Scout Bureau, the secretariat of the World Organization of the Scout Movement. A Regional Director heads the European Regional Scout Office and is assisted by a number of professional staff. Currently, the European Regional Scout Office has offices in Geneva, Switzerland and Brussels, Belgium.

=== European Regional Scout Plan 2010–2013 ===
In 2010, the 20th European Scout Conference adopted the European Regional Scout Plan 2010–2013, which summarises the Region's main areas of work, objectives and action planned for the triennium 2010–2013.

=== Working Groups and Core Groups ===
In order to achieve the objectives set out by the European Regional Scout Plan 2010–2013, five thematic Working Groups and three supporting Core Groups were set up in December 2010, composed of volunteers from different member organisations of the European Scout Region and supported by members of the European Regional Scout Committee and the European Regional Scout Office.

Working Groups:

- Growth through Quality
- Volunteering
- Embracing Change
- Youth Empowerment
- Partnerships with other Regions

Core Groups:

- Educational Methods (including Youth Programme and Adult Resources)
- Organisational Development
- External Relations and Funding

=== Regional Scouts administered directly by WOSM ===
The needs of Scout youth in unusual situations has created some interesting permutations, answerable directly to the World Scout Bureau. For years there was an active Boy Scouts of the United Nations in Geneva, as well as 84 Scouts of the European Coal and Steel Community, an early precursor to the European Union.

=== Cooperation ===
As one of the five geographical subdivisions of the World Organization of the Scout Movement the European Scout Region developed close relationships with a number of other Regions, in particular with the Arab Scout Region and the Africa Scout Region.

The European Scout Region also supports multilateral and bilateral relationships between National Scout Organisations of the European Scout Region with Scout associations of other Regions.

This region is the counterpart of the Europe Region of the World Association of Girl Guides and Girl Scouts (WAGGGS). The European Scout Region has a strong relationship with the Europe Region of WAGGGS. To further develop their relationship, the two Regions had a Joint Regional Office during the late 1990s in Brussels, Belgium, which was closed again in 1998.

An informal Joint Regional Committee composed of the two Regional Committees continues to discuss matters of mutual interest and supports the planning and running of joint youth activities and training events.

The two Regions also maintain a Joint Communication Platform (Europak), which provides information for member organisations of the European Scout Region and the Europe Region WAGGGS. Together published a monthly newsletter called Eurofax (this newsletter was already published by the European Scout Office before the joint office was opened, and reverted to WOSM when the joint office closed.

The European Scout Region represents the World Organization of the Scout Movement in a number of relevant inter-governmental institutions as well as non-governmental platforms in Europe. This includes, in particular, the European Youth Forum (YFJ), which operates within the Council of Europe and European Union areas and works closely with these two bodies. It is also represented in the Advisory Council on Youth of the Council of Europe and has regular contacts with relevant institutions of the European Union.

A WOSM joint Eurasian-and-European Scout meeting was held in Kyiv in April 2009.

In 2023, it was decided to dissolve the Eurasian Region, on 30 September. Ukraine, Moldova, Belarus, Georgia, Armenia, and Azerbaijan joined the European Region on 1 October, while Kazakhstan and Tajikistan joined the Asia-Pacific Region.

== Activities ==
The European Scout Region offers a number of sharing and training activities for its member organizations, a number of which are organised jointly with the Europe Region of WAGGGS. The main purpose of these activities is to provide opportunities for sharing and exchanging of experiences and best practices as well as training for adult volunteers and professionals involved in Scouting.

Among regularly held events are:

- The Academy – an annual sharing and training event for Scout and Guide associations in Europe
- The Symposium – held every three years in preparation of the European Scout Conference
- The Chief Volunteers and Chief Executives Meetings – networking events for people occupying similar positions
- The International Commissioners Forum – sharing and networking event held in preparation of the European Scout and Guide Conference
- Training Commissioners Meeting – networking event for people occupying similar positions
- Education Methods Forum – sharing and networking event for people involved in Youth Programme and/or Adult Resources

The European Scout Region also supports informal networks of member organisations of the European Scout Region which provide platforms for dialogue and exchange in specific areas:

- North-South Network – development and support of partnership projects between NSOs in Europe and, in particular, Africa
- Overture Network – sharing and networking of NSOs working in the area of diversity
- Odysseus Group (European Sea Scouting Network) – sharing, networking and training of NSOs engaged in Sea Scouting

=== European Scout Jamboree ===
The European Region of WOSM was the organizer of the European Scout Jamboree, which has been organized twice, in both cases as a dry run for a World Scout Jamboree organized in the same country within a few years. European jamborees were open to youth between the ages of 11 and 17, however many adults are involved as Scout leaders or as members of the IST (International Service Team),

Past European Scout Jamborees include:

- 1st European Scout Jamboree in Dronten, The Netherlands, 1994
- 2nd European Scout Jamboree in Hylands Park (Chelmsford, United Kingdom), 2005

The European Jamboree 2020, a joint event between WOSM and WAGGGS' European Regions, was planned to take place on Sobieszewo Island, in Gdańsk, Poland, with a target of 30,000 participants. However, due to the COVID-19 pandemic, the event was initially postponed in April 2020 to summer of 2021, before being cancelled in November 2020.

=== Roverway ===
Roverway is a joint activity of the European Region of WOSM and the Europe Region of WAGGGS, a ten-day event open for youth aged 16 to 22, who are members of the senior branches of member organisations of WOSM or WAGGGS. The activity was introduced in 2003 (as a follow-up to the Eurofolk event that existed from 1977 to 1997) and consists usually of two stages: a "journey" with small units of Scouts making their way to the main camp, which is the second stage.

Roverway is usually held every three years and hosted by a member organisation of the European Scout Region:

- Roverway 2003 in Leiria, Portugal; motto "People in motion"
- Roverway 2006 in Florence, Italy; motto: "Dare to share"
- Roverway 2009 in Úlfljótsvatn Scout Center, Iceland; motto: "Open up"
- Roverway 2012 in Evo, Hämeenlinna, National Campsite of the Guides and Scouts of Finland, Finland; motto: "See. Feel. Follow"
- Roverway 2016 in France; 2015 was skipped as not to overlap the 23rd World Scout Jamboree, per decision of the March 2011 meeting of the Joint Committee; motto: "Sur la Route", which translates 'On the Road".
- Roverway 2018 in International Scout and Guide Centre Zeewolde, the Netherlands; motto: "Opposites Attract"
- Roverway 2024 in Norway; jointly hosted by the Norges Speiderforbund and Norges KFUM-KFUK-speidere; motto: "NORTH of the Ordinary"; 2021 was skipped due to the planned WOSM/WAGGGS European Jamboree 2020
- Roverway 2028 in Switzerland

== Non-WOSM European Scouting ==
Two other multinational Europe-specific Scout organizations exist, not linked to WOSM, the only geographic area to have such. These are the Confédération Européenne de Scoutisme and the Union Internationale des Guides et Scouts d'Europe.

== See also ==
- Scouting 2007 Centenary
- Piet J. Kroonenberg
- Europe Region (World Association of Girl Guides and Girl Scouts)
