= Scouting and Guiding in Albania =

Scouting and Guiding associations in Albania

The Scout and Guide movement in Albania is served by

- Girl Scouts of Albania (Vajzat Udhëheqëse të Shqipërisë), member of the World Association of Girl Guides and Girl Scouts
- Scouts of Albania, an organization founded in 2021, which became a WOSM member in 2024.

The following organizations are defunct or their current status is unknown:

- Besa Skaut Albania, former member of WOSM (2002 to 2005) and original organization from which Beslidhja Skaut Albania spun off
- Beslidhja Skaut Albania, former member of the World Organization of the Scout Movement (WOSM) (2005 to 2014)
- Shoqata Skaut Shqipëtarë, spin-off of Beslidhja Skaut Albania
- Shoqata e Guidave dhe Skoutëve në Shqipëri, formerly working towards membership in the World Association of Girl Guides and Girl Scouts
- Udhëhequset dhe Skautistet e Europes with contacts to the Union Internationale des Guides et Scouts d'Europe

== See also ==
- Scouting and Guiding in Kosovo
