= Vierves-sur-Viroin Castle =

Castle in Vierves-sur-Viroin, Belgium

Coordinates: 50.079°N 4.634°E

- Belgium
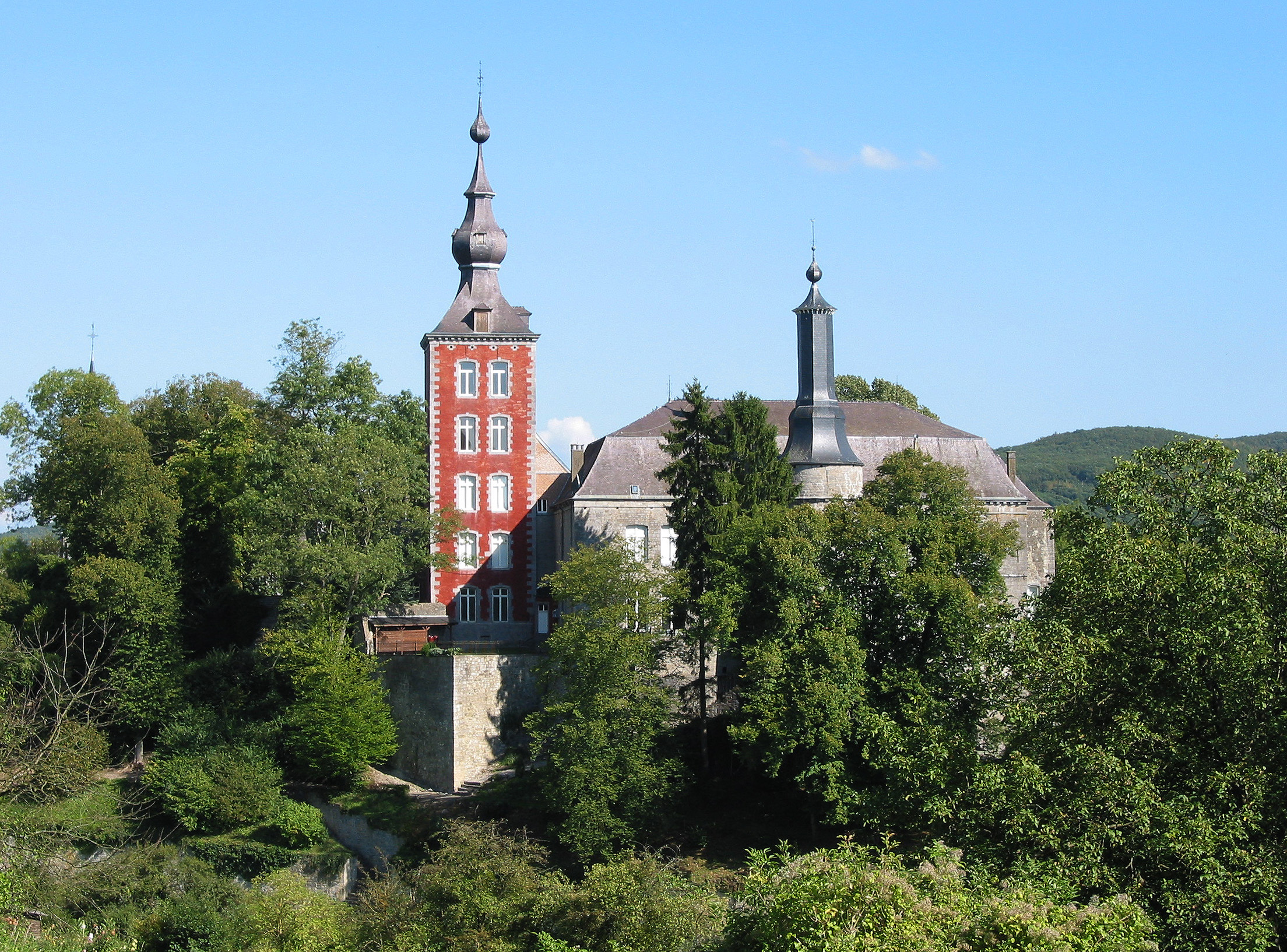
- Vierves-sur-Viroin castle (XV-XIXth centuries).

Site information
- Type: Castle

Vierves-sur-Viroin Castle is a castle in Vierves-sur-Viroin (Viroinval), Belgium. The castle is not open to the public.

== History ==
The seigneury of Vierves, which became a barony in the 15th century, was under the jurisdiction of the Prince-Bishopric of Liège, having previously belonged to the County of Namur, and encompassed Matagne-la-Grande, Le Mesnil, Treignes, and Vierves.
The Lords of Vierves were also Viscount of Anseremme in the 11th century. The title passed to the Barons of Hamal from 1567 onwards. They were a very powerful family, high bailiffs of the Entre-Sambre-et-Meuse region under French rule, transferred in 1815 to the Province of Namur.

The feudal castle played an important military role until the 17th century. Burned down around 1762, the castle was rebuilt as it can be seen today.

== See also ==
- List of castles in Belgium
