= Association of Armenian Scouts =

- Association of Armenian Scouts
- Founded: 1929
- Defunct: January 9, 1998
- Founder: Kourkène Medzadourian

The Association of Armenian Scouts (Armenian: Հայ Արի, Haï Ari, alternately Association des Scouts Armeniens) was the Armenian Scouting in Exile movement recognized by the World Organization of the Scout Movement. In 1929 the Association of Armenian Scouts, centered in Paris, was given recognition as a member of the International Conference. Haï Ari was a member of the World Organization of the Scout Movement from 1929 to 1997. The organization was recognized in exile, with headquarters and approximately 1,100 members in France.

== History ==
Scouting in Armenia was founded in 1912, then later developed abroad among the refugees who had survived the genocide of 1915-1916 and among those that had fled the communist takeover of Armenia in 1920, at which point Scouting ceased to exist in Armenia.

Dr. Kourkène Medzadourian, Chief Scout of Armenia, moved to France, where troops of Armenian Scouts were established in large cities.

In 1929, World Scouting recognized the Association of Armenian Scouts, Haï Ari, based in France. While the Association did not have its own territorial base, it was the exception to the rule, remaining a member of the World Organization and the European Scout Region.

In April 1939, J. S. Wilson paid a visit in Paris for the tenth anniversary of the recognition of the Association of Armenian Scouts.

At its meeting in 1945, the International Committee considered the standing of the two non-territorial National Scout Organizations, the Association des Scouts Armeniens and the Association Nationale des Scouts Russes. It was proved that the Armenian organization was very much alive, and that it had members in various countries, some of whom could not be recognized as Scouts without the existence of the Armenian organization. The same did not appear to be the case with the Russian Scouts, whose membership had dwindled and seemed to be confined to displaced persons (DP) camps. The Committee felt that the continued registration of the Association Nationale des Scouts Russes was not justified. The policy adopted in 1947 and reaffirmed in 1949 remained as it was until 1957, when the Committee decided to reconsider the whole question of policy in view of changed conditions.

In 1994, National Scout Movement of Armenia (Hayastani Azgayin Scautakan Sharjum Kazmakerputiun, HASK) was born. The French-based Association of Armenian Scouts withdrew from membership in order to allow Scouting in Armenia to join the World Organization. Membership in the World Organization passed to HASK on April 18, 1997.

The former refugee organization disbanded on January 9, 1998.

== Ideals ==
The Scout Motto was Misht Badrast (Միշտ Պատրաստ) meaning 'always ready' in Armenian.

The Scout emblem incorporated the national colors as well as Mount Ararat, also an element of the coat of arms of Armenia.

== See also ==
- Scouting in Armenia
