= Scouting and Guiding in Armenia =

Scouting and Guiding Organizations in Armenia

The Scout and Guide movement in Armenia is served by

- Hayastani Azgayin Skautakan Sharjum Kazmakerputiun, member of the World Organization of the Scout Movement
- National Association of Girl Guides and Girl Scouts of Armenia, member of the World Association of Girl Guides and Girl Scouts
- Armenian General Benevolent Union

Because of Armenia's longstanding diaspora, there are several extranational Armenian Scout and Scout-like organizations. Expatriate Armenian Scout associations include the three traditional Armenian diaspora political groupings the Dashnaks, Hnachags and the Ramgavar:

- Hai Ari (1929–1998); World Organization of the Scout Movement membership withdrawn in 1997 in favor of Hayastani Azgayin Skautakan Sharjum Kazmakerputiun
- Homenetmen - connected to the Armenian Revolutionary Federation (Dashnak Party)
- Homenmen - connected to the Social Democrat Hunchakian Party
- Armenian Young Men's Society-Hoyetchmen and Armenian Young Men's Society-Armenagan in Jerusalem - both connected to the Armenian Democratic Liberal Party (Ramgavar Party)
- Armenian Young Men's Association in Nicosia

Most of the expatriate groups are also integrated in the national Scout or Guide organizations of their host countries.

== History ==
The first Armenian Scouting groups were organized in 1910 in orphanages in Van, present day Turkey. and continued until 1922 when Scouting was officially banned and the Young Pioneers became the official state youth organization in Armenia. But even after 1922 some Scout troops were left for a short period in Armenia, now part of the Transcaucasian Socialist Federative Soviet Republic. Armenian Scouting in Turkey was active also after the Armenian genocide and even new troops were founded, but it caused them much misery. In 1920 there were 20 Armenian Scout troops in Constantinople with 750 Scouts and 50 Girl Scouts.

In Egypt the first Armenian Scout troops were founded in 1912 in Cairo and Alexandria. In the years after World War I more Scout troops in the diaspora were founded i.e. within Homenetmen in Bulgaria and Romania.

In the Lebanon Homenetmen Scout troops were founded in orphanages for survivors of the Armenian Genocide.

In Paris Kourkène Medzadourian founded the first Armenian Scout troop in 1924. More troops were founded in France and a very good relationship with French Scouting was created. They formed the Scout association Haï Ari and became a recognized member of the World Brotherhood. Haï Ari had members of Armenian descent in France, Belgium, other European and South American countries. Scouts of this association took part in many international Scouting events such as Rover Moots and Jamborees i.e. in the 3rd World Scout Jamboree with 40 Scouts. Further more there were Homenetmen Scouts and other Armenian Scout groups, which belonged to the National Scout Organisations of their country of residence and were in this way also registered at the International Bureau. This was the case i.e. in Egypt, Cyprus, Greece, Bulgaria, Australia, Lebanon and Syria.

Homenetmen Scouts were active in Turkey, in various countries in the Middle East, in Greece and other countries of the Balkan peninsula.

An Armenian Scout troop was founded in Geneva in 1928. During that years Armenian Scout troops were also active in the Netherlands for some years.

In the 1940s the Armenian General Benevolent Union (AGBU) formed its first Scout troops in Lebanon, Syria and Egypt. During the following years Scout groups within the AGBU around the world followed.

In 1989 the first Scout groups were founded in Armenia again.

1994 saw the formation of the Armenian National Scout Movement Hayastani Azgayin Scautakan Sharjum Kazmakerputiun. In order to permit entry into the World Organization for Scouting in Armenia, Haï Ari withdrew membership in the World Organization, which passed to HASK on April 18, 1997. Haï Ari was disbanded on January 9, 1998.

Today Armenian Scouting is active within Armenia and the diaspora and there are strong links between both.

== International Scouting units in Armenia ==
In addition, there are USA Girl Scouts Overseas in Yerevan, serviced by way of USAGSO headquarters in New York City.

== See also ==
- Scouting in displaced persons camps
