= Scouts of Albania =

Organization in the Republic of Albania

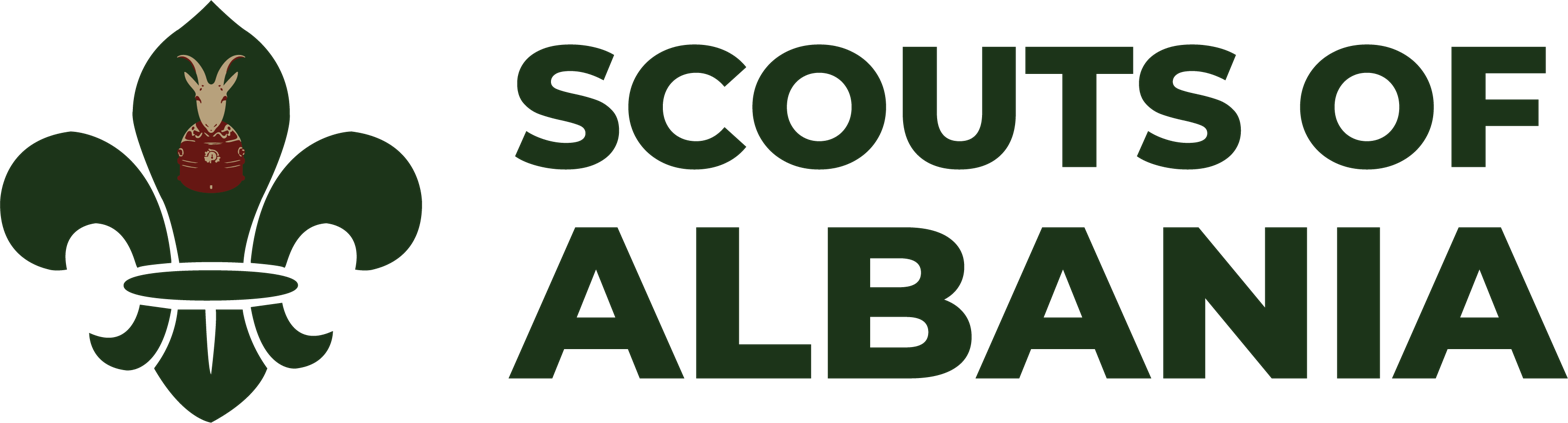
- Headquarters: Tirana
- Country: Albania
- Founded: 2021
- Membership: 599
- Affiliation: World Organization of the Scout Movement; European Scout Region
- Website scouts.org.al

Scouts of Albania (Albanian: 'Skautët Shqiptarë) is a scouting organization in Albania, established in 2021, which became a member of the World Organization of the Scout Movement in August 2024.

== History ==
Scouting in Albania traces back to 1920, when it was first founded. In 1922, Albania was among the founders of the World Organization of the Scout Movement, remaining active until 1937 when Zog of Albania banned Scouting in Albania. After World War II, the Socialist People's Republic of Albania had the Pionieret e Enverit, the Pioneers of Enver Hoxha, a local variant of the Pioneers. Scouting quickly returned to Albania in 1989 after communism collapsed in the country, in Sarandë by Dolores and Mihal Dhima, International Commissioner and Chief Scout of Besa Scouts Albania, respectively.

In July 1999, WOSM accepted Besa Skaut Albania as a member organisation. The membership of the organization was terminated by the World Scout Committee in 2005 due to the actions of the Dhima family who used the organization for their own monetary and political ends. WOSM membership was then granted to Beslidhja Skaut Albania, an offshoot of the older organization formed from disaffected members of the previous National Committee of Besa Skaut Albania. In November 2014, WOSM terminated membership of Beslidhja Skaut Albania for their inability to fulfil its basic constitutional and educational requirements, with a statement supporting the establishment of a new National Scout Organization in Albania.

In 2019, the European Scout Region began to support the development of a new National Scout Organization in Albania with no ties to Beslidhja Skaut Albania, with a strategic and sustainable approach to growth leading to a unified, co-educational, multi-ethnic and inter-religious movement in the country, and putting the organisation on a path towards full membership status. Scouts of Albania was founded in 2021 and legally registered in the Court of Tirana in September 2023.

Scouts of Albania applied for membership of the World Organization of the Scout Movement in May 2024. The World Scout Committee recommended for the member organization of WOSM to accept the application. In August 2024, Scouts of Albania was declared the 176th member organization of WOSM during the 43rd World Scout Conference in Cairo, Egypt.

As of August 2024, Scouts of Albania membership includes 390 children, 160 adults and 49 Scout leaders spread across the country. In addition to the capital, Tirana, Scouts of Albania is active in regions such as Berat, Diber, Elbasan, Fier, Kukës, and Shkoder.

== Program and Ideals ==
Scouts of Albania is divided into four age sections and adult leaders:

- Simba (7-10 years old)
- Skautët (11-14 years old)
- Eksploruesit (15-18 years old)
- Roverët (18-29 years old)
- Veteranët (Adults in Scouting, 30+ years old)

The Scout Motto of Scouts of Albania is Ji i Përgatitur, "Be Prepared" in Albanian.

The membership badge of Scouts of Albania incorporate the helmet of Gjergj Kastrioti, Albania's national hero.

== See also ==
- Scouting and Guiding in Albania
