= Teruko Wada =

- Born: 和田 照子; October 31, 1969 (age 55)
- Education: Graduate School of Law and Politics of the University of Tokyo; Waseda University; Knox College; Georgetown University, 2004
- Occupation(s): former President of the Girl Scouts of Japan a member of the World Board of the World Association of Girl Guides and Girl Scouts since 2011; Senior Manager at the Japan Business Federation

Teruko Wada (和田 照子, Wada Teruko) (born October 31, 1969, Nagano, Nagano prefecture), Japan is an attorney and former President of the Girl Scouts of Japan, a member of the World Board of the World Association of Girl Guides and Girl Scouts since 2011, and Senior Manager at the Japan Business Federation.

Wada led disaster relief fundraising efforts in the aftermath of the 2011 Tōhoku earthquake and tsunami, and under her guidance, Girl Scouts of Nagano started a project to support children with needs in partnership with Armenian Girl Guides of the National Union of Girl Guides and Girl Scouts of Armenia.

She studied at the Graduate School of Law and Politics of the University of Tokyo, as well as Waseda University and Knox College. She lives in Shinjuku-ku, Tokyo. She was admitted, or permitted to practice law, in New York State in 2004 via Georgetown University.

Preceded by	President of the Girl Scouts of Japan -2013	Succeeded by
