= Eurofolk =

Eurofolk, a European Scout event for Rover Scouts, was a cultural festival organized every four years between 1977 and 1997 by the European Scout Committee of the World Organization of the Scout Movement and the European Guide Committee of the World Association of Girl Guides and Girl Scouts.

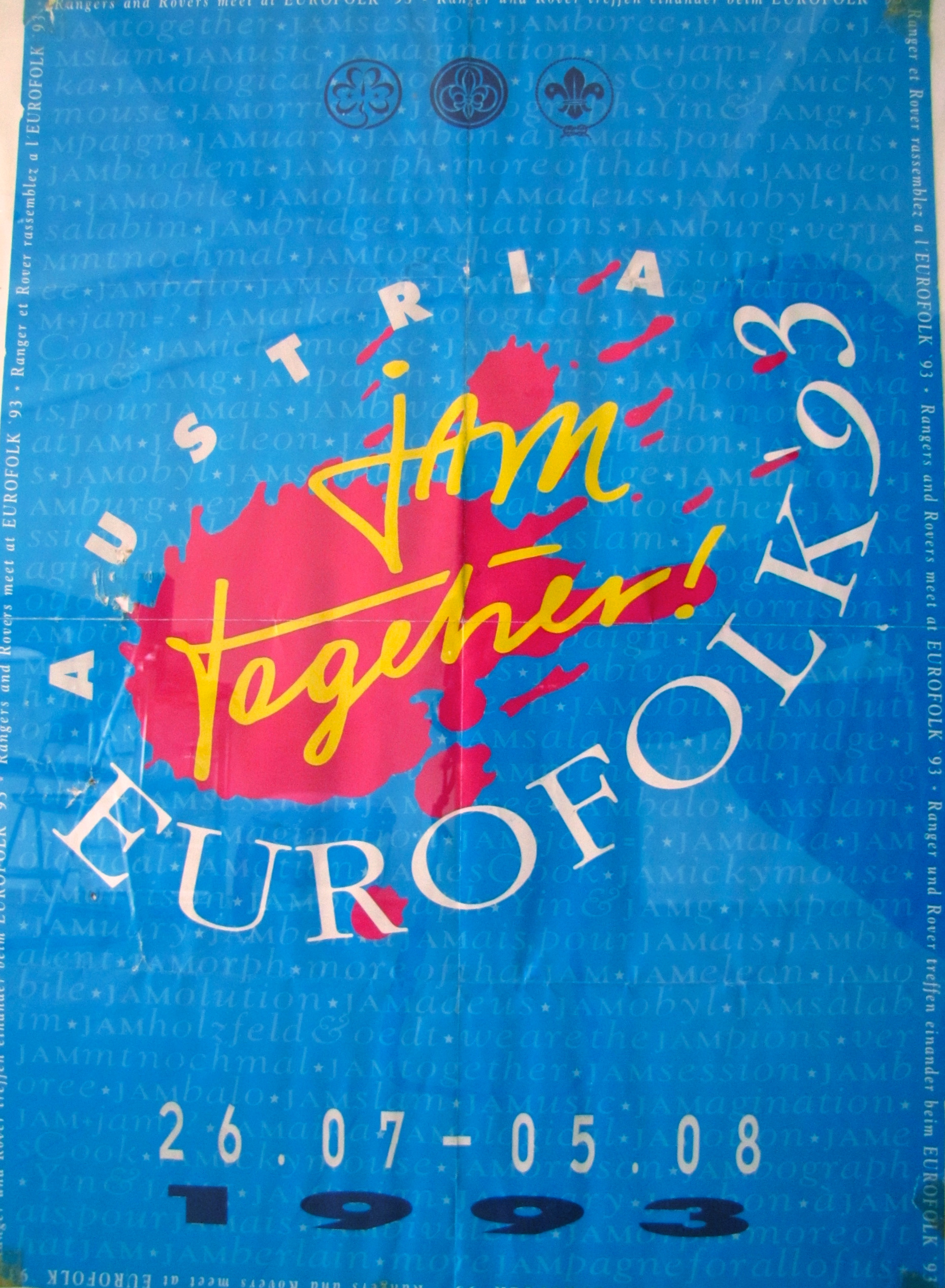
Eurofolk '93 Poster

The single events were held in several countries. EuroFolk has been integrated into the Europe For You ! programme from 1996, involving the last event, held in 1997.

== Lista ==
N°	Year	Place	Date	Participants
1°	1977	Efeso (Turkey)	2–10 August	?
2°	1981	Westernohe (Germany)	10–20 August	?
3°	1985	Torrebonica, Terrassa (Spain)	27 July - 4 August	1500
4°	1989	Romano d'Ezzelino (Italy)	30 July - 9 August	2800
5°	1993	Sankt Georgen im Attergau (Austria)	26 July - 5 August	2500
6°	1997	Lovanio (Belgium)	21 July – 2 August	1000

The principles of its organization were simple: in preparation for the event, participating groups prepared their selected items: dances, music, songs, pantomimes, games, costumes or cultural shows. Once at the camp, they shared the folklore and traditions of their respective countries or regions with others, and at the same time they learned new aspects of other cultures in workshops. A wide variety of workshops was offered, including painting, drawing, weaving, spinning, singing, dancing, selfexpression through movement, glass-blowing, dressmaking and cookery. Usually, local artists and craftsmen led the workshops. The number of participants ranged from 1,000 to 3,000.

The Festival has laid the groundwork of European awareness among young people, mainly the 1993 and 1997 events, that came after the demolition of Berlin Wall (09.11.1989) and the Maastricht Treaty (07.02.1992), getting benefit from the new social atmosphere of communion and friendship beyond frontiers, although the last event in Belgium, in terms of attendance, suffered the competition with the world youth day in Paris.

With the increase in intolerance, xenophobia and racism in Europe, in the new millennium there was still a clear need to provide young people with opportunities to experience and appreciate cultural diversity, as well as to learn about current issues and acquire useful skills for their personal and professional lives. However, the name and form of "Eurofolk" needed to be reviewed and the concept developed further to ensure that it meets the needs of today's young people. For this reason, participants (more than 40 representatives of Scout and Guide associations in 25 countries) at the seminar in Olympos, Turkey, from 20-26 May 2000 were asked to develop a new concept of a European event for young people aged 16-22. They proposed the name "RoverWay" and provided input and guidelines for the new event, that took place for the first time in 2003, in Portugal.
