= Girl Scouts of Albania =

Vajzat Udhëheqëse të Shqipërisë
- Girl Scouts of Albania
- Country: Albania
- Affiliation: World Association of Girl Guides and Girl Scouts
- Website https://www.facebook.com/girlscoutsalbania/

Vajzat Udhëheqëse të Shqipërisë (VUSh, Girl Scouts of Albania, literally Albania's Girl Leaders) is one of Albania's Scouting and Guiding organizations. In January 2017, VUSh chose board members and in April, a World Association of Girl Guides and Girl Scouts evaluation delegation visited Albania to assess VUSh's potential to become an associate member. The organization was recognized as an associate member by the WAGGGS at the 36th WAGGGS World Conference held in New Delhi in September 2017, in tandem with Niger and at the same time Syria, Aruba, Azerbaijan and Palestine became full members. As of September 2017, over 200 6-16-year-old girls have joined the movement in 10 cities including Berat, Vlora, Librazhd, Peqini, Fier, and Rrëshen.

VUSh International Commissioner Lusiana Mailaj said, "It has not been easy, but VUSh has managed to create value within the community within a short time. I am very proud to be part of these values and gratefully for this moment" at the 36th World Conference.

The membership badge of Vajzat Udhëheqëse të Shqipërisë incorporates the double-headed eagle of the arms of Gjergj Kastriot Skanderbeg featured on the emblem of Albania.

== See also ==
- Shoqata e Guidave dhe Skoutëve në Shqipëri
- Beslidhja Skaut Albania
