= Tadano Makuzu =

Tadano Makuzu 只野真葛
- Born: 1763; Edo
- Died: 1825; Sendai
- Occupation(s): Intellectual and author
- Parent: Kudō Heisuke

Tadano Makuzu (只野 真葛; 1763–1825), daughter of an Edo physician, wrote commentaries on Japan's social and political problems.

== Early life ==
Tadano Makuzu was born in 1763 as Kudō Ayako, the oldest daughter of Kudō Heisuke. Kudō Heisuke was a late-eighteenth century physician representing the Sendai domain in Edo. At the age of thirteen, Heisuke became the adopted son of Kudō Jōan, who was a physician of the retired lord of Sendai, Date Yoshimura. In 1754, Heisuke, a man in his twenties, inherited the physician position from his father. As Heisuke aged, he was known for his unprejudiced hospitality. He had guests from all different classes including "scholars, poets, actors, and ... even gamblers" (Gramlich-Oka, 2001: 3–4). In addition to his hospitality, Kudō Heisuke was commonly revered for his extensive knowledge of Russia. As a result of his widespread knowledge on Russian affairs, Heisuke became acquainted with "the circle of rangakusha" (Gramlich-Oka, 2001: 3–4). Heisuke knew that Japan needed to expand its knowledge base to the methods of countries other than itself even before the United States of America forced Japan to open its doors (Timperley, 1942: 346). As a revolutionary figure, Kudō Heisuke was also a part of the heroes, which was a small group that consisted of late Tokugawa anti-seclusionists. This group, which included "such figures as...Hayashi Shihei, Honda Rimei, Hirayama Kozo, Sato Shinen, Hashimoto Sanai, and Yoshida Shoin," shared views of expanding the Japanese empire (Conroy, 1951: 33). However, one of their most important concerns was protecting Japan from Russia (Conroy, 1951: 33).

Heisuke was one of the great minds that had knowledge on how to attempt to help protect Japan from Russia. In the eighteenth century, Heisuke believed that an establishment of trade relations with Russia was unavoidable, yet he was also aware that having such a relationship with Russia would prove to be beneficial to Japan in many ways. From this relationship, Japan could gain knowledge from the world outside Japan on how to improve itself while also acquiring knowledge on how to prepare itself for when Russia would come back to fight (Timperley, 1942: 346). During his life, Heisuke also published a book by the name of Akaezo fūsetsu kō, meaning Report on the Land of the Red Ainu (i.e. Russia), in which Heisuke addressed a rumor at the time of Russia's plans of raiding Ezo (Hokkaidō). As a precautionary measure, Heisuke advised that Japan should make movements to start developing and colonizing Ezo in order to prohibit Russian expansion into Ezo. In response to Heisuke's advice on Ezo, Tanuma Okitsugu, a member of the rōjū, attempted to begin colonization of Ezo yet was removed from office in 1786, and the development of Ezo ceased (Gramlich-Oka, 2001: 4–5). Tanuma's removal also affected Makuzu.

Growing up in Sukiyachō, Nihonbashi, Makuzu had a privileged childhood and due to her father's involvement, had been exposed to much more than an ordinary Japanese girl. At the age of sixteen, Makuzu left her home and "entered the service of Princess Akiko, [who was the] daughter of Date Shigemura" (Gramlich-Oka, 2001: 4–5). During her time of service to Princess Akiko, Akiko married "into the Ii family of the Hikone domain" (Gramlich-Oka, 2001: 4–5). Loyal to her mistress, Makuzu followed Akiko to the Ii residence in Edo. In 1787, at the age of twenty-five, Makuzu left the service and returned to her parents' house (Gramlich-Oka, 2001: 5–6).

== Marriage and family ==
As a result of Tanuma's removal from office, Kudō Heisuke's plans for finding Makuzu's marriage partner began to fall apart. However, in 1787 at the age of twenty-five, Makuzu married a retainer of the Sakai family from Tsuruoka domain, who happened to be much older than Makuzu. During her marriage, Makuzu became extremely miserable until the point where she was returned to her parents' house. Over the next couple of years, Makuzu experienced a host of poignant events, which included the deaths of her grandmother, brother, three sisters, and mother. After the period of death, the remarried Heisuke was able to find Makuzu a second husband by the name of Tadano Iga Tsurayoshi. Iga was a high-ranking Date retainer and had been married before as well. In 1797, Makuzu married Iga and moved to his domain of Sendai, which was the domain where Makuzu was original from. Yet surprisingly, although they were married for fifteen years, Iga was only allowed to come to Sendai sixteen times to see Makuzu. Sadly, in 1800, Heisuke died due to illness leaving the pressure of continuing the Kudō family name on the last son, Genshirō. However, seven years later, Genshirō died. In attempt to continue the Kudō name, a cousin was adopted as a successor. Although the Kudō name lived on through the successor, the cousin "sold everything in the household" to pay off debt. Needless to say, Makuzu found the cousin's reckless actions quite upsetting (Gramlich-Oka, 2001: 6–8).

== Education and career ==
Makuzu's education contributed to her production a number of works in her lifetime. Due to her reputation of critiquing literary and Confucian studies, "Makuzu [was] often considered to belong to the nativist school" (Gramlich-Oka, 2001: 2). Scholars described Makuzu's education as "learning based on experience" (Gramlich-Oka, 2001: 2). Kada no Tamiko was Makuzu's first formal teacher, who "taught her to read and write in the style of Heian classics, such as Kokinshū and Ise monogatari" (Gramlich-Oka, 2001: 13). From then, Makuzu was trained in waka poetry, in which she became quite a popular poet with her influence reaching as far as Edo. Then, at the age of forty-nine, Makuzu wrote Mukashibanashi, the work that is she best known for today. In Mukashibanashi, Makuzu tried to "provide a remembrance of [her] mother for her sister Teruko, who was still a child when [their] mother died" and "make her father’s name known to the world" (Gramlich-Oka, 2001: 8–13) Six years after starting Mukashibanashi, Makuzu started her next project writing Hitori kangae, in which she addressed her "often unconventional views on issues ranging from the sources of the economic problems of the warrior class to relations between men and women" (Gramlich-Oka, 2001: 9 and Tadano, 2001b: 173).

== Sources ==
=== Books ===
- Gramlich-Oka, Bettina. (2006). Thinking like a man: Tadano Makuzu (1763–1825). Leiden: Brill Publishers. ISBN 978-90-04-15208-3; OCLC 67346291

=== Articles ===
- Conroy, Hilary. "Government versus 'Patriot': The Background of Japan's Asiatic Expansion." The Pacific Historical Review 20: 1 (Feb., 1951): 31–42.
- Gramlich-Oka, Bettina. "Tadano Makuzu and Her Hitori Kangae." Monumenta Nipponica 56: 1 (Spring, 2001): 1-20.
- Tadano Makuzu; Janet R. Goodwin; Bettina Gramlich-Oka; Elizabeth A. Leicester; Yuki Terazawa; Anne Walthall. "Solitary Thoughts: A Translation of Tadano Makuzu's Hitori Kangae." Monumenta Nipponica 56: 1 (Spring, 2001): 21–38.
- Tadano Makuzu; Janet R. Goodwin; Bettina Gramlich-Oka; Elizabeth A. Leicester; Yuki Terazawa; Anne Walthall. "Solitary Thoughts: A Translation of Tadano Makuzu's Hitori Kangae." Monumenta Nipponica 56: 2 (Summer, 2001): 173–195.
- Timperley, H. J. 1942. "Yoshida Shoin Martyred Prophet of Japanese Expansionism." The Far Eastern Quarterly 1: 4 (Aug. 1942): 337–347.
