= Confederation of European Scouts =

Scouting organization in Belgium

- Headquarters: Belgium
- Country: International
- Founded: 12 November 1978
- President: Wouter Aarts
- Website; Confederation of European Scouts

The Confederation of European Scouts, called in French Confédération Européenne de Scoutisme and abbreviated as CES, was formed in Brussels, Belgium, on 12 November 1978 and is still based in Belgium. CES stresses the European dimension of the Scouting programme and claims to provide the "authentic Scouting of Baden-Powell". The CES is a confederation of national federations. The CES is a split-off from the Fédération du Scoutisme Européen (FSE) later renamed to the Union Internationale des Guides et Scouts d'Europe; it left after controversies about the importance of religious elements in the single associations' programs and co-education. The exact number of members of the CES is unknown.

== Member organizations ==
CES has national federations in:

- Belgium - Europe et Scoutisme - 10 groups (3 Sea Scout groups)
- Germany - Bund Europäischer Pfadfinder (BEP, founded 1952) - 3 groups
- Italy - Federazione Scautistica Italiana - Federazione del Movimento Scout Italiano (FSI) - federation with one member organization:
  - Associazione Scautistica Cattolica Italiana
- Lithuania - Związek Harcerstwa Polskiego na Litwie
- Netherlands - Federatie Scouting Europa Nederland (FSE) - one Rover crew
- United Kingdom - European Scout Federation (British Association) (FSE) - 10 groups

Friend associations and corresponding members:

- Spain - Organización Juvenil Española (OJE)
- Poland - Związek Harcerstwa Rzeczypospolitej (ZHR)
- Brazil, Joinville - Associação Escoteira Independente Pirai (AESPI)

== Former members ==
The following organizations were listed as members in 2002 and left the CES or were dissolved between 2002 and 2009:

- France - Fédération Française de Scoutisme (FFDS, founded 1970); umbrella federation
  - France/Alsace - Fédération du Scoutisme Européen Alsace (FSE Alsace, all known active groups are located in Germany near Mannheim)
  - France/Picardy - Guides et Scouts St Bernard
  - France/Picardy - Scouts de la Forêt de Brocéliande
  - France/Champagne - Scouts Libres Européens
- Spain - Confederación Española de Federaciones y Asociaciones Scouts; umbrella federation
  - Spain/nationwide - Federación de Asociaciones Scouts Baden-Powell (SBP)
  - Spain/Andalusia - Asociación de Guías y Scouts ASA - Andalucía (ASA)

Another former member is the Italian Federazione del Movimento Scout Italiano (until June 2006 Federazione Scautistica Italiana; FEDERSCOUT), which left the CES in 2008 joining the World Federation of Independent Scouts.

Until 1996 the CES had a member in Portugal, the Associação das Guias e Escuteiros da Europa (Guide and Scout Association of Europe), which left the CES and joined the UIGSE.

== Board ==
2019–2022

- President: Wouter Aarts (FSE-NL)
- Vice-President: Verena Börger (BEP)
- Secretary: Brian Cockburn (FSE-BA)
- Treasurer: Maite Orens (E&S)

2022-2025

President: Wouter Aarts (FSE-NL) Vice-President: Łukasz Mikielewicz (ZHPnL) Secretary: Amanda Clayton (FSE-BA) Treasurer: Théo Lemahieu (E&S)

2025-2028

President: Amanda Clayton (FSE-BA) Vice-President: Jeroen Deumers (FSE-NL) Secretary: Elena Ruiz Marcos (OJE) Treasurer: Théo Lemahieu (E&S)

== Emblems ==
The emblem of Europe et Scoutisme

- The emblem of Europe et Scoutisme is based on the emblem of the CES, a Fleur-de-lis with the European stars on a blue background.
- The Bund Europäischer Pfadfinder, the Federatie Scouting Europa Nederland and the European Scout Federation (British Association) use the old emblem of the FSE, a gold fleur-de-Lys on a red Cross Paté, with a blue background.
- The emblem of the Organización Juvenil Española is a gold lion on a red cross potent.

== Eurojam ==
The Eurojam is the Scouting jamboree of the CES.

Year	Location, Country	Theme/Name	Attendance	Annotations
1981	Bramhope, United Kingdom	-	700	
1985	Hosenbachtal (near Niederhosenbach), Germany	Pierre de Lumière (Stone of Light)	> 600	
1989	Heeze, The Netherlands	Environment and Pollution	~ 1,000	
1993	Olloy-sur-Viroin, Belgium	Tales and Legends	1,372	
1997	Bassano Romano, Italy	Let us help Europe to develop	1,645	
2002	Thoresby Hall, United Kingdom	Robin Hood and his merry men	417	planned for 2001 but postponed to 2002 due to the 2001 United Kingdom foot-and-mouth crisis
2006	Hauenstein, Germany	Vier Elemente (Four Elements)	401	originally planned for 2005 in Spain
2010	Villers-sur-Lesse, Belgium	Belgian comics	382	
2013	Gilwell Ada's Hoeve, Ommen, Netherlands	That monster, that cursed monster! (Saint George and the dragon)	550	
2017	Campamento Juvenil "Raso de la Nava", Covaleda, Spain	Castles		
2022	Hope Valley, Derbyshire, United Kingdom			originally planned for 2021 but postponed to 2022 due to the COVID-19 pandemic
2025	Lake Asveja, Lithuania	Space Tribes 3025		
