= National Scout Movement of Armenia =

National Scouting organization of Armenia

- National Scout Movement of Armenia emblem
- Headquarters: Yerevan
- Country: Armenia
- Founded: 1912
- Membership: 1,473
- Affiliation: World Organization of the Scout Movement; European Scout Region

The National Scout Movement of Armenia (Armenian: Հայաստանի Ազգային Սկաուտական Շարժում, ՀՄԸՄ-ՀԱՍԿ); (Hayastani Azgayin Scautakan Sharjum Kazmakerputiun, HASK), is the primary national scouting organization of Armenia. It became a member of the World Organization of the Scout Movement in 1997 and a member of the European Scout Region in 2023. The coeducational National Scout Movement of Armenia has 1,473 members as of 2021.

== History ==
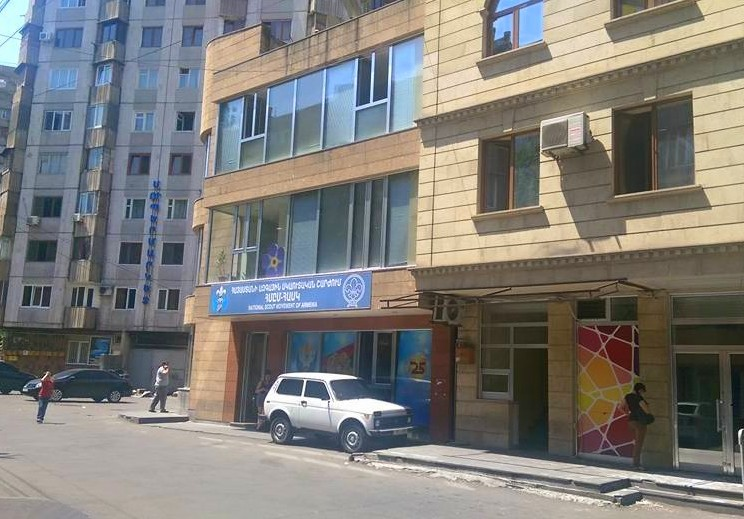
The movement's headquarters in Yerevan

Scouting in Armenia was founded in 1912, then later developed abroad among the refugees who had survived the genocide of 1915-1916 and among those that had fled the new communist occupation of their lands, at which point Scouting ceased to exist in Armenia.

Haï Ari (in French Association des Scouts Armeniens, in English Association of Armenian Scouts) was a member of the World Organization of the Scout Movement from 1928 to 1997. The organization was recognized in exile, with headquarters and approximately 1,100 members in France.

In 1978, Dr. Kourkène Medzadourian was awarded the Bronze Wolf, the only distinction of the World Organization of the Scout Movement, awarded by the World Scout Committee for exceptional services to world Scouting.

1994 saw the formation of the Armenian National Scout Movement. As of 2004, HASK had over 2,368 members, both male and female. In order to permit entry into the World Organization for Scouting in Armenia, the French-based Armenian Scouts withdrew membership in the World Organization, which passed to HASK on April 18, 1997. On that date, the number of national member organizations of the World Organization rose to 144. The new Armenian National Scout Movement was represented at the 18th World Scout Jamboree in the Netherlands.

The Scout Motto is Misht Badrast, Always Ready in Armenian. The Armenian noun for a single Scout is Սկաուտ, transliterated Scaut.

The Scout emblem incorporates the national colors as well as Mount Ararat, also an element of the coat of arms of Armenia.

On 30 September 2023, it was decided to dissolve the Eurasian Scout Region. As such, the National Scout Movement of Armenia subsequently joined the European Scout Region on 1 October 2023.

== See also ==
- Albert A. Boyajian
- Education in Armenia
- National Association of Girl Guides and Girl Scouts of Armenia
