= Hylands House =

Villa in South East England

Coordinates: 51°42′41″N 0°26′10″E

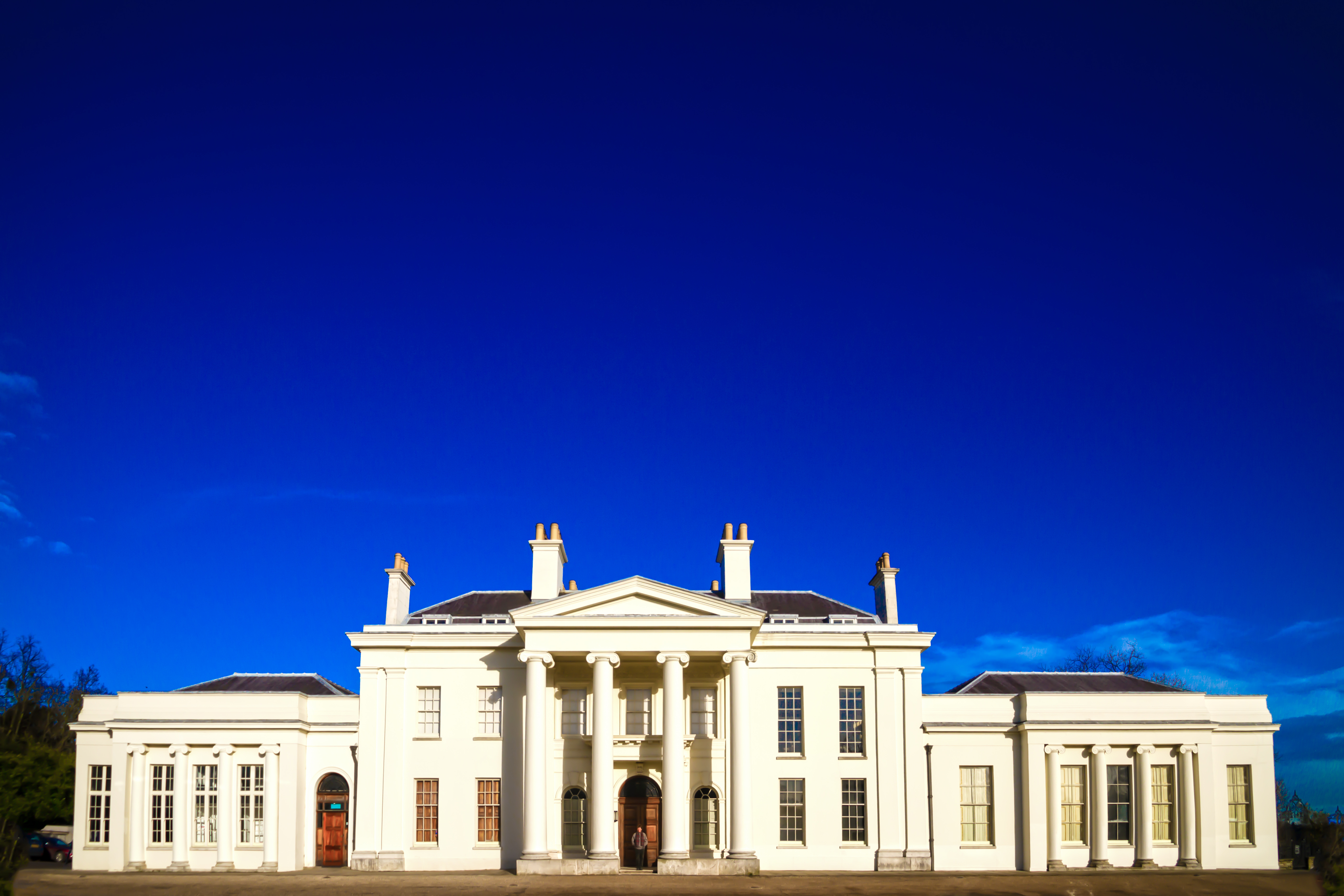
Hylands House

Hylands House is a Grade II* neo-classical villa situated within Hylands Park a 232-hectare (574 acre) park southwest of Chelmsford in Essex in South East England. It is owned and operated by Chelmsford City Council.

== History ==
The last private owner lived in Hylands House until her death in 1962. In 1966, with the house in a desperate state of disrepair, that Chelmsford Borough Council purchased the Park for the people of Chelmsford to enjoy. Hylands Park was opened to the public only 10 days later. It was agreed by Chelmsford Borough Council that Hylands House should be restored to its former glory and, having stood empty for 20 years, the first phase of restoration took place in 1986. The final stage was completed in September 2005.

== Past owners of Hylands House ==
Around 1726, Sir John Comyns, a local lawyer, purchased the manor of Shaxstones in Writtle, and commissioned the construction of a new family home on the estate, . Completed in 1730, Hylands House was an elegant two-storey red brick building in the Queen Anne style. The grounds were set out in the formal geometric style fashionable at the time, with a pleasure garden and small kitchen garden to the north of the house.

Sir John Comyns died in 1740, without surviving children, and left the estate to his nephew, John Comyns of Romford.

In 1797 Cornelius Kortright bought Hylands House and employed the well-known landscape architect Humphry Repton, who advised the addition of east and west wings, a colonnaded portico, and covering the whole house in white stucco. Kortright purchased an additional 150 acres of land to accommodate the scheme and by 1814 the changes made to the estate were extensive.

Pierre Cesar Labouchere, a Dutch-born merchant banker, bought the estate in 1814 and set about completing Repton's scheme for expansion and improvement of the house and parkland. This resulted in the symmetrical neo-classic facade that exists today. Labouchere created the formal Pleasure Gardens and under the guidance of architect Williams Atkinson, the Georgian stable block and coachman's cottage. He also collected neo-classical sculptures, including works by the Danish sculptor Bertel Thorvatldsen, replicas of which are on display in the house today.

After Labouchère's death, his son Henry Labouchere sold Hylands House and Estate to Mr John Attwood, former owner of an ironworks in Birmingham. Attwood was an ambitious entrepreneur who wanted a property to befit his new status and promote his quest for a peerage. he decided that Hylands was insufficiently grand to reflect his position in society, and had the house considerably enlarged and fully redecorated. He bought over 3,500 acres (14 km^{2}) of additional land surrounding Hylands and privatised the road from Writtle to Margaretting that ran through the estate.

Attwood eventually ran into financial difficulties and was forced to sell the house and estate. .

Arthur Pryor was a partner in the Truman, Hanbury and Buxton Brewery and purchased a much reduced Hylands Estate in 1858. He did little to the house other than some redecoration, although some of the exuberant decoration in the Banqueting Room is credited to him. Pryor's eldest son inherited the estate but chose to rent out rather than live there himself.

Having originally rented the House and land in 1904, Sir Daniel Gooch purchased Hylands in 1907, and modernised the house, installing electricity and telephones. During World War I, Hylands House was requisitioned for use as a military hospital, and over 1,500 patients were treated there. .

In 1920, Hylands was sold to a syndicate of local gentlemen, but only two years later it was bought by John Hanbury. Like Arthur Pryor, John was chairman of the brewers Truman's. However, John Hanbury died suddenly in 1923 before taking occupation of Hylands. Hi wife Christine made great changes to the grounds, including a lawn tennis court, rhododendron borders and she replaced the wooden fence in front of the house with a stone ha-ha. She also made a private area in the gardens dedicated to the memory of her husband and son. During World War II, the estate was the site of a German Prisoner of War Camp, and the house was used by the SAS as their headquarters.

Mrs Christine Hanbury died in 1962, aged 89, leaving the house and estate to her trustees, and for the final time in its history, Hylands was again offered for sale. Chelmsford Borough Council purchased the house and estate at auction in 1966 and opened only the park to the public because the house was in a dilapidated condition at the time of the purchase due to a fire, and by 1971 the servants quarters had been demolished. A motion to knock down the entire house was narrowly defeated by 15 votes to 9.

== Restoration ==
In 1967 Hylands House became a Grade II listed building. In 1985 the Borough Council set up a restoration fund and later that year English Heritage gave their consent to the Council's proposal to reduce the house to its early 19th-century form. Prior to work commencing Hylands House was re-graded to become a Grade II* listed building.

Under the direction of Borough Architect, Esmond Abraham, phased restoration work began in 1986, and by 1996 the external work to the House had been completed and the Entrance Hall restored to its Regency grandeur. The Friends of Hylands House was formed and they undertook fundraising to assist with the furnishing of the House.

The final phase of restoration in the House was completed in September 2005, led by the Director of Parks and Heritage Services Susan Ireland who achieved a grant of £18,700 from the Heritage Lottery Fund, as part of a larger funding award for the Estate. This enabled the completion of the house, as well as the restoration of the Stable Block and Humphry Repton landscape.

== Restoration of the Estate ==
21st World Scout Jamboree at Hylands Park, 2007

Intensive work on restoring the historic landscape of Hylands Park to its 18th-century splendour, designed by landscape architect Humphry Repton, began in 2004 and was completed in 2007. The restoration of Hylands Park was led by Susan Ireland who obtained grant funding from the Heritage Lottery Fund for £3.4 million and by the Council.

== Recent history ==
Fling Festival at Hylands Park, 2015

From 1996 until 2017, the park hosted the annual V Festival. In 2018 it became RiZE Festival which ran for 1 year. In 2022, Creamfields then took over the annual festival which was subsequently named Creamfields South Festival.

In the 2004 film Chasing Liberty, Hylands House doubled as the US White House. In 2005 Hylands Park was the venue for the European Scout Jamboree and in 2007 Hylands welcomed scouts from over 160 nations for the 21st World Scout Jamboree, which celebrated 100 years of scouting. The One World Garden was created to commemorate this historic event, and now forms part of the estate.

In 2019, the Netflix series The Crown Season 3, Hylands House was again used as a double for the White House.

The Stables section of the house is now an Arts Quarter.
