= List of protected heritage sites in Viroinval =

This table shows an overview of the protected heritage sites in the Walloon town Viroinval. This list is part of Belgium's national heritage.

Object	Year/architect	Town/section	Address	Coordinates	Number^{?}	Image
The site of "Roche à Lomme", the "Montagne-au-tube" and the "au Tienne Pauquis" ^{(nl)} ^{(fr)}		Dourbes Viroinval		50.089822°N 4.540941°E	93090-CLT-0004-01 Info	
Church of Saint-Servais, the ensemble of the church, the cemetery surrounded by a wall ^{(nl)} ^{(fr)}		Viroinval	Dourbes	50.088547°N 4.593262°E	93090-CLT-0006-01 Info	Kerk Saint-Servais, het ensemble van de kerk, het kerkhof omgeven door een muur
Old castle ruins of the "Pont d'Avignon" ^{(nl)} ^{(fr)}		Viroinval	Nismes	50.074169°N 4.546584°E	93090-CLT-0009-01 Info	Oud kasteel en ruïnes van "Pont d'Avignon"
Chapel of Saint Joseph and the building and its surroundings ^{(nl)} ^{(fr)}		Viroinval	Viroinval	50.063653°N 4.551768°E	93090-CLT-0011-01 Info	
House of Bailli ^{(nl)} ^{(fr)}		Viroinval	Nismes	50.074139°N 4.546960°E	93090-CLT-0012-01 Info	Huis van Bailli
Chapel of Saint-Roch ^{(nl)} ^{(fr)}		Viroinval	Viroinval	50.079083°N 4.549970°E	93090-CLT-0013-01 Info	
Valley Viroin ^{(nl)} ^{(fr)}		Mazée Viroinval		50.073617°N 4.635292°E	93090-CLT-0016-01 Info	Vallei van Viroin
Chapel of Saint-Roch and the ensemble of the chapel and its surroundings ^{(nl)} ^{(fr)}		Viroinval	Mazée	50.102573°N 4.703511°E	93090-CLT-0017-01 Info	Kapel Saint-Roch en het ensemble van de kapel en diens omgeving
Totality of the old washing place and the ensemble of these, with the chapel and the site of the triangular forest ^{(nl)} ^{(fr)}		Vierves-sur-Viroin Viroinval	Vierves	50.080371°N 4.631772°E	93090-CLT-0018-01 Info	
The castle and the outer wall of limestone and the ensemble of the farm and its surroundings ^{(nl)} ^{(fr)}		Treignes Viroinval	Treignes	50.093125°N 4.669833°E	93090-CLT-0019-01 Info	De kasteelhoeve en de buitenmuur in kalksteen en het ensemble van de boerderij en zijn omgeving
Totality of the main building and the keep of the castle of Treignes ^{(nl)} ^{(fr)}		Treignes Viroinval		50.092926°N 4.669648°E	93090-CLT-0020-01 Info	
Fond du Ry ^{(nl)} ^{(fr)}		Treignes Viroinval	Treignes	50.094175°N 4.670187°E	93090-CLT-0021-01 Info	
Old bridge over the Viroin, and the ensemble of the bridge and the surrounding areas, namely the river and its banks over a hundred meters upstream and downstream ^{(nl)} ^{(fr)}		Treignes Viroinval	Treignes	50.091233°N 4.670322°E	93090-CLT-0022-01 Info	Oude brug over de Viroin, en het ensemble van de brug en de omringende terreinen, namelijk de rivier en haar oevers meer dan honderd meter stroomopwaarts en stroomafwaarts
Ensemble of the site of Walleu ^{(nl)} ^{(fr)}		Dourbes Viroinval	Dourbes	50.076606°N 4.581095°E	93090-CLT-0023-01 Info	
Ensemble of the Fondry des Chiens and the limestone lawn of Tienne Sainte-Anne, which borders it ^{(nl)} ^{(fr)}		Viroinval		50.067263°N 4.553602°E	93090-CLT-0024-01 Info	Ensemble van de Fondry des Chiens en het kalkstenen grasperk van Tienne Sainte-Anne, waaraan het grenst
The site of "Roche à Lomme", the "Montagne-au-tube" and the "au Tienne Pauquis" ^{(nl)} ^{(fr)}		Viroinval		50.089822°N 4.540941°E	93090-PEX-0001-01 Info	
Ensemble of the Fondry des Chien and the limestone lawn of Tienne Sainte-Anne, which it borders ^{(nl)} ^{(fr)}		Viroinval		50.067263°N 4.553602°E	93090-PEX-0002-01 Info	Ensemble van de Fondry des Chiens en het kalkstenen grasperk van Tienne Sainte-Anne, waaraan het grenst

== See also ==
- List of protected heritage sites in Namur (province)
- Viroinval
