= Savvas Kokkinides =

- Σάββας Κοκκινίδης

International Commissioner of the Cyprus Scouts Association

Savvas Kokkinides (Greek: Σάββας Κοκκινίδης) served as the International Commissioner of the Cyprus Scouts Association.

In 1980, Kokkinides was awarded the 141st Bronze Wolf, the only distinction of the World Organization of the Scout Movement, awarded by the World Scout Committee for exceptional services to world Scouting.
