= Teruko =

- Gender: Female

Origin
- Origin: Japanese
- Meaning: Different meanings depending on the kanji used

Teruko (written: 照子, 曦子, 輝子 or 光子) is a feminine Japanese given name. Notable people with the name include:

- Princess Teruko (曦子 内親王; 1224–1262), Empress of Japan
- Teruko, Princess Ake (光子内親王; 1634-1727), Japanese princess and artist
- Teruko Akai (赤井 輝子; 1514–1594), female samurai warrior.
- Teruko Ishizaka (石坂 照子; 1926–2019), Japanese scientist
- Teruko Kiriake (桐明 輝子; born 1996), Japanese sprint canoer
- Teruko Miyamoto (宮本 輝子; born 1952), Japanese basketball player
- Teruko Mizushima (水島 照子; 1920-1996), Japanese housewife, author, inventor, social commentator, and activist
- Teruko Oe (大江 光子; born 1969), Japanese long-distance runner
- Teruko Sono (園 輝子; 1846–1925), Japanese educational reformer, lawyer, author, businesswoman and scholar
- Teruko Wada (和田 照子; born 1969), Japanese lawyer and President of the Girl Scouts of Japan
- Teruko Yamada (山田 照子; born 1956), Japanese luger
- Teruko Yokoi (横井 照子; 1924–2020), Japanese artist
