= National Union of Girl Guides and Girl Scouts of Armenia =

ՀՀ Աղջիկ սկաուտների — գայդերի "ԱՍՏՂԻԿ" ազգային միավորում
- National Union of Girl Guides and Girl Scouts of Armenia 'ASTGIK'
- Headquarters: Yerevan
- Country: Armenia
- Founded: 1996
- Founders: Gohar and Amalya Mkhitaryan
- Membership: 1200
- Chief Scout: Narine Hovhannisyan
- Affiliation: World Association of Girl Guides and Girl Scouts
- Website nagggs.blogspot.co.uk

The National Union of Girl Guides and Girl Scouts of Armenia ("Astghik", meaning "guide in life"; ՀՀ Աղջիկ սկաուտների — գայդերի ԱՍԳԱՄ «Աստղիկ» ազգային միավորում) is the national Guiding Union of Armenia. Guiding came to Armenia in 1988; the union was founded in 1996, and became an associate member of the World Association of Girl Guides and Girl Scouts (WAGGGS) in 2002 and a full member in 2014. The girls-only organization has 1200 members (as of 2014).

== History ==
The first variant of the membership badge of Astghik was square, the second was eight-point star-shaped (۞), and the present day official membership badge is a circle.

The first Guide patrols in Armenia were founded in 1988 as part of a coeducational Scouting organization. In 1996, the girls left this organization and founded Astghik, a girls-only association. The first contact with WAGGGS was established in 1997, and in 1999, the association received the status WAGGGS Certificate of Country Working Towards Membership. Meanwhile, Astghik was authorized by the Armenian Ministry of Justice in December 1998. In 2002, the association became an associate member of WAGGGS.

NUGGGS "Astghik" functions/operates in different regions of Armenia, and the Union holds weekly meetings of the groups. The Union is a non-governmental organization that organizes various seminars, trainings, camps, and cultural activities both in Armenia and abroad. It works with non-formal educational programs. The Union offers its members learning by doing, challenges, interesting and happy everyday life.

The educational program of NUGGGS “Astghik” consists of nine main points, including, scouting family, the society in which we live, discover yourself, world around us, cultural world, nature, healthy life, widen/deepen your way of thinking, housewife. These programs help women and girls to become independent self-confident individuals being able to make their own decisions. The Movement unites girls and women from different countries, helping to develop partnership and teamwork, decision making, listening and understanding abilities. It gives the opportunity to do things that are interesting and exciting.

The union has three age groups:

- 6–10 years are called "Artsvik"
- 11–15 years are called "Arenush"
- 16–20 years are called "Parmanuhi"

== Program ==
"Our mission in the dynamic world to promote the formation of spiritual, physical, intellectual abilities, social potential and the formation of character in girls and women as individuals: responsible citizens of the world."

== Uniform ==
All members wear a green short sleeved blouse with a group neckerchief.

== See also ==
- National Scout Movement of Armenia
