= Cyprus Scouts Association =

National scouting organization of Cyprus

Σώμα Προσκόπων Κύπρου
- Cyprus Scouts Association
- Country: Cyprus
- Founded: 1913
- Membership: 5,926
- Affiliation: World Organization of the Scout Movement
- Website cyprusscouts.org

The Cyprus Scouts Association (Greek: Σώμα Προσκόπων Κύπρου, romanized: Soma Proskopon Kyprou, SPK) is the national Scouting organization of Cyprus. It was founded in 1913 and became a member of the World Organization of the Scout Movement in 1961. SPK has 5,926 members.

== History ==
Scouting was officially founded in Cyprus in 1913 by N. K. Lanitis and Nikos Nikolaides, with the assistance of the United Kingdom.

In 1980, Savvas Kokkinides was awarded the Bronze Wolf, the only distinction of the World Organization of the Scout Movement, awarded by the World Scout Committee for exceptional services to world Scouting.

== Program and ideals ==
The Cyprus Scouts Association is open to all boys and girls including those stationed at the Eastern and Western Sovereign Base Areas. The Scouts are one of the oldest youth organizations on the island. Scouts have taken an active part in all aspects of social and cultural life.

The Cyprus Scout Association takes an active part in national, regional and international Scout events. Cyprus was represented at the 19th World Jamboree in Chile by 36 Scouts and was also represented in the 21st World Scout Jamboree that took place in the UK.

The Scouts of Cyprus have been working to assist with the refugee crisis caused by the 2006 Lebanon War. One of the Scout Centers is accommodating 106 children from Lebanon who had been separated from their families while fleeing the war-torn country. As the situation escalates, thousands of people are now arriving daily by sea at the ports of Larnaca and Limassol. The Scout Motto (Προσκοπικό ρητό) is Έσo έτοιμος, Be Prepared in Greek.

The membership badge of the Cyprus Scouts Association incorporates the copper-yellow and green national colors, as well as the olive branches of the coat of arms and the flag of Cyprus.

=== Scout Oath ===
Υπόσχομαι στην τιμή μου

να εκτελώ το καθήκον μου στο Θεό και την Πατρίδα
να βοηθώ κάθε άνθρωπο σε κάθε περίσταση και

να τηρώ το Νόμο του Προσκόπου.
On my honour I promise to do my best:

to do my duty to God and my country, help other

people at all times and to obey the Scout Law

=== Scout Law ===
1. Ο Πρόσκοπος λέει την αλήθεια και κρατά το λόγο του.

2. Ο Πρόσκοπος είναι δίκαιος, άξιος να τον εμπιστεύονται, ξέρει να πειθαρχεί και να τηρεί τους Νόμους.
3. Ο Πρόσκοπος είναι χρήσιμος στην οικογένειά του και την κοινωνία.
4. Ο Πρόσκοπος είναι φίλος κι ευγενής προς όλους κι αδελφός με κάθε Πρόσκοπο.
5. Ο Πρόσκοπος σέβεται τον εαυτό του και τους άλλους, προσέχει τα λόγια και τις πράξεις του.
6. Ο Πρόσκοπος αγαπά τη φύση και προστατεύει το περιβάλλον.
7. Ο Πρόσκοπος είναι εύθυμος και αισιόδοξος.
8. Ο Πρόσκοπος είναι οικονόμος και φροντίζει για την καλή χρήση του χρόνου.
9. Ο Πρόσκοπος είναι εργατικός και προοδεύει με τις ικανότητές του.

10. Ο Πρόσκοπος είναι αποφασιστικός, έχει θάρρος και αυτοπεποίθηση κι αναλαμβάνει την ευθύνη των πράξεών του.
1. A Scout's honour is to be trusted

2. A Scout is loyal to his country, his Scouters, his parents, his employers and those under him
3. A Scout’s duty is to be useful and to help others
4. A Scout is a friend to all and a brother to every other Scout
5. A Scout is courteous
6. A Scout protects wildlife and forests
7. A Scout obeys the orders of his parents, Patrol Leader, or Scoutmaster without question
8. A Scout has a sense of humour and is optimistic in all difficulties
9. A Scout is thrifty

10. A Scout is clean in thought, word and deed
