= Shoqata e Guidave dhe Skoutëve në Shqipëri =

- Association of Guides and Scouts in Albania
- Country: Albania
- Founded: 1998
- Membership: 350

Shoqata e Guidave dhe Skoutëve në Shqipëri (ShGSSh, Association of Guides and Scouts in Albania) is one of Albania's Scouting and Guiding organizations. The coeducational organization was founded in 1998 and recognised by the World Association of Girl Guides and Girl Scouts as a country working towards membership. The association served about 350 members in 2006.

The association's development was supported by the Belgian Guides Catholiques de Belgique and the Italian Associazione Guide e Scouts Cattolici Italiani. In 2011, the collaboration with the World Association of Girl Guides and Girl Scouts was terminated.

It is one of the WAGGGS affiliates which also accepts boys as youth members, without being also a World Organization of the Scout Movement member.

The membership badge of Shoqata e Guidave dhe Scoutëve në Shqipëri incorporates the double-headed eagle of the arms of Gjergj Kastriot Skanderbeg featured on the emblem of Albania.

== See also ==
- Beslidhja Skaut Albania
