= Vierves-sur-Viroin =

Vierves-sur-Viroin Viêpe (Walloon)
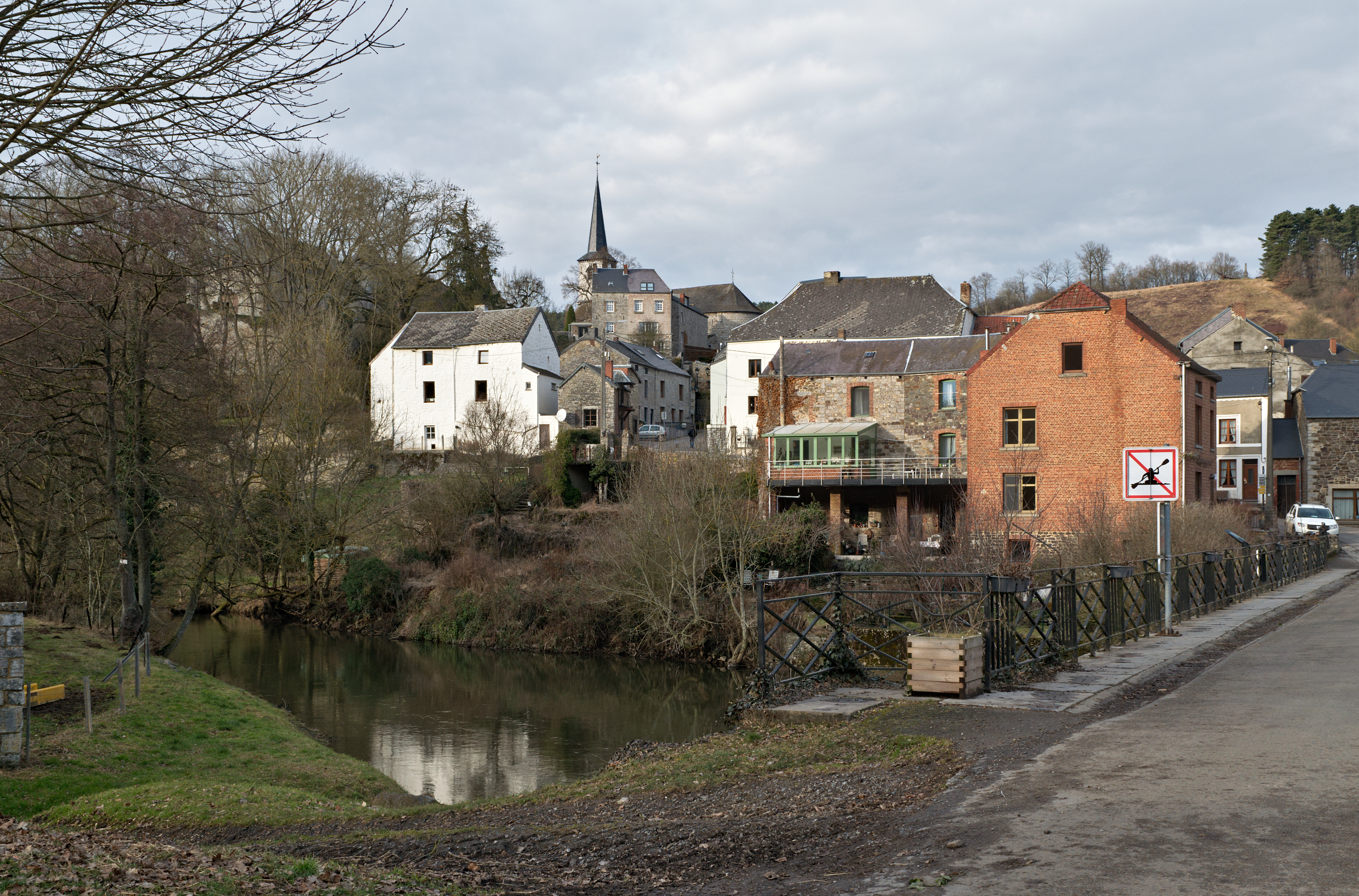
- Vierves-sur-Viroin

- Location in Belgium Vierves-sur-Viroin (Europe)
- Coordinates: 50°04′51″N 04°38′02″E
- Country: Belgium
- Region: Wallonia
- Province: Namur
- Municipality: Viroinval

Vierves-sur-Viroin (French pronunciation: [vjɛʁv syʁ viʁwɛ̃], lit. 'Vierves on Viroin'; Walloon: Viêpe) is a village of Wallonia and a district of the municipality of Viroinval, located in the province of Namur, Belgium.

The village surrounds the castle, which was erected during the Middle Ages. Its present appearance dates large from the end of the 18th century, as it was extensively ravaged by fire in 1775 and later restored. The castle served as the seat of a court of justice from the 15th century until 1852, and was the setting of a number of witch trials during the 16th and 17th centuries. Aside from the castle, the village has an ancient lavoir and ruins of a mill from the 13th–14th centuries. The village is a member of the association Les Plus Beaux Villages de Wallonie.

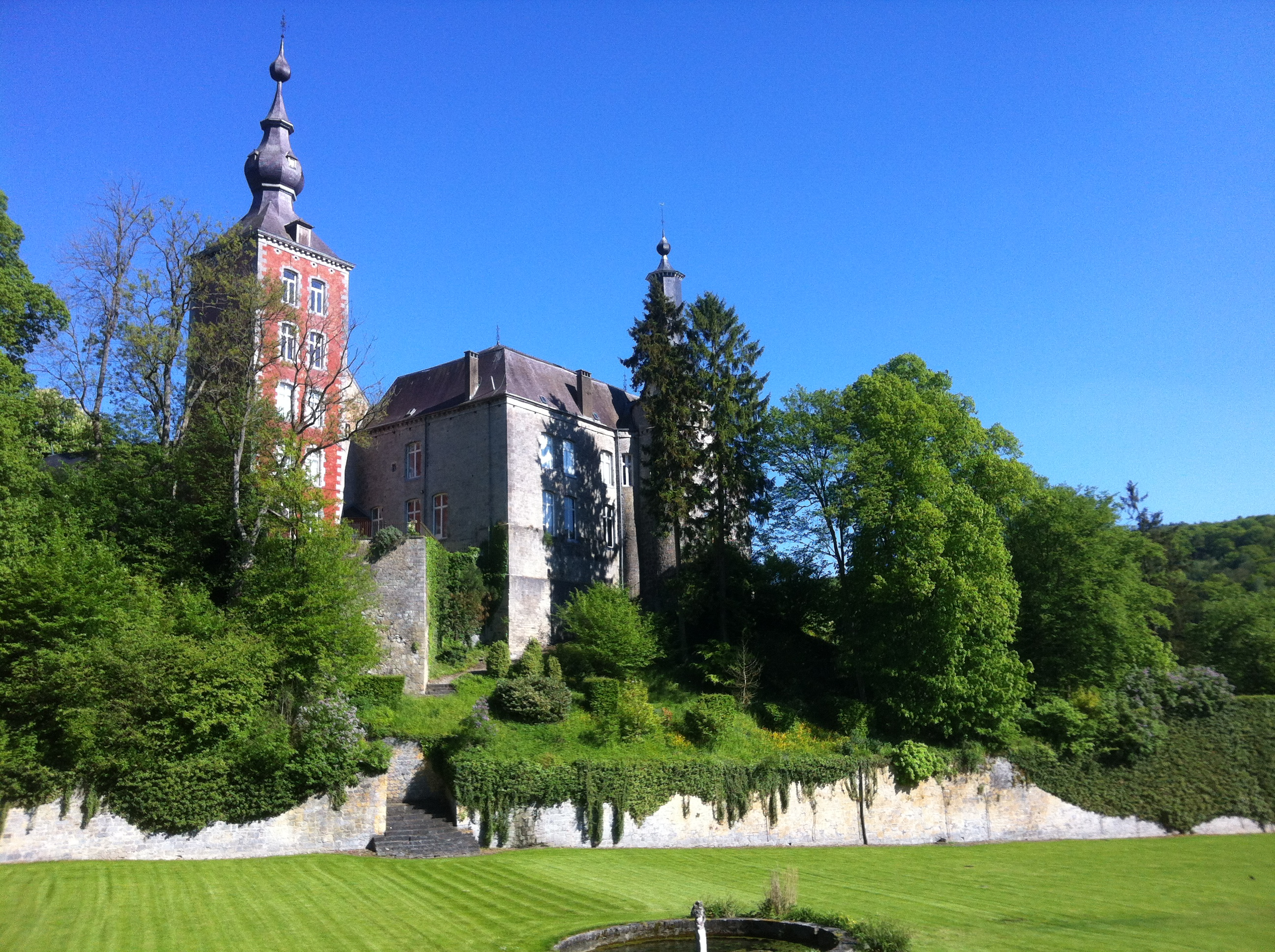
Castle

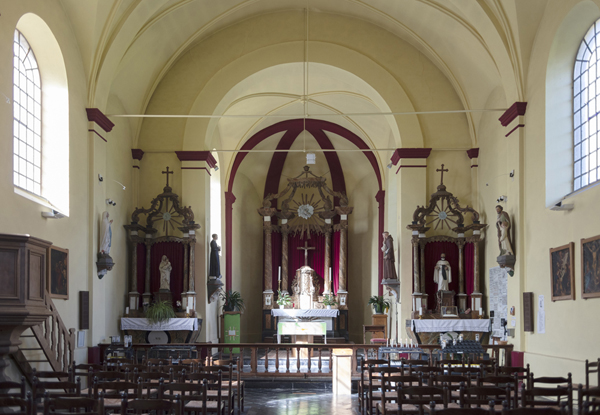
Église Saints-Rufin et Valère

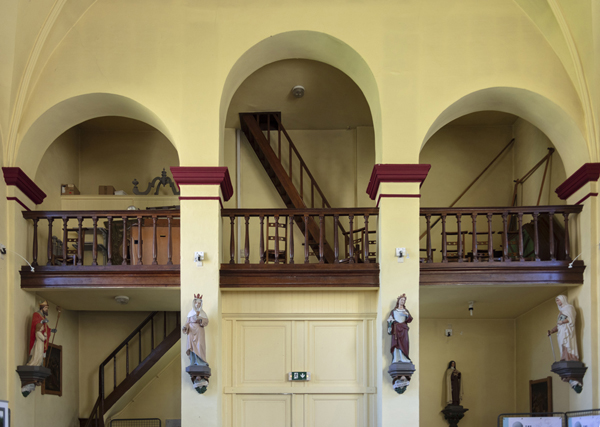
Église Saints-Rufin et Valère
