= Girl Scouts of Japan =

Scouting organization for girls in Japan

- Girl Scouts of Japan
- Headquarters: Nishihara 1-40-3, Shibuya-ku
- Location: Tokyo
- Country: Japan
- Founded: 1919
- Membership: 28,404
- Affiliation: World Association of Girl Guides and Girl Scouts
- Website www.girlscout.or.jp

The Girl Scouts of Japan (ガールスカウト日本連盟, Gārusukauto Nippon Renmei) is a scouting organization for girls in Japan, founded in 1919. It became a member of the World Association of Girl Guides and Girl Scouts in 1952 and had 33,593 members as of 2014.

== History ==
Girl Guiding was first introduced in Japan in 1919 by Miss Muriel Greenstreet, a British missionary teacher. The movement gradually spread, and in 1920 took the name Joshi-Hodo-dan (Girl Guides of Japan). In 1928, Japan became a founder member of WAGGGS. Girl Guiding was suspended during World War II, restarted as Girl Scouting in 1947, and was officially recognized as Girl Scouts of Japan (Gārusukauto Nippon Renmei) in 1949.

In 2000, Her Highness Princess Sayako attended a variety of events in the Tokyo metropolitan area and in regional Japan, including the ceremony for the 50th anniversary of the establishment of the Girl Scouts of Tokyo, and the opening ceremony for the Togakushi Girl Scouts Center to commemorate the 80th anniversary of the Girl Scouting movement in Japan.

The Girl Scout program in Japan focuses on three major points: self-development, human relations, and nature. Some of the Girl Scout activities include working with the disabled, planting trees, and protecting the environment from floods and air pollution.

== Program and ideals ==
Girl Scouts in Japan

The Girl Scouts are divided into 6 groups/ranks. Troops (団) tend to have multiple levels in one group that are further broken down into smaller units consisting of the same rank. Each group focuses on something new.

- Tenderfoot (from 1 year before 1st grade), around 5 years old; a creme yellow neckerchief.
- Brownie (grades 1 through 3), around 6 to 8 years; red neckerchief.

Brownies focus on learning more about themselves, their capabilities, and how much they matter. When a girl becomes a Brownie Scout, Leaders read the "Brownie Book" to the girls, sometimes even performing the story. It tells of two children who hear about magical creatures (Brownies) that help keep the house nice and clean. In order to help their parents the two children venture into the forest at night in search of the Brownies, only to discover at the end that they are Brownies and they can help their parents.

- Junior (grades 4 through 6), around 9 to 11 years; brown neckerchief

Juniors begin to focus on their friend group and other scouts. The idea is to encourage girls to not think just about themselves, but of what they can do for and with their friends.

- Senior (grades 7 through 9), around 12 to 14 years; green neckerchief
- Rangers (grades 10 through 12), around 15 to 17 years; navy neckerchief
- Adult Leaders (age 18 and over); light blue neckerchief

The Girl Scout emblem incorporates a sakura, a cherry blossom. May 22 is Girl Scout Day.

=== Promise ===
English

I promise to:
Do my duty to God (Buddha);
Be responsible for my community,
My country and the world;
Try to be helpful to other people;
and
Live by the Girl Scout Law.

Japanese

私は
神（仏）に対するつとめを行い
地域と国と世界への責任を果たし
人に役立つことを心がけ
ガールスカウトのおきてを守ります。

Romaji

watashi wa
kami (hotoke) ni taisuru tsutome wo okonai
chiiki to kuni to sekai e no sekinin wo hatashi
hito ni yakudatsu koto wo kokorogake
gārusukauto no oki te wo mamorimasu.

==== The Tenderfoot Promise ====
English

I am a Girl Scout.
I look and listen carefully, and
Be friendly to everyone.

Japanese

わたくしは ガールスカウトです。
わたくしは よくみて よくききます。
そして みんなと なかよくします。

Romaji

watakushi wa gārusukauto desu.
watakushi wa yoku mite yoku kikimasu.
soshite minna to nakayoku shimasu.

=== Law ===
English
1. I am cheerful and courageous at all times.
2. I respect all living things.
3. I am a friend to all, and a sister to every Girl Scout.
4. I am courteous.
5. I use time and resources wisely.
6. I think and act on my own.
7. I am responsible for what I say and do.
8. I try to be sincere.
Japanese

私はいつも明るく、勇気をもちます。
私はいのちあるものを大切にします。
私はすべての人の友達となり、他のガールスカウトとは姉妹です。
私は礼儀を正しくします。
私は時間と資源を大切に使います。
私は自分で考え行動します。
私は言葉と行いに責任をもちます。
私は誠実であるように努めます。

Romaji

watashi wa itsumo akaruku, yuuki o mochimasu.
watashi wa inochi aru mono wo taisetsu ni shimasu.
watashi wa subete no hito no tomodachi to nari, hoka no gārusukauto to wa shimaidesu.
watashi wa reigi wo tadashiku shimasu.
watashi wa jikan to shigen wo taisetsu ni tsukaimasu.
watashi wa jibun de kangae koudou shimasu.
watashi wa kotoba to okonai ni sekinin wo mochimasu.
watashi wa seijitsu dearu you ni tsutomemasu.

=== Motto ===
English	Japanese	Romaji
Be prepared	そなえよ つねに	sonaeyo tsuneni

==== The Tenderfoot Motto ====
English	Japanese	Romaji
Smile	いつも にこにこ	itsumo nikoniko

== See also ==
- Scout Association of Japan
