= Kourkène Medzadourian =

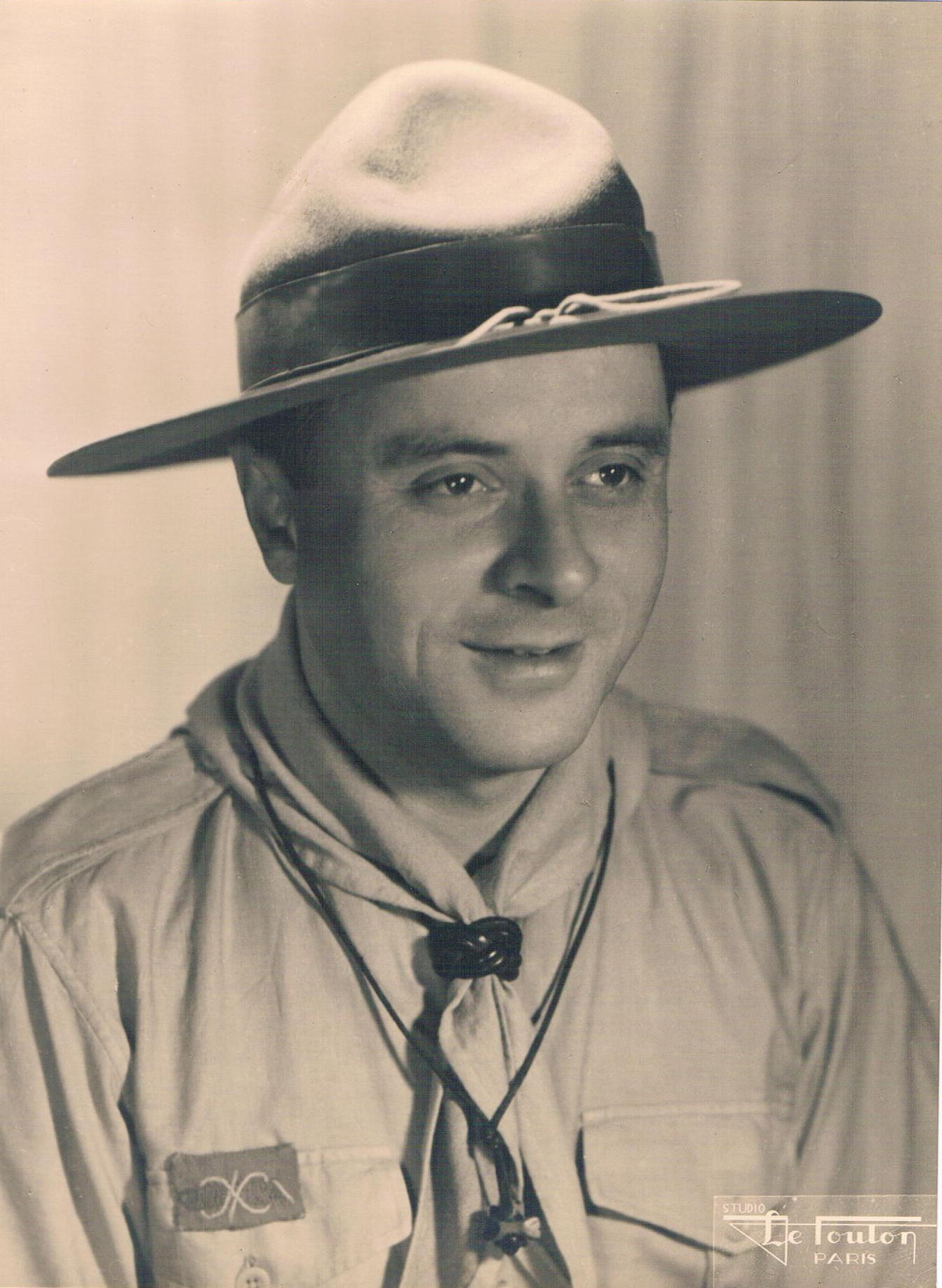
- Born: July 10, 1908; Pinguian, Ottoman Empire
- Died: December 27, 1996 (aged 88); Paris, France

Kourkène (Georges) Medzadourian (Armenian: Գուրգէն Մեծատուրեան) (July 10, 1908 - December 27, 1996) was the founder of the Haï Ari association of Armenian Scouts-in-Exile, based in France.

Scouting in Armenia was founded in 1912, then later developed abroad among the refugees who had survived the genocide of 1915-1916 and among those that had fled the new communist occupation of their lands, at which point Scouting ceased to exist in Armenia.

Haï Ari (in French Association des Scouts Armeniens, in English Association of Armenian Scouts) was a member of the World Organization of the Scout Movement from 1928 to 1997. The organization was recognized in exile, with headquarters in Paris and approximately 1,100 members in France.

In 1929, World Scouting recognised the association of Armenian Scouts Haï Ari, based in France. While the Association did not have its own territorial base, it was the exception to the rule, remaining a member of the World Organization and the European Scout Region.

In 1978, Medzadourian was awarded the Bronze Wolf, the only distinction of the World Organization of the Scout Movement, awarded by the World Scout Committee for exceptional services to world Scouting.
