= Europe Region (World Association of Girl Guides and Girl Scouts) =

WAGGGS divisional office in Europe

- Map of members or potential members of the WAGGGS-Europe Region; Andorra, with no Guiding organization, and those outside the Region, are in grey
- Owner: World Association of Girl Guides and Girl Scouts
- Headquarters: Brussels, Belgium
- Location: Rue Belliard,40 1000 Brussels
- Country: Belgium
- Chair: Eline Marie Grøholt; 2019 - 2022
- Vice Chair: Lilit Chilingaryan
- Website https://www.wagggs.org/en/our-world/europe-region/

The WAGGGS Europe Region is the regional office of the World Association of Girl Guides and Girl Scouts, which supports Girl Guiding and Girl Scouting in Europe, including the former Soviet Republics of Armenia, Azerbaijan, Belarus, Georgia, Moldova, Russia, and Ukraine, as well as Cyprus and Israel.

== History ==
Central and Eastern Europe and the Soviet Union have developed Guiding programs in the region. These include Albania, Bulgaria, East Germany, Hungary, Poland, Romania, and the successor states to Czechoslovakia, Yugoslavia and the Baltic nations independent of the former Soviet Union. Of these, Poland, the Czech Republic and Hungary. They have been particularly successful in rebuilding well-established Guide movements, supported in part by Guide-in-Exile organizations serving each nation’s diaspora.

This region is the counterpart of the European Region of the World Organization of the Scout Movement (WOSM). The Europe Region WAGGGS has strong connections to the European Region of WOSM. Both maintained a joined office in Brussels for some years and published a monthly newsletter called Eurofax. Currently the two regions run the joint communication platform 'WEConnect'.

Post-Soviet nations are divided between the WAGGGS-Europe Region and the WAGGGS-Asia Pacific Region.
