= Covaleda =

Coordinates: 41°56′N 2°53′W

- Municipality

- Flag Coat of arms

- Location in Spain. Covaleda (Spain)
- Country: Spain
- Autonomous community: Castile and León
- Province: Soria
- Municipality: Covaleda

Area
  - Total: 104.36 km^{2} (40.29 sq mi)
- Elevation: 1,202 m (3,944 ft)

Population (2025-01-01)
  - Total: 1,560
  - Density: 14.9/km^{2} (38.7/sq mi)
- Time zone: UTC+1 (CET)
  - Summer (DST): UTC+2 (CEST)
- Website: Official website

Covaleda is a municipality located in the province of Soria, Castile and León, Spain. According to the 2004 census (INE), the municipality had a population of 1,924 inhabitants.

== See also ==
- Picos de Urbión
