= Viroinval =

Municipality in Wallonia, Belgium

Viroinval Virwinvå (Walloon)
- Municipality
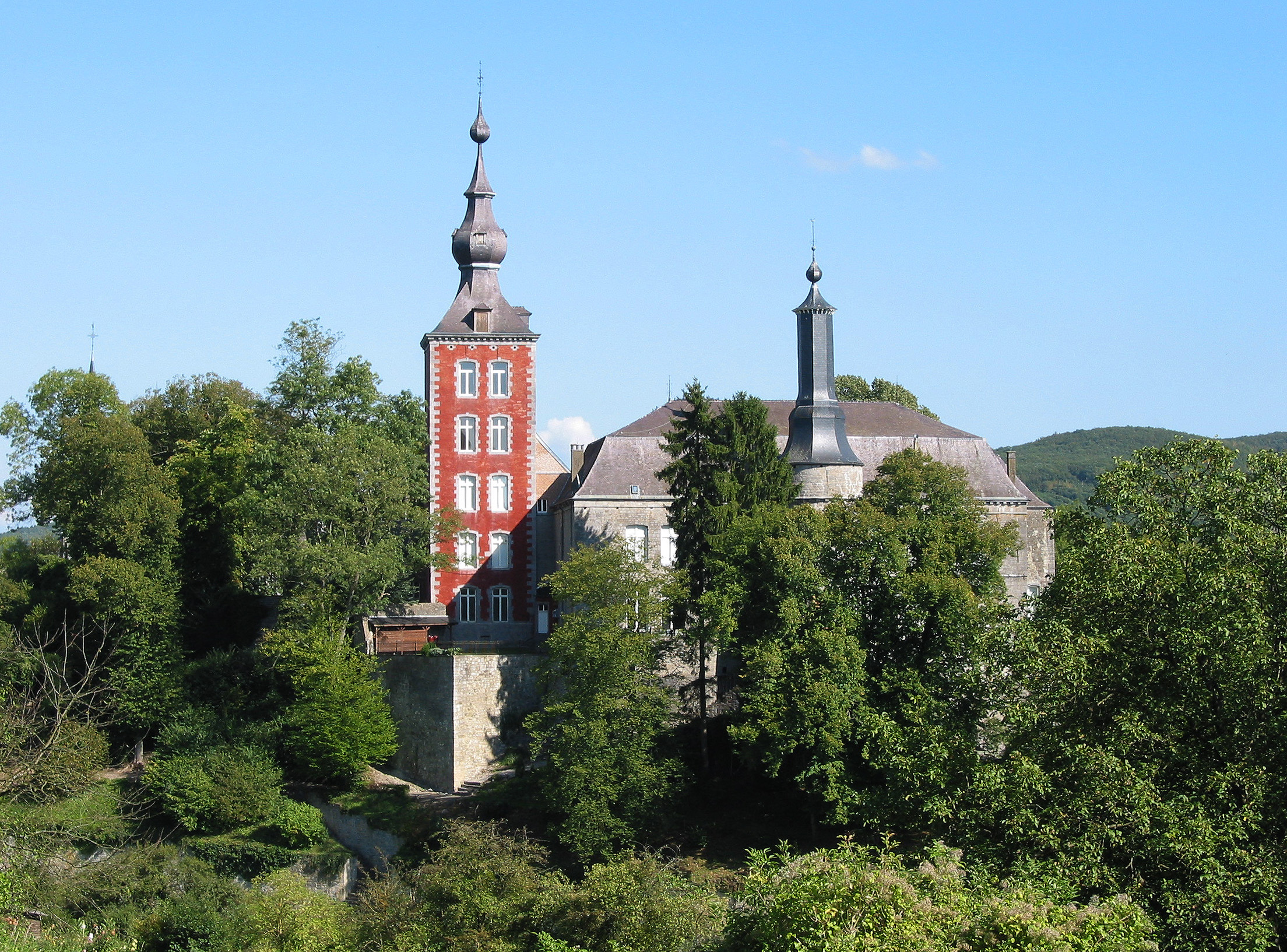

- Flag Coat of arms

- Location of Viroinval in the province of Namur
- Interactive map of Viroinval
- Location in Belgium
- Coordinates: 50°05′N 04°33′E
- Country: Belgium
- Community: French Community
- Region: Wallonia
- Province: Namur
- Arrondissement: Philippeville

Area
  - Total: 121.22 km^{2} (46.80 sq mi)

Population (2018-01-01)
  - Total: 5,731
  - Density: 47.28/km^{2} (122.4/sq mi)
- Postal codes: 5670
- NIS code: 93090
- Area codes: 060
- Website: www.viroinval.be

Viroinval (French pronunciation: [viʁwɛ̃val]; Walloon: Virwinvå) is a municipality of Wallonia located in the province of Namur, Belgium.

On January 1, 2006, Viroinval had a total population of 5,680. The total area is 120.90 km^{2} which gives a population density of 47 inhabitants per km^{2}.

The municipality consists of the following districts: Dourbes, Mazée, Le Mesnil, Nismes, Oignies-en-Thiérache, Olloy-sur-Viroin, Treignes, Vierves-sur-Viroin.

The name Viroinval, Viroin (River) Valley, was chosen for the municipality that was formed by fusing eight villages, in 1977.

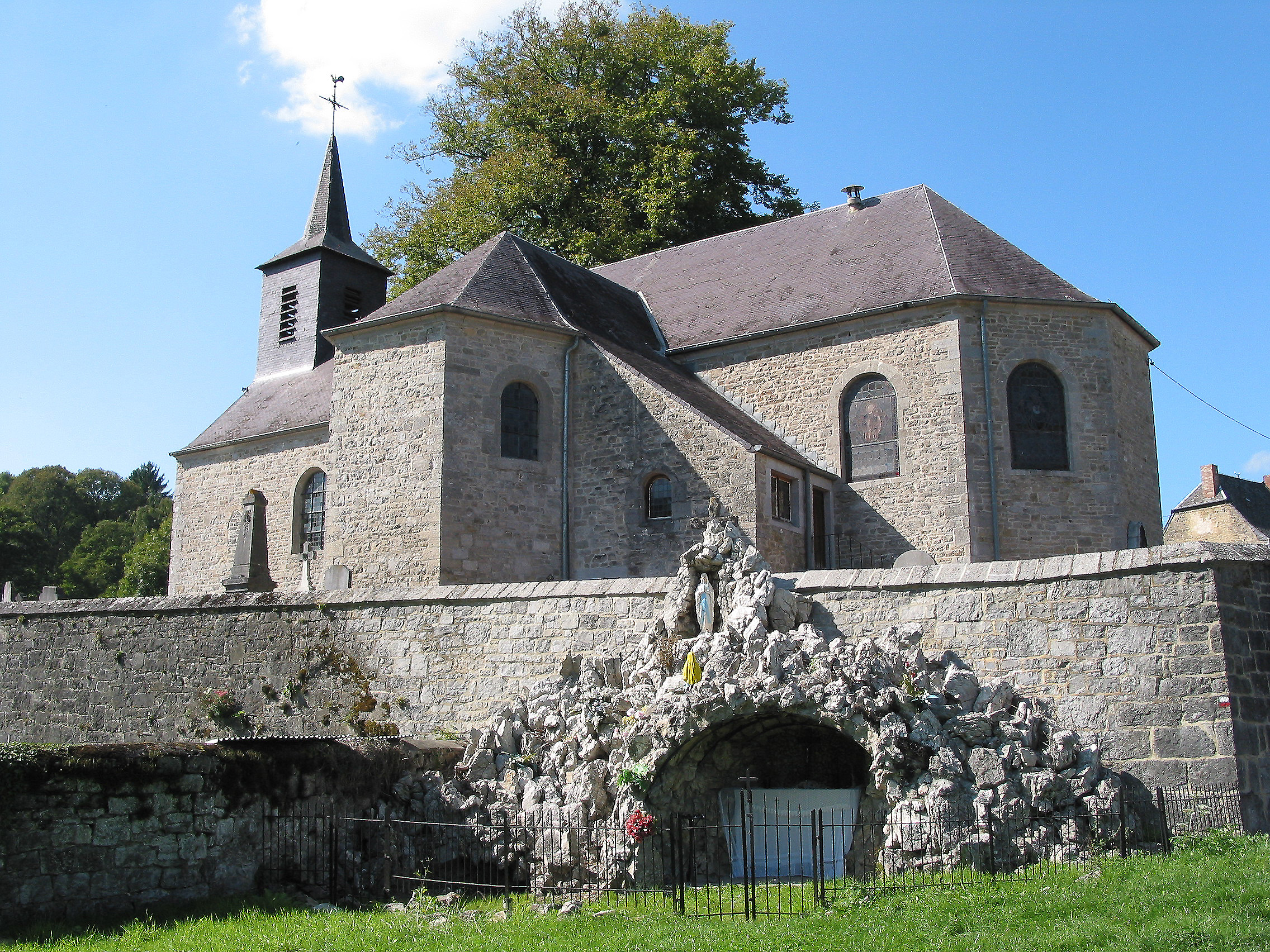
Dourbes

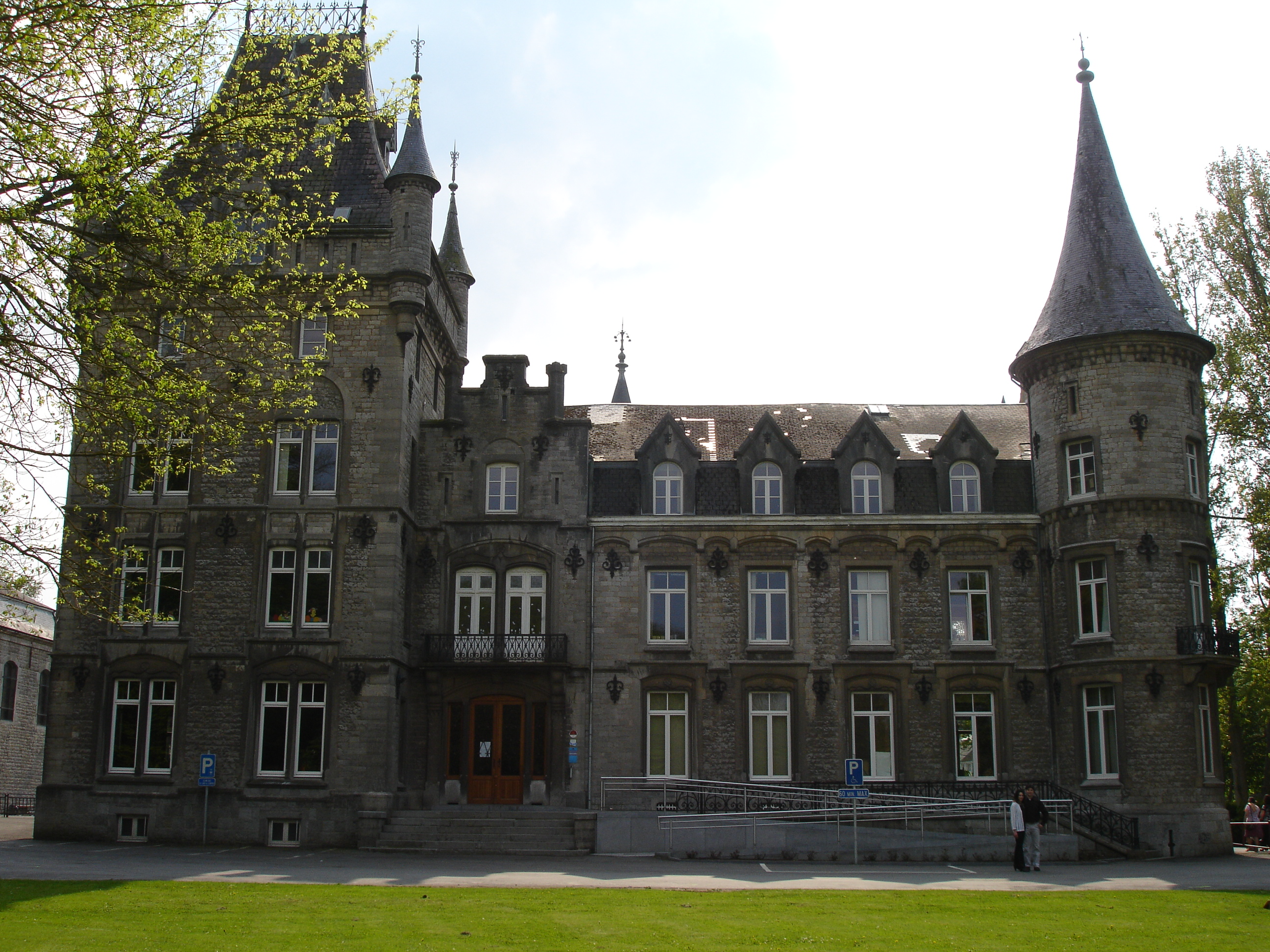
Nismes

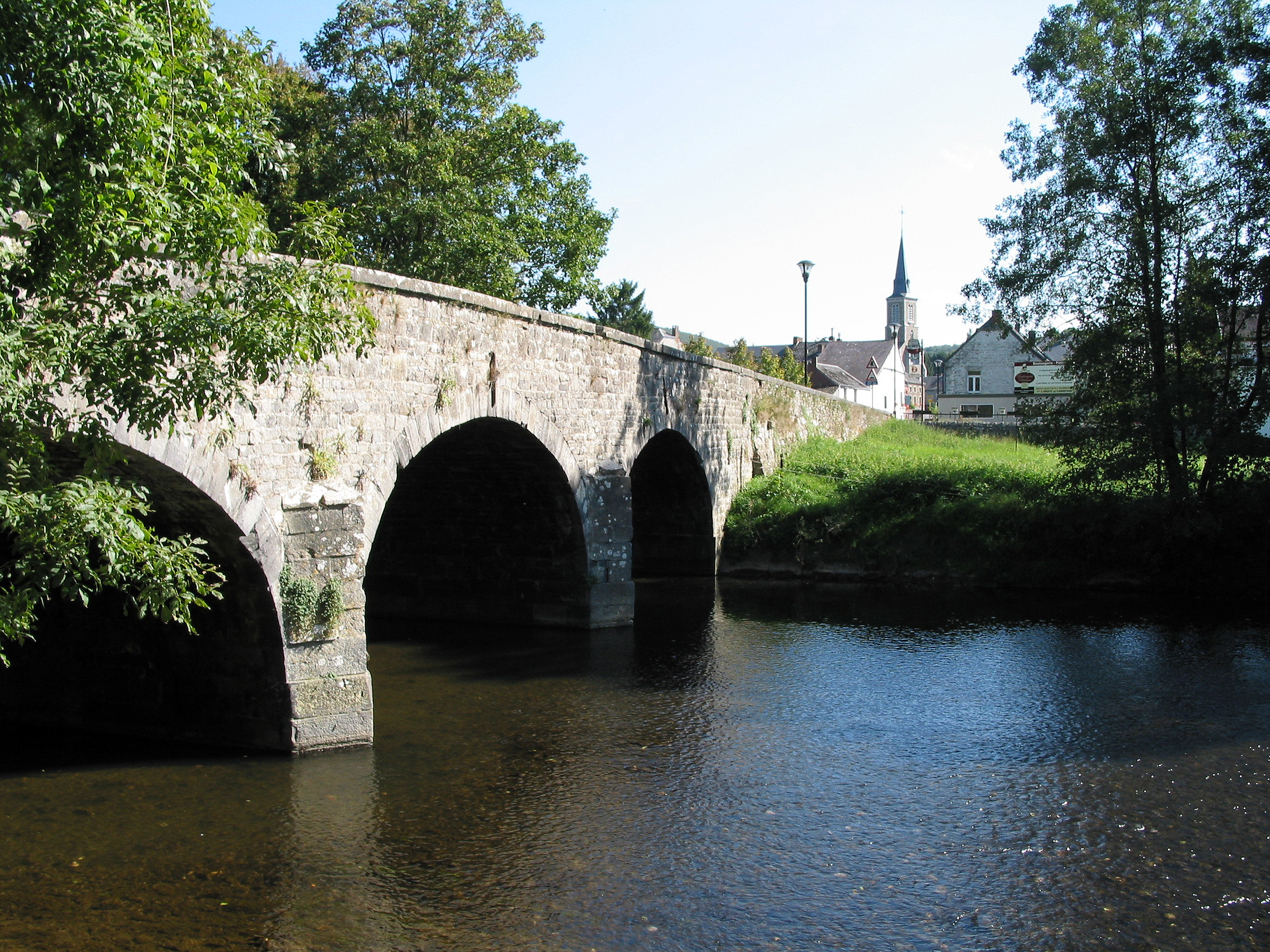
Olloy-sur-Viroin

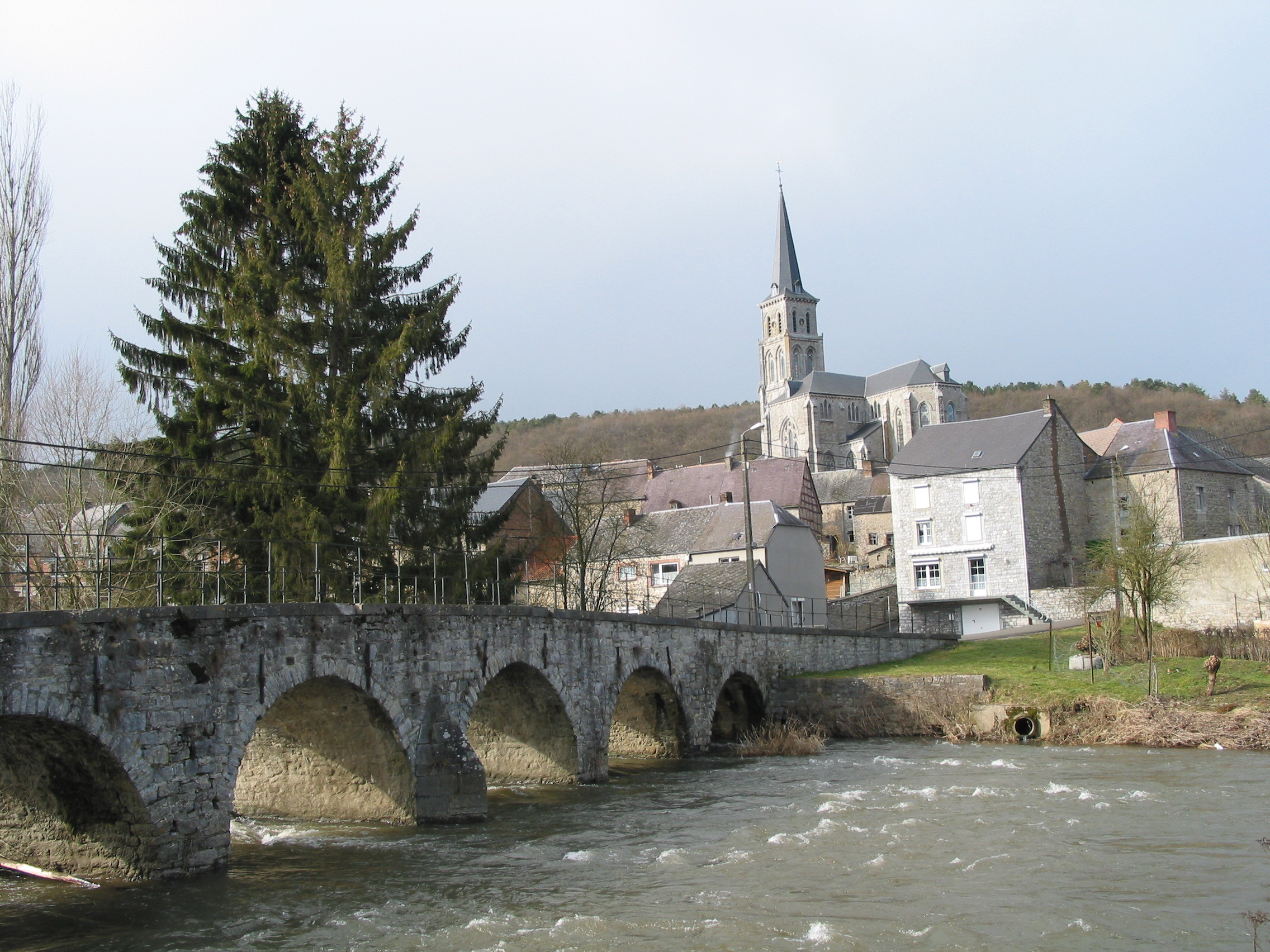
Treignes

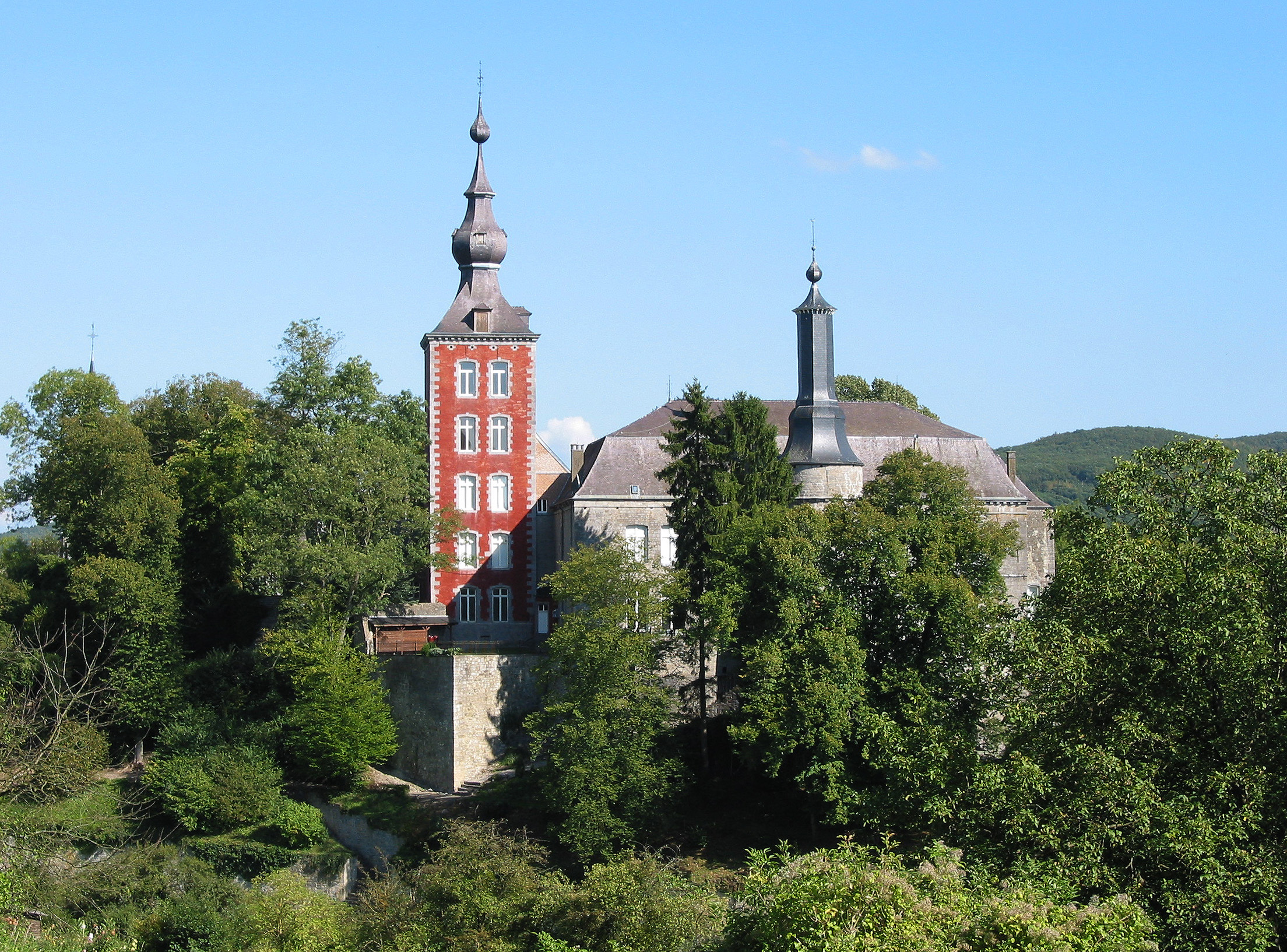
Vierves-sur-Viroin

== Attractions ==
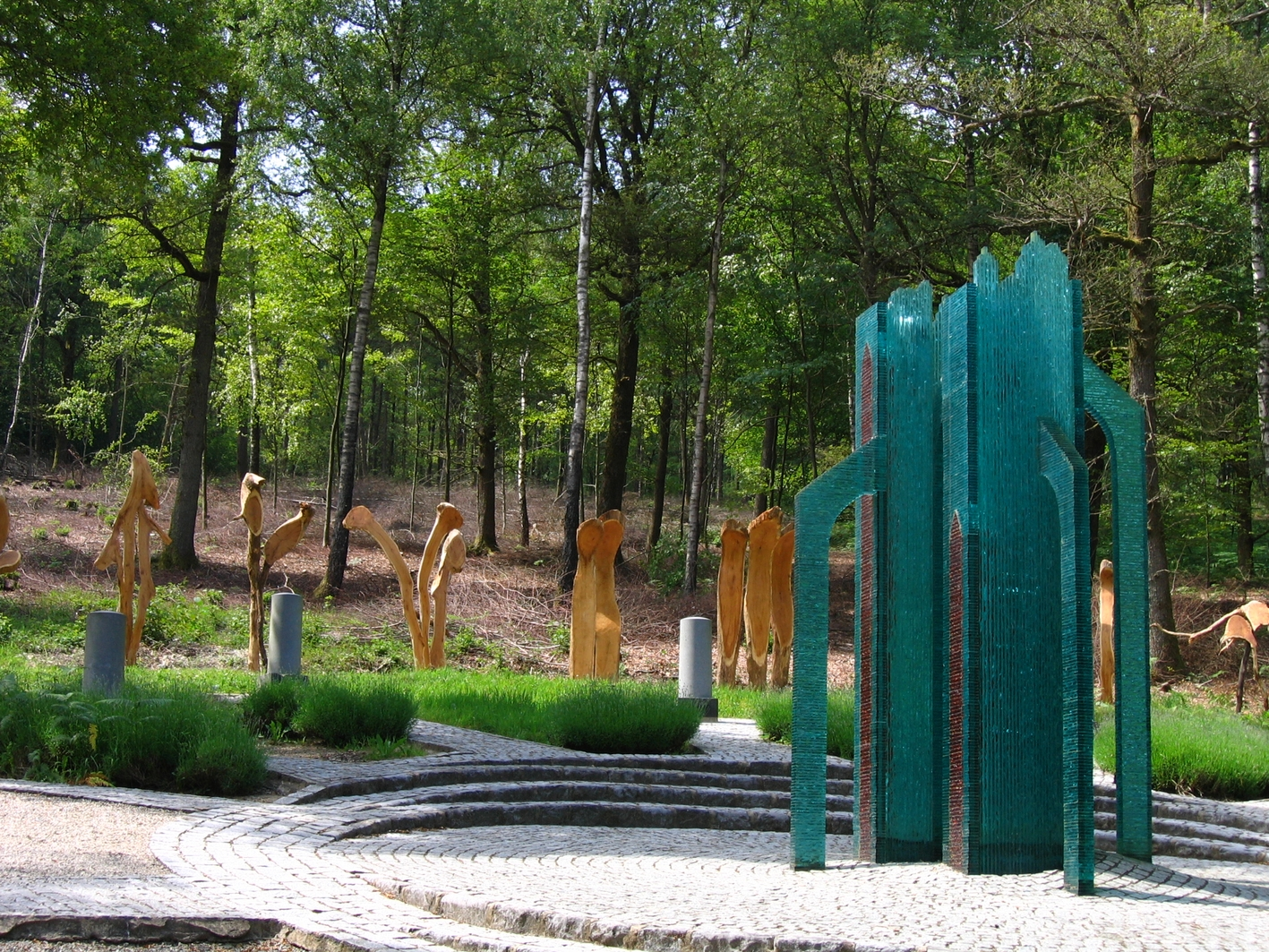
Monument for the geographical centre of the EU until its May 2004 expansion

- From 1995 to 2004, Viroinval was the location of the geographical centre of the European Union, at coordinates 50°00′33″N 4°39′59″E in Oignies-en-Thiérache, and a monument there records that finding. On May 1, 2004, the EU expanded from fifteen states to twenty-five, and the geographical centre of the union moved eastwards to the village of Kleinmaischeid, Rhineland-Palatinate, Germany. On 1 January 2007 it shifted even further south-eastwards.
- The tourist steam train line Mariembourg–Treignes has most of its stations in villages of Viroinval: Nismes, Olloy-sur-Viroin, Vierves-sur-Viroin, and Treignes. The latter village has a relevant museum.

== See also ==
- List of protected heritage sites in Viroinval
