= Beslidhja Skaut Albania =

Scouting organization in Albania

- Country: Albania
- Founded: 2004
- Membership: 1,730

Beslidhja Skaut Albania, also known as Organizata Skautiste Shqiptare Beslidhja Skaut Albania, is a scouting organization in Albania. It was founded in 2004 and became a member of the World Organization of the Scout Movement in 2005, with membership terminated in 2014. The coeducational Beslidhja Skaut Albania has 1,730 members as of 2011.

The Albanian Scouting movement also previously recognized by the World Organization of the Scout Movement was Besa Skaut Albania, the Organization of Albanian Honorable Scouts, until 2005.

== History ==
Membership badge of Organizata Skautiste Shqiptare Besa Skaut Albania. Both Scout emblems incorporate the double-headed eagle of the arms of Gjergj Kastriot Skanderbeg featured on the emblem of Albania.

Scouting in Albania traces back to 1920, when it was first founded. In 1922, Albania was among the founders of the World Organization of the Scout Movement, remaining active until 1937 when Zog of Albania banned Scouting in Albania. After World War II, the Socialist People's Republic of Albania had the Pionieret e Enverit, the Pioneers of Enver Hoxha, a local variant of the Pioneers. Scouting quickly returned to Albania in 1989 after communism collapsed in the country, in Sarandë by Dolores and Mihal Dhima, International Commissioner and Chief Scout of Besa Scouts Albania, respectively.

In July 1999, WOSM accepted Albania again as a member. The membership of Besa Skaut Albania was terminated by the World Scout Committee in 2005, and new membership was granted to Organizata Skautiste Shqiptare Beslidhja Skaut Albania, an offshoot of the older organization. In November 2014, WOSM terminated membership of Beslidhja Skaut Albania for their inability to fulfil its basic constitutional and educational requirements, with a statement supporting the establishment of a new National Scout Organisation in Albania.

== Ideals ==
The Beslidhja Scout Motto is Ji Gati, "Be Prepared" in Albanian. Other organizations use Pergatitu, Always Prepared in Albanian. The Albanian noun for a single Scout is Skaut.
