= Turkic Scout Bloc =

Multinational scouting initiative

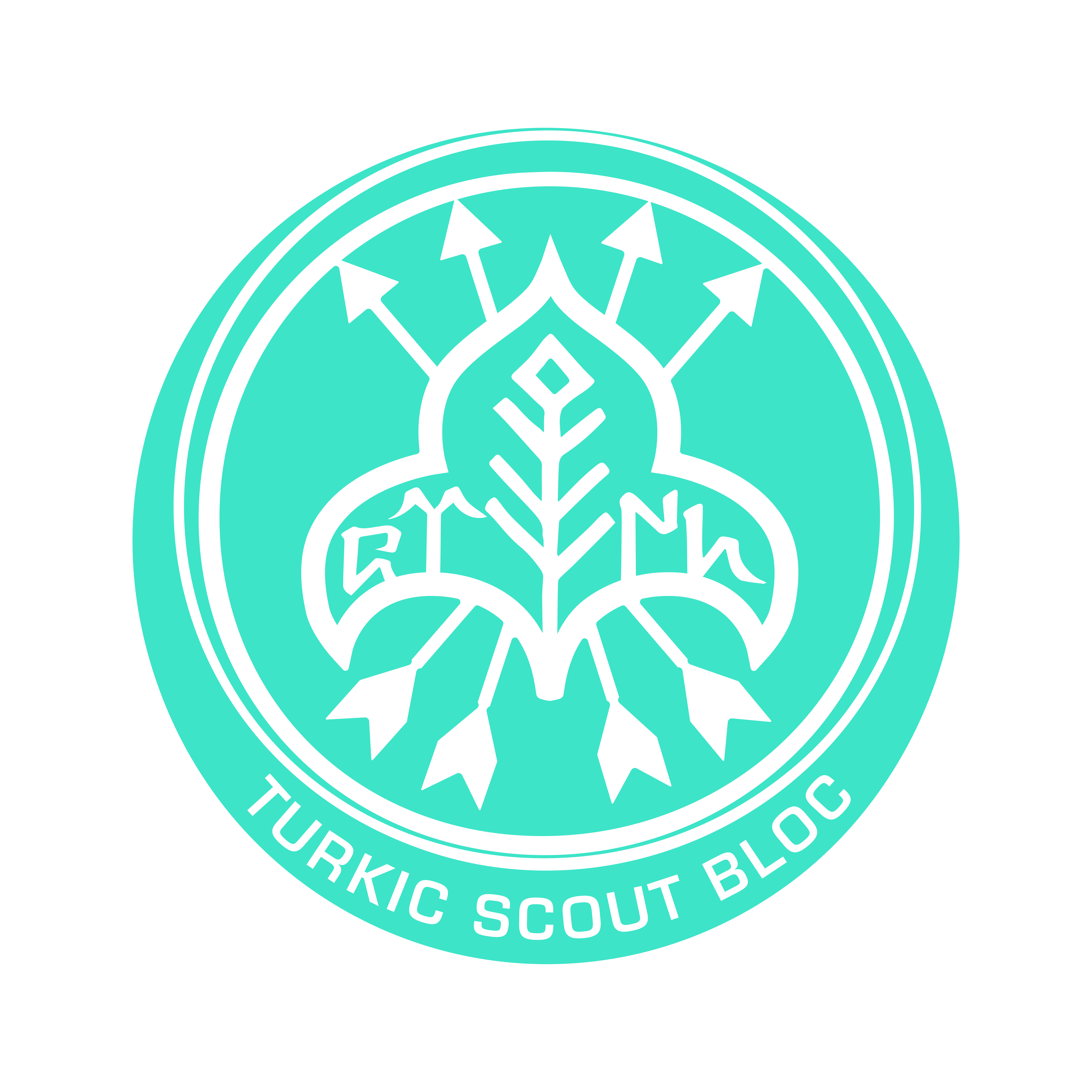
- Official logo of the Turkic Scout Bloc
- Formation: 2024
- Type: Scout organization
- Purpose: Youth development, cultural exchange
- Region served: Turkic states
- Parent organization: Affiliated with Organization of Turkic States (OTS)

The Turkic Scout Bloc is a multinational scouting initiative that unites National Scout Organizations (NSOs) from countries with Turkic heritage. It was established in 2024 as part of the Scouts of Turan project, with support from Azerbaijan's Ministry of Youth and Sports.

== History ==
The Turkic Scout Bloc was officially launched during an open session of the Scouts of Turan project in 2024. The project received support from Azerbaijan's Ministry of Youth and Sports. The establishment of the bloc represents an effort to strengthen ties between Turkic nations through scouting activities and youth development programs.

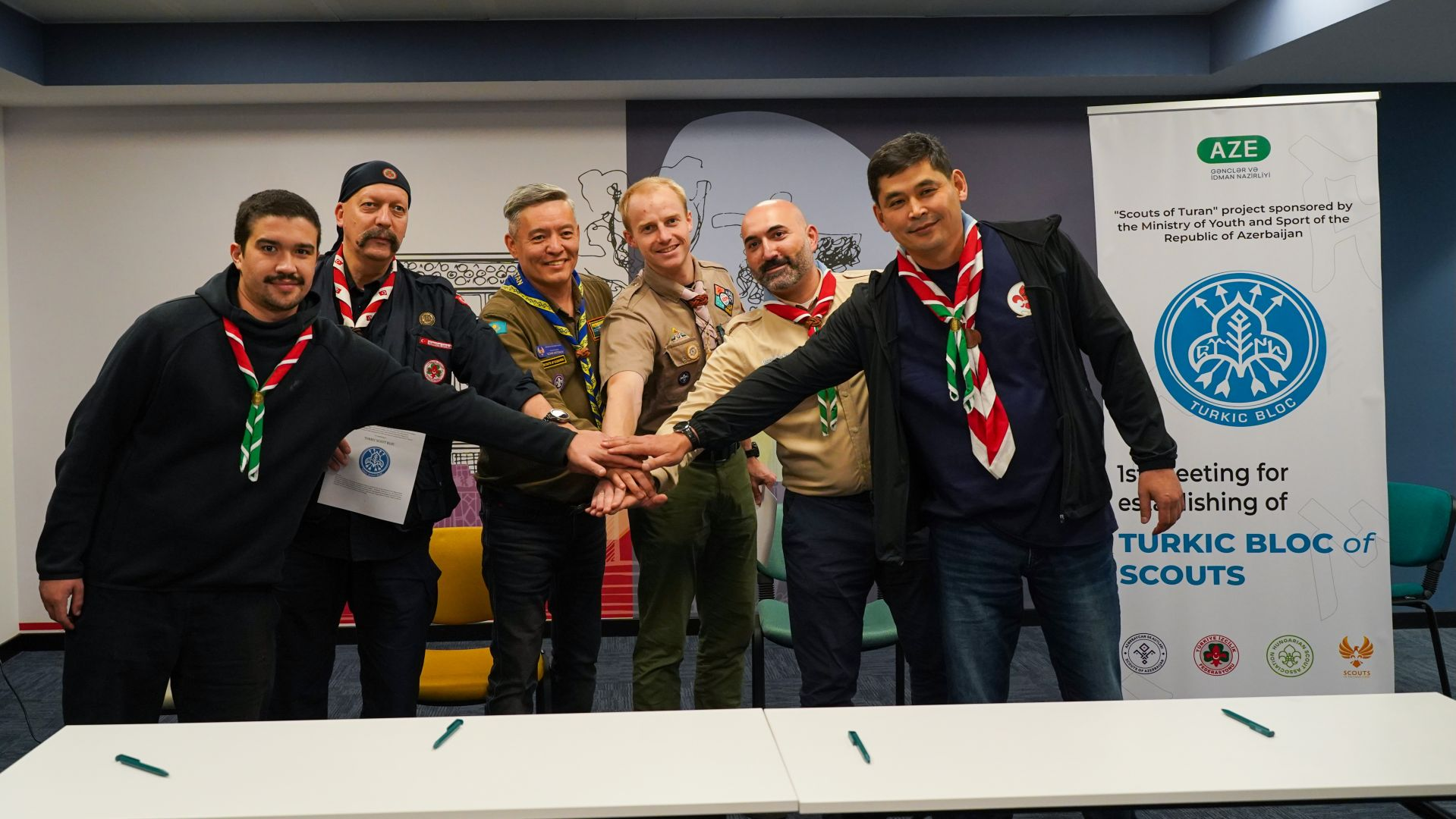
Turkic Scout Bloc Members

The founding members of the Turkic Scout Bloc include national scout organizations from Azerbaijan, Hungary, Kazakhstan, and Turkey. Representatives from Uzbekistan and Kyrgyzstan were present at the foundation event, and these countries are expected to join the bloc formally as their national scouting organizations develop. There are also plans to include Turkmenistan in the future.

== Objectives ==
The Turkic Scout Bloc seeks to promote collaboration among nations with a shared Turkic heritage and traditions. This initiative aligns with the broader vision of the Organization of Turkic States (OTS), promoting unity and cooperation among Turkic nations.

Key objectives of the bloc include:

- Connecting young people across member and observer states
- Promoting leadership development
- Facilitating cultural exchange
- Strengthening the unity among Turkic nations
- Supporting the development of scouting in emerging Turkic member states

== Key initiatives ==
The Turkic Scout Bloc has prioritized three key initiatives:

1. Unified Turkic Scout Badge Program: A common system of achievement and recognition for scouts across member countries, emphasizing shared cultural heritage and values.
2. Regional Turkic Scout Jamboree: An international gathering of scouts from Turkic nations, providing opportunities for cultural exchange and friendship building.
3. Support for Emerging NSOs: Assistance for developing National Scout Organizations in Uzbekistan and Kyrgyzstan, with plans to extend support to Turkmenistan.

Through these programs, the bloc aspires to strengthen the bonds between young people across the Turkic world while promoting the shared values and collective spirit championed by the Organization of Turkic States.

== See also ==
- Organization of Turkic States
- World Organization of the Scout Movement
- Scouting in Azerbaijan
- Scouting in Turkey
- Scouting in Kazakhstan
- Scouting in Hungary
