= Organization of Russian Young Pathfinders =

Organization of Russian Young Pathfinders may refer to

- Organization of Russian Young Pathfinders (Russia), a Russian Scouting organization
- Organization of Russian Young Pathfinders (Scouts-in-Exile), a Scouts-in-Exile organizations
