= Cyprus Turkish Scouting and Guiding Federation =

Kıbrıs Türk İzcilik Federasyonu
- Emblem of Cyprus Turkish Scouting and Guiding Federation
- Country: Northern Cyprus
- Founded: 2 August 2023
- President: Hakan İnce
- Website http://www.kibristurkizcilikfederasyonu.com

The Cyprus Turkish Scouting and Guiding Federation (Turkish: Kıbrıs Türk İzcilik Federasyonu) is a Scouting federation active in the de facto independent Turkish Republic of Northern Cyprus.

The federation was established in August 2023 within the Youth Department of Northern Cyprus, part of the Deputy Prime Ministry and Ministry of Tourism, Culture, Youth and Environment. It aims to develop scouting in the Turkish Republic of Northern Cyprus, enable scouting activities to be carried out in accordance with international scouting rules, bring together the associations dealing with scouting across the country under one roof and ensure unity.

The Scouting and Guiding Federation of Turkey played a role in the establishing of the Cyprus Turkish Scouting and Guiding Federation and there is a strong and collaborative relationship between the federations. The Turkish and Turkish Cypriot federations have organised joint camps and leadership trainings.

== Program ==
=== Program sections ===
The federation is divided into four age sections and adult leaders:

- Minik Izci - ages 4 to 6
- Küçük Izci - ages 7 to 11
- Izci - ages 12 to 14
- Ergin Izci - ages 15 to 18

=== Scout Motto ===
The Scout Motto is Daima Hazır, Always Prepared in Turkish.

=== Emblem ===
The membership badge of the Cyprus Turkish Scouting and Guiding Federation is inspired by the emblem of the Scouting and Guiding Federation of Turkey. It incorporates elements of the flag of Northern Cyprus. The trefoil represents the Girl Guides and the fleur-de-lis the Boy Scouts.

== See also ==
- Scouting and Guiding in Cyprus
- Northern Cyprus Turkish Scouts
