= Scouting and Guiding in Cyprus =

Scouting and Guiding Organizations in Cyprus

The Scout and Guide movement in Cyprus is served by

- the Cyprus Scouts Association, member of the World Organization of the Scout Movement
- the Girl Guides Association of Cyprus, member of the World Association of Girl Guides and Girl Scouts
- The Cyprus Turkish Scouting and Guiding Federation is active in Northern Cyprus and has strong ties to the Scouting and Guiding Federation of Turkey.

Former associations include:

- Scouts of Northern Cyprus (Kuzey Kıbrıs Türk İzcileri)

== International Scout units in Cyprus ==
Also, groups of the Scout Association and Girlguiding UK were active for British Scouts at the Eastern and Western Sovereign Base Areas of Akrotiri and Dhekelia.

== Ethnic Armenian Scouting ==
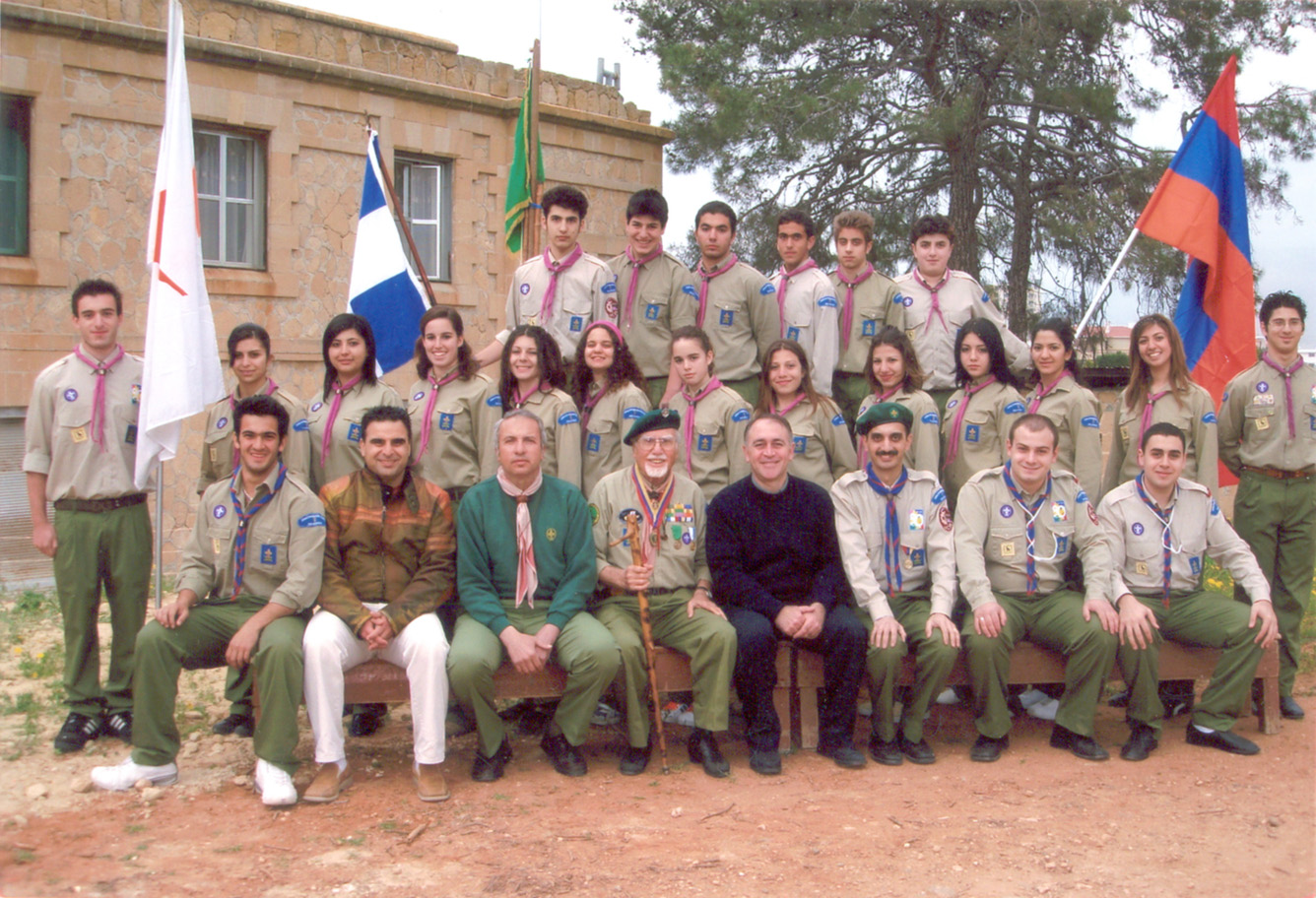
Last photo of the Melkonian Educational Institute Scouts (2006)

Scouting plays a role in the Armenian diaspora community on the island.
