= Organization of the Scout Movement of Kazakhstan =

Youth organization in Kazakhstan

- Flag of OSMK-the sky-blue color and steppe eagle are from the national flag of Kazakhstan; the violet and white colors and fleur-de-lis are symbolic of the World Scout Movement
- Kazakh: Скауттық Қoзғaлыс Ұіымы Қазақстан
- Country: Kazakhstan
- Founded: 1992
- Membership: 1,223
- Affiliation: World Organization of the Scout Movement
- Website http://www.scouts.kz/

The coeducational Organization of the Scout Movement of Kazakhstan (Kazakh: Скауттык Қoзғaлыс Ұіымы Қазақстан, romanized: Skauttyk Qozğalys Ūıymy Qazaqstan; Russian: Организация Скаутского Движения Казахстана, Organizatsiya Skautskogo Dvizheniya Kazakhstana) was officially founded in 1992, and received World Organization of the Scout Movement recognition on January 16, 2008. In 2011, it had 1,223 members.

== History ==
As far as is known, Scouting was not introduced to the region during the khanate period of the pre-Soviet era.

In 1990 a conference (or Congress) of people interested in Scouting was held in Moscow. Viktor Deimund (now the President of the Scout Movement of Kazakhstan) represented Kazakhstan at the Congress. The Congress established the Association of Russian Scouting Renaissance. The homegrown Scout troops within Kazakhstan joined the membership of the Ural Scout Region.

Viktor Deimund and Oleg Mozheyko organized the first Scout Troops in Kazakhstan in 1991. Republic-wide newspapers published the first articles on the work of Pavlodar Scout troops. Shortly thereafter, hundreds of letters came to Pavlodar from people asking for help to create Scout units. Pavlodar Scout leaders published and sent out Scouting literature, and Scout troops were created in different cities and parts of Kazakhstan.

On December 28, 1992, the Organization of the Scout Movement of Kazakhstan was registered in the Ministry of Justice, and in 1993 Scout leader training courses were made available. An All-Republic Camp (National Jamboree) "Jasybay's Arrow" was held in the summer at Jasybay, a national camp near Bayanaul National Park, Pavlodar Province, named for a Kazakh mythic hero. 1994 saw both the publication of handbook "Scouting for Everybody" and the participation of Kazakhstan Scouts in a World Scout Committee Informative Council on Scouting in Crimea. During the council, President Deimund discussed the development of Scouting in Kazakhstan with Doctor Jacques Moreillon, the Secretary General of WOSM. Leaders of Kazakh Scouts took part in the international seminar "Scouting: Youth without Borders" in Morocco. In 1995, Kazakhstan's Scouts were represented at the 18th World Scout Jamboree in the Netherlands by a small group.

Since 1994 the Organization of the Scout Movement of Kazakhstan has received financial and organizational support from the German Scout Association Bund der Pfadfinderinnen und Pfadfinder (BdP), with which they share an exchange program. 20 Guides and Scouts from the BdP travelled to Kazakhstan for the National Camp in 2002. Every year Guides and Scouts from the OSMK and BdP meet each other in camps or training courses either in Germany or Kazakhstan, helping and learning from each other. In 2006 8 Guides and Scouts from the BdP travelled to Kazakhstan for the National Camp.

In 1999, Kazakhstan held the First International Scout Camp "Kakharman-99", and in 2003 held WINGS2003, a subcamp for 10 to 14-year-olds. On October 5, 2004, the Internet Access and Training Program (IATP) brought together 20 Scouts from Kazakhstan and Uzbekistan for a two-hour online discussion of their activities from the IATP access sites in five cities in Kazakhstan and three in Uzbekistan, aimed to bring together representatives of the Scouting movements from these countries to promote friendship and cooperation. Scouts from Kazakhstan named as their main challenge a lack of funds, and the difficulty of building a successful fundraising operation.

With the 1991 breakup of the Soviet Union, it was suggested that the Türkiye İzcilik Federasyonu assist in the creation of Scouting movements in the Turkic Central Asian republics of Kazakhstan, Kyrgyzstan, Turkmenistan and Uzbekistan, but it is uncertain if this plan ever materialized.

== WOSM recognition ==
In October 2007, the World Scout Bureau received an application for membership in WOSM from the OSMK. In accordance with the requirements of the WOSM Constitution, the World Scout Committee considered this application at its meeting from September 28 to 30, 2007, and recommended that it be accepted. The OSMK was declared a WOSM member on January 16, 2008. In becoming a member of WOSM, OSMK will become a member of the Eurasia Scout Region, if it so desires.

If Kazakhstan had chosen not to become a member of the Eurasia Region, they would have been eligible to join the European Region, as Germany was responsible for the support of OSMK. The WOSM constitution contains no obligation for National Scout Organizations to join the regions, but it is strongly expected.

In October 2023, OMSK will join the Asia Pacific Region, as the Eurasian region will be dissolved.

== Program and ideals ==
Kazakhstan Scouts are expected to hold spiritual values and national loyalty, but the organization does not discriminate by faith or ethnic origin. Scouts are also expected to live up to the Scout Oath and Law and to serve their communities, which they accomplish through such activities as working with handicapped children and cleaning natural areas. The program's goal is to strengthen character and promote healthy minds, bodies and spirits in participants.

The OSMK presently has no property except a headquarters. OSMK favors youth membership and youth involvement through an active strategy to recruit youth members. The adult policy aims at supporting leadership and recruitment of volunteers.

OSMK is open to girls and boys, women and men, in four age sections:

- Junior Scouts-ages 7 to 10
- Scouts-ages 11 to 14
- Senior Scouts-ages 15 to 17
- Scout leaders are over 18

The Scout Motto is Dayyin Bol, translating as Be Prepared in Kazakh, and Bud' Gotov, translating likewise in Russian. The noun for a single Scout is Скаут in both languages. Kazakh Scouts wear a dark green uniform.

The membership badge of the Organization of the Scout Movement of Kazakhstan incorporates elements of the flag of Kazakhstan set inside the Rub El Hizb (۞).

The National Council, composed of eleven members, includes seven women and four men. OSMK has three regularly employed professional staff. The Council Chairman is Victor Georgievich Deimund, and the International Commissioner is Mrs. Ainur Shaikhimova Abylayevna.

== Scout Oath ==
On my honor, I promise that I will do my best, to do my duty to God and the Motherland, to help other people and to obey the Scout Law.

== Scout Law ==
- A Scout is devoted to the Motherland.
- A Scout is honest and truthful.
- A Scout's duty is to help others.
- A Scout is a friend to all and a brother to every other Scout.
- A Scout is courteous.
- A Scout is a friend to nature.
- A Scout obeys orders of his parents and leaders without question.
- A Scout is thrifty and he respects others property.
- A Scout smiles and never gives up.
- A Scout is diligent and persevering.
- A Scout is restrained.
- A Scout is clean in thought, word and deed.
