= National Organization of Russian Scouts =

National Organization of Russian Scouts may refer to

- National Organization of Russian Scouts (Russia), a Russian Scouting organization
- National Organization of Russian Scouts (Scouts-in-Exile), a Scouts-in-Exile organization
