= Emlen =

Emlen may refer to:

== People ==
- Emlen Etting (1905–1993), American painter, sculptor and filmmaker
- Emlen Franklin (1827–1891), American politician, lawyer and Civil War officer
- Emlen T. Littell (1838–1891), American architect
- Emlen Roosevelt (1857–1930), American banker, cousin of Theodore Roosevelt
- Emlen Tunnell (1924–1975), American professional football player and coach
- C. Emlen Urban (1863–1939), Pennsylvania-based architect
- Douglas Emlen (born 1967), American evolutionary biologist

== Other uses ==
- Emlen Peaks, an Antarctic mountain range
- Emlen Institute, an agricultural and industrial boarding school for African American and Native American children, first in Ohio, then in Pennsylvania
- Emlen Elementary School, historic elementary school in Philadelphia, Pennsylvania

== See also ==
- Emlen funnel, bird cage shaped like an inverted cone used to study birds' migratory instincts
- Emlen Physick Estate, a Victorian house museum in Cape May, New Jersey
- Emlin McClain (1851–1915), Iowa Supreme Court justice
- Emelin (disambiguation)
- Emilin (disambiguation)
- Emlyn
