= Andrea Demarmels =

Swiss scouting official

Dr. Andrea Demarmels

Regional Chair of the European Regional Scout Committee of the World Organization of the Scout Movement

Personal details
- Born: Locarno, Switzerland

Andrea Demarmels is a Swiss scouting official who served as the Regional Chair of the European Regional Scout Committee of the World Organization of the Scout Movement (WOSM). Demarmels was re-elected to the European Scout Committee with 222 votes out of 228 possible, and subsequently at the first meeting of the new Committee, the Committee appointed him its president. As Chairman of the European Scout Region he also automatically became an ex officio member of the World Scout Committee.

During the 3rd Europe-Eurasia Leadership Training and Partnership Meeting held in Tbilisi, Georgia, from 13 to 16 May 2016, Demarmels and Irina Pruidze, Chair of the Eurasian Regional Scout Committee signed the new Partnership Agreement between the two neighboring regions.
