= IATP =

IATP is an acronym that may refer to:

- Institute for Agriculture and Trade Policy, see iatp.org
- International Airlines Technical Pool, see Turkish Technic
- Internet Access and Training Program
- Interactive Agent Transfer Protocol; see List of IP protocol numbers (Hex: 0x75, protocol: #117)
