= National Association of Russian Explorers =

Russian youth organization

Национальная Организация Русских Разведчиков
- Founder: Pavel Nikolaevich Bogdanovich ru:Богданович, Павел Николаевич

The National Association of Russian Explorers (NORR; in Russian: Национальная Организация Русских Разведчиков (НОРР), Natsional'naya Organizatsiya Russkih Razvedchikov, НОРР) is a youth organization founded by former Russian Scout Pavel Nikolaevich Bogdanovich, a White emigre and veteran of the Russian Imperial army, in the late 1920s after leaving the National Organization of Russian Scouts of Colonel Oleg Pantyukhov. Also the name National Organisation of Russian Pathfinders was used.

After failing to achieve the recognition of the World Organization of the Scout Movement in London, NORR abandoned the title "Scout", favoring the term "pathfinder". It reoriented its symbolism and traditions on Russian imperial military tradition, taking particular inspiration from tsar Peter the Great's poteshniye (childhood friends of Peter who later formed his most loyal Semyonovskiy and Preobrazhenskiy guard regiments), while retaining several Scout traditions.

NORR's militaristic focus (strongest prior to the war) was aimed at preparing the youth for potential military action against the USSR in the case of a "spring campaign" of liberation, similar to émigré organizations such as ROVS. The organization continued many military traditions after the war (i.e. marching drills) for cultural reasons, but gradually abandoned military training and preparation. As did many White emigre youth organizations, NORR focused on teaching children Russian history, pre-revolutionary Russian culture (songs, dances), and Eastern Orthodox Christianity. In 1936 N.O.R.R. joined the N.T.S., an émigré Russian political movement.

NORR, like other Russian youth organizations, aimed at fighting against the assimilation of Russians, as per Bogdanovich's words (from an article titled "Paths of Work", printed in "Chasovoi", 1933 issue 114-115):

Concerning patriotism, at the moment the current Russian instructor has tasks before him that are more infinitely complicated and difficult than any of his foreign colleagues. The exclusive situation that all us Russians find ourselves in has called out a cruel enemy of the Russian youth - denationalization. One of the most exceptional patriots of his country, Marshal Foch, constantly repeated that nations of people die when they lose their memory. A peoples' memory is made of the study of exceptional occurrences and heroes of their country, pondering the givens of the peoples' experiences.

Prior to World War II the organization had its strongest chapters in Bulgaria (600 members counted in 1938) and France. In 1938 there were 12.000 members in Europe. Chapters were also active in the Far East and Morocco.

During World War II N.O.R.R. was still active in German-occupied countries including France, while the activities of the National Organization of Russian Scouts and other Russian émigré youth movements where banned. N.O.R.R. encouraged its members to join the Russian Liberation Army. The headquarters was in Warsaw from 1942 to 1944.

After the war, the organization became based in the United States. Today there are summer camps for Russian youth in the U.S. under the title Camp NORR organized by the Association of Russian Explorers Outside of Russia. The first camps were held in 1967.

Basil (Vasilii Feodorovich) Joukov [Василий Феодорович Жуков], founder of Camp NORR (USA), reposed peacefully on July 30, 2011. He is buried at the Russian Orthodox Cemetery Novo-Diveevo in Nanuet, New York.

== See also ==
- Scouting in Russia
- White emigre
- Camp N.O.R.R.
