= Viktor Deimund =

Viktor Georgiyevich Deimund (Russian: Ви́ктор Георгиевич Деймунд August 14, 1959) of Pavlodar, Kazakhstan, the chairman of the Союз Чернобыль "Chernobyl Union" public association, serves as President of the Scout Movement of Kazakhstan and was an elected volunteer member of the Eurasia Regional Scout Committee of the World Organization of the Scout Movement (WOSM).

In 1990 a conference (or Congress) of people interested in Scouting was held in Moscow. Deimund represented Kazakhstan at the Congress. The Congress established the Association of Russian Scouting Renaissance. The homegrown Scout troops within Kazakhstan joined the membership of the Ural Scout Region.

Deimund and Oleg Mozheyko organized the first Scout Troops in Kazakhstan in 1991. Republic-wide newspapers published the first articles on the work of Pavlodar Scout troops. Shortly thereafter, hundreds of letters came to Pavlodar from people asking for help to create Scout units. Pavlodar Scout leaders published and sent out Scouting literature, and Scout troops were created in different cities and parts of Kazakhstan.

Deimund studied mechanical engineering at Pavlodar Industrial Institute and Pavlodar State University S. Toraigyrov.

== Chernobyl work ==
Kazakhstan will create a single database that will store all the information of the cleanup workers of the Chernobyl accident and their descendants, through Deimund's impetus, to ensure and improve the effectiveness of targeted health care and further prevent the risk of abnormalities in their children. In the aftermath of the Chernobyl disaster, 800,000 people participated in cleanup from across the Soviet Union, 30,000 from Kazakhstan. As of 2015, the country has about 6000 of the relief crewmembers.
