= Tamara Shukakidze =

Georgian politician

Tamara Shukakidze Demuria (Georgian: თამარა შუკაკიძე დემურია born 11 June 1980) of Tbilisi, Georgia served as the Vice-Chairman of the Eurasia Regional Scout Committee of the World Organization of the Scout Movement (WOSM). Tamara serves as a Chief Humanitarian Officer with Corus International, based in Washington D.C. Among multiple roles throughout her career, she also worked as associate Director, Crisis Response and Integrated Development at FHI360, a Director of Practice, Partnerships and Innovation, Deputy Director of Strategy of the Emergency and Humanitarian Assistance Team of CARE USA based in Washington, D.C. She holds a Master of Arts degree from York St. John University and a Bachelor of Arts in Public Administration from Georgian Technical University.
