= Scouting and Guiding Federation of Turkey =

Youth organization

- Türkiye İzcilik Federasyonu
- Country: Turkey
- Founded: 1909/1992
- Founders: Ahmet Robenson, Abdurrahman Robenson, Nafi Arif Kansu, Ethem Nejat
- Membership: 37,000
- President: Hasan Dinçer Subaşı
- Affiliation: World Association of Girl Guides and Girl Scouts, World Organization of the Scout Movement
- Website http://www.tif.org.tr

Scouting and Guiding Federation of Turkey (Türkiye İzcilik Federasyonu, TİF) is the national Scouting and Guiding federation of Turkey. It serves 33,974 Scouts (as of 2011) and 2,883 Guides (as of 2006). The federation is a member of the World Organization of the Scout Movement since 1950, and the World Association of Girl Guides and Girl Scouts since 1987.

== History ==
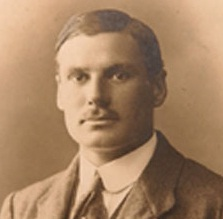
Founder of the scouting in Turkey, Ahmet Robenson

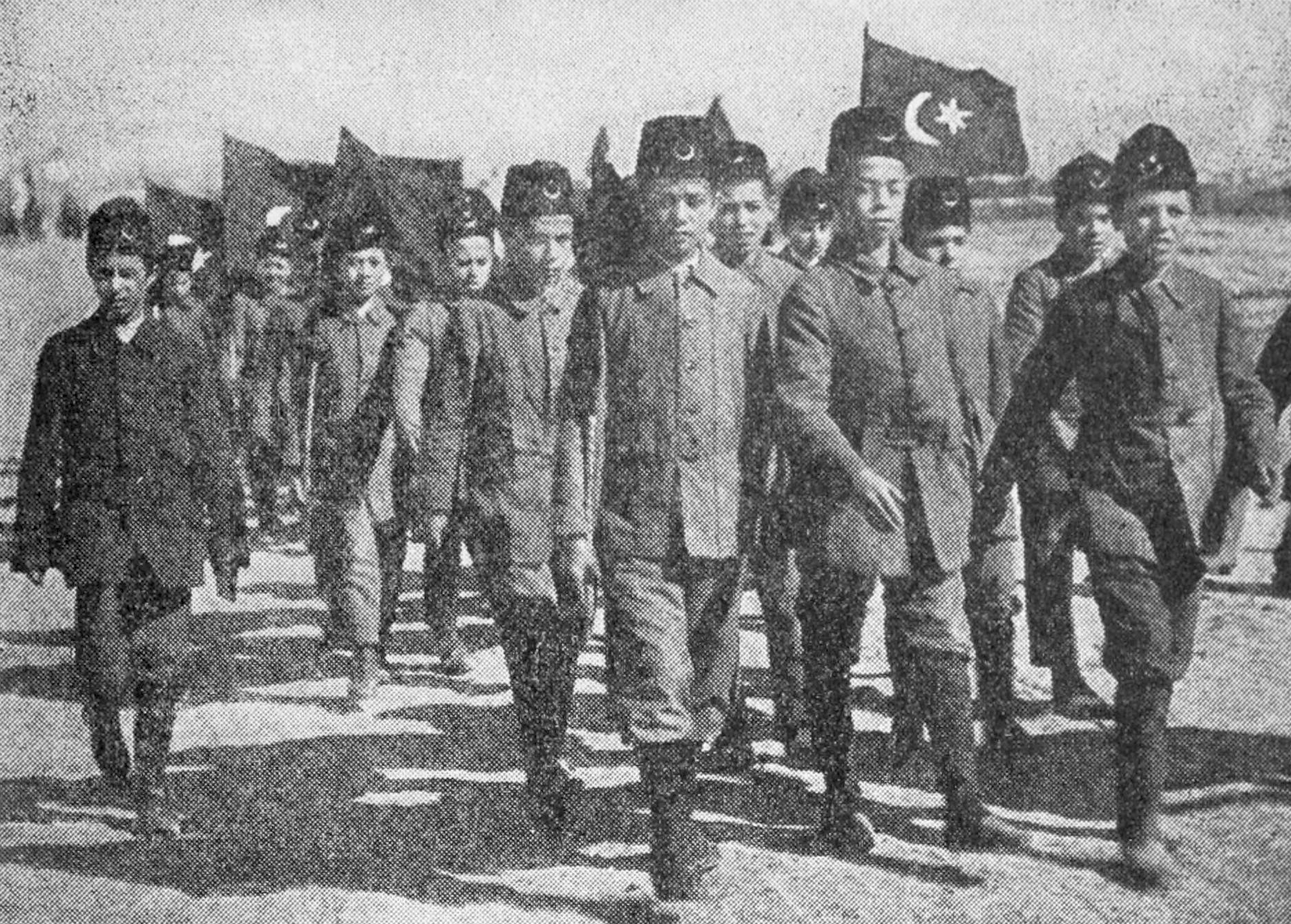
Turkish Boy Scouts, 1918

The start of Scouting in Turkey is attributed to the brothers Ahmet and Abdurrahman Robenson, who were sports teachers at the Galatasaray and Kabataş high schools in Constantinople (today: Istanbul) in 1909, and to Nafi Arif Kansu and Ethem Nejat, with first units organized at Darüşşafaka, Galatasaray, and İstanbul high schools, during the late Ottoman period.

During this same period, Scouting was created independently in outlying areas of the Ottoman Empire, most notably Lebanon and Syria.

In 1915 an Austro-Hungarian Scout unit in Constantinople was founded and served up to 1918. This unit was a member of the Österreichischer Pfadfinderbund This Scout Association supported the foundation of Scout groups in Damascus, Beirut and Aleppo.

The Scouting efforts were put to a halt during the Balkan Wars and World War I, and again gained momentum after the foundation of the Republic of Turkey in 1923, following the fall of the Ottoman Empire. In 1926, Scouting activities began to be organized nationwide in schools.

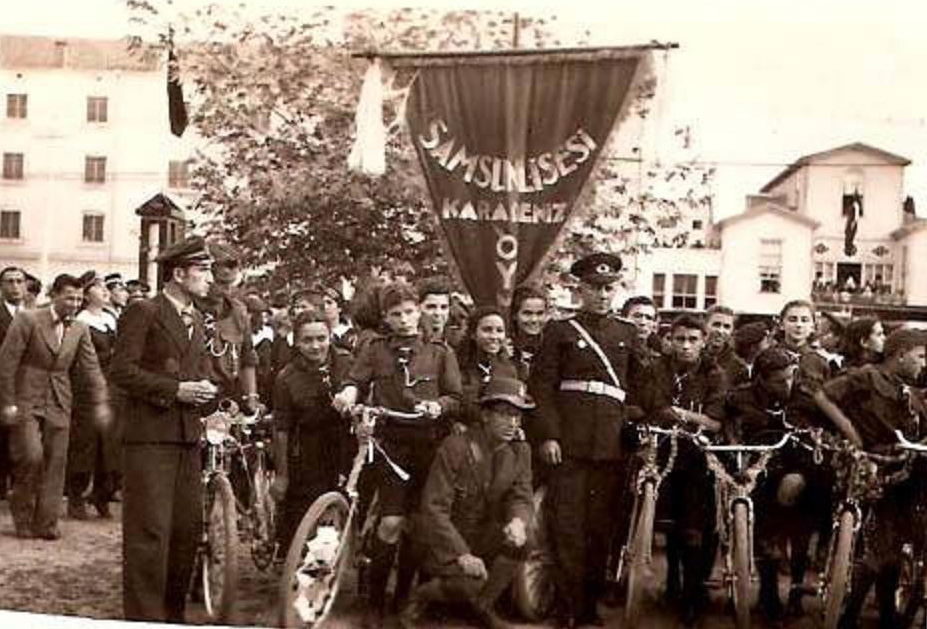
Samsun Lisesi Scouts, 1933

Ahmet Han, the Director of Scouting, and Muhittin Akdik, the Director of Education in İstanbul, visited France, the United Kingdom and Switzerland in 1946 to study Scouting and its administration, and returned determined to build up the movement on fundamental and modern lines. Sıtkı Sanoplu was responsible for starting the Cub Scout program in 1950. Cub packs existed in the coeducational primary schools, and were themselves coed, but boys and girls were placed in separate sixes, or dens. Practically all the Cubmasters were women.

J. S. Wilson, Director of the Boy Scouts International Bureau, began his 1952 tour of Asia visiting Cub Scout packs, Scout troops and Girl Guide companies in İstanbul and Ankara.

With the 1991 breakup of the Soviet Union, it was suggested that the Turkish Scouting and Guiding Federation should assist in the creation of Scout movements in the Turkic Central Asian republics of Kazakhstan, Kyrgyzstan, Turkmenistan and Uzbekistan, but it is uncertain if this plan ever materialized.

The current Scouting and Guiding Federation of Turkey was legally organized in 1992 as administratively bound to the General Directorate of Youth and Sport. In February 2007, the federation gained autonomous status.

In 2020, Turkish Ministry of Education and TİF signed a protocol, which lets Ministry and Federation work coordinated. In 2021, this protocol was canceled one-sidedly by Ministry, but it resigned in 2024.

In 2021 Presidency of Religious Affairs and TİF also signed an protocol, which lets Presidency made their own scouting activities under permission of TİF.

Currently TİF is active in 81 province and has 275,525 scouts, 285 clubs, and 788 courses affiliated to itself.

== Northern Cyprus Turkish Scouts ==
The Cyprus Turkish Scouting and Guiding Federation (Turkish: Kıbrıs Türk İzcilik Federasyonu) is a Scouting federation active in the de facto independent Turkish Republic of Northern Cyprus, and has strong ties to the Scouting and Guiding Federation of Turkey.

== Program ==
There is an annual week called "The Scout - The Helper", which gives all members of the Scouting and Guiding Federation an opportunity to participate in community service projects, where they help for a week in hospitals, at the Red Crescent association, and in similar organizations. Scouts plant trees in villages in cooperation with the Ministry of Agriculture.

In Turkey, the Battle Hymn of the Republic is sung as a Scout camp song with Turkish lyrics, by both Boy Scouts and Girl Guides.

=== Program sections ===
- Cub Scouts - ages 7 to 11
- Scouts - ages 11 to 15
- Venture Scout- ages 15 to 18

Only the Cub packs are open to boys and girls, the older sections operate in single-gender groups.

=== Scout Motto ===
The Scout Motto is Daima Hazır, Always Prepared in Turkish.

=== Scout oath ===
Turkish: Allah'a ve Vatanıma karşı vazifelerimi yerine getireceğime, izcilik türesine uyacağıma, başkalarına her zaman yardımda bulunacağıma, kendimi bedence sağlam, fikirce uyanık ve ahlâkça dürüst tutmak için elimden geleni yapacağıma şerefim üzerine ant içerim.

Translation: On my honor, I promise to do my duty to God and my country, to obey the Scout Law, to help others at all times, and to do my best to keep myself physically strong, mentally awake, and morally straight.

=== Emblem ===
The membership badge of the Scouting and Guiding Federation of Turkey incorporates elements of the coat of arms as well as the flag of Turkey. The trefoil represents the Girl Guides and the fleur-de-lis the Boy Scouts.

== Uniform ==
=== For head ===
Hat: Must be navy blue and must have emblem of TİF on front.

Bandanna: Must be navy blue and must be sized as 60x60, 70x70, 80x80 or 90x90, also must contain emblem of TİF on front when worn.

Scarf: Must be navy blue, be sized as 175x75 cm and shaped as rectangle. Must contain emblem of TİF and emblem must be visible when worn. (The part closest to heart must contain it with 3.5 cm sized)

Baf: Must be navy blue and must contain emblem of TİF which must be on forehead and visible when worn.

Beret: Must be navy blue, specially made for protecting head from cold and must be contain emblem of TİF visible from front.

=== For scarf ===
The scarf sits above the collar and its ends reach up to the belly button level at the front. 10 cm appears between the top point and the tip of the triangle formed at the back. Provided that this appearance is taken into consideration, the scarf can be 70x70, 80x80 or 90x90 in size.

==== Scout scarf ====
Each club has its own unique scarf colour. Scout scarves must consist of two colors chosen by the club they are affiliated with. Candidate Scouts wear pink scarfs.

==== Leader scarf ====
Each rank of leader got their special colour. Leaders must wear scarfs colored with their rank.

=== For top ===
Shirt: Must be light gray, one piece and epaulettes on shoulders. With buttons or snaps and pockets on each breast. On left pocket, must be Federation Emblem (Turkish writing), Turkish flag and writing Turkish Scouts (Türkiye İzcileri in Turkish). On right pocket, can be emblem of club that a scout is affiliated with.

T-shirt: Short- or long-sleeve, can be navy blue, red, turquoise or green.

=== For bottom ===
Belt: Buckle with emblem of WOSM or WAGGGS, transverse 2.5–4 cm, from perlon or leather and colored as black or navy blue.

Trousers: Dark navy blue, long and belted at the waist. 2 pockets at back covered from up, 4 pockets at front covered from up (2 close to waist and 2 at knee), with 7 archways on waist.

Socks: Dark navy blue or black. There should be scout writing on the right and left.

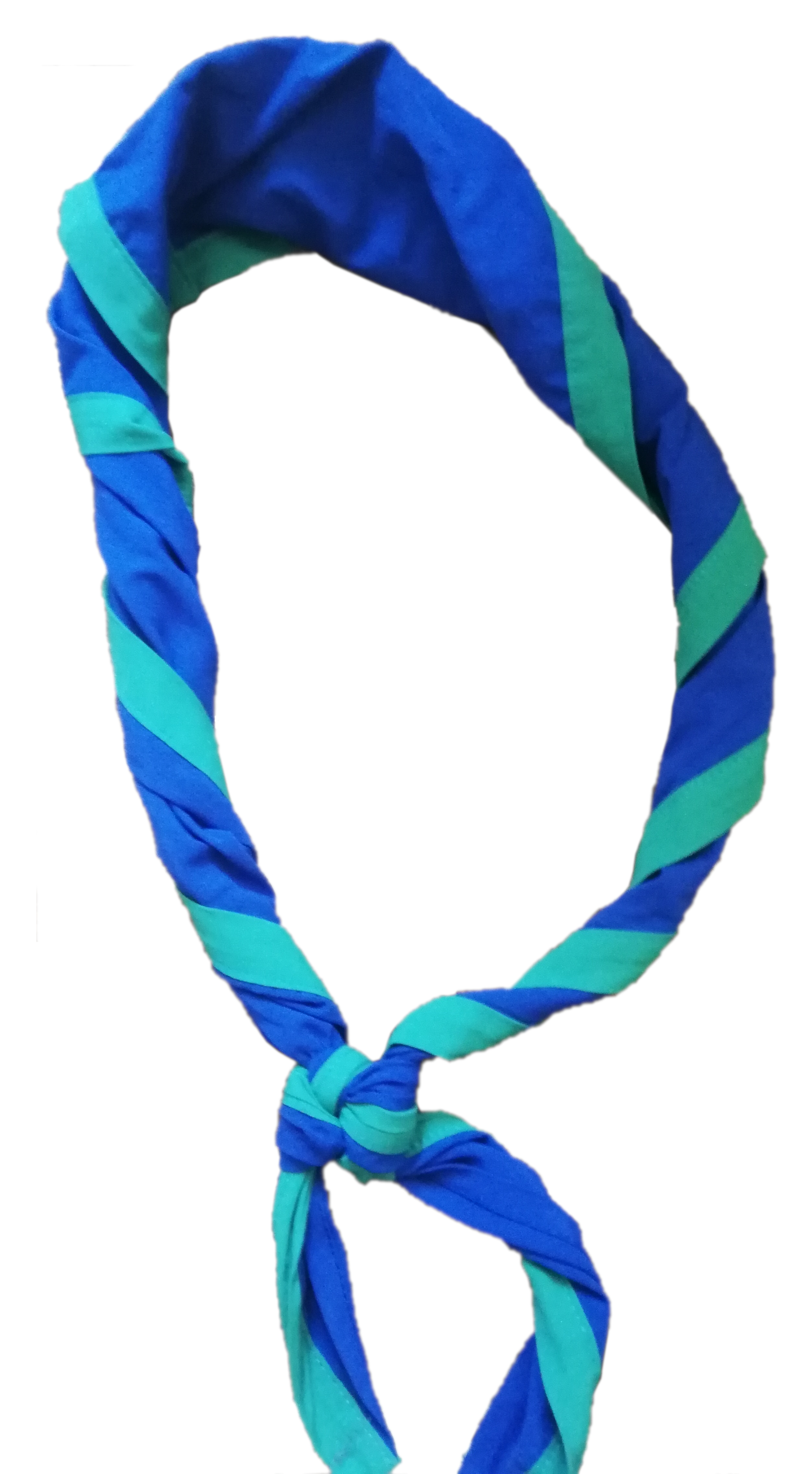
One of the double-colour neckerchief on use in turkey
