= Always Ready =

Always Ready may refer to:

- Club Always Ready, a Bolivian football club
- Always Ready (TV series), a Hong Kong drama series
- Semper paratus, a Latin phrase meaning "always ready" that is the motto of several organizations
- Always prepared, the motto of the communist pioneer movement

== See also ==
- NWA Alwayz Ready, a wrestling pay-per-view event
