= Pruidze =

Pruidze may refer to:

- Giorgi Pruidze
- Irina Pruidze
- Samson Pruidze
