= Eurasian Scout Region (World Organization of the Scout Movement) =

- Owner: World Organization of the Scout Movement
- Headquarters: Kyiv, Ukraine
- Defunct: 1 October 2023
- Website www.scout.org/eurasia

Eurasian Scout Region
Member states
- Armenia
- Azerbaijan
- Belarus
- (Georgia (country)) Georgia
- Kazakhstan
- Moldova
- (Russia) Russian Federation
- Tajikistan
- Ukraine
Potential member states
- Kyrgyzstan
- Turkmenistan
- Uzbekistan

The Eurasian Scout Region (Russian: Евразийский Скаутский Регион, Ukrainian: Євразійський скаутський регіон) was the divisional office of the World Scout Bureau of the World Organization of the Scout Movement, (in Russian Всемирной Организации Скаутского Движения or ВОСД) headquartered in Kyiv, formerly located at Gurzuf near Yalta-Krasnokamianka, Ukraine, with a branch office in Moscow. All the formerly communist states of Central and Eastern Europe, Central Asia and the Soviet Union have developed or are developing Scouting in the wake of the renaissance in the region. These include most of the successor states to the Soviet Union, in the Commonwealth of Independent States. The 1996/99 Triennial Report of the World Scout Committee/World Organization of the Scout Movement shows that WOSM is aggressively pursuing the organization of Scouting activities in the countries of the former Soviet Union, according to its own vision.

In 1997, WOSM created the new Eurasian Region, ostensibly to assist in the rebirth of Scouting in the 12 former Soviet Republics: Armenia, Azerbaijan, Belarus, Georgia, Kazakhstan, Kyrgyzstan, Moldova, Russia, Tajikistan, Turkmenistan, Ukraine, and Uzbekistan. Several of the organizations in the Region were borne from existing Scouts-in-Exile organizations. Russian was made the working language, and eight Scouting manuals and handbooks have been published, all in Russian. A quarterly periodical, also in Russian, is printed in the branch office in Moscow. The report states, "The regional office will regularly translate WOSM documents into Russian." The executive director of this region is Iurie Emilian of Moldova.

The five national Scouting organizations that were first accepted as members in the World Organization of the Scout Movement-Armenia, Belarus, Georgia, Moldova and Tajikistan, were designated by WOSM as the founding members of the Eurasia Region. Azerbaijan, Russia, and Ukraine have since been accepted into WOSM; Belarus lost its membership in 2005 and regained it in 2010. It is this regional office that is now advising the WOSM on possible member organizations. In countries where there is more than one Scouting association, like Kyrgyzstan and Ukraine, these associations can choose to cooperate and form a National Scout Organization.

A WOSM joint Eurasian-and-European Scout meeting was held in Kyiv in April 2009.

In 2023, the Region, in consultation with the European and Asia-Pacific Regions as well as the World Scout Committee decided to dissolve on 30 September. Ukraine, Moldova, Belarus, Georgia, Armenia, and Azerbaijan joined the European Region on 1 October, while Kazakhstan, Russia and Tajikistan joined the Asia-Pacific Region.

== Controversies ==
However, there is some controversy, in addition to the aforementioned publication of documents only in the Russian language, as several within the Eurasian Region's top hierarchy are former Pioneer leaders. The primary goal of the Pioneers, whose membership was compulsory, was the indoctrination of youth into Communism. To complicate matters, these organizations adopted many of the trappings of the Scout organizations they supplanted. Because of the negative experience with the Communist youth organizations, Scouting in the Eurasian Region is having a slow rebirth. Proponents see the inheritance of Pioneer work and properties in a positive light. Opponents have seen the Eurasian Region as a tool that would allow former Pioneers to keep their influence over post Soviet youth movements, and use their newfound connections outside the region for their own gain. Even the placement of the Regional headquarters at the historic Pioneer Camp Artek at Yalta appears to many to point to this Pioneer dominance. Opponents also question the fact that authoritarian Belarus was an early member of the World Organization of the Scout Movement, against WOSM's stated guidelines, while democratic neighbor Ukraine was not a WOSM member until 2008. In the years following its creation, the Eurasian Region was considered by some to have stagnated in its purpose: among other things, the official website was not updated between 2004 and February 2006.

Alternate solutions proposed at the time of the Soviet breakup, and still considered viable options by the critics of the Eurasian Region, would be to divide the Region into the previously existing European or Asia-Pacific Scout Regions, along cultural lines and national preference, to provide Scouts fresh perspective. As the Baltic states-Estonia, Lithuania and Latvia-joined the European Region, there is precedence for this solution. In addition, there is no corresponding Eurasian Region for the World Association of Girl Guides and Girl Scouts, the republics are divided geographically between WAGGGS' Europe Region and Asia Pacific Region. Besides their shared tsarist and Soviet past, the 12 members of the Eurasian Region have little in common. Some, like Armenia and Azerbaijan, have waged war on each other, some like Georgia and Ukraine, allow open opposition, while others, like Belarus and Turkmenistan, have turned to authoritarianism reminiscent of Soviet times. Further, as none of the republics have had their Scout movements returned for much more than a decade, it is viewed that they would benefit from the expertise of the neighboring Scout associations in those Regions.

In 2011 the Association of Scouts of Tajikistan officially addressed the World Scout Committee with the pledge to join the Asia-Pacific Scout Region.

== Eurasian Region Scout Jamborees ==
The region runs or sponsors periodic region-wide jamborees:

- 1st Eurasian Scout Jamboree-Byurakan, Armenia – August 2006
- 2nd Eurasian Scout Jamboree-Orhei, Moldova – July 21–30, 2010
- 3rd Eurasian Scout Jamboree-Burabay, Kazakhstan – July 20-29, 2014
- 4th Eurasian Scout Jamboree-Minsk, Belarus – July 15-22, 2018

== Eurasia Regional Scout Committee ==
The members of the Eurasia Regional Scout Committee are at present:

Post	NSO	Name	Terms
Chairman	Moldova	Sergiu Chirică	2016–
Vice-Chairman	Georgia	Irina Pruidze	2012–
Vice-chairman	Kazakhstan	Viktor Deimund	2012–
Member	Russia	Andrey Yemelin	2009–
Member	Belarus	Inna Halubets	2015–

== See also ==
- Piet J. Kroonenberg
