= Andrei Emelin =

Russian scouting official

- Андрей Емелин

Chief Executive of Russian Association of Scouts/Navigators

Andrei Emelin (Russian: Андрей Емелин, born 4 August 1967) of Russia is the Chief Executive of Russian Association of Scouts/Navigators, Chairman of the Central Executive Committee of the All-Russian Scout Association and was an elected volunteer member of the former Eurasia Regional Scout Committee of the World Organization of the Scout Movement (WOSM).

Emelin studied at Moscow State Pedagogical University, worked for Uchitelskaya Gazeta and lives in Moscow.
