= Association of Scouts of Azerbaijan =

National Scouting organization of Azerbaijan

- The third iteration from 2016 was the last traditional Scout design
- Azeri: Azərbaycan Skautlar Assosiasiyası
- Headquarters: Ceyhun Hacıbəyli 168 Street
- Location: AZ1106, Baku
- Country: Azerbaijan
- Founded: October 11, 1997
- Founder: Namik Jafarov
- Membership: 1,571
- President: Ilyas Ismayıllı
- Affiliation: World Organization of the Scout Movement, World Association of Girl Guides and Girl Scouts
- Website https://www.scout.az Anthem of the Azerbaijan Scouts Association

The Association of Scouts of Azerbaijan (Azerbaijani: Azərbaycan Skautlar Assosiasiyası, ASA) the national Scouting organization of Azerbaijan, was founded in 1997, and became the 150th member of the World Organization of the Scout Movement on 20 August 2000. In 2017 it was admitted as a full member in the World Association of Girl Guides and Girl Scouts. The coeducational association has 1,571 registered members as of 2021, about 35% are girls.

== History ==
ASA was founded on October 11, 1997, when Namik Jafarov, former president of the association, gathered the first members of the new movement and held the first Scout camp in Nabran. On August 20, 2000, ASA was invited to join WOSM and the Eurasia Scout Region. Branch offices exist in Shaki Rayon, Barda Rayon, Nakhchivan, Ismailli Rayon, Khachmaz Rayon, Zaqatala Rayon, Aghjabadi Rayon, Ganja, and Yevlakh Rayon.

As of 2004, there are 1,356 registered Scouts and leaders. Half of the registered Scouts live in the capital city of Baku. The remainder is spread throughout the countryside. Scouts of Azerbaijan participated in the 1998–1999 World Scout Jamboree in Chile, as well as several regional National Jamborees, and the second Eurasian Scout Conference, held in Baku in September, 2004.

The Scouts are members of the National Assembly of Youth Organizations of the Republic of Azerbaijan (NAYORA).

There was a parliamentarian interest group to create an Association of Azerbaijan Girl Guides, but this lapsed prior to 2003. A delegation from the World Association of Girl Guides and Girl Scouts visited Azerbaijan between 29 and 31 January 2016 and discussed the possibilities of membership in the WAGGGS by 2017. Members of the WAGGGS delegation met with the president and national committee of ASA, Baku, Sheki, and Bilasuvar Scout groups, NAYORA president Seymur Huseynov, Deputy Minister of Youth and Sport of the Republic of Azerbaijan Intigam Babayev, and Head of the Department İndira Hajiyeva.

In January 2019, a new fourth iteration of branding for the ASA was launched, which incorporates the Azerbaijan carpet of Gasimushagy subgroup, ophrys caucasica, and clover as stylized form of the heraldic trefoil, used as the main element in the logo of most Girl Guiding and Girl Scouting organizations.

== 2019-2023 ==
In October 2023, the ASA joined the European Scout Region, as the Eurasian Scout Region was dissolved.

== Ideals and program ==
The Scout Motto is Daima Hazır, Be Prepared in Azeri. The Azeri noun for a single Scout is Skaut.

The Scout emblem incorporates the tricolor blue-red-green colors of the flag of Azerbaijan with two five edged stars rounded by rope and tied in a reef knot at the bottom. The Scout uniform consists of a khaki-colored shirt with shoulder straps, with adjustable sleeves, khaki-colored trousers or shorts, with a brown belt, and a tricolor blue-red-green neckerchief with a white border edge.

- 6–12 Cub Scouts
- 12–18 Scouts
- 18-above Rovers and Leaders

The Scout promise is "On my honor I promise that I will do my best, to do my duty to my community and Azerbaijan, to help other people at all times, to obey the Scout Law."

== Emblem ==
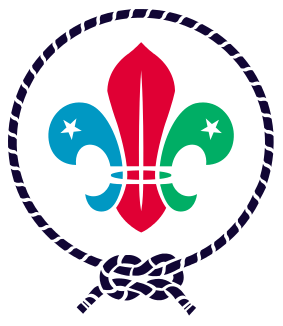
1997-2013

2013-2018
