= Scouting in Kyrgyzstan =

Multiple Scout associations in Kyrgyzstan

The membership badge of Scouting in Kyrgyzstan incorporates elements of the flag of Kyrgyzstan as well as traditional folk art.

Scouting in Kyrgyzstan was founded in November 1994 and is not yet a member of the World Organization of the Scout Movement, but is working toward WOSM recognition. Kyrgyzstan has multiple Scout associations, several of which are members of Kyrgyz Respublikasynyn Skaut Kengesh (Кыргыз Республикасынын Скаут Кеңеш), the Kyrgyz Republic Scouting Union.

== Program and ideals ==
The goals of the Kyrgyz Republic Scouting Union federation are the creation of a Scout movement with a uniquely Kyrgyz character, guidelines for Scout membership and for training of leaders and application to the World Organization of the Scout Movement (WOSM). Among the multiple organizations, some are separated by gender—some for boys, others for girls—while others are coeducational. Various Scout factions in Bishkek agreed in 1995 that they wanted light blue uniforms, as light blue is the Kyrgyz color of courage and generosity (see also Mongolyn Skautyn Kholboo), and several world Scouting alumni organizations offered to make uniform insignia for the fledgling Kyrgyz Scouts, free of charge.

== History ==
Website of Scouts of Kyrgyzstan

On October 29, 2004, six Scouts of Kyrgyzstan posted an official website for their organization after a weeklong Web design course at the Internet Access and Training Program (IATP) access site in Bishkek. The website contains pages about Scouting's mission, the history of Scouting in Kyrgyzstan and some of its activities, a copy of the organization's charter, a photo gallery, list of donors, a forum, and contact information. Организация Скауты Кыргызстана (ОСКыр) leader Evgeniî Shmelëv (originally leader of the Speleoklub "Надежда", the "Hope" Sporting Association, an early precursor to Scouting locally) remarked, "The Scouting movement in Kyrgyzstan is in its initial stage, and we hope to unite people who have common interests and enthusiasm under one identity called 'Scouts'. Moreover, we hope to get support from Scouting movements of foreign countries through the website." The Scouts have pledged to keep their website updated and maintain it as a dynamic, living online resource.

It is reported that total registered membership is 300.

The Scout Motto is "Dayar Bol", translating as "Be Prepared" in Kyrgyz, and "Bud' Gotov", translating likewise in Russian. The noun for a single Scout is Скаут in both languages.

== Program sections ==
- Cub Scouts-7 to 11
- Scouts-12 to 15
- Rovers-16 to 20

Membership badge of the Kyrgyzstan Skaut-Kyzdar Assotsiatsiyasy

== Kyrgyzstan Girl Scouts Association ==
The Kyrgyzstan Girl Scouts Association, Kyrgyzstan Skaut-Kyzdar Assotsiatsiyasy (KSKA), founded in September 1997, currently has 186 members. Aigul' Duîsheyevna Duîsheyeva is the chairwoman. KSKA, whose symbol is the snow leopard (Uncia uncia), has headquarters on köchösü Bokonbayev in Bishkek, courtesy of the Kyrgyzstan Women's Congress. Work towards World Association of Girl Guides and Girl Scouts membership recognition progressed in the late 1990s, but now remains unclear.

Membership badge of ОСКыр, showing the favored light blue uniform color

== Multiple Kyrgyz Scout associations ==
Some of the multiple organizations sponsoring Scouting activities in Kyrgyzstan include

- Organization of Scouts of Kyrgyzstan (OSKyr) Организация Скауты Кыргызстана (ОСКыр), linked internationally to the Organization of Russian Young Pathfinders (ORYuR) Организации Российских Юных Разведчиков (ОРЮР)
- Kyrgyz Respublikasynyn Skauttarynyn Koomduk Birikmesi (KRSKB), the Public (Boy Scout) Scouts Union, currently functions in four of the seven dubans of Kyrgyzstan. The KRSKB plans to open a Scout café to earn money for their organization.
- Kyrgyz Skaut Uyumu, the Kyrgyz Scout Association
- Nezavisimyi Skautskîi Otryad shkoly No. 13 (Independent Scout Troop, School No. 13)
- the "Leader" Club for High School and University Students, Karakol
- Respublikanskîi Tsentr dlya Detei i Yunoshestva "Seitek"/Kyrgyz Respublikasynyn Baldar jana Ospurumdor Borboru "Seitek" (Seitek Independent School Association Republic Center for Children and Youth/Kyrgyz Republic Center for Children and Youth)
- Klub Zashchity Okruzhayushchei Sredy shkoly No. 28, Bishkek (the "Ilbirs" Children's Environmental Club, School No. 28, Bishkek)

== International exchanges ==
Kyrgyzstan's Scouts have an international relationship with Pikes Peak Council in Colorado.

== See also ==
- World Organization of the Scout Movement
- Organization of the Scout Movement of Kazakhstan
- Ittihodi Scouthoi Tojikiston
- Scouting in Turkmenistan
- Scout Association of Uzbekistan
- Scouting and Guiding in Mainland China

== External links and references ==
- official website
