= Russian Association of Girl Scouts =

- Russian Association of Girl Scouts
- Headquarters: Moscow
- Country: Russia
- Founded: 1994
- Membership: 2,255
- Affiliation: World Association of Girl Guides and Girl Scouts

Brownie	Scout

Russian Association of Girl Scouts (Russian: Росси́йская Ассоциа́ция де́вочек-ска́утов, Rossiyskaya Assotsiatsiya Devochek-Skautov) is the national Girl Scouting organization of Russia. Guiding in Russia started about 1910 within the Boy Scout groups and was disbanded in the 1920s. It was restarted in 1990 as part of the Federation of Scouts of Russia and formed an independent association in 1994. The organization became an associate member of the World Association of Girl Guides and Girl Scouts (WAGGGS) in 1999 and a full member in 2008. The girls-only association has 1,158 members (as of 1998).

== Development of the Movement ==
Scouting developed across many areas of Russia relatively quickly, perhaps as early as 1909. There are records of girl patrols in a range of towns from this time onward, but there was no national girls’ organisation.

Scouting was banned in 1919, and the Young Pioneers became the official state youth organisation. Many units continued to exist unofficially, but all had ceased by the mid 1920's.

Scouting returned in the years of perestroika. Many international contacts were made with foreign visits and aid offered as a result of the Chernobyl disaster. There was much interest on an international level in bringing Scouting back to Russia.

In 1991 FSR (Federation of Scouts of Russia) was created and almost immediately there was discussion on a programme specifically for girls. In 1993 in Perm the founding conference of the League of Girl Scouts of FSR took place. The girls’ programme and Movement developed, and in 1994 in October in Perm the next step was taken as the Russian Association of Girl Scouts had its founding conference. Representatives of WAGGGS and Girl Scout leaders from across the country (including other Scouting organisations as well as FSR) were present. A national board was elected and RADS as it is known today was established.

In 1996 RADS had its first National Girl Scout camp, and its biannual conference met again in Perm. The structure of the Association was altered slightly for more efficient management and expansion. All through the revival of Girl Scouting in Russia and the formation of RADS, much support in many forms was given by the UK as link country.

Russian Association of Girl Scouts

== Girl Scout ideals ==
The Girl Scout emblem has incorporated three snowdrops since the tsarist period.

=== Girl Scout Promise ===
Obeshaniya Chestnym slovom obeshayu sdelat’ vsyo ot menya zavisyasheye, shtoby vypolnit’ svoi dolg pered stranoi i stremitsa k dukhovnomu sovershenstvu, pomogat’ tyem, kto nuzhdaetsa v moei pomoshi, i zhit’ po zakononam devochek-skautov.

On my honour, I promise that I will do my best: To serve my country, To strive for spiritual perfection, To help those who need my help, and To live by the Girl Scout Law

=== Girl Scout Law ===
1. A Girl Scout's honour is to be trusted
2. A Girl Scout always finishes what she has started
3. A Girl Scout does her best to be useful and help others
4. A Girl Scout is friendly, affable and courteous
5. All Girl Scouts are sisters
6. A Girl Scout is a friend to nature
7. A Girl Scout is loyal to her parents, disciplined, and obeys her Leader's orders
8. A Girl Scout is always cheerful
9. A Girl Scout is thrifty and respects others' property
10. A Girl Scout is pure and noble in thought, in word and in deed

== See also ==
- Scouting in Russia
