= Piet J. Kroonenberg =

Pieter Johanus Kroonenberg
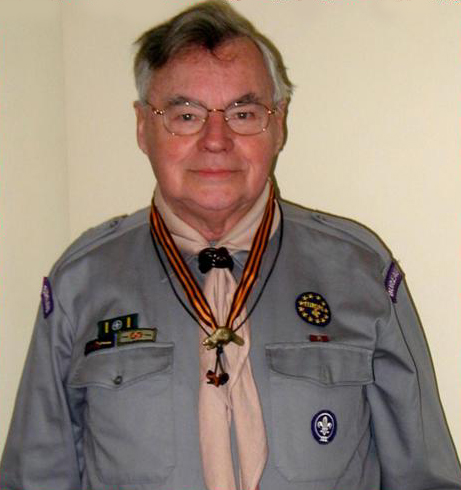
- Born: 9 May 1927; Amsterdam
- Died: 7 September 2016 (aged 89); Amsterdam
- Awards: Bronze Wolf
- Scientific career
- Fields: History
- Institutions: European Scout Committee

Piet J. Kroonenberg (9 May 1927 - 7 September 2016) was a Scouting historian and was the historical consultant to the European Scout Committee. He had written books and articles about Scouting during World War II and post-War Scouting in Central and Eastern Europe.

== Biography ==
Kroonenberg participated in the Dutch Resistance . Kroonenberg served in the Canadian Army from 1944 to 1947.

Kroonenberg was a Dutch Scoutmaster and Scouting historian. Kroonenberg had been active in Scouting since 1935 and attended the 5th World Scout Jamboree in Vogelenzang, Bloemendaal, the Netherlands, in 1937. Kroonenberg was awarded the Bronze Wolf by the World Scout Committee for exceptional services to world Scouting, in 1996, for his outstanding contributions to International Scouting. Kroonenberg was also awarded the highest Russian Union of Scouts (RUS) distinction, the Order of the Bronze Beaver.

His books The Forgotten Movements and The Undaunted, as well as numerous articles, chronicle the history of Scouting in Europe, particularly that of Scout organizations in exile.

Kroonenberg died at age 89, on 7 September 2016.

== Publications ==
=== Books ===
- Kroonenberg, Piet J. (1989). The Forgotten Movements. Geneva: World Organization of the Scout Movement.
- Kroonenberg, Piet J. (1998). The Undaunted – The Survival and Revival of Scouting in Central and Eastern Europe. Geneva: World Organization of the Scout Movement. p. 420 pages.
- Kroonenberg, Piet J. (2003). The Undaunted II – The Survival and Revival of Scouting in Eastern Europe and Southeast Asia. Geneva: World Organization of the Scout Movement. p. 94 pages.

=== Articles ===
- Kroonenberg, Piet J. (1994). From a Toad to a World Emblem – The toad, the arrowhead and the Fleur-de-Lys.
- Kroonenberg, Piet J. (December 2005). Frits Philips 26/04/1905-05/12/2005 – Frits and Scouting (in Dutch) (Obituary on Frits Philips ed.).
- Kroonenberg, Piet J. (January 2006). Sint Joris – Uit het Scouting beeld verdwenen? (in Dutch).
- Kroonenberg, Piet J. (2006). Koninklijke Scouts (in Dutch) (in five parts: Netherlands, Great Britain, Belgium ed.).
- Kroonenberg, Piet J. (April 2006). Uit het logboek van Ton Gräber; een zomer zwerftocht in 1945 (in Dutch).
