= Always prepared =

Motto of Pioneer movement

Soviet Pioneers pin featuring the motto

Always prepared (Russian: Всегда Готов [Vsegda Gotov]; literally "Always ready") is the motto of the Pioneer movement, adopted by most of the Pioneer organizations. The motto is a common feature on the organizations' badges. The motto echoes the Scout motto, "Be Prepared." After the end of the Russian Civil War, the Scout organization of the former Tsarist Russia was replaced with the Young Pioneers. The modification of the Scout's motto was suggested by the leaders of Russian Scouts who supported the Red Army and the Komsomol. The Scout motto, in use since 1907, meant that Scouts needed to be physically and mentally ready. The "always ready" of the young pioneers is mostly related to socialism, peace and country building.

The ritual involving the motto of the Young Pioneers of the Soviet Union consisted of two parts, the summons and the answer or response (1986 revision is presented below).

1. Summons - Pioneer, to fight for the cause of the Communist Party of the Soviet Union, be prepared! (Russian: Пионер, к борьбе за дело Коммунистической партии Советского Союза будь готов!).
2. Response - Always prepared! (Russian: Всегда готов!).

== Gallery ==
German slogan on the logo of the Thalmann Vanguard

Bulgarian slogan on the Dimitrov Pioneer logo

Emblem of Korean Children's Union
