= Ittihodi Scouthoi Tojikiston =

Tajik scouting organization

Scout Association of Tajikistan
- Иттиҳоди Скоутҳои Тоҷикистон
- Headquarters: P.O. 734025 Box 194
- Location: Dushanbe
- Country: Tajikistan
- Founded: 1993
- Founder: Rustam E. Karimov
- Membership: 511
- Affiliation: World Organization of the Scout Movement
- Website scouts-tj.narod2.ru

The Ittihodi Scouthoi Tojikiston (Tajik: Иттиҳоди Скоутҳои Тоҷикистон, Persian: اتحادیه اسکاوتهای تاجیکستان, Etehadih-e Eskauthai-ye Tajikâstan), the national Scouting organization of Tajikistan, was founded in 1993, and became a member of the World Organization of the Scout Movement (WOSM) on April 18, 1997. The coeducational Ittihodi Scouthoi Tojikiston has 511 members as of 2011. Tajikistan is the only one of the three Persian nations thus far whose Scouting is recognized by WOSM (see Afghanistan and Iran).

In October 2023, the organization joined the Asia Pacific Region, as the Eurasian region was dissolved.

== History ==
As far as is known, Scouting was not introduced to the region during the khanate period of the pre-Soviet era.

Scouting started in Tajikistan in 1991, by two young citizens, one a Christian and the other a Muslim, following their participation in the Congress of the Federation of Russian Scouts that met in Saint Petersburg. In spite of the civil war which broke out in May 1992, Scout troops took root in Dushanbe and in Khujand, far from the conflicts. The return to relative calm at the beginning of 1995 allowed the expansion of Scouting into the countryside through the rural school system. A Scout troop has even been created in the prison for youthful offenders in Dushanbe. Starting in April 1992, a national Scout association was gradually formed with the help of the Eurasian Region. Ittihodi Scouthoi Tojikiston was officially registered in October 1993 and is the only non-governmental youth organization which is structured and active in the country, enjoying the support of the authorities, notably the National Commission for UNESCO and several foreign development agencies represented in the country. Ittihodi Scouthoi Tojikiston's credibility is largely due to its openness to all ethnic and religious groups, and also to its efficiency and effectiveness in working under very difficult conditions with extremely limited resources.

The Scouts of Tajikistan have participated in various international Scouting events such as the World Jamboree in the Netherlands in 1995, the 1998 World Jamboree in Chile and the World Rover Moot in 1996. Several leaders have received their training abroad in France, Russia and the United States.

The Scout Association of Tajikistan has 1,904 members (as of 2004), boys and girls, in 15 towns or areas, with several groups in three zones of conflict: Garm, Shaartuz, and the high valleys of Gorno-Badakhshan, populated mainly with Ismailis.

The noun for a single Scout is Скаут in both Tajik and Russian. The membership badge of Ittihodi Scouthoi Tojikiston incorporates elements of the coat of arms as well as the flag of Tajikistan.

== Program sections ==
- Cub Scouts-7 to 11
- Scouts-12 to 15
- Rovers-16 to 20

== Pioneer movement ==
Tajikistan also has a Pioneer movement, the King Somoni Inheritance.

== See also ==
- Iran Scout Organization
- Afghanistan Scout Association

== Sources ==
Partially distilled from Eurofax 56, May, 1997. Eurofax is the monthly newsletter of the European Region of the World Organization of the Scout Movement (WOSM). It is produced by the European Scout Office and is distributed by fax to all member associations in the European Scout Region and the Europe Region WAGGGS, and others.
