= Emelin =

Emelin or Yemelin (Russian: Емелин) is a Russian masculine surname; its feminine counterpart is Emelina or Yemelina. Notable people with the surname include:

- Alexei Emelin (born 1986), Russian ice hockey player
- Aleksey Yemelin (born 1968), Soviet high jumper
- Anatoly Emelin (born 1964), Russian ice hockey player
- Andrei Emelin (born 1967), Russian scouting official
- Sergei Yemelin (born 1991), Russian ice hockey player
- Vasily Yemelin (born 1976), Russian chess player

== Other uses ==
- Emelin Theatre, in Mamaroneck, New York, U.S.
- The Spanish language equivalent of the given name Emily

== See also ==
- Emeline (disambiguation)
