= Scouting in Uzbekistan =

Scouting movement in Uzbekistan

- The membership badge of Scouting in Uzbekistan – the background is made to resemble the portal of the Ulugh Beg Madrasa in Registan Square in Samarkand, ornamented with the star of Rub El Hizb (۞), a symbol of Islam, to which a majority of Uzbeks profess.

Scouting in Uzbekistan was founded in 1995 (30 years ago), and is working toward World Organization of the Scout Movement recognition. In 1998, Scouting was limited to two Scout troops with a total of 15 members. Since the increasing presence of the United States military in the region after the September 11, 2001 attacks, Scouting is beginning to develop more thoroughly, and the fledgling organization, Kidirib Topubchi O'zbekiston, the Uzbekistan Union of Scout-Explorers, has issued insignia, considered to be a large step for nascent Scout organizations.

== History ==
As far as is known, Scouting was not introduced to the region during the khanate period of the pre-Soviet era.

On October 5, 2004, the Internet Access and Training Program (IATP) brought together 20 Scouts from Uzbekistan and Kazakhstan for a two-hour online discussion of their activities from the IATP access sites in Jizzakh, Tashkent, and Urgench, Uzbekistan, as well as in five cities in Kazakhstan, aimed to bring together representatives of the Scouting movements from these countries to promote friendship and cooperation. Nariman Shayakubov, the leader of the Scouting club at Rabati Malik (named after the ruins on the road from Samarkand to Bukhara, seen in the Uzbek Scout insignia), the Travelers Association in Tashkent, Uzbekistan, shared stories of planting trees, picking up litter in the mountainous Chimgan area north of Tashkent, and hiking. He also told of his organization's international collaboration, hosting a group of German Scouts in Uzbekistan in 2003 and making a 20-day trip to Germany funded by Bund der Pfadfinderinnen und Pfadfinder, the German Scouting organization. The Scouts of Uzbekistan told about the challenges they faced in getting Scouting off the ground in Uzbekistan, including ignorance of Scouting among the general population and resistance they faced in getting their organization registered by government agencies.

Successful Scout candidates were admitted into The Union of Scout-Explorers at an initiation ceremony held on the final Sundays in March 1999 and April 2001 in Samarkand. The partner organization "For a Healthy Generation" sponsored the ceremony, providing certificates for each newly sworn-in Scout.

Scout Camp '99 was a ten-day summer backpacking expedition in the mountainous Chimgan area north of Tashkent. Thirty five children and fifteen adults took part in this excursion, which served to foster parent-child teamwork.

The Rabat Malik Scouts have groups in Samarkand and Nukus, for Scouts between the ages of 14 and 18 only. The White Wolf Scouts are headquartered in Tashkent. There is a further group of Scouts in Samarkand, organized in Samarkand under the Yulduzlar (Stars) Youth Center, with 20 members. the Yulduzlar Scouts work from the book "What is Scouting" in Russian, published by the World Organization of Scout Movement, under the leadership of Scout group director Mastura Sharipova.

In addition, there are USA Girl Scouts Overseas in Tashkent, serviced by way of USAGSO headquarters in New York City.

The Scout Motto is Tayyor Bo'l, Be Prepared in Uzbek.

With the 1991 breakup of the Soviet Union, it was suggested that the Türkiye İzcilik Federasyonu assist in the creation of Scouting movements in the Turkic Central Asian republics of Kazakhstan, Kyrgyzstan, Turkmenistan and Uzbekistan, but it is uncertain if this plan ever materialized.

== Scouting in Karakalpakstan ==
Scouting may exist in the republic of Karakalpakstan, but at this time no information is known.

== Girl Guiding/Girl Scouting in Uzbekistan ==
In addition, Girl Guiding may be making inroads into the Central Asian nation, as in 1993 a reception was held in Manila, Philippines in conjunction with the World Association of Girl Guides and Girl Scouts' Asia Pacific Symposium of NGOs for Women in Development. The aim was to introduce or reintroduce the Girl Guiding/Girl Scouting movement and to explore possibilities of starting/restarting Girl Guiding/Girl Scouting in Uzbekistan, as well as Cambodia, Iran, Russia, Tibet and Vietnam. Fifty women leaders from those nations attended the Asia Pacific Symposium, sharing their Girl Guiding/Girl Scouting experiences.

== See also ==
- World Organization of the Scout Movement
- Organization of the Scout Movement of Kazakhstan
- Scouting in Kyrgyzstan
- Scouting in Turkmenistan

== External links and references ==
- Travelers Scouts
- White Wolf Scouts
