= Oleg Pantyukhov =

Russian scout leader (1882–1973)

Colonel Oleg Pantyukhov
- Founder of Russian Scouting
- Born: 25 March 1882; Kiev, Russian Empire (now Ukraine)
- Died: 25 October 1973 (aged 91); Nice, France
- Other names: Pantuhoff, Pantjuchow, Pantiukhov, Pantjuchow, Pantukhov, Pantuhoff
- Occupations: Imperial Russian officer, Scoutleader
- Known for: Founder of Russian Scouting

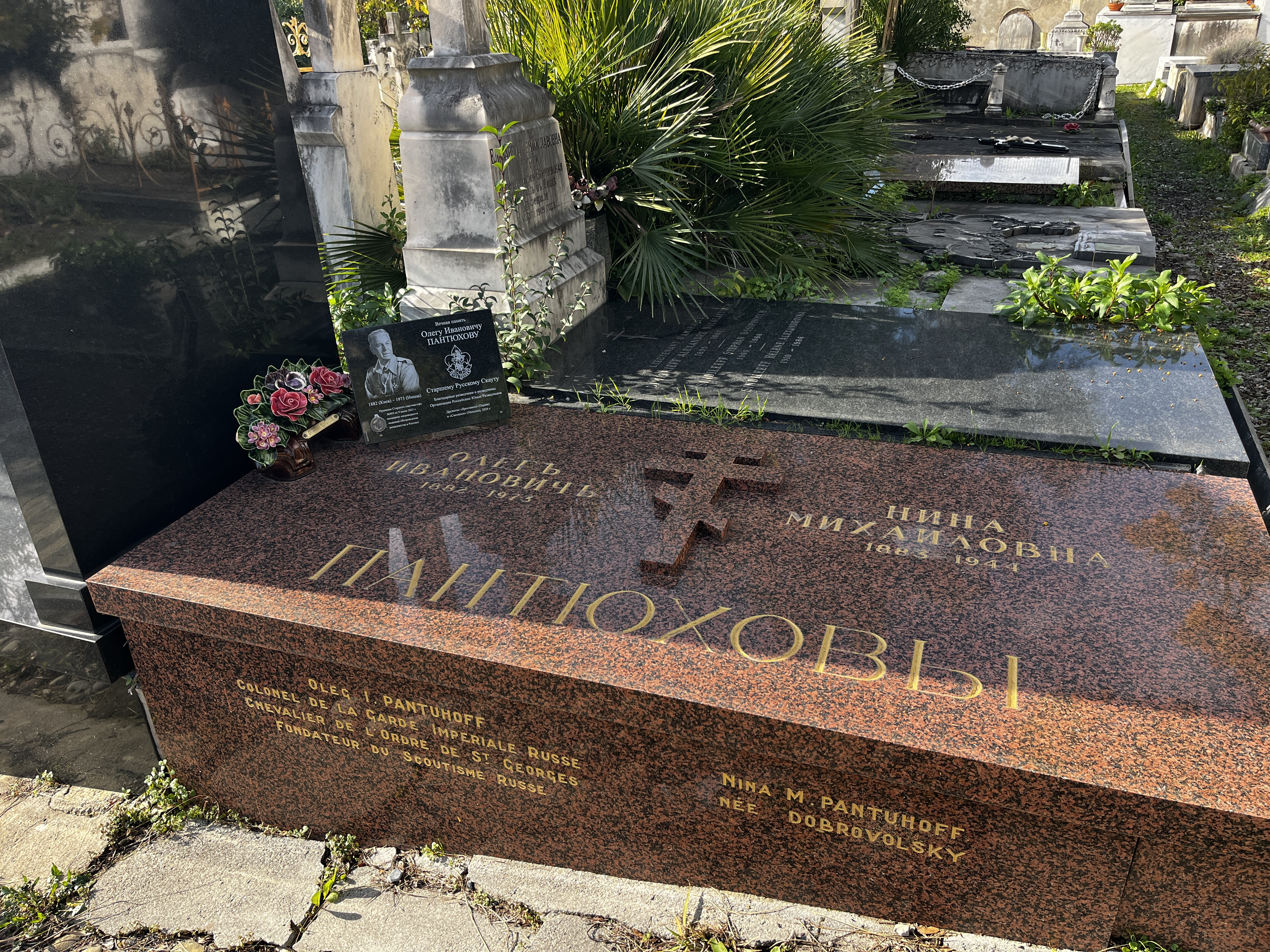
Tomb of colonel Oleg Pantuhoff in russian cemetery in Nice (06, France)

Colonel Oleg Ivanovich Pantyukhov (Russian: Олег Иванович Пантюхов; 25 March 1882 – 25 October 1973) was a Russian scout leader and officer. He was the founder of Russian Scouting.

== Early years ==
Oleg Pantyukhov was born in Kiev to a family of a military physician and an anthropologist. From 1892 to 1899, he studied at Tiflis cadet school. During his studies he became a member of the group named Pushkin club. The group was somehow similar to the modern Boy Scouts, e.g. every weekend they were having a hiking trip with camping in the mountains.

From 1899 to 1901, Pantyukhov studied in Pavlovsk Military School. After graduation he became an officer of the Leib Guard 1st infantry battalion stationed in Tsarskoye Selo. In 1908 he married Nina Mikhaylovna Dobrovolskaya, who later became one of pioneers of the Guiding movement in Russia. In 1910 their son Oleg Olegovich Pantyukhov, who served during World War II as General Eisenhower's official Russian interpreter, was born in Pavlovsk.

== Formation of Russian Scouting ==
In 1908–09, Pantyukhov became acquainted with the works of Lord Baden-Powell and decided to try these ideas on Russian soil. He organized the first Russian Scout troop Beaver (Бобр, Bobr) in Pavlovsk, a town near Tsarskoye Selo, on 30 April 1909. In the winter of 1910–11 Pantyukhov met Baden-Powell in Saint Petersburg and then visited Scout organisations in England, the Netherlands, Sweden and Denmark.

On his return, he wrote the first Russian Scouting books "Памятка Юного Разведчика" (Handbook for the Young Scout) and "В гостях у Бой-скаутов" (Visiting the Boy Scouts) (both 1912). In 1913, he wrote a book named "Спутник Бойскаута" (The Boy Scout Companion). Pantyukhov met Nicholas II and gifted a Scouting badge for Tsarevich Alexei, who formally became a Scout.

In 1914, Pantyukhov established a society called Russian Scout (Русский Скаут, Russkiy Skaut). The first Russian Scout campfire was lit in the woods of Pavlovsk Park. A Russian Scout song exists to remember this event. Scouting spread rapidly across Russia and into Siberia, and by 1916 there were about 50,000 Scouts in Russia.

During World War I, Pantyukhov received a Cross of St. George, was treated in Crimea and became the commander of the "Third Moscow School of Praporshchiks". During the October Revolution he was the leader of the cadets who unsuccessfully defended the Kremlin from Bolsheviks. In 1919 in Novocherkassk (controlled at the time by the White Army), Pantyukhov was unanimously elected the Chief Scout of Russia.

== Disbandment and banning of Russian Scouting ==
With the advent of communism after the October Revolution of 1917, and during the Russian Civil War from 1918 to 1920, most of the Scoutmasters and many Scouts fought in the ranks of the White Army and interventionists against the Red Army. In Soviet Russia the Scouting system started to be replaced by ideologically-altered Scoutlike organizations, such as "ЮК" ("Юные Коммунисты", or young communists; pronounced as yuk), that were created since 1918. There was a purge of the Scout leaders, many of whom perished under the Bolsheviks. Those Scouts who did not wish to accept the new Soviet system either left Russia for good, like Pantyukhov and others, or went underground. However, clandestine Scouting did not last long. On 19 May 1922, all of those newly created organizations were united into the Young Pioneer organization of the Soviet Union (it existed until 1990). Since that year, Scouting in the Soviet Union was banned. However, scouting returned to Russia in 2004.

== Russian Scouting in exile ==
The organization Русский Скаут then went into exile, and continued in many countries where fleeing White Russian émigrés settled, establishing groups in France, Serbia, Bulgaria, Argentina, Chile, and Paraguay. A much larger mass of Russian Scouts moved through Vladivostok to the east into Manchuria and south into China.

Pantyukhov, his wife Nina and their son Oleg Jr. went to Constantinople. There were a Russian Scout Bureau in Constantinople and Russian Scout groups were founded in Turkey. On 22 March 1921, a General Russian Scoutleaders congress took place in Constantinople under the leadership of Pantyukhov. As a result, The Council of Russian Scouts was founded as an umbrella associations for Russian Scout groups working all around the world, that most troops joined. This Scout association was recognized as a Member of the World Organization of the Scout Movement, in exile, from 1922 to 1945.

As Chief Scout of this association, which later changed its name to National Organization of Russian Scouts, served the Founder of Russian Scouting Pantyukhov. His wife Nina and later his son Oleg Jr. were also heavily involved in Russian Scouting in Exile. Oleg Pantyukhov Sr. and Nina were personal friends of Robert Baden-Powell and Olave Baden-Powell.

In 1922, Pantyukhov and his family moved to the United States, where large troops of Russian Scouts were established in such California cities as San Francisco, Burlingame, Los Angeles, etc. Pantyukhov is credited with creation of the first Russian Scout group abroad on 25 March 1920. He worked for the Scouting movement up to his death.

He took part in the 3rd World Scout Jamboree in 1929.

Oleg Pantyukhov was appointed to the Chief Scout of the Organization of Russian Young Pathfinders in November 1945, and so he was at this time the Chief Scout of both Russian Scouts-in-exile associations. He tried to unite the associations, but it failed and so he resigned as Chief Scout from ORYuR in 1957.

== Later life ==
His wife Nina died in New York on 12 January 1944.

After World War II, Pantyukhov went to Nice, France where he died in 1973.

== See also ==
- Scouting in Russia
