= Emilin =

Emilin may refer to:

- EMILIN1, protein in humans
- Emilín (footballer, born May 1912), born Emilio Alonso Larrazabal, Spanish football forward
- Emilín (footballer, born September 1912), born Emilio García Martínez, Spanish football forward
