= Organization of Russian Young Pathfinders (Scouts-in-Exile) =

Russian exile scouting organization

Организация Российских Юных Разведчиков
- national emblem
- Founded: November 14 and 15, 1945

The Organization of Russian Young Pathfinders (Russian: Организация Российских Юных Разведчиков, romanized: Organizatsiya Rossiyskikh Yunykh Razvedchikov) or ORYuR (Russian: ОРЮР), is one of the two large Russian Scouting in Exile movements. This organization has historically drawn the conservative side of the spectrum of Russians in exile.

== History ==
=== Russian Scouting in exile 1917-1945 ===
After the Russian Revolution of 1917, the organization Русский Скаут went into exile, and continued in many countries where fleeing White Russian émigrés settled, establishing groups in France, Yugoslavia, Bulgaria, Turkey, Estonia, Lithuania, Latvia, Finland, Poland, Romania, Hungary, Belgium, Argentina, Chile, Canada, Australia, United Kingdom, United States and, for a short time also, in the Netherlands and Surinam. A much larger mass of Russian Scouts moved through Vladivostok to the east into Manchuria and south into China and Hong Kong.

The most important leader of Russian Scouting in exile was Oleg Pantyukhov. Oleg Pantyukhov, Chief Scout of Russia, first went to Turkey and resided later in France and then moved to the United States, where large troops of Russian Scouts were established in cities such as San Francisco, Burlingame and Los Angeles. He returned to Nice, France, where he died. He was Chief Scout of N.O.R.S. until his death on October 25, 1973, and was involved in Russian Scouting from 1908/1909.

The National Organization of Russian Scouts was recognized as a Member of the World Organization of the Scout Movement, in exile, from 1922 to 1945. The Headquarters was first in Constantinople, later in Brussels and Belgrade.

=== DP-Scouts and the founding of ORYuR ===
After World War II Russian Scout and Guide troops were founded in Displaced Persons camps in i.e. in Austria and West Germany. In Monchehof Displaced Persons Camp the Russian Scouts provided postal delivery and issued Scout stamps. So from November 14 to November 15, 1945, a Conference of Russian DP-Scout leaders took place in Munich and the Organization of Russian Young Pathfinders (ORYuR) was founded. Among the founders were Boris Borisovitsch Martino. Oleg Pantyukhov was appointed to the Chief Scout of the Organization of Russian Young Pathfinders, and so he was at this time the Chief Scout of both Russian Scouts-in-exile associations. He tried to unite the associations, but it failed, and so he resigned as Chief Scout from ORYuR in 1957. As neither organization was created ex nihilo, they may both be considered legitimate successors to the Русский Скаут heritage.

ORYuR became a member of the Displaced Persons Scout Division from 1947 to 1950.

=== ORYuR today ===
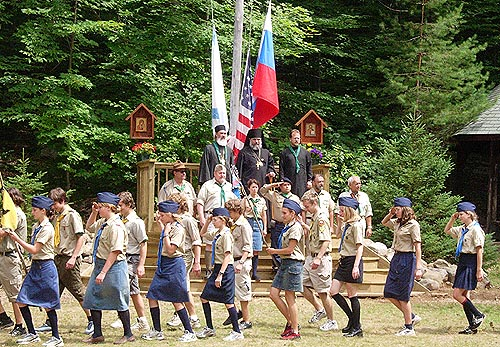
A parade at the 2004 jamboree

There are groups of this Scout association in Germany, Argentina, the United States and other countries in Europe, the Americas and Australia.

In Germany, the name "Russische St. Georgs-Pfadfinder" (Russian St. George's Scouts) is sometimes used.

In the United States, it is known as "St. George's Pathfinders of America."

Together with N.O.R.S. ORYuR helped to restart Scouting in Russia and other parts of the former USSR so there are today groups of ORYuR in Russia and Lithuania.

== See also ==
- Scouting in Russia
- National Organization of Russian Scouts (Scouts-in-Exile) (НОРС)
- National Association of Russian Explorers (НОРР)
- Orthodox Organization of Russian Pathfinders (ПОРР)
