= Irina Pruidze =

Georgian politician (born 1976)

- ირინა ფრუიძე
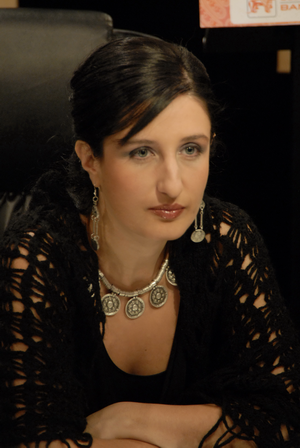

Secretary General of the Georgian Organization of the Scout Movement

Irina Pruidze (Georgian: ირინა ფრუიძე, born 1976 in Tbilisi, Georgia) is Secretary General of the Georgian Organization of the Scout Movement and the former Regional Chair of the Eurasia Regional Scout Committee of the World Organization of the Scout Movement (WOSM).

== Background ==
Pruidze is the daughter of physicist Vazha Pruidze and chemist Aida Dzvelaia. She studied medicine at Tbilisi State Medical University and psychology at Tbilisi Institute of Anthropology and Political Science. She worked at Youth of the European People's Party and the European Youth Forum. She is a PhD student in the Psychology Faculty of Ivane Javakhishvili Tbilisi State University (Program of Organization Development and Consultancy), a member of Georgian "Game TV", and is interested in youth policy, politics, international organizations, healthcare and non-formal education. Her husband is theater and film actor and radio journalist David Velijanashvili, and they have a daughter, Salome Velijanashvili.

On 5 October 2015 President Giorgi Margvelashvili of Georgia met with an official delegation from WOSM, led by Scott A. Teare. The delegation included Pruidze, Iurie Emilian, Regional Director of the World Scout Bureau Eurasia Support Center, Giorgi Khvinteliani, President of the GOSM, and Tinatin Koyava, Secretary General of the GOSM.

During the 3rd Europe-Eurasia Leadership Training and Partnership Meeting held in Tbilisi, Georgia, from 13 to 16 May 2016, Pruidze and Andrea Demarmels, Chair of the European Regional Scout Committee signed the new Partnership Agreement between the two neighboring regions.

== See also ==
- Sakartvelos Skauturi Modzraobis Organizatsia
