= Federation of Scouts of Russia =

Scouting organization in Russia

The Federation of Scouts of Russia, or FSR (Russian: Федерации Скаутов России; Federatsiya Skautov Rossii, or ФСР), was one of several national Scouting organizations formed in the Russian Federation following independence from the Soviet Union.

FSR logo with Scouting motto "Be Prepared" ("Bud Gotov")

== History ==
The federation was formed on November 27, 1991. It comprised three regional Scouting organizations that had grown out of the independent Association for the Revival of Russian Scouting (AVoRS): the Scout Association of St. Petersburg, The Union of Scouts of Moscow, and the Siberian Association of Scouts. The federation's president was Arkady Nikitchenko.

In August 1994 the FSR held the First International Russian Jamboree at Lake Ladoga in northwest Russia near St. Petersburg. Over 3,500 Scouts from around the world were in attendance. A Second International Jamboree that took place north of Moscow in 1997 with approximately 4,000 participants was organized by FSR in conjunction with the Organization of Russian Young Pathfinders (ORYuR).

On April 29, 1998, the FSR joined with ORYuR, along with the St. Vladimir Scouts, to form a new group called the National Organization of Russian Scouts – Pathfinder (NORS-R, or simply NORS). Their aim was to become accepted as the representative of the World Organization of the Scout Movement (WOSM) in Russia. However, the WOSM rejected NORS's constitution as "undemocratic" and favored a rival organization, the All Russia National Scout Organization (ARNSO) — a group that had formed the day after NORS, joining such groups as the Federation of Orthodox Scouts (FOS), the Russian Union of Scouts (RUS), and several local Scouting organizations.
