= Scouts of Northern Cyprus =

Kuzey Kıbrıs Türk İzcileri
- Alternate badge of the Kuzey Kıbrıs Türk İzcileri, modified to be politically neutral
- Website "www.scoutsofnortherncyprus.org". Archived from the original on 2007-09-28.

The Northern Cyprus Turkish Scouts (Turkish: Kuzey Kıbrıs Türk İzcileri) is a Scouting federation active in the de facto independent Turkish Republic of Northern Cyprus.
