= National Organization of Russian Scouts (Scouts-in-Exile) =

Национальная Организация Русских Скаутов

The National Organization of Russian Scouts (NORS; Russian: Национальная Организация Русских Скаутов, НОРС, alternately Национальная организация Российских скаутов) is one of the two large Russian Scouting in Exile movements. This organization has historically drawn the liberal side of the spectrum of Russians in exile. In 2009 NORS celebrated the centenary Jubilee of Russian Scouting.

== History ==
After the Russian Revolution of 1917, the organization Русский Скаут went into exile, and continued in many countries where fleeing White Russian émigrés settled, establishing groups in France, Yugoslavia, Bulgaria, Turkey, Estonia, Lithuania, Latvia, Finland, Poland, Romania, Hungary, Belgium, Argentina, Chile, Canada, Australia, United States and for a short time also in the Netherlands and Suriname. A much larger mass of Russian Scouts moved through Vladivostok to the east into Manchuria and south into China and Hong Kong.

In 1920, the first Russian Scouts troops were founded and Turkey and a Russian Scout Bureau was opened at Constantinople in July 1920 Important leaders at that time included Colonel Oleg Pantyukhov, who was the founder of Scouting in Russia and became Chief Scout of the Russian Scouts in exile. On March 22, 1921, a General Russian Scoutleaders congress took place and The Council of Russian Scouts was founded as an umbrella associations for Russian Scout groups working all around the world, that most troops joined. Other names used at this time were Organisation of Russian Scouts Beyond The Borders and L´Association Nationale des Scouts Russes.

In 1926, the now traditional and still used Russian Scout and Guide badges were introduced: For the Scouts the Fleur-de-lis with Saint George and for the girls the three Snow-Drops.

In the years 1929 and 1930 The Council of Russian Scouts changed their name to the National Organization of Russian Scouts and established a National Headquarters in Brussels. The National Headquarters later moved to Belgrade.

Russian Scouting, as the Association Nationale des Scouts Russes was recognized as a member of the World Organization of the Scout Movement, in exile, from 1922 to 1945.

During this time the Russian Scouts were active members of the World brotherhood and took part in many international meetings and camps. I.e. they took part in the World Jamborees in 1924, 1929, 1933 and 1937.

In this years the National Organization of Russian Pathfinders (NORR) was founded by Scoutmaster Pavel Nikolayevich Bogdanovich, veteran of the Russian Imperial army, as a breakaway organization from the National Organization of Russian Scouts. The National Organisation of Russian Pathfinders was a nationalistic and very anti-Communist and joined in 1936 the National Alliance of Russian Solidarists, an émigré Russian political movement.

During World War II, activities of the National Organization of Russian Scouts (NORS) were banned in German-occupied countries such as Poland, Latvia and Yugoslavia. The members of NORS continued Scouting in the underground and groups in countries such as Australia carried on their normal activities. But the other Russian Scouts-in-exile association NORR was still active in the German-occupied countries and encouraged to join the Russian Liberation Army. Some NORS groups joined the NORR, but other Russian émigré Scouts joined the French Resistance. The National Organization of Russian Explorers (NORR) remains active as its own unaffiliated organization in the United States after World War II.

After World War II, Russian Scout and Guide troops were founded in Displaced Persons camps in Austria and West Germany. In Monchehof Displaced Persons Camp, the Russian Scouts provided postal delivery and issued Scout stamps. So from November 14 to November 15, 1945, a Conference of Russian DP-Scout leaders took place in Munich and the Organization of Russian Young Pathfinders (ORYuR) was founded. Oleg Pantyukhov was appointed Chief Scout of the Organization of Russian Young Pathfinders and so he was at this time the Chief Scout of both Russian Scouts-in-exile associations. He tried to unite the associations, but it failed and so he resigned as Chief Scout from ORYuR in 1957. As neither organization was created ex nihilo, they may both be considered legitimate successors to the Русский Скаут heritage.

The one, NORS, was expelled from the World Organization of the Scout Movement. and the other, ORYuR, became a member of the Displaced Persons Scout Division from 1947 to 1950. But the Russians were still brother Scouts and so the took part in the 7th World Scout Jamboree, JIM, an international Scouting event to celebrate the 50th birthday of Scouting, and the 10th World Scout Jamboree in 1959.

NORS issued stamps to commemorate their Chief Scout and founder of Russian Scouting Oleg Pantyukhov and Russian Scouting.

Oleg Pantyukhov, Chief Scout of Russia, first went to Turkey and resided later in the United States and then moved to France, where large troops of Russian Scouts were established in cities such as San Francisco, Burlingame, California, Los Angeles, etc. He returned to Nice, France where he died. He served as Chief Scout of NORS until his death on October 25, 1973, and was involved in Russian Scouting since 1908/1909.

Some children of Soviet Russian diplomats were members of NORS or the Boy Scouts of the United Nations during Cold War.

NORS and ORYuR helped to restart Scouting in Russia, Ukraine and Belarus since 1991. NORS was active in Moscow, St. Petersburg, Ukraine and Belarus.

membership badge of NORS, now returned to Russia

Artyom Laletin is the Head of the National Organization of Russian Scouts Australia Group. The current world head of NORS Snr.Scm. Michael Shahmatov Australia

== See also ==
- Scouting in Russia
- Orthodox Organization of Russian Pathfinders (ПОРР)
