= Scouting in Turkmenistan =

There is no formal Scouting organization yet in Turkmenistan, due to the political situation and because Turkmenistan refuses to join any organization because of its "status of permanent neutrality," which was accepted by the United Nations General Assembly on December 12, 1995.

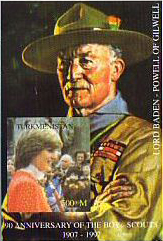
Turkmen postage stamps with Scout motifs, juxtaposing Baden-Powell and Princess Diana

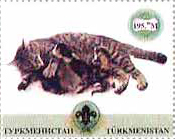
Turkmen Scout postage stamp, note fleur-de-lis at bottom center

== See also ==
- World Organization of the Scout Movement
- Organization of the Scout Movement of Kazakhstan
- Scouting in Kyrgyzstan
- Scout Association of Uzbekistan
