= All-Russian Scout Association =

Russian youth organization

- Russian: Всероссийская скаутская ассоциация Vserossiyskaya skautskaya assotsiatsiya
- Headquarters: Moscow
- Country: Russia
- Founded: 30 January 2004
- Membership: 15,000 (2018)
- Chief Scout: Andrey Yemelin
- Affiliation: World Organization of the Scout Movement
- Website www.russianscout.ru

The All-Russian Scout Association (ARSA; Russian: Всероссийская скаутская ассоциация, romanized: Vserossiyskaya skautskaya assotsiatsiya) is a Scouting and public youth organization in Russia. ARSA is the recognized member of the World Organization of the Scout Movement for Russia as part of the Eurasian Scout Region, joining the Asia-Pacific Scout Region in October 2023, as the Eurasian Scout Region was dissolved. ARSA represents Russia internationally in Scouting and has an estimated membership of 15,000 (2018).

ARSA was founded in 2004 as the Russian Association of Scouts/Navigators (RAS/N; Росси́йская Ассоциа́ция Навига́торов/Ска́утов) as an umbrella organization for dozens of Scout organizations and adopted its current name in 2014. The unification occurred 25 years after the establishment of the Revival of Russian Scouting Association in 1990, and announced as a "big step in the unification of the Scout movement" in Russia. ARSA is a member of the National Council of Youth Organizations of the Russian Federation and an active participant in a number of programs and projects of the Committee on Youth Affairs.

== History ==
ARSA originated from the reform of the Russian Association of Scouts/Navigators founded in 2004 and included the following organizations:

- All-Russian National Scout Organization (ARNSO)
- Brotherhood of Orthodox Pathfinders (BPS)
- Federation of Scouts of Russia (SDF)
- National Organization of the Scout Movement of Russia (NOSDR)
- Part of the Russian Scout Organization

Negotiations are currently being held on accession of the Russian Union of Scouts (RCC). ARSA maintains relations with other Scout organizations in Russia, such as National Organization of Russian Scouts, Organization of Russian Young Pathfinders, and the Russian Association of Girl Scouts.

Since 2014, ARSA has been recognized by the World Organization of the Scout Movement as its member organization for Russia, and belongs to the Eurasian Scout Region. ARSA represents Russian Scouting internationally and maintains relationships with a number of countries, among them Germany, Poland, United Kingdom, Japan, Finland, Norway, Sweden.

== Organization ==
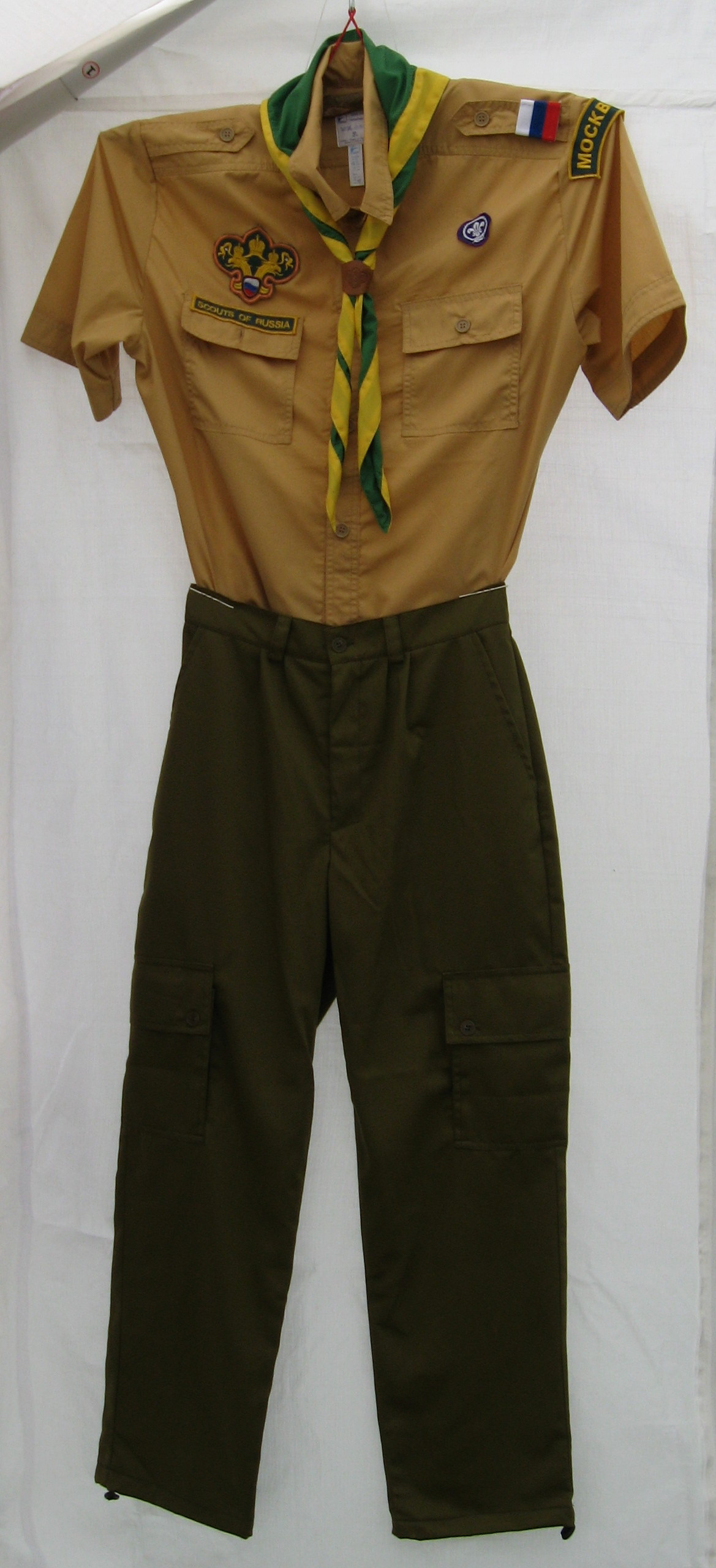
Uniform of the Russian Association of Scouts/Navigators

In Russia, the ARSA is represented in more than half of the subjects of the Russian Federation. The most active work is carried out in the regions Vladivostok, Omsk, Rostov-on-Don, Moscow and Moscow Oblast, Voronezh, Yaroslavl, Saint Petersburg, and Kaliningrad. Membership stands at about 15,000 people as of 2018.

Regional activities are normally conducted by regional sub-associations, among them are:

- Voronezh Regional Social Children's Organization of Scouts (VRODOS; Воронежская Региональная Общественная Детская Организация Скаутов); 200 members;
- Irkutsk Provincial Public Organization of Children and Young People "Baikal Scout" (IOOODiM; Иркутская Областная Общественная Организация Детей и Молодежи "Байкальский Скаут"); 2,000 members
- Public Children's and Youth Organization "Scouts of Nakhodka" (ODMOSN; Общественная детская, молодежная организация "Скауты Находки"); 100 members
- Rostov Association of Scouts/Navigators (Ростовской Ассоциации навигаторов-скаутов); unknown membership;
- Michurinsk Organization of Scouts/Navigators (MOS/N; Мичуринская организация навигаторов/скаутов); unknown membership;
