= Scouting in Russia =

Scouting in Russia comprises several dozen Scout associations, based on religion, politics and geography.

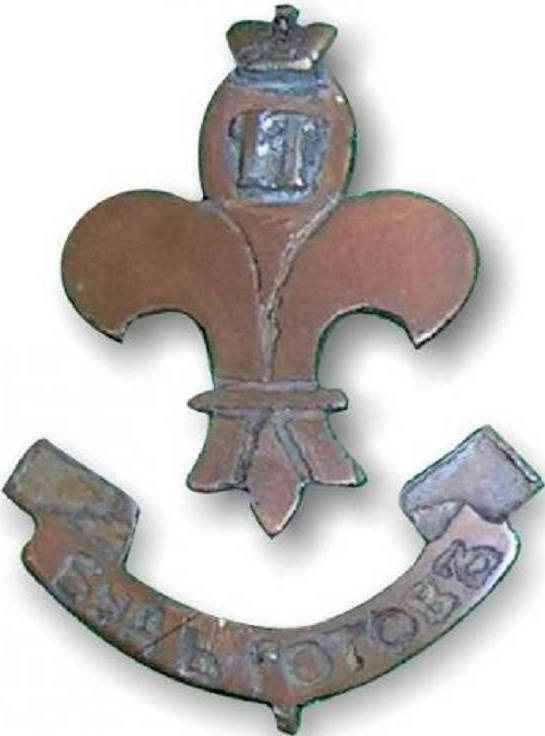
The original Boy Scout of the Russian Empire badge, dated circa 1915

The traditional Russian membership badge, still used by several organizations, features Saint George slaying a dragon.

== History ==
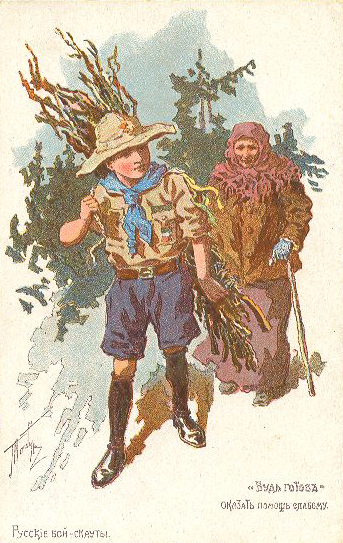
early postcard of Scouting in Russia

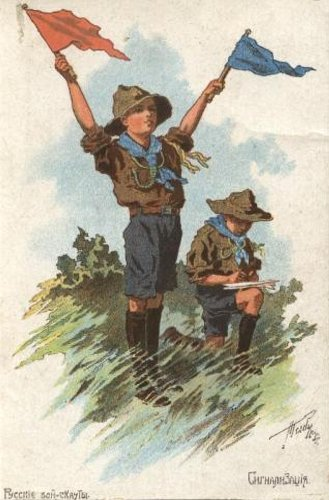
Russian Boy Scouts Signaling. Postcard, 1915

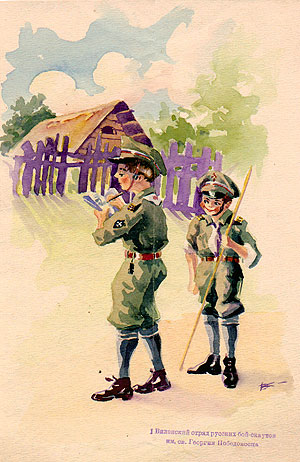
Russian Boy Scouts Postcard, 1914-1917

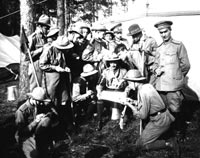
Russian Boy Scout camp. Before 1917

=== 1908 to 1922 ===
In 1908, Baden-Powell's book Scouting for Boys came out in Russia by the order of Tsar Nicholas II. It was called Young Scout (Юный Разведчик, Yuny Razvedchik). On 30 April [O.S. 17 April] 1909, a young officer, Colonel Oleg Pantyukhov, organized the first Russian Scout troop Beaver (Бобр, Bobr) in Pavlovsk, a town near Tsarskoye Selo, St. Petersburg region. From 30 December 1910, Baden-Powell was in Russia for a week or more, and visited Nicholas II in Tsarskoye Selo; they had a very pleasant conversation, as the Tsar remembered it. In 1914, Pantyukhov established a society called Russian Scout (Русский Скаут, Russkiy Skaut). The first Russian Scout campfire was lit in the woods of Pavlovsk Park in Tsarskoye Selo. A Russian Scout song exists to remember this event. Scouting spread rapidly across Russia and into Siberia, and by 1916, there were about 50,000 Scouts in Russia. Nicholas' son Tsarevich Aleksei was a Scout himself.

With the advent of communism after the October Revolution of 1917, and during the Russian Civil War from 1917 to 1922, most of the Scoutmasters and many Scouts fought in the ranks of the White Army and interventionists against the Red Army.

In Soviet Russia the Scouting system started to be replaced by ideologically-altered Scout like organizations, such as "ЮК" ("Юные Коммунисты", or young communists; pronounced as yuk), that were created since 1918. There was a purge of the Scout leaders, many of whom perished under the Bolsheviks. Those Scouts who did not wish to accept the new Soviet system either left Russia for good, like Pantyukhov and others, or went underground. However, clandestine Scouting did not last long. On May 19, 1922 all of those newly created organizations were united into the Young Pioneer organization of the Soviet Union, which existed until 1990. From that date, Scouting in the USSR was banned.

However, some features of Scouting remained in the modified form. The Scout motto "Bud' Gotov" ("Be Prepared") was modified into the Pioneer motto "Vsegda Gotov" ("Always Prepared"). Mention of God was removed, replaced by Lenin and the Communist Party of the Soviet Union. There were no separate organizations for girls and boys, and many new features were introduced, like Young Pioneer Palaces.

=== In exile ===
The organization then went into exile, and continued in many countries where fleeing White Russian émigrés settled, establishing groups in France, Serbia, Bulgaria, Argentina, Chile, and Paraguay. A much larger mass of thousands of Russian Scouts moved through Vladivostok to the east into Manchuria and south into China.

Colonel Pantyukhov, Chief Scout of Russia, first resided in France and then moved to the United States, where large troops of Russian Scouts were established in cities such as San Francisco, Burlingame, California, and Los Angeles. He returned to Nice, France where he died.

Russian Scouting was recognized as a member of the World Organization of the Scout Movement, in exile, from 1928 to 1945.

Russian Scouting eventually split into two organizations over ideological differences. These are the modern-day National Organization of Russian Scouts (NORS) and Organization of Russian Young Pathfinders (ORYuR/ОРЮР). As neither organization was created ex nihilo, they may both be considered legitimate successors to the Русский Скаут heritage.

=== After 1990 ===
The Scout movement began to reemerge and was reborn within Russia in 1990, when relaxation of government restrictions allowed youth organizations to be formed to fill the void left by the Pioneers, with various factions competing for recognition. Some former Pioneer leaders have also formed Scout groups, and there is some controversy as to their motivations in doing so.

The World Organization of the Scout Movement asked the Scout Association of the United Kingdom to assist the Scout Organizations in the Moscow and Saint Petersburg regions. Other national Scout organizations are involved in helping other regions; the Boy Scouts of America are involved in the regions to the east of the Urals, for instance.

As with many European nations, several Scout associations were actively supporting the growth of Scouting in Russia, and served Scouts with regards to persuasion of faith, national orientation and geography.

At the end of the 1990s, several of the associations formed the All-Russian National Scouting Organisation (ARNSO) (Всероссийская Национальная Скаутская Организация (ВНСО), Vserossiyskaya Natsionalnaya Skautskaya Organizatsiya (VNSO)), guided by WOSM. In 2000, it became a member of WOSM.

14 Russian Scouts were invited to take part in the 19th World Scout Jamboree in 1999. Russia was represented 2003 at the 20th World Scout Jamboree in Thailand. 504 Scouts from the association Russian Association of Scouts/Navigators took part in the 21st World Scout Jamboree in 2007.

The membership was transferred in 2004 to the RAS/N, following the disintegration of ARNSO. RAS/N is also an umbrella federation of different associations, some of them former members of ARNSO.

== Scouting organizations in Russia ==
Russia is served by at least ten different nationwide Scouting organizations and about 30 regional and local associations. Most of the nationwide organizations consist of both regional associations and directly served units - in some cases even in the same cities.

The given membership numbers of the organizations are quite rough and in some cases inconsistent since no annual census is conducted.

=== Nationwide organizations ===
The ten organizations with a national scale are:

- Russian Union of Scouts (RUS; Русский Союз Скаутов); member of World Federation of Independent Scouts, 1,500 members
- Brotherhood (Federation) of Orthodox Scouts (BPS; Братство (Федерация) Православных Следопытов (скаутов)); 2,000 members
- National Organization of Russian Scouts (NORS-R; Национальная Организация Российских Скаутов-Разведчиков); 2,000 direct members; including
  - Organization of Russian Young Pathfinders (ORYuR; Организация Российских Юных Разведчиков); observer to the UIGSE; 2,200 members
  - Russian Association of Girl Scouts (RADS; Российская Ассоциация Девочек-Скаутов); member of the World Association of Girl Guides and Girl Scouts; 1,100 members
- Russian Association of Scouts/Navigators (RAS/N; Российская Ассоциация Навигаторов-скаутов); actual member of WOSM; 14,000 members; reformed, the organization makes up the bulk of the All-Russian Scout Association.
- Russian Scout Organization (RSO; Российская Скаутская Организация); 27,000 members
- National Organization of Volunteers "Russia" (NORD "Russia"; Национальная Организация Добровольцев "Русь"); 500 members

=== Regional and interregional members of the nationwide organizations ===
==== All-Russian National Scouting Organisation ====
- Brotherhood (Federation) of Orthodox Scouts (BPS; Братство (Федерация) Православных Следопытов (скаутов)); 2,000 members
- Interregional Children's Public Organization "Association of Scouts" (MDOOAS; Межрегиональная Детская Общественная Организация "Ассоциация Скаутов"); 200 members
- Union "Moscow's Scout" (SMS; Союз "Московский Скаут"); 100 members;
- League of YMCA-Scouts of Saint Petersburg (LSSP; Лига скаутов YMCA Санкт-Петербурга); 400 members

==== National Organization of Russian Scouts ====
The Suvorov Scout, the highest rank of the Siberian Association of Scouts.

- Organization of Russian Young Pathfinders (ORYuR; Организация Российских Юных Разведчиков); 2,200 members
  - Regional Scouting Organization "Republic Alarm" (RSORN; Региональная скаутская организация "Республика Набат"); 100 members;
- Russian Association of Girl Scouts (RADS; Российская Ассоциация Девочек-Скаутов); 1,100 members
  - Volgograd Association of Girl Scouts (VADS; Волгоградская Ассоциация девочек-скаутов) 380 members
- Scouts of Karelia (КРДОО Скауты Карелии); 300 members;
- Kaliningrad Regional Public Children's and Youth Organization of Scouts "Amber Island" (KRDMOOS; Калининградская Региональная Детско-молодежная Общественная Организация Скаутов "Янтарный Остров"); 300 members
- Regional Children's Public Organization "Scouts of Moscow" (RDOOSM; Региональная Детская Общественная Организация «Скауты Москвы»); was: Saint Vladimir Union of Russian Scouts; 300 members; ,
- Siberian Association of Scouts (SibAS; Сибирская Ассоциация Скаутов); membership unknown; perhaps disintegrated
  - Omsk Provincial Scouting Center "Siberia" (OOSTS; Омский Областной Скаутский Центр "Сибирь"); 200 members
- Arkhangelsk Regional Children's Public Organization of Scouts (ARDOOS; Aрхангельская Региональная Детская Общественная Организация Скаутов); 100 members
- Volgograd Provincial organization of scouts (VOOS; Волгоградская Областная Организация скаутов); 300 members
- Organization of Scouts of Tatarstan (OST; Организация скаутов Татарстана); 200 members
- Permian Provincial Scouting Center (POSTS; Пермский Областной Скаутский Центр); 330 members
- Saratov Provincial Organization of Scouts (SOOS; Саратовская Областная Организация скаутов); 300 members
- Association of the Scouts of Saint Petersburg (ASP; Ассоциация Скаутов Санкт-Петербурга); 300 members
- Novgorod Provincial Public Children's Organization of Scouts (NODOOS; Новгородская Областная Детская Общественная Организация Скаутов); 300 members;
- Borovichi Public Children's Organization of Scouts "Spring" (BDOOS; Боровичская детская общественная организация скаутов «Родник»); 100 members

NORS-R is active in Karelia, St. Petersburg, Murmansk Oblast, Volgograd Oblast, Archangelsk Oblast, Togliatti, Novgorod Oblast, Kaliningrad Oblast, Moscow, Perm, Sverdlovsk Oblast, Ivanovo Oblast, Voronesh, Bashkortostan and Saratov.

==== Russian Association of Scouts/Navigators ====
- Voronezh Regional Social Children's Organization of Scouts (VRODOS; Воронежская Региональная Общественная Детская Организация Скаутов); 200 members;
- Irkutsk Provincial Public Organization of Children and Young People "Baikal Scout" (IOOODiM; Иркутская Областная Общественная Организация Детей и Молодежи "Байкальский Скаут"); 2,000 members
- Public Children's and Youth Organization "Scouts of Findings" (ODMOSN; Общественная детская, молодежная организация "Скауты Находки"); 100 members
- Rostov Association of Scouts/Navigators (Ростовской Ассоциации навигаторов-скаутов); unknown membership;
- Michurinsk Organization of Scouts/Navigators (MOS/N; Мичуринская организация навигаторов/скаутов); unknown membership;

RAS/N is active in Amur, Astrakhan, Bryansk, Chelyabinsk, Irkutsk, Kaliningrad, Kaluga, Kirov, Kostroma, Lipetsk, Magadan (which has a relationship with the Western Alaska Council of the Boy Scouts of America), Moscow, Murmansk, Nizhny Novgorod, Rostov, Tambov, Vladimir, Voronezh, and Yaroslavl Oblasts, and in Altai and Primorsky Krais. A Eurasia Foundation grant was awarded in July 1998 to the North Eastern Scout Council of Magadan Oblast "Podvig" to develop youth organizations in Magadan Oblast.

==== Russian Scout Organization ====
- Association of the Scouts of the Moscow Oblast (ASMO; Ассоциация Скаутов Московской Области); 400 members
- Association of the Scouts of the Penza Oblast (ASPO; Ассоциация Скаутов Пензенской области); 1,300 members

=== Scouting in ethnic subdivisions of Russia ===
Scouting is becoming familiar in non-Russian parts of the federation, and is being developed in several ethnic republics and subdivisions. Those where growth is documented are marked after the republic name.

- Republic of Adygea
- Altai Republic
- Republic of Bashkortostan (intermediate growth-Association of the United Scouts of the Republic of Bashkortostan (AOSRB; Ассоциация Объединённых Скаутов Республики Башкирии); 300 members)
- Buryat Republic (intermediate growth)
- Chechen Republic
- Chuvash Republic (Union of Scouts of Chuvashia)
- Republic of Dagestan
- Republic of Ingushetia
- Kabardino-Balkar Republic
- Republic of Karelia - Скауты Карелии/Scouts of Karelia.
- Republic of Khakassia (intermediate growth)
- Komi Republic (Association of Scouts of Komi, known to have its own local Scouts by 1992)
- Republic of Kalmykia
- Republic of Karachay–Cherkessia
- Mari El Republic (intermediate growth)
- Republic of Mordovia
- Republic of North Ossetia–Alania
- Sakha Republic
- Republic of Tatarstan
- Tuva Republic
- Udmurt Republic (Scout Association of the Udmurt Republic (SAUR; Скаутская Ассоциация Удмуртской республики); 1,000 members;)
- Khanty–Mansi Autonomous Okrug

==== Others ====
The affiliation of the following associations is unknown, or they are independent regional bodies:

  - Izhevsk Scout Organization (ISO; Ижевская скаутская организация); 200 members
  - Yegoryevsk Scout Organization (Егорьевская скаутская организация)

== Ideals, program, and awards ==
The Scout Motto is Будь готов (Bud' Gotov, Be Prepared in Russian. The Russian noun for a single Scout is Скаут, but can alternately be Разведчик or Навигатор depending on the organization. As Разведчик also carries the connotation of spy, now often perceived as negative in the post-Soviet period, many now refer to themselves as Скаут or Навигатор, the more neutral term for the original meaning, an advance party sent to reconnoiter the terrain, similar to pathfinder or explorer.

The highest Russian Scout distinction is known as the Order of the Bronze Beaver.

== International Scouting units in Russia ==
In addition, there are USA Girl Scouts Overseas in Moscow, serviced by way of USAGSO headquarters in New York City; as well as Cub Scout Pack 3950 and Boy Scout Troop 500, both of Moscow, linked to the Direct Service branch of the Boy Scouts of America, which supports units around the world. There are also British Girl Guides served by British Guides in Foreign Countries in Sakhalin.

== Network Russia Scout Fellowship ==
Network Russia Scout Fellowship badge in Russian

Early in 1991, the Scout Association and the Boy Scouts of America were asked to assist the World Bureau to encourage the development of Russian Scouting, with the UK assisting in European Russia, and the BSA assisting in Siberia. In 1991 an experimental camp was held in Odesa, Ukraine by UK Scouts. In 1992, an international training course for 17 Russian leaders was held at the International Office at Gilwell Park and a study visit to Moscow and Saint Petersburg to establish direct links between British and Russian groups later in the year.

The UK support network became the Network Russia Scout Fellowship in March 2000. No longer supports Scout relationships with Russia, due to diminishing support and lack of interest.

== See also ==
- Scouting in displaced persons camps
