= Internet Access and Training Program =

The Internet Access and Training Program (IATP) funded by USAID since 2007, is a program of the Bureau of Educational and Cultural Affairs (ECA), US Department of State, funded in the past under the Freedom Support Act (FSA). IATP was administered by Project Harmony in Russia and still is administered by the International Research & Exchanges Board (IREX) in other Eurasian countries. IATP promotes Internet training and provides Internet access in developing countries around the world.

== Overview ==
IATP consists of a network of Internet access sites located throughout 11 countries of Eurasia. Through these sites, thousands of individuals per month receive free-of-charge access to the Internet as well as to a wide variety of computer-related training programs. IATP access sites are located in the countries of Armenia, Azerbaijan, Belarus, Georgia, Kazakhstan, Kyrgyzstan, Moldova, Tajikistan, Turkmenistan, Ukraine, and Uzbekistan.

IATP began in the mid 1990s. At that time, the program was aimed at providing Internet access and training exclusively to scholars from Eurasia who had participated in US government-sponsored exchange programs. Through its services, IATP helped these exchange program alumni stay in contact with the professional colleagues they had made while in the United States, assisting them in the process of continuing their research and academic growth once back home. Over time, IATP gradually began to provide Internet access and training to other non-alumni groups such as journalists, lawyers, NGO representatives, and students. Providing the services of the program to new audiences has continued to this day. Today, IATP provides its services to the public at large in the countries in which it works.

Almost all IATP access sites are housed within local partner institutions. These institutions typically include public libraries, universities, and NGOs. An IATP access site usually occupies one room in the partner institution’s premises. This room houses all IATP equipment, computer-related books and manuals, and an IREX staff member who oversees the operations of the access site. In a limited number of cases, IATP sites are part of the larger IREX office in a given country.

IATP began operating in Moldova in 1998. At present, there is one core IATP access site and there are seven independent Internet centers. In July 2006, 333 residents of Moldova visited the IATP training laboratory, and 63 people attended training courses. IATP's server in Moldova hosts 244 non-commercial websites.

IATP undertakes four primary activities—provided free of charge—through its network of sites: Internet Access. Users can reserve time in increments of one hour to access e-mail and the Internet, or use the computers for other purposes such as word processing.

== Training ==
Members of the public can enroll in a wide variety of training courses on information technology. These include basic courses in computer literacy to higher-end training on subjects such as Web programming and network administration.

== Online chats ==
Chats have evolved into a valuable medium for exchanging unrestricted information about events across borders, offering an alternative perspective to other types of media. Governmental officials from many countries have been the guests of honor in IATP-hosted Web chats, including numerous members of parliament and US Embassy officials. For example, nationwide chats held in Ukraine in December 2005 gave librarians the opportunity to lobby the Ministry of Culture for simplification of the regulations regarding procurement. This lobbying effort was successful, and is being studied among librarians in other countries across Eurasia through additional online chats.

A series of chats hosted by the IATP network in Eurasia in November 2005 with representatives of Ministries of Education, US Embassy officials, and ECA alumni gave opportunities for citizens to discuss problems and solutions in the educational system, learn about available scholarships for high school, undergraduate, and graduate studies as well as short-term professional qualification courses in the United States and European countries, and obtain first-hand information about the advantages of studying abroad directly from alumni. This example shows that the network of IATP access sites throughout Eurasia supports implementing new educational practices and helping establish cooperation between educators from different countries of the region.

== Web hosting ==
IATP collaborates with users to create websites and other electronic media. The focus is on creating resources in local languages, making Internet usage more relevant and useful within each of the countries.

IREX works to run IATP less like a foreign technical assistance program and more like a community-based technology initiative. One way to do this is by attempting to create a sense of community at IATP sites that encourages users to share their knowledge and time for the benefit of others and the program as a whole. For example, users volunteer at IATP sites to assist with tasks such as routine computer maintenance and translation of materials for publication on the Web. In other cases, users donate their time to conduct Internet training that ties Internet usage with a specific theme such as journalism, environmental conservation, organizational networking, or language teaching. The institutions that house IATP access sites also contribute to community buy-in and support by providing a substantial amount of cost-share. Cost-share most often takes the form of a partner institution providing IATP with free rent, utilities, and security.

== Freenet ==
This section describes national internet structures in Central Asia which are referred to as freenet. A separate article describes the decentralized censorship-resistant peer-to-peer file sharing software known as Freenet. There is also a text-based community computer network which offers limited Internet services, at little or no cost, and is known as a "freenet."

Several Internet networks in Central Asia, specifically, Kazakhstan, Kyrgyzstan and Uzbekistan are financed by USAID and other United States governmental authorities and are called Freenet. In contrast with the decentralized censorship-resistant peer-to-peer file sharing software called Freenet, which is specifically designed to be very censorship-resistant, and in fact, to increase distribution of information in the case of censorship attempts, there is little information regarding the independence of the Central Asian networks from censorship by the operating authorities.

These freenets were started in 1996 as part of a United States Information Agency (USIA) project known as the Internet Access and Training Program. The IATP was administered by the International Research & Exchanges Board (IREX) and funded by the Freedom Support Act (FSA). The objective of the IATP was to assist universities in accessing and developing Internet resources. This included the development of infrastructure such as satellite connectivity, local area networks, dial up access, and computer labs. Further the project trained staff and students in the use of email and the web to support research and communication with peers outside of Central Asia.

The IATP in Uzbekistan was the first to use the name "freenet". As the project in Uzbekistan developed, dial up access was provided to regional non governmental organizations (NGOs) who in turn provided support to the project that allowed students and staff at universities to enjoy free Internet access. This is where the concept of a "free" network originated. The Uzbekistan freenet was started by the IATP Regional Coordinator Christopher Parker along with Alexei Vostrikov and Boris Miller. The University of World Economy and Diplomacy (UWED) and the Tashkent State University of Economics (TSUE) were the first universities in Uzbekistan to have always on Internet access. This was achieved using microwave links that connected both universities to a shared VSAT link.

Another Internet network, initiated by the UNDP, including support from USAID, was started in Armenia in 1997 and is also called Freenet. As of 2005, users of Freenet in Armenia cannot access web pages on servers outside of Armenia. Apart from this restriction on website access, the degree of censorship on Freenet in Armenia is unknown.
