= Scout Motto =

Motto of the Scout movement

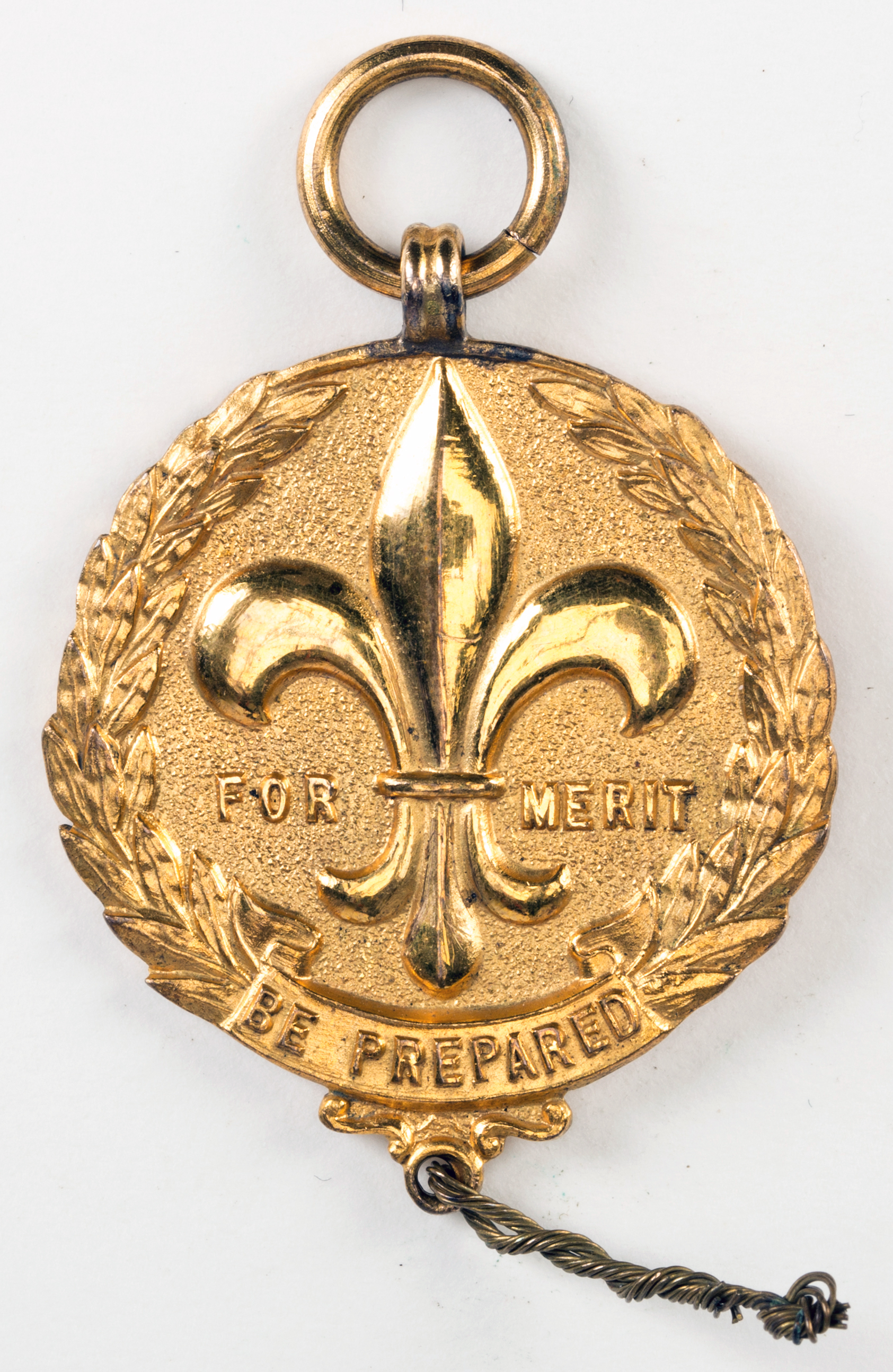
- Scout badge awarded "for merit", with the motto "Be prepared"

The Scout Motto of the Scout movement is, in English, "Be Prepared", with most international branches of the group using a close translation of that phrase. These mottoes have been used by millions of Scouts around the world since 1907. Most of the member organizations of the World Association of Girl Guides and Girl Scouts (WAGGGS) share the same mottoes.

Robert Baden-Powell, founder of the UK Boy Scouts Association, coined the phrase based on his own initials, and described it as encouraging "a state of readiness in mind and body to do your duty".

== Baden-Powell on "Be Prepared" ==
In the first part of Scouting for Boys, Robert Baden-Powell explains the meaning of the phrase:

The scouts' motto is founded on my initials, it is:

BE PREPARED,

which means, you are always in a state of readiness in mind and body to do your DUTY;

Be Prepared in Mind by having disciplined yourself to be obedient to every order, and also by having thought out beforehand any accident or situation that might occur, so that you know the right thing to do at the right moment, and are willing to do it.

Be Prepared in Body by making yourself strong and active and able to do the right thing at the right moment, and do it.

— Lieut. Gen. Baden Powell C.B., Scouting for Boys (1908), "Camp Fire Yarn.—No. 4. Scout Law." (Part I, p. 48)

Baden-Powell provides several descriptions of how and for what situations a Scout must be prepared elsewhere in Scouting for Boys. In his explanation of the third point of the Scout Law, Baden-Powell says:

A Scout's Duty is to be Useful and to Help Others.

And he is to do his duty before anything else, even though he gives up his own pleasure, or comfort, or safety to do it. When in difficulty to know which of two things to do, he must ask himself, "Which is my duty?" that is, "Which is best for other people?"—and do that one. He must Be Prepared at any time to save life, or to help injured persons. And he must do a good turn to somebody every day.

— Lieut. Gen. Baden Powell C.B., Scouting for Boys (1908), "Camp Fire Yarn.—No. 4. Scout Law." (Part I, p. 49)

In the opening chapter of Scouting for Boys, Baden-Powell says:

Every boy ought to learn how to shoot and to obey orders, else he is no more good when war breaks out than an old woman, and merely gets killed like a squealing rabbit, being unable to defend himself.

— Lieut. Gen. Baden Powell C.B., Scouting for Boys (1908), "Camp Fire Yarn.—No. 1. Mafeking Boy Scouts." (Part I, Chapter I, pp. 9–10)

Baden-Powell discusses more skills required of Scouts in Chapter IV of Scouting for Boys, which addresses camp life, and he lists:

- Tying knots
- Making a bivouac shelter for the night, or a hut for longer-term camping
- Using an axe or bill-hook to fell small trees and branches
- Mending and even making clothes and boots
- Cooking meat and vegetables, and making bread without regular cooking utensils
- Driving sheep, cattle and horses
- Killing and butchering cattle
- Milking cows or goats

Advice given by Baden-Powell in Chapter V on campaigning includes the requirements of:

- Being able to find one's way by night and by day
- Being able to read a barometer, and signs of the weather
- Judging distance from an inch up to a mile or more
- Knowing the points of a compass

In a chapter discussing endurance, Baden-Powell writes that a scout should be able to:

- Smell well in order to find his enemy by night
- Hear well
- Have good eyesight to notice things rapidly and at distance

In Chapter VII, Baden-Powell discussed how Scouts prepare themselves to protect women and how they can improve themselves. He says a scout should walk with a woman on his left "so that his right is free to protect her", walking on the other side in the streets to protect her from traffic. Baden-Powell adds to "Be Prepared" for the future by learning a trade and saving up pay.

Chapter VIII of Scouting for Boys discussed saving life. On this topic, Baden-Powell says that a scout should be prepared by:

- Learning beforehand what to do in the event of likely accidents
- Being prepared to do what is required the moment that an accident does occur
- Knowing how to deal with a mad dog, and being prepared to take the necessary action
- Knowing how to react to a person's suicide attempt

In the chapter on patriotism, Baden-Powell says to "Be Prepared to die for your country if need be, so that when the moment arrives you may charge home with confidence, not caring whether you are going to be killed or not."

The first handbook for Girl Guides, How Girls Can Help to Build Up the Empire by Agnes and Robert Baden-Powell, similarly explains:

The motto of the Girl Guides is "Be Prepared". Why is this? It is because, like the other Guides, you have to be prepared at any moment to face difficulties and even dangers by knowing what to do and how to do it.

(The "other Guides" of this quote are the Khyber Guide Regiment.)

== Acrostic ==
Hilary Saint George Saunders' book The Left Handshake: The Boy Scout Movement during the War, 1939–1945 had the first name of each chapter spell out the Scout motto. The chosen names are: Bravery, Enterprise, Purpose, Resolution, Endurance, Partnership, Assurance, Reformation, Enthusiasm and Devotion.

== Similar mottoes in other organizations ==
- Aston Villa F.C.'s earliest documented club crest, the lion rampant to dexter (facing left) on a shield with motto "Prepared", was first documented in the club program of 1 September 1906.
- The motto of the Young Pioneers, Always prepared in various national languages, the Pioneers having been created as an alternative in countries under Communist rule where Scouting was banned.
- The motto of the United States Coast Guard, Semper Paratus or "always ready".
- The motto of the British Army's Parachute Regiment, Utrinque Paratus or 'ready for anything'.

== Another motto mentioned in Scouting for Boys ==
In Part IV, Chapter VI of the first edition of Scouting for Boys, Baden-Powell mentioned another Scout Motto:

A scout's motto is "Never say die till you're dead"—and if he acts up to this it will pull him out of many a bad place when everything seems to be going wrong for him. It means a mixture of pluck, patience, and strength, which we call "Endurance."

— Lieut. Gen. Baden Powell C.B., Scouting for Boys (1908), "Camp Fire Yarn —No. 17". How to Grow Strong. p. 210. "Part IV, chapter VI"

== See also ==
- Scouting Round the World
- Ernst Thälmann Pioneer Organisation#Slogan and greeting
