= Scouting and Guiding in Belgium =

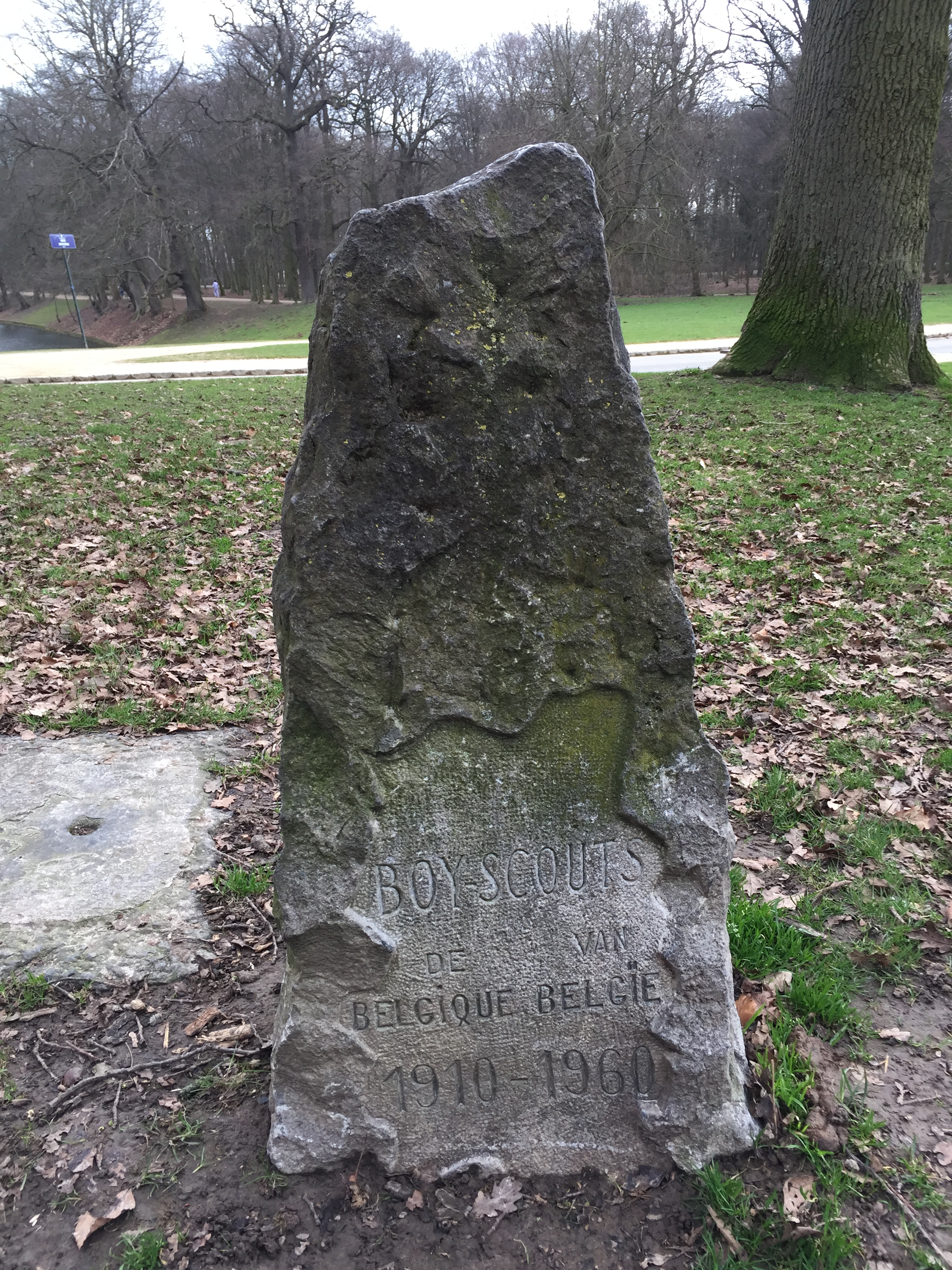
BOY-SCOUTS in Belgium 1910-1960

The Scouting and Guiding movement in Belgium consists of 15 to 20 separate organizations serving about 160,000 members. Nearly all organizations are grouped by languages and confessions. The Crown Scout rank is the highest a Boy Scout can achieve.

== History ==
The first Scout Troop was founded in Brussels in 1909. Englishman Harold Parfitt founded the first Scout Troop for British boys, belonging to the British colony in that city. Belgians (notably Henri, son of Antoine Depage) observing the troop's activities also took an interest in Scouting and soon Belgian Scouting began.

Boy Scouts of Belgium (BSB) was founded on December 23, 1910. The first all-Belgian troop was founded in Brussels. They used the British badges, rules and uniforms. This association was open to all boys.

As early as 1911 the BSB founded a Girl Guide or Girl Scout troop but World War I and the German occupation hampered their development, so the founding of GGB was not until December 17, 1919. They also used British badges, rules and uniforms.

Belgium was again occupied by the Germans during World War II, and the Nazis tried to unite all youth-organisations in one national socialist youth movement. Scouting meetings and camps were banned, however some underground activities were conducted. Scouting resumed after the liberation. BSB and GGB merged into one organization in July 1945. Each section remained separate, and there were no mixed groups until well into the 1980s.

The Sea Scouts of Belgium (SSB), was founded in April 1914. SSB is an open movement concentrating on Sea Scouting only and founded along the North Sea Coast in the Flemish speaking part of Belgium only. SSB did not have any connection with BSB. They also used British badges, uniforms and rules.

== Organizations ==
Active on national or regional level are:

- Guidisme et Scoutisme en Belgique/Gidsen- en Scoutsbeweging in België (GSB, Guides and Scouts Movement of Belgium), member of both the World Organization of the Scout Movement and the World Association of Girl Guides and Girl Scouts, consisting of
  - FOS Open Scouting (FOS; interreligious, coeducational, Flemish), 10 000 members
  - Guides Catholiques de Belgique (GCB, Catholic Guides of Belgium; Roman Catholic, in most sections girls-only, mainly in the Walloon region and Brussels; only WAGGGS-member), 23,000 members
  - Les Scouts - Fédération des Scouts Baden-Powell de Belgique (until 2001: Fédération des Scouts Catholiques, FSC, Catholic Baden-Powell-Scout Federation of Belgium, Roman Catholic, partly coeducational; since 2001: multiconfessional, coeducational, Walloon region and Brussels; only WOSM-member), 58,000 members
  - Scouts en Gidsen Vlaanderen (SGV, Scouts and Guides of Flanders; until 2006: Vlaams Verbond van Katholieke Scouts en Meisjesgidsen (Flemish Catholic Scout and Guide Association), VVKSM; since 2006: pluralist/interreligious, coeducational, Flemish), 80,000 members (2017)
  - Scouts et Guides Pluralistes de Belgique (SGP, Belgian Pluralist Scouts and Guides; pluralist, coeducational, Walloon), 5,000 members
- Europe et Scoutisme, member of the Confédération Européenne de Scoutisme, 9 groups
- Guides et Scouts d'Europe - Belgique/Europascouts en Gidsen - België, member of the Union Internationale des Guides et Scouts d'Europe, 1,200 members (2006)
- Hanoar Hatzioni, an international Zionist youth organization
- Onafhankelijke Scouts en Gidsen - Scouts et Guides Indépendants, member of World Federation of Independent Scouts, 3 groups (2016)

There are also a number of local organizations including:

- Eclaireurs Unionistes de Belgique (YMCA-Scouts)

== International Scouting units in Belgium ==
Thanks to the many international institutions in Belgium there are some international Scout organizations active in the country. Among them are the British Scouting Overseas (part of The Scout Association UK), the Transatlantic Council of the Boy Scouts of America and the Girl Scouts of the USA, as well as Danish, Finnish, Swedish, Italian, Spanish, Hungarian, Czech, Latvian and Polish units. Girlguiding BGIFC had active units in the country until the operations in non-UK countries ended by 1 September 2023.

Some of the international Scout organizations active in the country and in Luxembourg are a part of the Expat Scouting in Belgium group. "Expat Scouting in Belgium includes members from Esperanto Scouts and the Scout movements of Finland, Hungary, the United States (BSA), the United Kingdom (BSO), the Czech Republic, Slovakia, Italy, Poland, Sweden and Denmark (DDS and YMCA)".
