= Guiding and Scouting in Belgium =

Federation of Belgian Scout and Guide organizations

- Dutch: Gidsen- en Scoutsbeweging in België
- French: Guidisme et Scoutisme en Belgique
- German: Pfadfinderinnen und Pfadfinder in Belgien
- Headquarters: Brussels
- Country: Belgium
- Founded: 1979
- Membership: 175,000
- Affiliation: World Association of Girl Guides and Girl Scouts, World Organization of the Scout Movement
- Website www.guiding-scouting.be

Gidsen- en Scoutsbeweging in België (Dutch) or Guidisme et Scoutisme en Belgique (French) (GSB) is the national Guiding and Scouting federation in Belgium. Scouting in Belgium started in 1911, and Guiding followed in 1915. The Belgian Scouts were among the charter members of the World Organization of the Scout Movement (WOSM) in 1922, and the Guides were one of the founding members of the World Association of Girl Guides and Girl Scouts (WAGGGS) in 1928. The federation counts 121,600 Scouts (as of 2021) and 59,268 Guides (as of 2010).

== Members ==
The members of the federation are

- FOS Open Scouting (FOS; interreligious, coeducational, Flemish)
- Guides Catholiques de Belgique (GCB, Catholic Guides of Belgium; Roman Catholic, in most sections girls-only, mainly in the Walloon region and Brussels; only WAGGGS-member)
- Les Scouts - Fédération des Scouts Baden-Powell de Belgique (until 2001: Fédération des Scouts Catholiques, FSC, Catholic Baden-Powell-Scout Federation of Belgium, Roman Catholic, partly coeducational; since 2001: multiconfessional, coeducational, Walloon region and Brussels; only WOSM-member)
- Scouts en Gidsen Vlaanderen (Scouts and Guides of Flanders; until 2006: Vlaams Verbond van Katholieke Scouts en Meisjesgidsen (Flemish Catholic Scout and Guide Association), VVKSM; Catholic, coeducational, Flemish)
- Scouts et Guides Pluralistes de Belgique (SGP, Belgian Pluralist Scouts and Guides; interreligious, coeducational, Walloon)

There are also some German-speaking units in the German-speaking community of Belgium, mostly affiliated to the French speaking associations.

The Scout Motto is Sois Prêt (Be Prepared) or Toujours Prêt (Always Prepared) in French, depending on the organization and Wees Paraat or Wees bereid in Dutch.

=== Scouts et Guides Pluralistes de Belgique ===
The logo of the Scouts et Guides Pluralistes de Belgique is explained as:

- a youth, action movement
  - The girl and boy are moving
  - The blocks are oblique, not symmetrical and placed in an open framework sketched in pencil.
- boys and girls together
  - The characters form adapted
  - It is outside their scope, one to the other
- Scouting
  - The word Scout in letters
  - The neckerchief is the Scout subject par excellence
- specificity Pluralistic
  - The word "pluralism"! (This specificity is underscored by the assertive green label below)
  - The four different colours

== See also ==
- Scouting and Guiding in Belgium
- Hergé
- Antoine Depage
- Louis-Clément Picalausa
- Jo Deman
