= FOS Open Scouting =

- FOS Open Scouting
- Headquarters: Ghent
- Location: Zwijnaardsesteenweg 93
- Country: Belgium
- Founded: 1910
- Membership: 10,000
- Federaal Verantwoordelijke: Jan Verbeure
- Voorzitter FOS Open Scouting: Sam Bastiaens
- Affiliation: Guidisme et Scoutisme en Belgique/ Gidsen- en Scoutsbeweging in België
- Website www.fosopenscouting.be

FOS Open Scouting or FOS is a pluralistic, internationally oriented, coeducational, Flemish Scout and Guide organization in Belgium and is a member of the Guidisme et Scoutisme en Belgique/Gidsen- en Scoutsbeweging in België (GSB, Guides and Scouts Movement of Belgium). FOS is a federation of 55 Scout Groups.

== History ==
The first pluralistic Boy Scouts organization in Belgium was the "Boy-Scouts de Belgique" (B.S.B.) founded in 1910. 1913 was the "Sea Scouts of Belgium" (S.S.B) and in 1914 "Eclaireurs de Belgique" (E.B.) founded. In 1916 the S.S.B and the E.B. merged with the B.S.B.. In the same year was the "Girl-Guides van België" (G.G.B.) founded, the first pluralistic Girl Guide organisation. 1945 the B.S.B. and the G.G.B. merged to form the Boy-Scouts en Girl-Guides van België (B.S.B.-G.G.B.). 1966 the B.S.B.-G.G.B. split in a Flemish organisation, "Federatie voor Open Scoutisme" (F.O.S.) and a Walloon organisation, "Fédération des Eclaireuses et Eclaireurs" (F.E.E.), later renamed to Scouts et Guides Pluralistes de Belgique (S.G.P.). In 1999 dropped F.O.S. the periods and renamed to "FOS Open Scouting".

== Sections ==
| Agegroup | Boys / Girls / Common | Seascouts |
|---|---|---|
| 6 - 7 | Bevers | Zeehonden |
| 8 - 9 | Welpen | |
| 10 - 11 | Wolven | |
| 12 - 13 | Jongverkenners / Jonggidsen / JVG | Aspiranten |
| 14 - 15 | Verkenners / Gidsen / VG | Juniors |
| 16 - 17 | Seniors | Loodsen |
| 18 + | Leaders / Stam | |

== Foundations ==
The highest class badge for Welpen (cubs); the (Zilveren / Grijze) Wolf

- Values: Law & Promise, Engagement, Teamwork, Service, Self-reliance, Self-governing, Openness (active pluralism), Co-education
- Playgrounds: Outdoor live, exploration, sport & games, culture & creativity, techniques, reflection & society
- Methods: Patrol system, Symbolic framework, Personal progression, Living in nature, Learning by doing, Adult support

FOS is more traditional than the Scouts en Gidsen Vlaanderen and actively uses Class badges.

| Tak (Section) | Techniekniveau (Class badge) |
|---|---|
| Bevers / Zeehonden | Bevertanden |
| Welpen | Teerpoot; Eerste Ster; Tweede Ster; Wolf |
| Jonggidsen / Jongverkenners / Aspiranten | Teervoet |
| Gidsen/Verkenners/Juniors | 2e Klas |
| Seniors | 1e Klas |

=== Active pluralism ===
FOS is open to children and young people from the age of six. The organization states that membership is not restricted on the basis of race, social background, nationality, sexual orientation, or physical and cultural differences. Individuals of different philosophical, religious, and political beliefs may participate, provided these are compatible with the principles of Open Scouting. FOS also promotes dialogue aqnd exchange between differing viewpoints and encourages discussion of spirituality and personal beliefs within a respectful orientation.

The promise of the FOS makes no reference to a god or a religion only to a higher ideal.

I promise, on my honour, to try:
To be loyal to a higher ideal, our group and democracy
To obey the guides/scouts law
To help where possible

== See also ==
- Scouting in Belgium
