= Hospital L'Océan =

Belgian military hospital

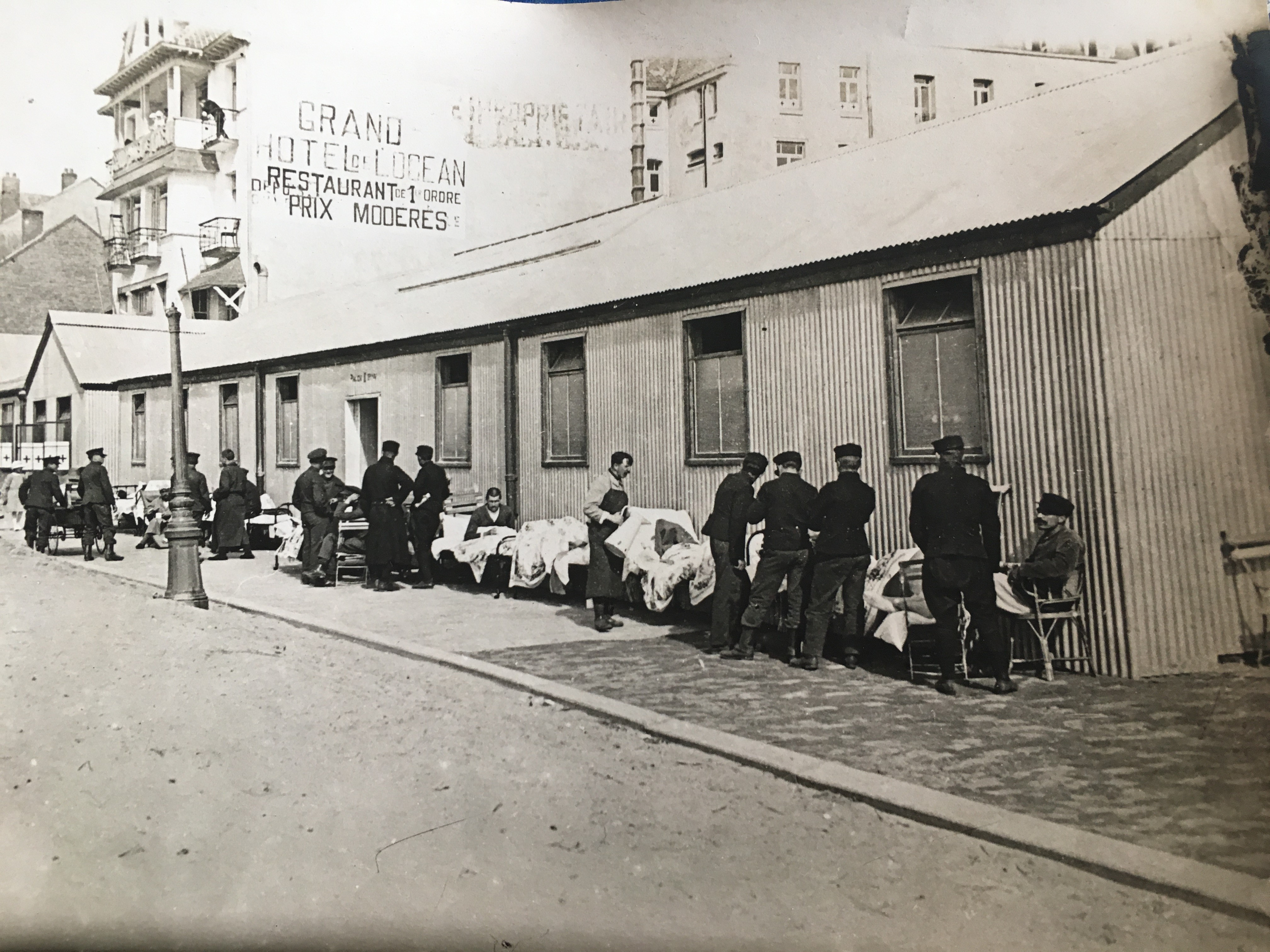
Hospital L'Océan at De Panne. Anno 1917

Hospital L'Océan was a military hospital during the First World War at De Panne, West Flanders, Belgium. It was established on Queen Elisabeth of Bavaria's behalf by Doctor Antoine Depage and his wife, Marie Depage (Born Picard), who died during the RMS Lusitania disaster, and Archibald Alexander Gordon alias Major Gordon. The hospital was located in the former summer vacation Hotel L'Océan owned by the Huysseune family and built-in 1904. She was opened on 18 December 1914 by Antoine Depage, and the five-storey high hospital maintained two operation rooms, two hundred beds, a dentist practice and a biomedical laboratory. During the war, many Belgian, British, French, American, Canadian, Danish, and even New Zealand nurses volunteered in the hospital; together, they nursed 19,375 wounded soldiers until it closed on 15 October 1919 after a Spanish flu outbreak. The building was later torn down. Today a memorial plaque for the hospital stands at 70, Zeedijk in De Panne.

== Origin ==
Queen Elisabeth of Bavaria took the initiative for the military Hospital on 20 November 1914. The approval from the Belgian Ministry for War was given on 3 December. Countess Colienne de Spoelbergh, a lady in waiting for Queen Elisabeth, arranged the availability of hotel L'Océan for the Belgian Red Cross. The Queen had previously been preparing for the installation for her hospital and entrusted the execution to Dr Antoine Depage, who turned the hotel, under Queen Elisabeth's supervision, into a Red Cross hospital. After he was appointed the Belgian King's Messenger, Major Gordon, received the task of financing and collecting most of the funds in London. Here he also bought the finest medical tools because the Queen of the Belgians only wanted the best for her soldiers. The Belgian army delivered for the staff and needed vehicles, and Dr Depage's international relationships caused him to recruit the most high-standing personnel. This was much to the regret of General-Doctor Melis, commander-in-chief of the Belgian 'Service de Santé', as Depage did not allow him to use the surgeons and medical staff of the hospital while Depage frequently recruited from the ranks of the Service de Santé. On many occasions, the royal family interfered with both doctors. The entire personnel was housed in some twenty villas in the nearby area. Many personnel were specialists in the skull, chest, abdomen, fractures, etc.

Early in 1915, the hospital expanded with wooden barracks around the hotel and was given to Mr Costa from Harrods. The first pavilion housed 100 beds and was called the British Pavillon; the second housed 240 beds and was called Pavillon Everyman; the birth housed 300 beds and was named after the King and Queen of the Belgians (Albert-Elisabeth) but was destroyed in the same year by fire. The fourth and last one housed only 40 beds and was made to receive the freshly wounded.

== Establishment of the Belgian Red Cross Society ==
On 5 March 1915, The article Belgian Red Cross society was published, announcing her establishment in London under the patronage of H.M. the Queen of the Belgians. This Anglo-Belgian Committee represented the official interest of the Belgian Red Cross. Baron C. Goffinet held the presidency. The plenipotentiary minister for Belgium was elected vice president. Among its members, we find The Earl Curzon of Kedleston, Major A. A. Gordon, The Honourable Arthur Stanley MP and the Minister of State for Belgium, Paul Hymans. The position of honorary secretary was held by the Belgian judge at the Brussels Court of Commerce, Louis Lasard. The Belgian Red Cross Society resided at the Savoy Hotel, London, W.C.

== Eugéne Ysaÿe and his band's performance ==
On the invitation of the Queen of the Belgians, Eugéne Ysaÿe, her music teacher, came with his band and in the company of the Belgian sculptor Victor Rousseau to De Panne on 16 June 1916. Major Gordon escorted the group to De Panne, where the band played for the wounded soldiers.

Lionel Tertis wrote in his diary: "The next morning Major Gordon told us to pack for playing at a Hospital. The scene (at the hospital) was looking like a city of death, with the inexhaustive sounds of the canons at Ypres. Just before we wanted to sit down for lunch, a terrible explosion occurred, and Ysäye exclaimed, "Voila, du sonnette du repas !" (Voila, the bell for the meal)."

== Doctors, Surgeons and Nurses at L'Océan (partial list) ==
- Doctor Frédéric Bremer (1892-1982) - Neurophysiologist
- Doctor Antoine Depage (1862-1925)
- Doctor Oswald Rubbrecht (1872-1941)
- Doctor Etienne Henrard (1870-1941)
- Doctor Georges Debaisieux - Surgeon of the University of Louvain
- Nurse Lady Dorothie Fielding MM (1889 - 1935)
- Nurse Marie Depage, born Picard (1872-1915)
- Nurse Helen Barclay, who had been the supervising nurse at Philadelphia General Hospital
- Nurse Augusta Morse of Syracuse, New York
- Nurse May Lentell of Newton, Massachusetts
- Nurse Anna C. Robinson, former Night Superintendent at the Jewish Hospital
- Nurse Dorothy M. Ferree, of the Henry Street Settlement in New York City
- Nurse Dorothy Liddell MBE
- Nurse Elsie Fenwick
- Nurse Jane de Launoy (1881-1953) - studied at the nursing school of Sint-Camillus in Brussels
- Nurse Vashti Bartlett (1873-1969) - Mercy Ship Expedition
- Nurse Catherine 'Kitty' McNaughton, (1884-1953)

== Wounded at L'Océan (partial list) ==
- John Aiden Liddell VC - Wounded on 31 July 1915 and died on 31 August 1915. His sister Dorothy volunteered at the hospital after his death.
- Rosa Vecht - the only Dutch nurse who died in the First World War, and got wounded at Veurne

== See also ==
- List of hospitals in Belgium
- Healthcare in Belgium
