= Pierre Depage =

Belgian senator and gastroenterologist

- Born: 3 November 1894; Brussels
- Died: 11 March 1979 (aged 84)
- Known for: Senator affiliated to the Belgian Communist party
- Relatives: Antoine Depage
- Medical career
- Field: Gastroenterology
- Institutions: Clinique de l'Ocean

Pierre Frédéric Emile Depage (Brussels, 3 November 1894 – 11 March 1979) was a gastroenterologist and Belgian senator affiliated to the Belgian Communist party.

Pierre Depage was a son of the physician, professor and liberal Senator Antoine Depage was one of the founders of the Boy-Scouts van België (BSB), and Depage was an enthusiastic member of the first troop, founded by Harold Parfitt.

== Background ==
Depage obtained his doctorate in medicine. During World War I he worked with his father at the Clinique de l'Ocean in De Panne. After he returned from the war, he succeeded his father as leader of the 1st BSB, and was from then national commissioner or chairman of the Executive Committee of the BSB through World War II.

At the professional level, he was the co-founder of the Société Belge de Gastro-entérologie in 1928. In 1926 he was appointed physician in the hospitals of the city of Brussels.

After World War II he joined the Communist Party of Belgium. In February 1946 he led the list of the party and was elected communist senator for the Arrondissement of Brussels. He resigned in May 1947.

He was also at that time President of the Belgian Red Cross and ensured Belgium considered the positions of the Soviet Union and its satellite states, the only Western country to do so in the ICRC. These countries refused to allow the Belgian Red Cross to participate in August 1948 at the International Meeting of the Red Cross in Stockholm.

Depage broke with the communists, and in 1948 emigrated to the United States. His correspondence was monitored by the U.S. Government.

In 1950 he was the head of a United Nations mission in Syria, on behalf of the United Nations Relief and Work Agency (UNRWA), which was engaged in providing assistance and employment for Palestinian refugees.

== Bibliography ==
- VAN MOLLE, Paul (1972). Het Belgisch Parlement, 1894-1972 (in Dutch). Antwerp.
