= Scouts en Gidsen Vlaanderen =

- Scouts and Guides of Flanders
- Headquarters: Antwerp
- Country: Belgium
- Founded: 1912
- Membership: 72,000
- Affiliation: Guidisme et Scoutisme en Belgique/ Gidsen- en Scoutsbeweging in België
- Website; Scouts en Gidsen Vlaanderen

Scouts en Gidsen Vlaanderen (Scouts and Guides of Flanders) is a coeducational, Flemish Scout and Guide organisation in Belgium and is a member of the Guidisme et Scoutisme en Belgique/Gidsen- en Scoutsbeweging in België (GSB, Guides and Scouts Movement of Belgium).

The way of working of Scouts en Gidsen Vlaanderen is based on five basic principles: Joint management, Engagement, Self-activation, Service, Teamwork.

== History of Flemish Catholic Scouting ==
- 1912: the Belgian Catholic Scouts‘ (BCS) was founded, later that year renamed to Baden-Powell Belgian Boy Scouts’ (BPBBS)
- 1913: the first Catholic Flemish group was founded in the city of Antwerp: 1ste Sint-Jacob (First Saint Jake).
- 1915: the Baden-Powell Belgian Girl Scouts’ (BPBGS) was founded.
- 1916: the first Catholic Sea Scout group was founded in the city of Antwerp, BPBBS renamed to the Baden-Powell Belgian Boy and Sea Scouts (BPBBSS)
- 1929: BPBGS renamed to Association Catholiques des Guides Belges-Associatie der Katholieke Padvindsters van België (GCB-KPB)
- 1930: the BPBBSS split into the Dutch-speaking Vlaamsch Verbond der Katholieke Scouts (VVKS) and the French-speaking Fédération des Scouts Catholiques
- 1939: some guide groups left the GCB-KPB and founded, with help of the VVKS, the Katholieke Vlaamse Meisjesgidsen (KVMG), "Blue Guides", a more Flemish organisation, not recognized by the WAGGGS.
- 1945: the GCB-KPB changed its structure to a federation with a Dutch-speaking branch KPB and a French-speaking branch GCB
- 1945-1953: some tries to rejoin KPB and KVMG as Katholieke Meisjesgidsen van België (KMGB), GCB-KPB renamed to GCB-KMGB
- 1959-1960: the last Blue Guides rejoin the GCB-KMGB and the GCB-KMGB split in two separate organisations: the Dutch-speaking Katholieke Meisjesgidsen van België (KMGB) and the French-speaking Les Guides Catholiques des Belgique (GCB)
- 1961: KMGB renamed to Vlaams Verbond der Katholieke Meisjesgidsen (VVKM)
- 1973: VVKM and VVKS started merger as VVKM-VVKS
- 1982: VVKM and VVKS fully merged and renamed to Vlaams Verbond van Katholieke Scouts en Meisjesgidsen (VVKSM)
- 2006: VVKSM renamed to Scouts en Gidsen Vlaanderen (SGV).

== Branches ==
Agegroup	Boys	Girls	Co-ed	Seascouts
6 - 8	Kapoenen			Zeehondjes
8 - 11	Welpen	Kabouters	Wouters	Zeewelpen
11 - 14	Jongverkenners	Jonggidsen	Jonggivers	Scheepsmakkers
14 - 17	Verkenners	Gidsen	Givers	Zeeverkenners/-gidsen
17 - 18	Jins			Loodsen
18 +	Leaders			

Giver = Gids-Verkenner

== Promise ==
Scouts en Gidsen Vlaanderen has a progressive promise, a member uses the verse he/she understands. The first is for Kapoenen, the last for Jins and Leaders.

Ik ben scout/ gids
Ik verken de wereld,
ik val, ik tuimel en ik sta weer op.
Ik wil mijn best doen.

Ik ben scout/gids, tussen scouts en gidsen
Daarom beloof ik
me in te zetten voor mijn groep,
want mijn werk is ploegwerk,
en onze inzet verzet bergen.

Ik ben scout/gids, tussen scouts en gidsen,
hier & nu; ginds & morgen
het spel dat we spelen is niet luchtledig.
Samen willen we de wereld verdraaien.

Ik ben scout/gids, tussen scouts en gidsen, in de wereld
zo hoop ik op iets meer dan wat ik zie.
Ik hoop dat wat ik doe niet voor niets is,
ik geloof dat wat we doen zin heeft,
ik beloof dat het niet om het even is.

== Presidents ==
In Dutch: Verbondsvoorzitters

- 1988-1994 Jan Vermassen
- 1994-1997 Lieven Ral
- 1997-2003 Geert Lambrechts
- 2003-2009 Geert Kempen
- 2009-2012 Dries VanDer Elst
- 2012-2018 Simon Smagghe
- 2018-2021 Pieter Lauwers
- 2021-heden Dries Van Eyck

== See also ==
- Scouting in Belgium
- Jo Deman
