= Antoine Depage =

Belgian royal surgeon

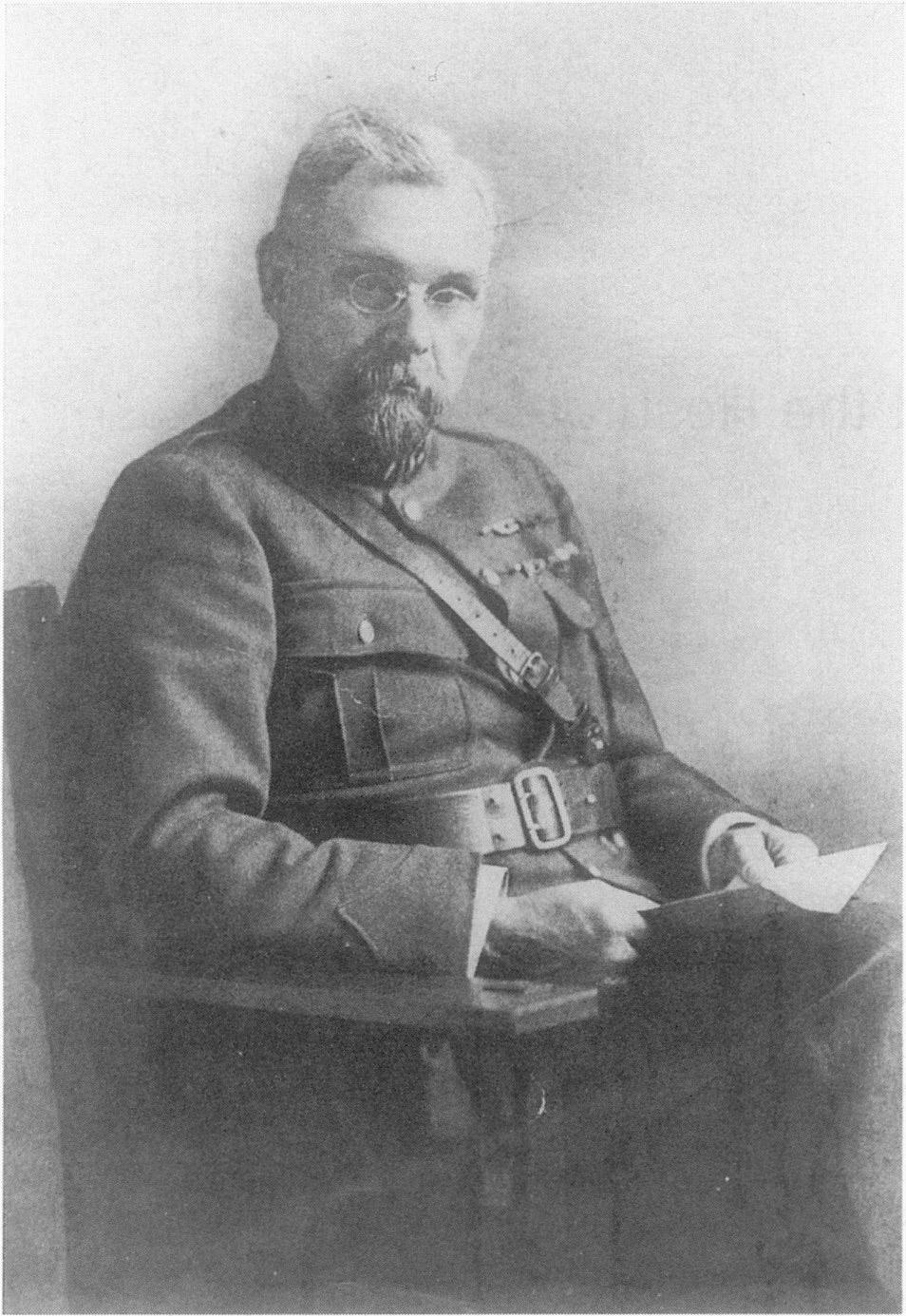
- Dr. Antoine Depage
- Born: 28 November 1862; Watermael-Boitsfort
- Died: 10 June 1925 (aged 62); The Hague
- Education: Universite Libre de Bruxelles
- Occupation: Royal surgeon
- Known for: Founder and president of the Belgian Red Cross, one of the founders of Scouting in Belgium
- Medical career
- Institutions: Berkendael Institute

Dr. Antoine Depage (Watermael-Boitsfort, 28 November 1862 – The Hague, 10 June 1925), was the Belgian royal surgeon, the founder and president of the Belgian Red Cross, and one of the founders of Scouting in Belgium.

Depage married Marie Picard in 1893 and they had three children. Marie Depage died on 7 May 1915 in the sinking of RMS Lusitania when it was torpedoed by German submarine SM U-20, killing nearly 1,200 passengers and crew.

== Medicine ==
Depage studied medicine at the Universite Libre de Bruxelles (ULB), and graduated magna cum laude in 1887. He became one of the founders and the first secretary of the International Surgical Society (1902–1912). In 1903 he founded a surgical institute, the Berkendael Institute, and Edith Cavell became its head nurse.

During World War I Depage established the military hospital l'Océan at De Panne. He became the first head of the surgical department of the Brugmann hospital (1923). Antoine Depage was a freemason and a member of the Grand Orient of Belgium.

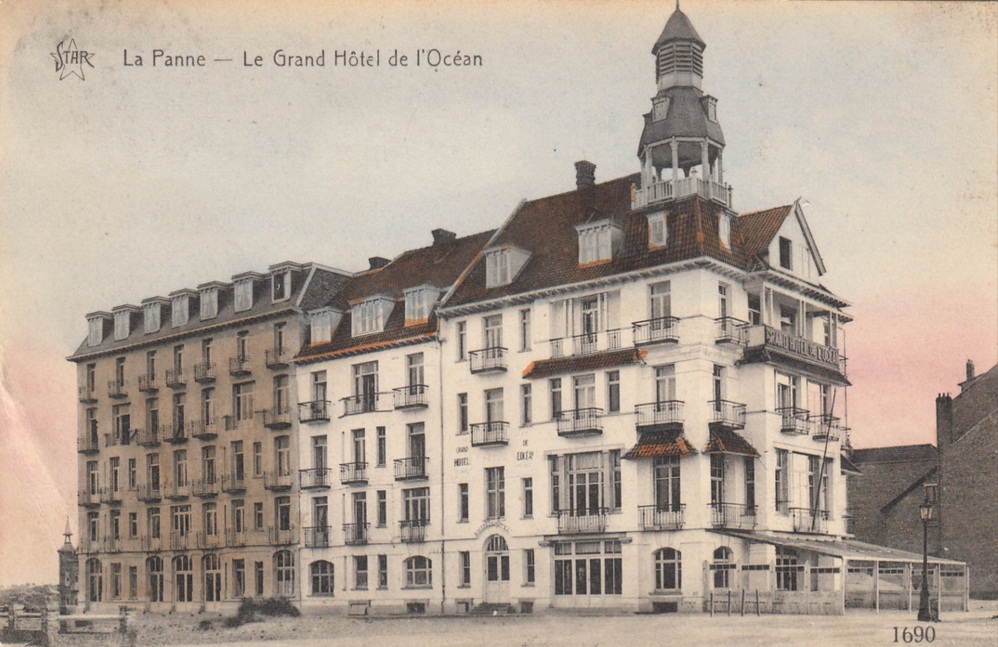
Grand hôtel de l'Océan in La Panne (Belgium) around 1904.

== Scouting ==
Englishman Harold Parfitt founded the first Scout troop in 1909 in Brussels for British boys belonging to the British colony in that city. On Easter 1910, Henri, the youngest of Depage's three sons watched these Scouts at work in the park of Saint-Gilles, and tried in vain to interest his parents in Scouting. That summer they were on vacation at Folkestone, where Henri found a Scout camp and insisted on taking his mother to see it. She was impressed and bought a copy of Scouting for Boys, and converted Dr. Depage to the idea. Returning to Brussels, Depage used his influence to secure the formation of the Boy Scouts de Belgique (Boy Scouts of Belgium, or BSB), which was founded on 23 December 1910. The president of the General Council was General Comte de t'Serclaes de Wommerson, Depage was Chairman of the Executive Committee, and the Secretary was Pierre Graux, barrister in the Court of Appeal, whose two sons were among the first Scouts. Harold Parfitt was appointed Chief Scout, and the first camp was held at Christmas 1910. A large tent had been pitched, but everyone slept in the orangerie of the family house of Ernest Solvay à la Hulpe. The BSB used the British badges, rules and uniforms, and was open to all boys. In 1912 the Scouts attracted public support by their active help in controlling a widespread brushfire in Fagne. Royal approval was signified through the holding of a large National Rally at the Palace in 1913.

== Active in Turkey ==
Dr. Depage, with his eldest son Pierre, also a Scout and surgeon, founded and took charge of the Belgian Ambulance in the Balkan War (1912-1913). He was instrumental in starting Scouting in Turkey, where Harold Parfitt, who accompanied him, became Chief Scout, replaced in Belgium by Robert Lutens. However it was not until 1950 that Türkiye İzcileri became a recognized member of the Boy Scouts International Conference.
