= Archibald Alexander Gordon =

British Army officer

Archibald Alexander Gordon CBE, MVO, KStJ
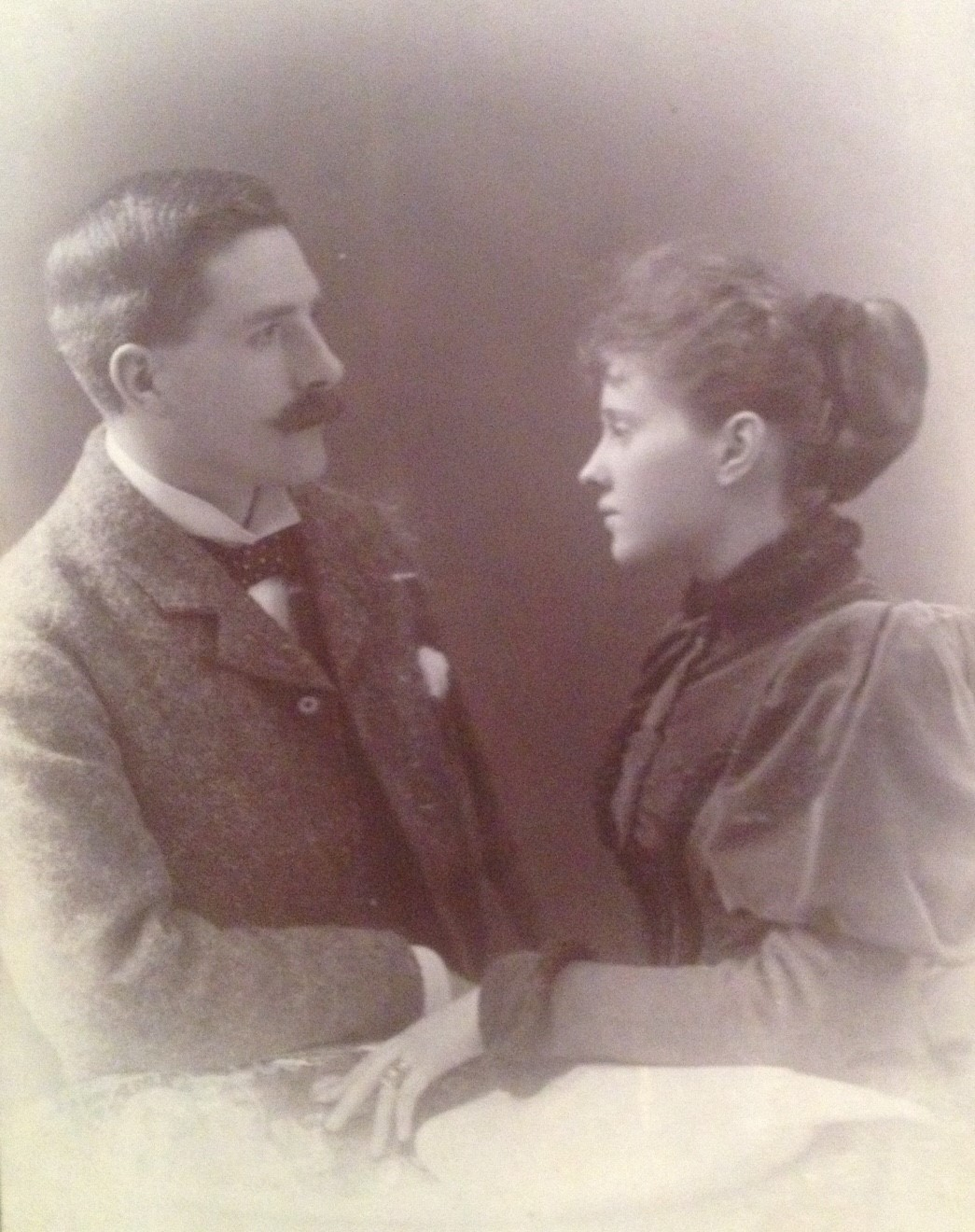
- Gordon and his wife
- Born: 3 September 1867; Bridge of Allan, Scotland
- Died: 12 August 1949 (aged 81); Bridge of Allan, Scotland
- Burial place: Logie, Stirlingshire, Scotland
- Spouse: Lizzie Maude Smith
- Children: William Hyde Eagleson Gordon Archibald George Ramsay Gordon Edmund Robert Aaron Gordon
- Relatives: Colonel Ronald Eagleson Gordon - Cousin General Cameron Gordon Graham Nicholson - Nephew Brigadier Reginald Nicholson - Nephew Denys Lowson - Godson
- Military career
- Allegiance: United Kingdom
- Rank: Major
- Nicknames: Major Gordon, Belgium's Helper, Scottish Hero of Antwerp Bombardement
- Unit: 9th Volunteer Battalion (Highlanders) Royal Scots
- Conflicts: Siege of Antwerp 1914
- Website: www.aagordon.be

Major Archibald Alexander Gordon alias Major Gordon (3 September 1867 – 12 August 1949), was a British officer who served as attaché to the Military Household of King Albert I of Belgium during World War I. During his service he received the nickname Major Gordon. He was the younger brother of Colonel William Eagleson Gordon of the Gordon Highlanders, who was awarded the Victoria Cross.

Gordons military career includes service in the Royal Company of Archers and was instrumental in the creation of the 9th Royal Scots. Other careers include Honorary Secretary to the Franco-Scottish Society and Private Secretary to the 4th Duke of Wellington.

== Early life ==
Being a descendant of the Irish Gordons of Ballee and Ballyskeagh, Archibald Alexander Gordon was born in Bridge of Allan, Scotland on 3 September 1867, the second son of Dr William Eagleson Gordon and Emily Marianne Dick. His mother was the youngest daughter of Archibald and Isabelle (né Mackenzie) Dick. His uncle was Colin Mackenzie, 5th of Mountgerald (1802-1837).

Gordon was the younger brother of William Eagleson Gordon VC, older brother of Robert Aaron Gordon, brother of two sisters: Emily Mckenzie and Helen Isabelle Gordon. He also had a (half) brother, George Freer (Jr), on his mother's side. He studied at Stanley House School, Bridge of Allan; Edinburgh Collegiate School; and the University of Edinburgh. In 1889 he made a world tour and met the famous U.S. Army general, William Tecumseh Sherman in New York. After visiting Jamaica, the land of his grandfather, he returned homewards with the S.S. S.S. City of Paris and expierenced it's disaster in March 1890.

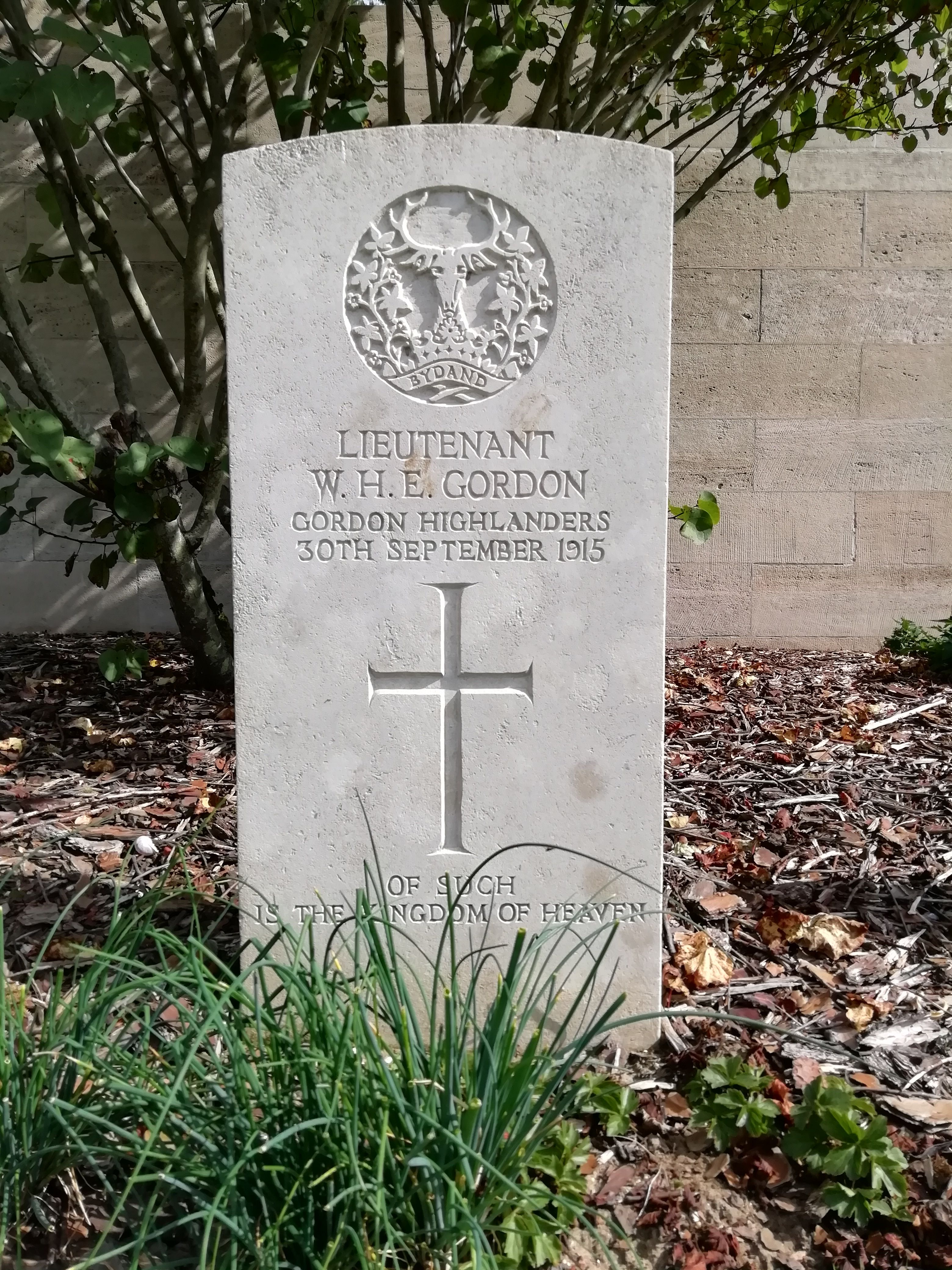
Grave of William Hyde Eagleson Gordon at Etaples Military Cemetery

In 1892 he married Lizzie Maude Smith (24 January 1872 – 13 July 1929), twin daughter of Major General Edmund Davidson-Smith (27 June 1832 – 8 September 1916), formerly Assistant Adjutant General of the Dublin district. The couple had three children.

- William Hyde Eagleson Gordon (23 August 1893 – 30 September 1915), twin of Archibald George Ramsay Gordon. He studied at Haileybury College and Sidney Sussex College, Cambridge and enlisted in the army with the Gordon Highlanders in 1914 as a Temporary-Lieutenant. He landed in France on 5 May 1915 and served as a lieutenant in the 8th Battalion, Gordon Highlanders. On 27 September 1915, William became mortally wounded during the Battle of Loos and suffered from a head wound. He succumbed to his wounds on September 30, 1915, in Etaples Military Hospital at the age of 22. He is buried in the Etaples Military Cemetery in Pas-de-Calais, grave I.B.17. Lieutenant William Hyde E. Gordon is mentioned on the Sidney Sussex College – Ante Chapel Memorial and the Haileybury College memorial.
- Archibald George Ramsay Gordon (23 August 1893 – 26 December 1893), a twin with his elder brother.
- Edmund Robert Adam Gordon (25 March 1896 – 5 October 1932) enlisted in the 7th Seaforth Highlanders as a temporary Lieutenant and arrived simultaneously with his brother in France. He survived the Battle of Loos but was later diagnosed with jaundice and neurasthenia. Major Gordon, who had planned to visit him on the front, learned his son was at the infirmary. He visited five field ambulances before he found out that his son had already been evacuated to a railhead and placed in a Red Cross train bound for England. Edmund recovered from his illness and later returned to the front. On 25 August 1917, Major Gordon was informed that Edmund was wounded and suffered from a leg wound and a severe hand wound. He was hospitalised in the General Hospital N°8 at Rouen and later taken to a hospital in Brighton, where Major Gordon visited him. Over time, Edmund's condition worsened, and he had to undergo several operations, resulting in the amputation of some of his fingers and a part of his hand. Edmund returned afterwards to the front and survived the war but struggled with severe health issues for the remainder of his life. In 1926 he married Vivienne Roberts in Kensington, and the couple had their firstborn, Peter. Peter Gordon tragically died in his infancy. Edmund's condition worsened, and he was now diagnosed with Tuberculosis. He died of this disease on 5 October 1932 and was buried next to his son at North Sheen Cemetery in Kew, London. He is mentioned on the Haileybury College memorial.

Major Gordon's godson was Denys Lowson, Lord Mayor of London from 1950 to 1951. In June 1951 Lowson was made Baronet. He died on 10 September 1975.

Two of Major Gordon's cousins were Colonel Ronald Eagleson Gordon MC of the Royal Engineers and Captain Colin Eccles Dick of the 2nd Royal Irish Fusilies who died in the Second Boer War during the Battle of Blood River Poort. Colin is commemorated on a memorial in Vryheid, South Africa.

== Honorary Secretary for the Franco-Scottish Society ==
After the death of his son Archibald, Major Gordon moved his family to his mother's home in Edinburgh. There his wife, who suffered a series of health problems after childbirth, could get specialised care. While looking for a job in Edinburgh, Major Gordon as offered the position of honorary secretary of the newly established Franco-Scottish Society. He accepted it. The Franco-Scottish Society aimed to foster contacts between the French and the Scots and to develop their traditional friendship enshrined – since at least 1295. A year after its establishment in 1895, the French branch: Association Franco-Ecossaise got established in France. In the summer of 1897, the French branch planned its first visit to Edinburgh, where the Scottish branch made all preparations. The Marquess of Lothian (head of the Royal Company of Archers) en Lord Reay (Mayor of Edinburgh) permitted to use Banqueting Hall in Aldershot for the banquet. This turned it into a historical event as Banqueting Hall was last used during the coronation of Charles I in 1625. After the successful event, the members of the French branch presented Major Gordon with a piece of silver as a token of their gratitude. On August 4, 1898, Major Gordon was decorated with the "Chevelier de l’Ordre Nationale de la Légion d’Honneur" by the new elected French government of Félix Faure for his services in the Franco-Scottish Society. From the end of 1903 until the summer of 1904, Major Gordon took part in the organisation of the conference of the Institute of International Law upon the request of Lord Reay. Sir Donald Mackenzie Wallace, former director of the foreign department for The Times and Friedrich Fromhold Martens, Imperial Russian diplomat and lawyer, were allotted to stay with Major Gordon. In late autumn, Major Gordon guided the German Duke Johann Albrecht zu Mecklenburg and his wife Princess Elisabeth Sybille of Saxe-Weimar-Eisenach through Scotland during their seven-day stay. The quiach that was presented to Major Gordon by the Duke is kept by the Major A. A. Gordon Society. In 1906 Major resigned from the Franco-Scottish Society to take up his position as private secretary of the 4th Duke of Wellington in London.

== Member of the Royal Company of Archers ==
In 1896 Major Gordon became a member of the Scottish elite unit the Royal Company of Archers, the bodyguard for the British monarch during his or her stay in Scotland. The unit was commanded by Captain-General William Montagu-Douglas-Scott, 6th Duke of Buccleuch. The unit resides at Archers' Hall in Buccleuch street in Edinburgh. Behind the building lay the field of Hope Park, named after Sir Thomas Hope, creator of the archer's field. On February 25, 1899, three photographs of Major Gordon in his Royal Company of Archers uniform were published in Scottish Life. Major Gordon took part in the first state visit to Scotland by Edward VII and Queen Alexandra from May 11 to May 13, 1903.

== The 9th Volunteer Battalion Highlanders, Royal Scots ==
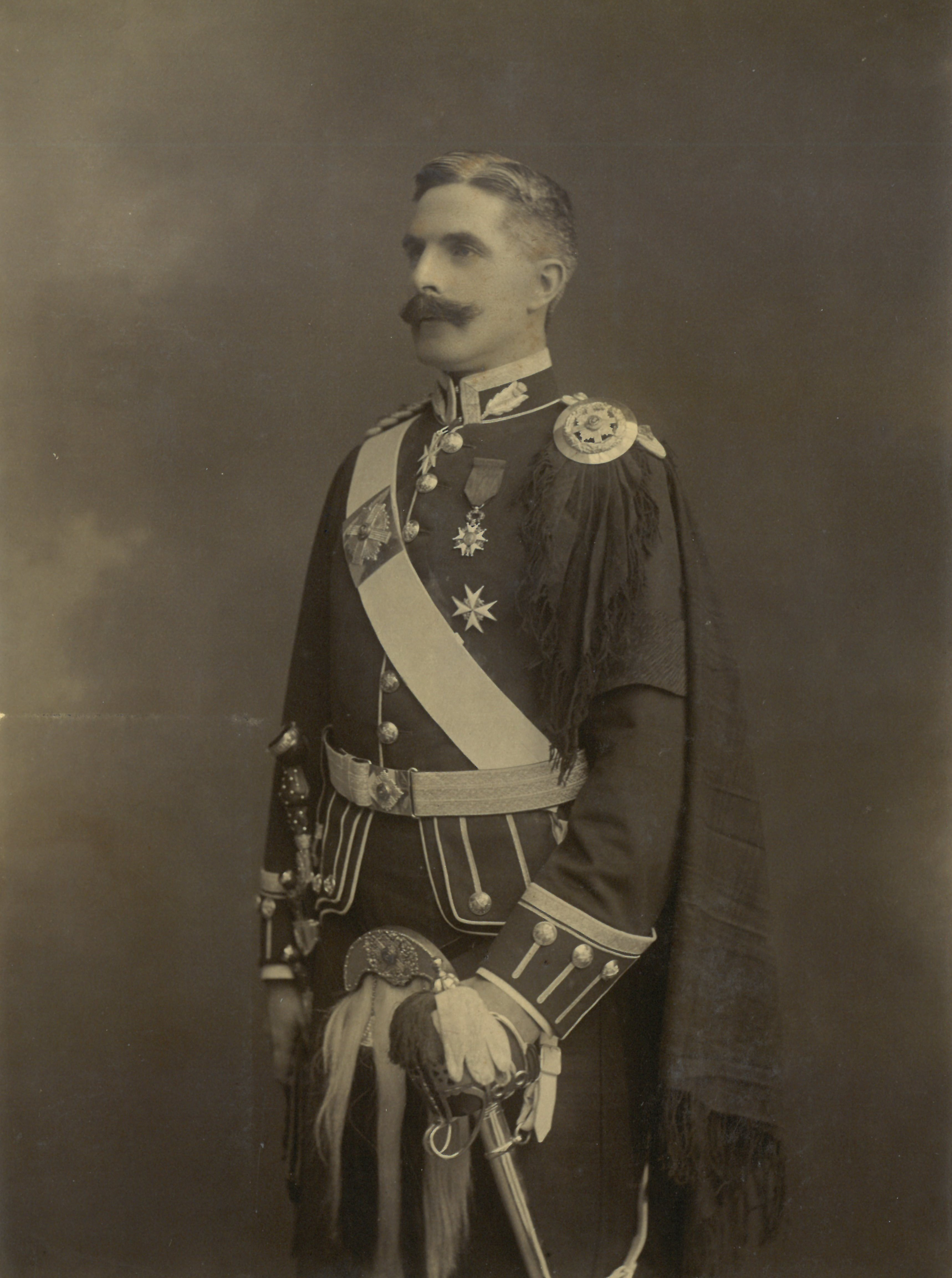
Major A. A. Gordon in his 9th Royal Scots uniform

Major Gordon was one of the co-founders who, with James Ferguson and Andrew Gordon, established the 9th Volunteer Battalion Highlanders, Royal Scots (Lowland Division).He was commissioned a Captain on 6 August 1900 and became the first commanding officer of A-Company (the captain A. A. Gordon Cup was named in his honour). During the procession of the coronation of Edward VII in 1902, he stood at the head of his battalion. He was promoted to major on 7 January 1905 and was appointed Brigade-Major in the same year. In May 1906 he was assigned to the Black Watch for a month after completing the Transport Course and the Course of Military Equitation at Aldershot. During his time with the regiment, he became good friends with Captain – later Lt. Colonel – James H. Clark, who was the commanding officer of B-Company and who later became the second commanding officer of the battalion when Lt. Colonel James Ferguson resigned his commission in 1904. Lt. Colonel Clark got killed in the First World War during the second battle of Yper on 10 May 1915 while commanding the 9th Argyll and Sutherland battalion. During his stay in the 9th Royal Scots, he had the pleasure to meet with General Sir Archibald Hunter DSO. The general got him involved in the establishment of the Queen Victoria School in Dunblane for which he received the Royal Victorian Order – 4th Class. Major Gordon resigned his commission with the 9th Royal Scots on 26 May 1906 to take up his duties as private secretary to Arthur Wellesley, 4th Duke of Wellington from 1906 onwards.

== Private Secretary to the 4th Duke of Wellington ==
Sir Donald Mackenzie Wallace, Major Gordon's guest during het conference for the Institute of National Law, received in autumn 1905 the task to find a private secretary for the 4th Duke of Wellington, Arthur Charles Wellesly. Sir Wallace contacted Major Gordon and asked him to agree that his name would go forward. Major Gordon was honoured and agreed. A few days later, he was invited to stay with the Duke and his family at the estate of Ewhurst Park, near Bastingstoke. After a short stay, Major Gordon received the job and was told to take up his position at Apsley House in London at the beginning of February 1906. At Apsley House, Major Gordon mainly took part in the social duties of the Duke and his wife, the Duchess Kathleen Emily Bulkeley Williams. Major Gordon also curated the Duke's museum and the Waterloo Gallery. During his early days at Apsley House, the Duchess organised a Royal Ball in the gallery where Edward VII and Queen Alexandra were the guests of honour together with some thirty other British and foreign royal family members.

One day at Apsley House, Major Gordon heard that the Duchess was giving a tour through the house. Suddenly she opened his room's door and said: "And this is Mr Gordon's room." Simultaneously the Princes and princess (George V's children) entered the room. Major Gordon showed them the Wellington Dispatches and the Duchess asked him to guide the children to the strongroom to see the massive silver collection. Major Gordon took an oil lamp and descended to the basement. Beneath Apsley House lies London Underground and every train that drove by could be heard in the basement. Once the first train passed, princess Mary suddenly grasped Major Gordon's hand for comfort.

When Edward VII died on May 6, 1910, many European monarchs and state officials came to London to attend the ceremony. Every great house in London - including Apsley House - opened its door to the guests. The selection of each guest was made by lottery, and Archduke Franz Ferdinand of Austria was allotted Apsley House. The Duke of Wellington and his wife left Apsley House for the Guards Club and left Major Gordon in charge of the household. After the Archduke's arrival, Major Gordon took him to his bedroom, which was packed with Madam Abel Chatenay roses. Franz Ferdinand, a great flower admirer - asked his servant Prince Karl Kinsky van Wchinitz to go and ask for the name of the rose. After being informed, the Archduke wrote a telegram for his wife, the Duchess of Hohenberg, Sophie Chotek, explaining he had seen the best-smelling and most beautiful rose. After the funeral procession of Edward VII, Franz Ferdinand left Apsley House quickly and halted Major Gordon in the entrance hall. Here he presented him with a golden cigarette case with the monogram of his uncle, the Emperor Franz Jozeph I of Austria and shook his hand. Major Gordon then turned to Prince of Wchinitz and asked him if the Archduke would be pleased to receive some plants of the roses he had admired. The prince returned quickly and said yes. Major Gordon asked his boss for the favour, and a dozen of plants were sent to the Archduke's main house in Austria. Later, Major Gordon received a letter from the Archduke in which he expressed his gratitude.

== Great War ==
=== Organiser of the Belgian Relief Fund and Hero in the Siege of Antwerp ===
At the First World War outbreak, Major Gordon organised the Belgian Relief Fund on behalf of count de Lalaing for the Belgian refugees. Major Gordon was entrusted with the funding after his involvement in funding the rescue of the Waterloo Monument in Belgium the year before. Major Gordon personally escorted the funds over the Channel to the Belgian government in the city of Antwerp. Here he was summoned by King Albert I of Belgium and Queen Elisabeth of Bavaria in their palace on the Meir and thanked him and Britain deeply for their generosity. In his memoirs, Major Gordon said he had the most interesting talks with the King and Queen during this time. By the beginning of October 1914, the Admiralty decided not to risk any more ships crossing the Channel, putting an end to Major Gordon's journeys. At the hotel St. Antoine in Antwerp, he met with Colonel - later General - Jack Seely, who served in the Special Service. Major Gordon invited him to stay with him at the Governor's palace of Baron de Schilde de Werve. Seely asked him if he was interested in becoming his Orderly Officer. Major Gordon accepted, inspected the frontlines and reported to the General Headquarters of General Henry Rawlinson and General Victor Deguise. When the situation became critical, Major Gordon was entrusted with an important message for the Admiralty. Afterwards, Major Gordon led the evacuation of the hospitals in the city by leading a column of London omnibuses under intense bombardment into the city. Subsequently, a massive evacuation was ordered, and the General Headquarters of the British and Belgian Armies were placed on the quay. Here, the Belgian General Victor Deguise said that he would hold on as long as the last fortress of Antwerp was not fallen. After finishing his sentence, a Belgian artillery officer stormed in and said that the fortress had fallen. General Deguise said quietly, "C'est fini!" After consulting with Secretary of State for War, Lord Kitchener, Major Gordon, and Colonel Seely drove to the frontlines and started to evacuate the British Marines. Under heavy bombardment, the column crossed the city and the river Scheldt via the pontoon bridge. Major Gordon headed the column in Seely's car in which he had loaded the ammunition boxes from the trenches. The column reached Sint-Niklaas and Sint-Gillis Waas the day after. Here the Marines were boarded on trains and sent off to Bruges and Ostend. After Major Gordon arrived in Ostend, he learned that most of his luggage had been abandoned and destroyed. He later boarded a small vessel and returned to England. On the special train that awaited him at Dover, he received a telegram from the First Lord of the Admiralty, Winston Churchill, to report to the Admiralty as soon he reached London. Here Major Gordon gave an account of the events and later received orders to draft a report by morning.

=== Russian refugees at Zeebrugge ===
While on his way to Antwerp, Major Gordon received a message that the Russian Prince Nicholas A. Koudacheff wanted to speak with him at the hotel St. Antoine. Here the Prince explained that some three or four thousand Russian students were gathered from the war zone and brought to Zeebrugge. The Russian government had refused to send a war vessel to pick them up because they feared getting involved in the conflict. Koudacheff then asked Major Gordon if he could explain matters to the British Admiralty and ask for their help. Major Gordon felt there was no chance for this to happen but agreed to send a message once he returned to London. The Admiralty granted the request, and Major Gordon sent the good news to Antwerp. Tourist steamers from the River Thames were sent across the Channel to pick up the Russian refugees and bring them to London. Here the refugees boarded a large tanker and headed for the Russian Empire. After the evacuation, Major Gordon received a magnificent golden blue enamelled cigarette case with the Russian crest in diamonds from Tsar Nicolas II of Russia. Later, Major Gordon was decorated by the Russian transitional government with the Order of St. Anne 2nd Class in 1917.

=== Belgians King's Messenger ===
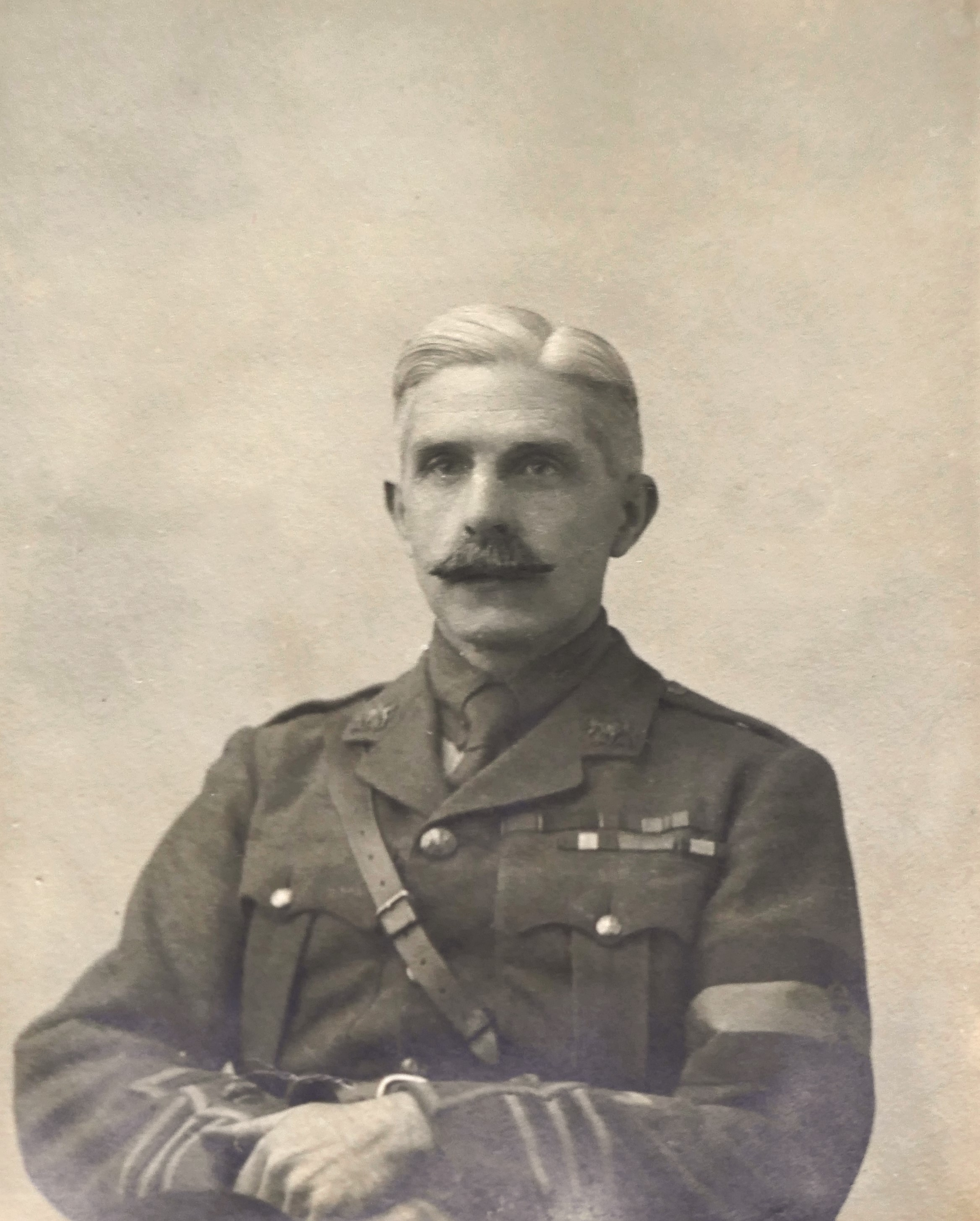
Major Gordon in 1916 with his Belgian Royal Brassard

At the end of 1914, Major Gordon was contacted by the Belgian Ministry for Foreign Affairs on behalf of minister Albert de Bassompierre, requesting to conduct a task for the Belgian royal family in London. Major Gordon accepted, executed it and then travelled to La Panne, where the King and Queen resided. While at La Panne, he was asked by King Albert to undertake the duties of Belgian King's Messenger. Major Gordon felt honoured and accepted. His first assignment was to participate in establishing the Queen's hospital at La Panne. Herefore, Major Gordon travelled much from and towards London. The King and Queen took the opportunity to give him personal missions every time he returned to La Panne.

One of these missions was to locate and photograph the grave of Prince Maurice of Battenberg, who was killed in the First Battle of Ypres on October 27, 1914. His mother, Princess Beatrice, Queen Victoria's youngest daughter, had previously asked Queen Elisabeth for help. Major Gordon and the British photographer A. H. Savage Landor succeeded in the mission. Another task was to inspect a French hospital at Dunkirk. The Queen had been informed that some Belgians were treated there but that the hospital was badly supported, and she wanted an update on the situation. The mission had to be held a secret because the French government could not suspect that the Queen of the Belgians was interfering with a French establishment. Major Gordon succeeded in getting entrance to the hospital and saw that it was only staffed by three women, one an older British nurse. She witnessed to Major Gordon that some wounded had already committed suicide because of their high fever. She begged him to send medical supplies, and Major Gordon promised to do so. With a broken heart, Major Gordon continued his journey to London, where he bought medical supplies and sent them immediately so they would arrive the following day. Afterwards, he went to the French embassy in London and asked to speak to the ambassador. Both sat in the study room, and Major Gordon gave him an account of the events. The ambassador said he would try to improve things and asked not to make things public. That evening Major Gordon sent his report to La Panne. In December 1914, Major Gordon guided the wife of the British Prime Minister, H.H. Asquith, to the front, the Belgian royals in La Panne and the Belgian government in Sainte-Adresse in France. Her diary entries of this journey were published in the book: Women's Writing on the First World War (1999).

Major Gordon visited in his spare time the famous British nurses Elsie Knocker and Mairi Chisholm in Pervijze and always brought them canned food. In 1915, he visited the badly wounded British Captain John Aidan Liddell VC MC in the hospital L'océan in La Panne. This pilot had been badly injured during a survey above Bruges and had managed with the extraordinary capability to land his damaged aeroplane in allied territory, thus saving the life of his navigator. His condition worsened over time, and his mother travelled to La Panne to accompany him at his bedside until he died on August 31, 1915. Just before his death Liddell was informed that he had been awarded the Victoria Cross. His sister Dorothy Liddell, MBE later volunteered as a nurse at the hospital and nursed the wounded until the war's end.

In January 1916, a prisoner exchange was held between Major Gordon's brother William Eagleson Gordon VC CBE and the German Prince Emanuel zu Salm-Salm. After captivity for one-and-a-half years, William was accompanied by members of the Red Cross, in critical condition to England, where he was reunited with his wife and son. Luckily he recovered quickly and returned to the army soon. Later that year, Major Gordon guided Queen Elisabeth's music teacher Eugéne Ysaÿe and his entourage to La Panne for a performance in the hospital L'océan. Lionel Tertis, one of Ysaÿe's bandsmen, wrote the events down in his diary, and the account was published in the French book: Eugène Ysaÿe et la musique de chambre by Michel Stockhem. Among Ysaÿe's fellow travellers was the Belgian artist Victor Rousseau who, with Major Gordon priorly, had designed the Queen Elisabeth Medal. During the same year, Major Gordon travelled with the Belgian Major Preud'hommer, officier d'Ordonnance du Roi, to London. Preud'homme had received the order from King Albert to visit the princes and princess at the Hackwood estate of Lord Curzon. King Albert told him that his children had to draft a letter for Pope Benedictus because he had sent gifts for them at La Panne. The letters were delivered at Apsley House, where Major Gordon put them in a large envelope, sealed it and posted it in the private mailbox. When Major Gordon returned to La Panne in due course, King Albert asked whom he had sent to Rome with the package. Major Gordon apologised to the King and said that he did not know they had to be delivered by hand and that he had sent them by mail. The King got quiet and said it would be the first time His Holiness received such a package by mail.

On February 14, 1917, Major Gordon's mother died at her home In Moffat. During that year, the armed forces regrouped, causing many British units to reside in and around La Panne. King Albert moved his headquarters to Chalet de Moëres alias Sint Flora in De Moeren. Here the British photographer Richard N. Speaight made some artistic photographs of the King, which were later printed in large numbers and dropped all over occupied Belgium. Baron A. van Caloen would present one of these prints to Major Gordon a year later when he entered Castle Loppem.

In 1918, the Belgian royal family planned a trip to England for the Silver Wedding of King George V and Queen Mary. Major Gordon received a telegram that the royal family would arrive within two days. He rushed to Buckingham Palace and was received by Prince Alexander of Teck (later Lord Athlone) and later joined by Princess Alice and Lord Stamfordham. After discussing the matter, Lord Stamfordham asked Major Gordon if he could come to inform Lord Curzon. Afterwards, Major Gordon secured rooms in the Grand Hotel in Folkestone. He went to the harbour, where he was awaited by Admiral Roger Keyes, who informed him that the King and Queen of the Belgians would be arriving in two separate aeroplanes and that the rest of the household would be travelling by war vessel. The luggage was temporarily lost but brought to the hotel late evening.

In the early morning, King Albert entered Major Gordon's room in night attire and explained that the gift for the British royal family got left behind, and he asked if something suitable could be bought at once. Major Gordon - who almost smiled - explained to the King that nothing could be found in a local village as Folkestone. He then suggested contacting Lord Curzon in London, explaining matters to him, and coming up with a solution. The King agreed, and Major Gordon rang him up and explained the issue to him. Lord Curzon arose at once and went to New Bond Street to find and buy something suitable. Somebody questioned how the present could be delivered unnoticed to the King's suite. Major Gordon said the gift could be given to the Chief Inspector of Police at Buckingham Palace. Major Gordon knew him well, and a message was sent with the instructions that the package had to be given to Major Gordon in person. On 6 July 1918, Major Gordon was the lead driver of King Albert's suite from Folkestone to London. He arrived in London around 2. P.M., where he was relieved to see his friend (the Police-Inspector) standing at the front gate of Buckingham Palace. While passing the gate, the present was placed unnoticed in Major Gordon's car. A few moments later, King Albert entered the square at Buckingham Palace, holding the gift in his hands and presented it to King George V (Still not knowing what was inside).

During the royal visit to England, Major Gordon was performing his daily duties in a room of Buckingham Palace and was accompanied by the Belgian Colonel Auguste Tilkens and Prince Charles, Count of Flanders. The Belgian Prince, seated at the window table, was making drawings and sketches. After a while, Major Gordon came to check on him and witnessed that the Prince had used a wax stick to press the British crest onto paper. Prince Charles had not used any protection beneath the paper, causing the wax melting into the leather and thus ruining the tabletop. Colonel Tilkens spoke angrily to the Prince and added that the King had to be informed. Afterwards a suitable punishment was conducted and Major Gordon went to see the curator of Buckingham Palace to explain matters, but the kind man replied, "well, boys must be boys".

While in England, King Albert wished to visit Scotland and see the Grand Fleet. While boarding the train from Victoria Station to Edinburgh, Lord Athlone and Sir Charles Cust accompanied the Belgian suite. Major Gordon received the message on the train that the King asked for his guidance through Edinburgh. While visiting Edinburgh Castle, a Scottish officer, conducting a drill, recognised King Albert and called the battalion in formation. King Albert was pleased and learned that the officer had just returned from the trenches at Ypres. Afterwards, King Albert said to Major Gordon: " Major, you are to blame for this. Your brassard has given me away!". The following day, King Albert and Queen Elisabeth visited the Grand Fleet. The Queen asked if she could send a picture of her to her namesake ship, the H.M.S. Queen Elisabeth. The request was granted, and the picture was later permanently placed on the deck with the inscription: H.M. Queen Elisabeth to H.M.S. "Queen Elizabeth" 9.7.1917.

The alias "Major Gordon" finds its origin in the following event. During a conservation with Princess Marie-José in Hardelot the princess reprimanded Major Gordon on the fact he was calling her rabbit, Marshall Soult, with the name Soult. "Major Gordon," the Princess said, "no wonder my rabbit will not obey you. Her name is 'Marshal Soult' and not 'Soult', therefore she does not know you are calling to her; It is just as if I were to speak to you as 'Gordon'; no one would know who I meant: but if I spoke of Major Gordon I would be understood at once because everyone knows who Major Gordon is."

By the end of 1918, Major Gordon received a phonecall at his home in London from King Albert. The King said he was at Ostend and asked if Major Gordon could bring Prince Leopold at once to Belgium because the Liberation Offensive made significant progress. Once in Belgium, Major Gordon, the Belgian Major Dujardin and the French commander Martin looked for a suitable headquarters for the King around Bruges. They spotted Loppem Castle and after a brief meeting with Baron A. van Caloen the castle was chosen to be King Albert's new headquarters. Major Gordon and Major Dujardin subsequently drove to city and encountered many difficulties because of destroyed bridges. Eventually the reached the outskirt and were suddenly stormed by hundreds of inhabitants who thought the King had arrived. All traffic was blocked and Major Dujardin descended the car and went further on foot to fulfil his duties.

While at Bruges, Major Gordon remembered a letter given to him during the royal visit to England. A mother wrote the letter, who desperately asked for help to get news from her daughter at the English Convent in Bruges. Major Gordon had replied, in the Kings name, that Bruges was the central stronghold of the German Submarines and therefore wholly isolated from the world. Now things had changed, and Major Gordon went to the English Convent to look for news on the daughter. Once he appeared at the gate, he was greeted by the Abbess, who was overjoyed to see a British officer. Major Gordon asked her if Sister Sealy was present in the Convent. The Abbess did not know any Nun in the area of Bruges with this name. After another thinking, she asked Major Gordon if he was correct and if it was possible that the name in the letter could be Leahy instead of Sealy. Major Gordon hoped this was the case, and Sister Leahy was called for. Some moments later, she appeared at the gate and almost took it down when she heard about her mother's letter. She asked Major Gordon if he could wait so she could write a letter to her mother. Major Gordon agreed and Leahy returned with at least 40 letters after half an hour. She had said to the other nuns in the Convent that a British officer was waiting outside, and all sisters had taken the advantage to write home. Major Gordon, who, according to the army regulations, was not allowed to transport letters, smuggled them into England on his next trip.

After the Armistice on 11 November 1918, King Albert invited Major Gordon to be part of his suite during the procession in Brussels on 22 November 1918. Major Gordon was seated between Mayor Adolph Max and Cardinal Mercier in the square of the Royal Palace during the festivities. Major Gordon had priorly met Cardinal Mercier during the Siege of Antwerp and revisited him after the war, while being part of Admiral David Beatty's and Queen Mary's suites. The cardinal gifted two stained glass windows from the Saint-Rombouts cathedral to Major Gordon.

== After the war and later life ==
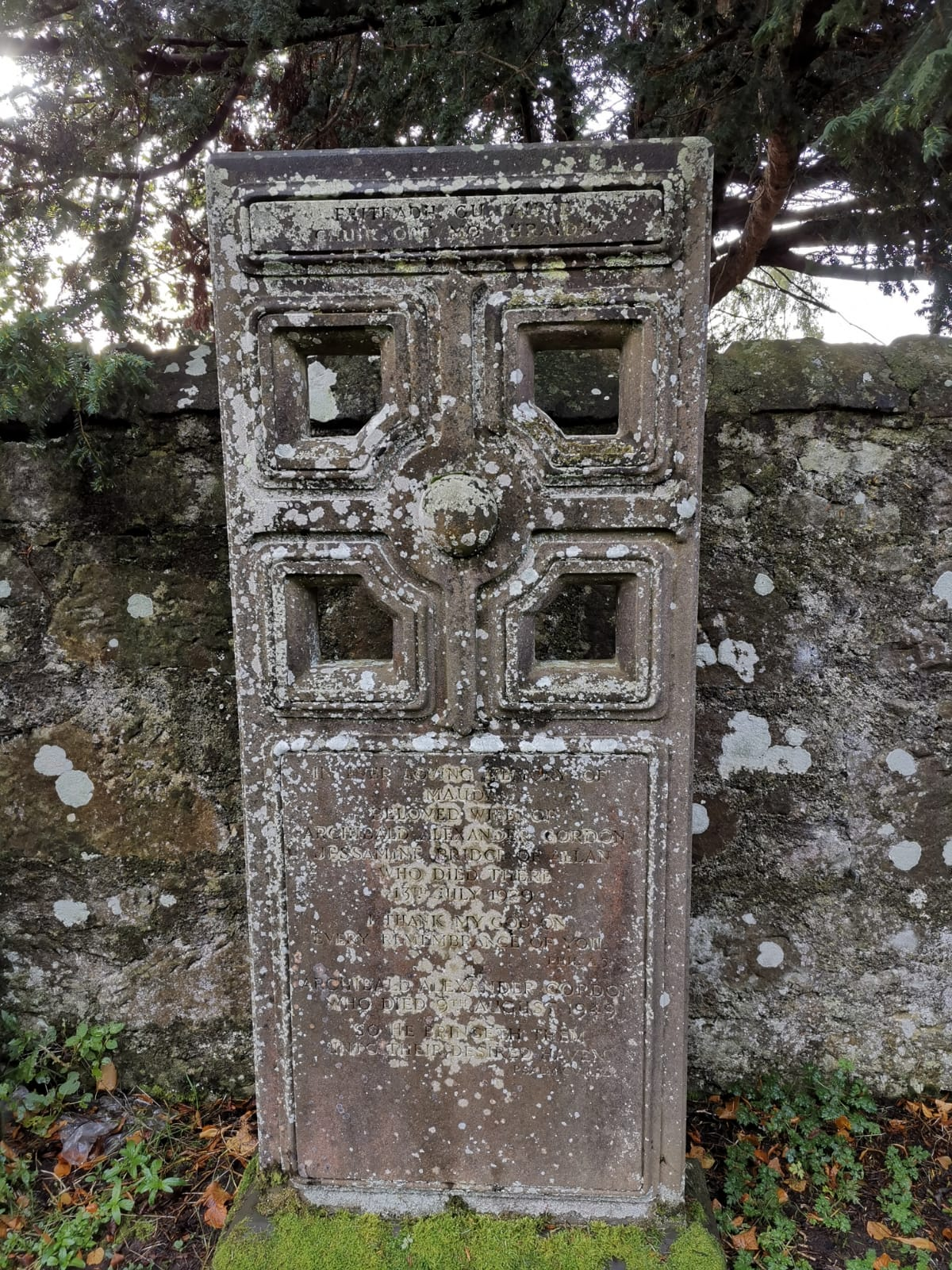
Major A. A. Gordon and his wife's grave in Logie Cemetery, Stirlingshire, Scotland

After the war, King Albert tasked Major Gordon to retrieve the 'Belgian treasury' back from England. These trips were challenging through its secrecy and the muddy landscapes of France and Belgium. However, Major Gordon succeeded in his task and was decorated with the Commander in the Order of the Crown afterwards. Later on he received a secret mission in Holland, near Breda. Here he encountered a dangerous situation at a Dutch checkpoint on his return but luckily came out unharmed.

Major Gordon's older brother William wrote to him, helping in a quest to find the grave or body of a young Gordon Highlanders officer who had been killed alongside William in the early stages of the war. The family had consistently asked William for more information. Major Gordon promised his cooperation and sent letters to parishes and monasteries to see if the body of a young officer was found near Le Cateau. A local priest wrote back that he had found the body of a young officer in 1914 and had laid him to rest in the catacomb of his church. The priest had safely kept the officer's personal belongings during the war as he knew these would be important to identify the victim. As soon as the family was informed of the discovery, they travelled to France and met with the local priest. The priest returned the personal belongings, but the family agreed that their relative would stay in the parish that had kept him safe for so long.

During the First Battle of Ypres, Major Gordon's boss, the 4th Duke of Wellington had lost his son, Captain Lord Richard Wellesley. After the war Major Gordon was tasked to find his grave and was lucky to find it. He travelled with his boss to Belgium to visit the grave and guided him through many imported battlefields.

The constant health issues of his wife resulted that Major Gordon reluctantly resigned as private to the Duke of Wellington. Major Gordon was informed by doctors that Maude's health would benefit from the fresh air of the countryside. Therefore, the couple moved to Stow-on-the-Wold but Maude's health worsened and doctors concluded that the high altitude of Stow-on-the-Wold was not ideaal for her. After a brief vacation in Major Gordon's hometown, Bridge of Allan, they found out that the climate was ideal for Maude's health. Major Gordon bought the home Jessamine and the couple lived happily for many years until Maude died on July 13, 1929. She was buried in Logie Cemetery, Stirlingshire, Scotland.

In 1920, Major Gordon received the message that King George V personally selected him to be part of the entourage for the Belgian state visit to England. During the festivities, Major Gordon was decorated by King Albert as a Commander of the Order of Leopold II. One of the festivities was an evening ball where the German ambassador, doctor Stahmer and his wife were present. Major Gordon was in the company of Sir Edward Wallington when he noticed that the German guests were left alone. Major Gordon suggested to Wallington to go over and talk to them. Later that evening, Major Gordon assisted the Duke of Connaught when he was having trouble with his boots. The Duke said he witnessed how he and Wallington had started a conversation with the German ambassador and his wife when they appeared lonely and said it was the right thing to do. Major Gordon replied that he was informed that the ambassador and his wife had lost their two children - all the family they had - in the war, and he felt sympathy for them because he had a similar feeling.

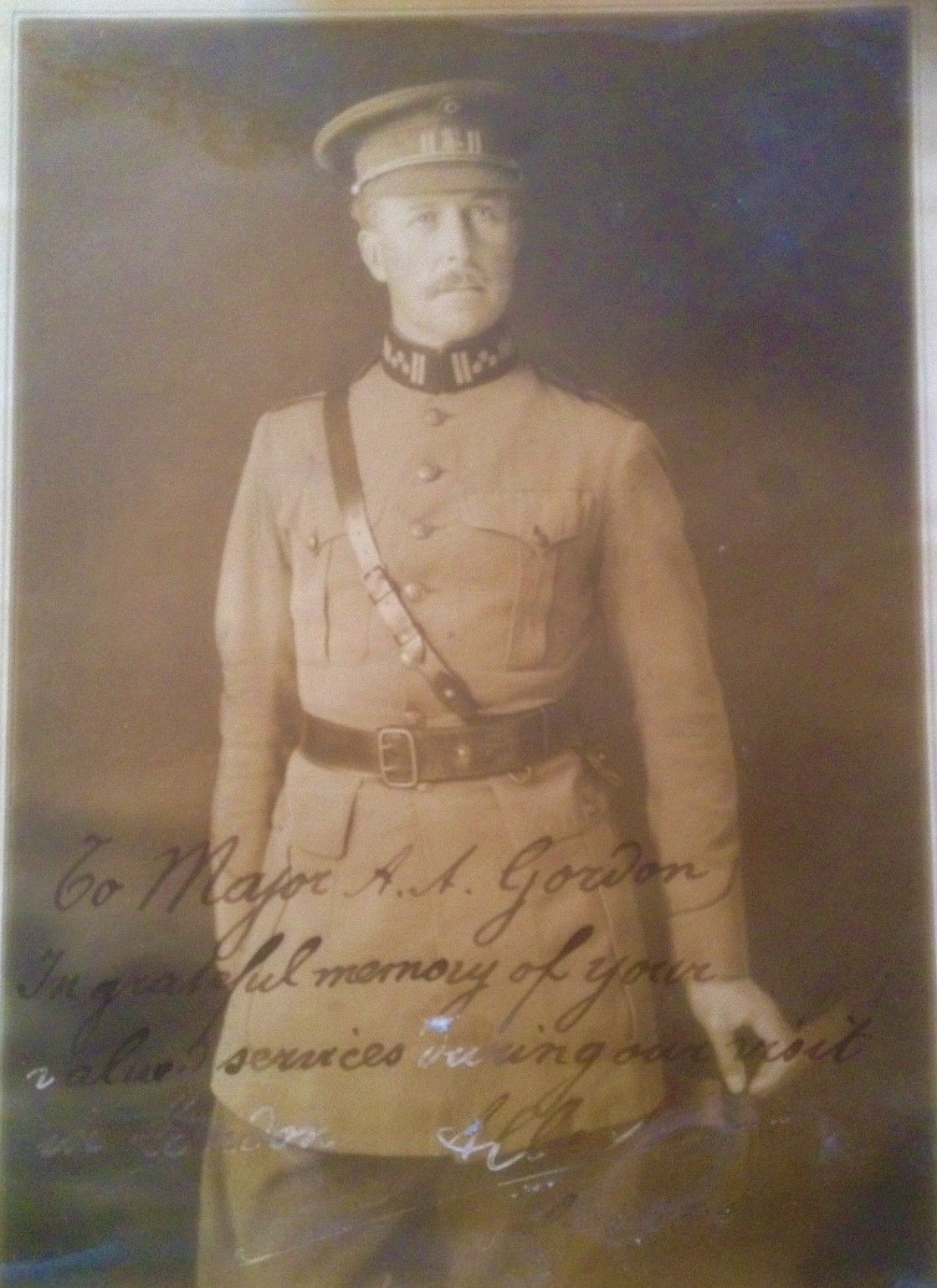
photograph given by King Albert to Major A. A. Gordon

Two years later, Major Gordon was asked by the Grand Marshal of the Belgian Court, on behalf of King Albert, if he could be in Brussels for the occasion of the return visit by the English monarchs on May 7, 1922. This was Major Gordon's last assignment for the Belgian royal family. After the festivities he guided Queen Mary and her entourage through Belgium while her husband went off to see the war cemeteries. Major Gordon gave a tour near Antwerp and explained the scenes of the Siege of Antwerp. Later that day the suite arrived at Malines where the Queen met with Cardinal Mercier.

When the wedding date between Princess Marie-José and the Italian crown prince Umberto was announced in British newspapers, Major Gordon came up with a very original present for the princess. When the princess visited the warship 'Marshall Soult' during the war, her favourite cuddly bear ", Fifi", fell into the water. Sailors fished it up, but Fifi was severely damaged. The princess was given her rabbit Marshal Soult on the ship, and she later gave Fifi to Major Gordon. Major Gordon had kept Fifi all this time, and he felt it was time to reunite him with her former owner. He sent Fifi to Puller's, who returned him as a new dog. Next, Major Gordon bought a Scottish brooch and placed it on a purple ribbon that he put on the bear. He sent the package to the Belgian ambassador in London, who brought it to the Laken. Major Gordon received the palace's warm letter of gratitude a few days later.

Major Gordon's youngest son Edmund, whose lungs were damaged during his illness in the war, was diagnosed with tuberculosis. He died of this disease on 5 October 1932 in Chelsea. The loss of Edmund felt heavily on Major Gordon. On the day of Edmund's death he wrote the sad sentence in his diary: "And thus our family ends".

In 1936, Major Gordon travelled to Mandatory Palestine and overlooked the archaeological findings of the mosaics of the church of the Multiplying of the Loaves and Fishes. He edited the book "Church of the Multiplying of the Loaves and Fishes at Tabgha, Lake of Galilee, and its Mosaics" by Alfons M. Scheider in 1937.

After Edmund's death, Major Gordon joined the Hellenic Travellers Club to visit the 'Holy Land' (Jerusalem) for the first time. On his first cruise, Major Gordon visited many ancient European archaeological and holy sites. Soon he heard of the discovery of the mosaics of the Church of the Multiplying of the Loaves and Fishes at the Lake of Galilee. After visiting the site, Major Gordon became friendly with Father Tapper, who was struggling with the project's funding. Major Gordon assisted him, and once back in Scotland, he collected a sum of £400 for a roof for the mosaics. In 1936, Major Gordon returned to Father Tapper and the article "A Scotsman builds a chapel in Galilea" was published. The following year Major Gordon translated Alfons M. Scheider's book on mosaics into English. The book received the title: "Church of the Multiplying of the Loaves and Fishes at Tabgha, Lake of Galilee, and its Mosaics".

In 1939, Major Gordon returned with the Hellenic Travellers Club to the West Indies after fifty years. Cities such as Trinidad were unrecognisable, but when he arrived, a family member recognised him instantly and guided him through the island. While on the cruises of the Hellenic Travellers Club, Major Gordon made many new friends. Some of them pursued him to write and publish his memoirs. In 1939 he finally - although against his will - accepted, and the British writer Anna Masterton Buchan assisted him. The book was published in 1941 with the title: Culled from a Diary and contained a foreword of his good friend Lord Mottistone.

In the evening of 4 November 1940, a German enemy aeroplane threw several bombs on Piccadily Square. One of them hit the top floor of the In&Out Club where Major Gordon's brother William resided. The young servants rushed themselves out of the basement and freed the heavily wounded and pinned William together with Major A. Crozier. Major Crozier died not long after in hospital. William survived but his condition worsened until he succumbed to his wounds on March 10, 1941. He is buried at St. Alban's Churchyard in Hindhead. William's medals were donated by his daughter Valerie to the Gordon Highlanders museum in Aberdeen.

Major Gordon died peacefully on 12 August 1949 and found his quiet rest next to his wife in Logie Cemetery, Stirlingshire. The tombstone is close to the one of his father, mother and oldest sister. Major Gordon divided his belongings between his nephew, General Sir Cameron Gordon Graham Nicholson GCB, KBE, DSO & Bar, MC & Bar, the oldest son of his youngest sister, and his loyal cousin Colonel Ronald Eagleson Gordon MC. Ronald made sure that the lore of Major Gordon's family was passed down to his son Cyril Vivian Eagleson Gordon MC & Bar, who passed it down to his sons. Cameron Nicholson's brother Brigadier Reginald Arran Graham Nicholson gave some of his family's history to the Imperial War Museum in London.

== Autobiography ==
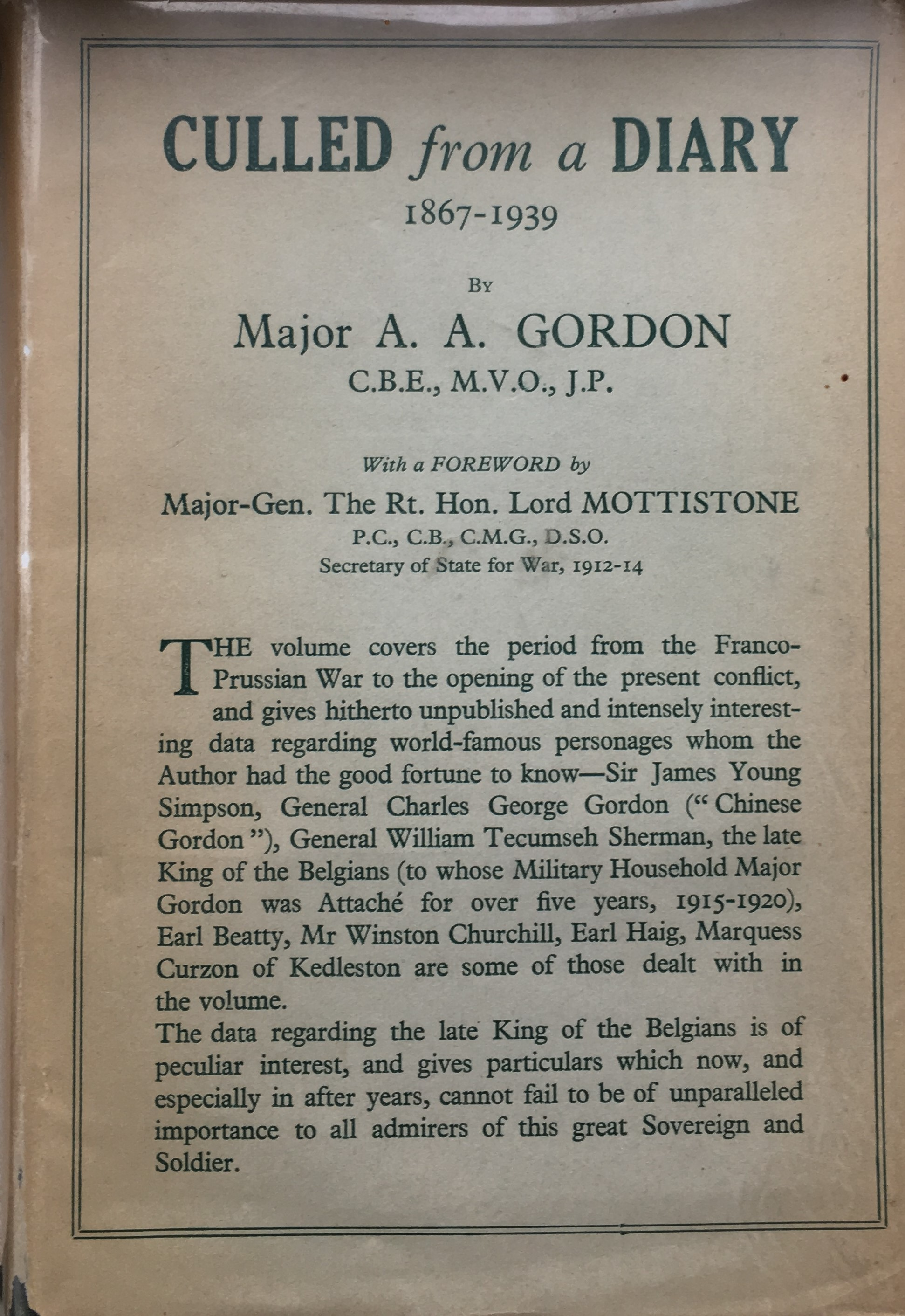
"Culled from a diary" – Boyd & Oliver – 1941

In 1941, Major Gordon published his memoirs, Culled from a Diary (1867–1939), published by Oliver and Boyd, with a foreword by his old friend Lord Mottistone.

Major Gordon explained in his preface that he wrote this book from brief diaries that he made at the time and not from memory. He also states that he penned these diary gleanings against his wishes and solely through pressure by certain prominent people, who urged him to leave a record of his events, because they would be of interest some day. He thanks the famous Miss Anna Buchan, who published under the pseudonym O. Douglas, for her contribution to the book. He also give thanks to Lord Mottistone who he served with in the Siege of Antwerp and who wrote the foreword of the book. Finally he also thanked Dom Ernest Graf, O.S.B. of Buckfast Abbey, Devon for his advice and encouragement, without which he might never have ventured in the field of authorship.

The book consists of 17 chapters and counts 206 pages.

== Honours ==
The following table shows the honours awarded to Gordon:

Commander of the Order of the British Empire (CBE)	(British) 24 August 1917
Member of the Royal Victorian Order (MVO)	(British) 4th class, 1908
Knight of Grace of the Venerable Order of Saint John (KStJ)	(Esquire 20 September 1898) (Knight of Grace 19 December 1900)
Officer of the Order of Leopold with Palm	(Belgium)
Commander of the Order of the Crown	(Belgium) 13 June 1919
Commander of the Order of Leopold II	(Belgium)
Officer of the Legion of Honour	(France) 16 January 1920
Officer of the Instruction Publique (Golden Palms)	(France)
member of the Order of Saint Anna	2nd Class (Imperial Russia)
Commander of the Order of the Crown of Italy	29 November 1918
Knight of the Order of Saint Jago	(Portugal)
Knight of the Order of Isabella the Catholic	(Spain)
1914 star and bar	(British Campaign medal)
British War Medal 1914-20	(British Campaign medal)
Victory Medal 1914-18	(British Campaign medal)
Coronation medal of King Edward VII	(British) 1902
Coronation medal of King George V	(British) 1911
Jubilee medal of King George V	(British) 1935
Coronation medal of King George VI	(British) 1937
Croix de guerre (Palms)	(Belgium) 31 July 1917
King Albert Medal	(Belgium) 18 August 1920
Queen Elisabeth Medal with Red Cross	(Belgium) 1918 – Major Gordon took part in the design of the medal
Civic Cross First Class (Swords and Bar)	(Belgium)
Croix de Guerre (Palms)	(France)
Medal of French Gratitude 'Silver'	(France) 3 December 1920

He was cited in Belgian and French Army Orders of the Day.

== The Major A. A. Gordon Society ==
In August 2019, the Major A. A. Gordon Society was established in Belgium. The society is the world's prominent international non-profit society that preserves the historical legacy of Major A. A. Gordon and his family. As an Anglo-Belgian society she maintains many national and international connections. The Society's website contains many details over Major Gordon and his family as well as the pictures of important artifacts in the King's Messenger Collection. One of these pieces is the dedicated portrait of King Albert I of Belgium to Major Gordon from 1921.

== General bibliography ==
- Record of the 9th [Volunteer] Battalion (Highlanders) The Royal Scots or The Raising of a Volunteer Regiment and its Conversion into a Full-Strength Battalion of the Territorial Force – James Fergusson – 1909
- Illustrated News London – 1915 – volume 56
- Kelly's Handbook to the Titled, Landed & Official Classes, volume 47 – 1921
- Mémorial du centenaire de l'ordre de Léopold 1832-1932
- Church of the Multiplying of the Loaves and Fishes at Tabgha, Lake of Galilee, and its Mosaics – Edited by A. A. Gordon – 1937
- Culled from a Diary – A. A. Gordon – Oliver & Boyd – 1941
- News from Belgium – 1942
- Eugène Ysaÿe et la musique de chambre by Michel Stockhem
- Women's Writing on the First World War (1999)
- The Dandy Ninth, a History of the 9th (Highlanders) Royal Scots by Neill Gilhooley – November 2019
