= William Eagleson Gordon =

Recipient of the Victoria Cross (1866–1941)

Colonel William Eagleson Gordon VC CBE
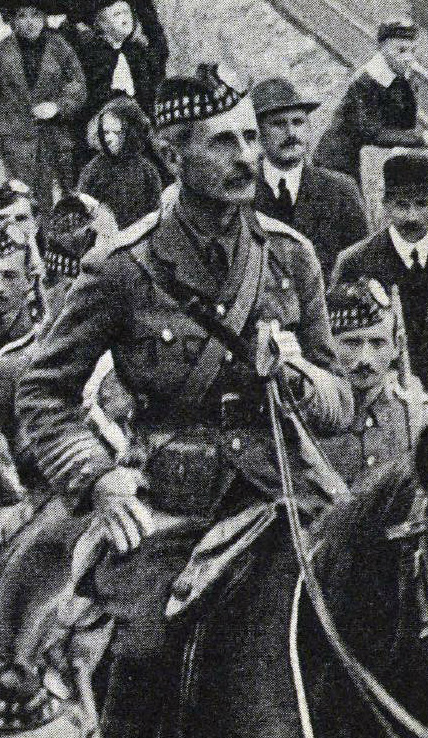
- Lieutenant Colonel W. E. Gordon (1914)
- Born: 4 May 1866; Bridge of Allan, Scotland
- Died: 10 March 1941 (aged 74); Hindhead, Surrey
- Burial place: St Alban's Churchyard, Hindhead
- Military career
- Allegiance: United Kingdom
- Branch: British Army
- Service years: 1886 – 1923
- Rank: Colonel
- Units: The Gordon Highlanders
- Conflicts: Chitral Expedition; Tirah Campaign; Second Boer War; World War I
- Awards: Victoria Cross; Commander of the Order of the British Empire

Colonel William Eagleson Gordon, VC, CBE (4 May 1866 – 10 March 1941) was a Scottish British Army officer and recipient of the Victoria Cross, the highest and most prestigious award for gallantry in the face of the enemy that can be awarded to British and Commonwealth forces. He is the older brother of Archibald Alexander Gordon, King's Messenger to King Albert I of Belgium.

== Early military career ==
Gordon was born at Bridge of Allan in 1866, and joined the militia in 1886 as lieutenant in the Royal Artillery. He was commissioned as a second lieutenant in the Gordon Highlanders on 6 June 1888, promoted to lieutenant on 1 September 1891, and took part in the Chitral Expedition with the 1st battalion of his regiment in 1895. Two years later they served in the Tirah Campaign on the North West Frontier of British India 1897–1898, during which he was promoted to captain on 19 October 1897.

He served as adjutant of the 1st battalion from 21 January 1899 and throughout the Second Boer War (1899–1902), when the battalion was posted to South Africa. They were part of the force sent to relieve the siege of Kimberley, and saw action at the Battle of Magersfontein in December 1899, where Gordon was wounded. He then served in the Orange Free State from February to May 1900, and took part in the battles of Paardeberg (February 1900), Poplar Grove, Driefontein (March 1900), Hontnek, Vet River and Hand River. Transferring to Transvaal, the battalion was again in action at Doornkop in May 1900, where they suffered severe losses, then took part in the battles of Belfast and Lydenburg (August 1900). The battalion stayed in South Africa throughout the war, which ended with the Peace of Vereeniging in June 1902. Four months later 475 officers and men of the 1st battalion left Cape Town on the SS Salamis in late September 1902, arriving at Southampton in late October, when the battalion was posted to Glasgow.

=== Citation ===
Gordon was 34 years old, and a captain in the 1st Battalion, The Gordon Highlanders during the Second Boer War when the following deed took place near Krugersdorp, South Africa for which he (together with Captain David Reginald Younger) was awarded the VC:

On the 11th July, 1900, during the action near Leehoehoek (or Doornbosch Fontein), near Krugersdorp, a party of men, accompanied by Captains Younger and Allan, having succeeded in dragging an artillery waggon under cover when its horses were unable to do so by reason of the heavy and accurate fire of the enemy, Captain Gordon called for volunteers to go out with him to try to bring in one of the guns. He went out alone to the nearest gun under a heavy fire, and with the greatest coolness fastened a drag-rope to the gun and then beckoned to the men, who immediately doubled out to join him in accordance with his previous instructions. While moving the gun, Captain Younger and three men were hit. Seeing that further attempts would only result in further casualties, Captain Gordon ordered the remainder of the party under cover of the kopje again, and, having seen the wounded safely away, himself retired. Captain Gordon's conduct, under a particularly heavy and most! accurate fire at only 850 yards range, was most admirable, and his manner of handling his men most masterly; his devotion on every occasion that his Battalion has been under fire has been remarkable.

His Victoria Cross is on display at the Gordon Highlanders Museum, Aberdeen, Scotland.

== Later military career ==
Gordon, promoted in January 1907 to major, was brevetted lieutenant colonel in the Gordon Highlanders in 1907. On 1 April 1908 he was made a deputy assistant adjutant general and quartermaster general (DAAQMG) of a Territorial Force (TF).

Gordon also served as an aide-de-camp to King George V, having been appointed to that position in October 1913.

On 4 May 1923 Gordon was placed on retired pay having achieved the rank of major although as previously noted he was a brevet lieutenant colonel.

Gordon died in retirement, as a result of enemy action during World War II, after being injured in a bombed-out house in London, at Hindhead, Surrey, in 1941 aged 74.

== Honours ==
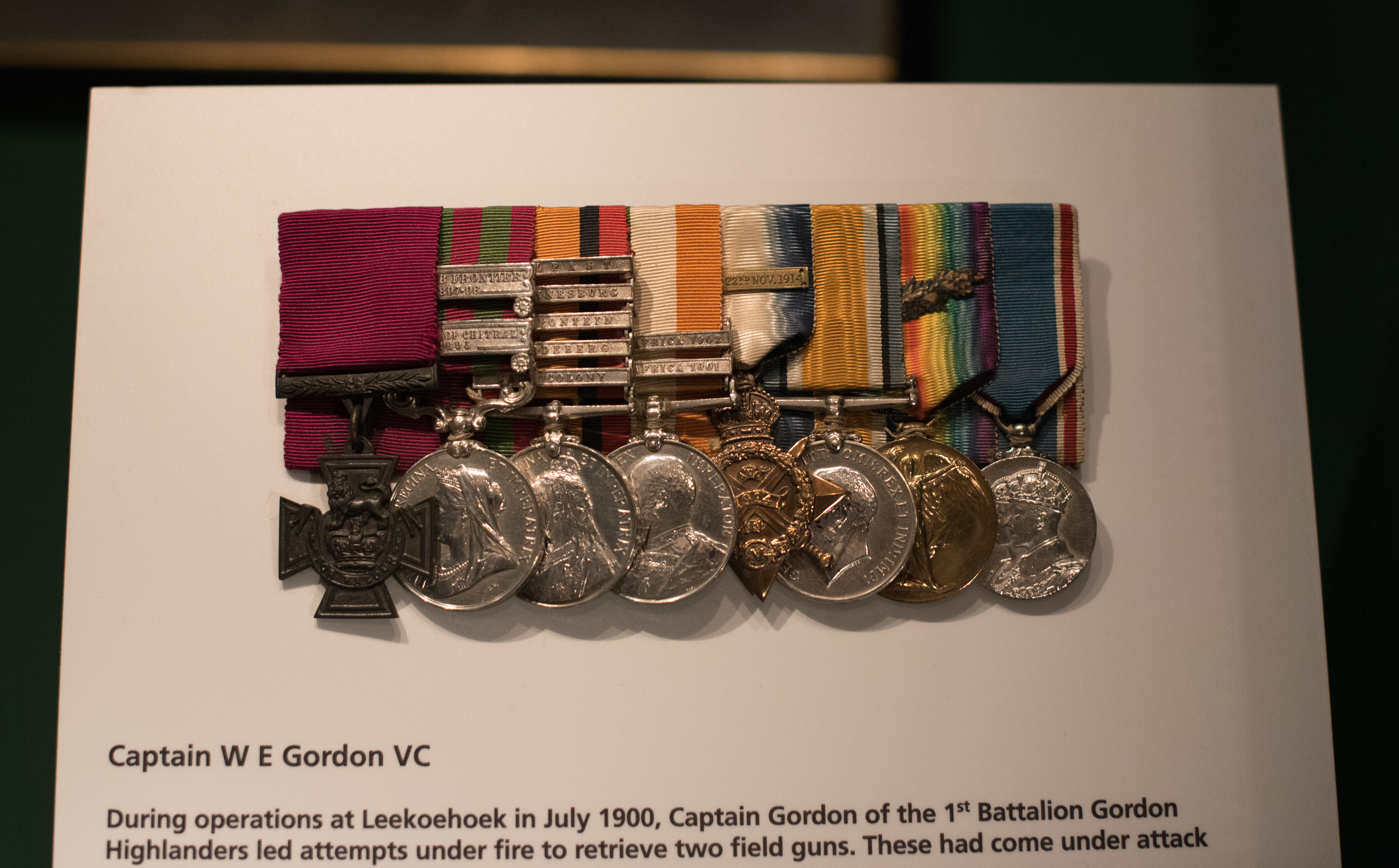
Gordon's medals displayed at the Gordon Highlanders Museum.

Ribbon	Description	Notes
	Victoria Cross (VC)	1900
	Commander of the Most Excellent Order of the British Empire (CBE)	
	India Medal	Clasps: Relief of Chitral 1895, Punjab Frontier 1897-98
	Queen's South Africa Medal	Clasps: Belfast, Johannesburg, Driefontein, Paardeburg, Cape Colony
	King's South Africa Medal	Clasps: South Africa 1901 and South Africa 1902
	1914 Star	Clasp: 5th AUG.–22nd NOV. 1914
	British War Medal	
	Victory Medal	With MID Emblem
	King George VI Coronation Medal	

== Arms ==
Coat of arms of William Eagleson Gordon

Notes
Confirmed 18 October 1901 by Sir Arthur Edward Vicars, Ulster King of Arms
Crest
On a wreath of the colours a dexter cubit arm vested paly Argent and Gules the hand grasping a scimitar Proper.
Escutcheon
Paly Argent and Gules three boars' heads erased Proper.
Motto
Dread God
