= Léon Londot =

Belgian painter (1876–1953)

Léon Londot (22 February 1876 – 15 June 1953), son of Emile Londot and Adolphine Auquier, was a Belgian painter and artist. His brother, Charles Londot (1 August 1886 – 1968) was also a painter.

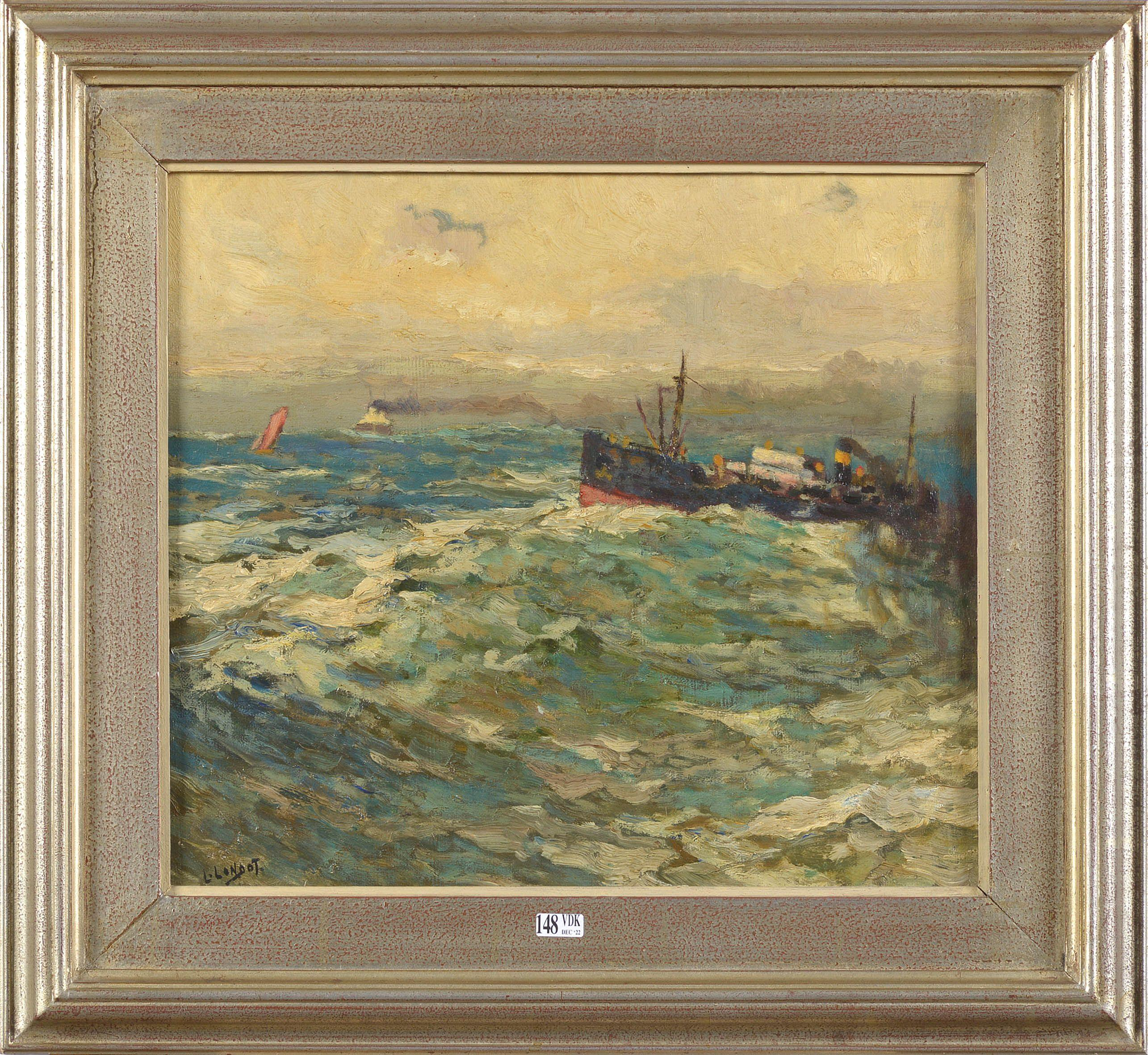
Huile sur toile by Léon Londot

He was a private teacher of Queen Elisabeth of Belgium.

== Honours ==
- 1932 : Commander in the Order of Leopold.
