= Jo Deman =

- Born: 2 June 1983; Leuven, Belgium

Jo Deman, from Leuven, Belgium served as one of the 12 elected members of the World Scout Committee, the main executive body of the World Organization of the Scout Movement for two consecutive terms. He was elected to the Committee at the 41st World Scout Conference in Baku, Azerbaijan in 2017, and online at the 42nd in 2021. He was the Vice-Chairperson of the Committee for the second term.

As a member of Scouts en Gidsen Vlaanderen, Deman had been East Brabant County Commissioner, later fulfilling several roles at European level.

Deman holds a master's degree in international politics from KU Leuven, and is an alumnus of Heilig Hartinstituut (School of the Holy Heart of Mary) in Heverlee. Professionally, he has worked for the European Youth Forum since 2011 as a membership and partnerships officer, and currently (2017) as a policy officer on Youth Work.

In August 2026, the World Scout Committee announced Deman as a Bronze Wolf Award recipient for his services to scouting.
