= Marie Depage =

Belgian nurse (1872–1915)

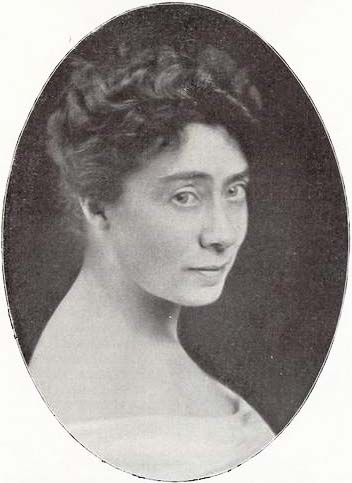
Marie Depage

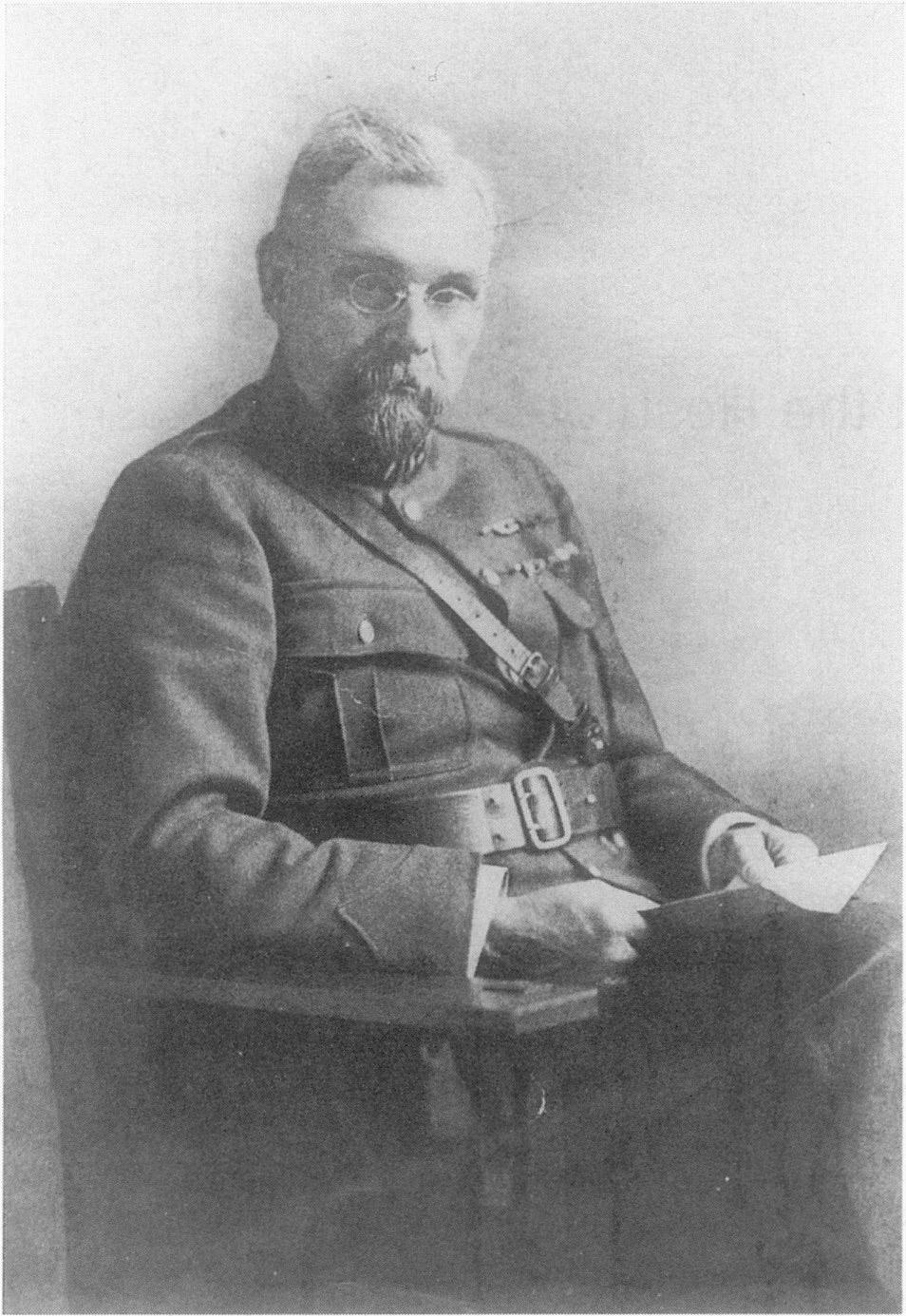
Dr. Antoine Depage

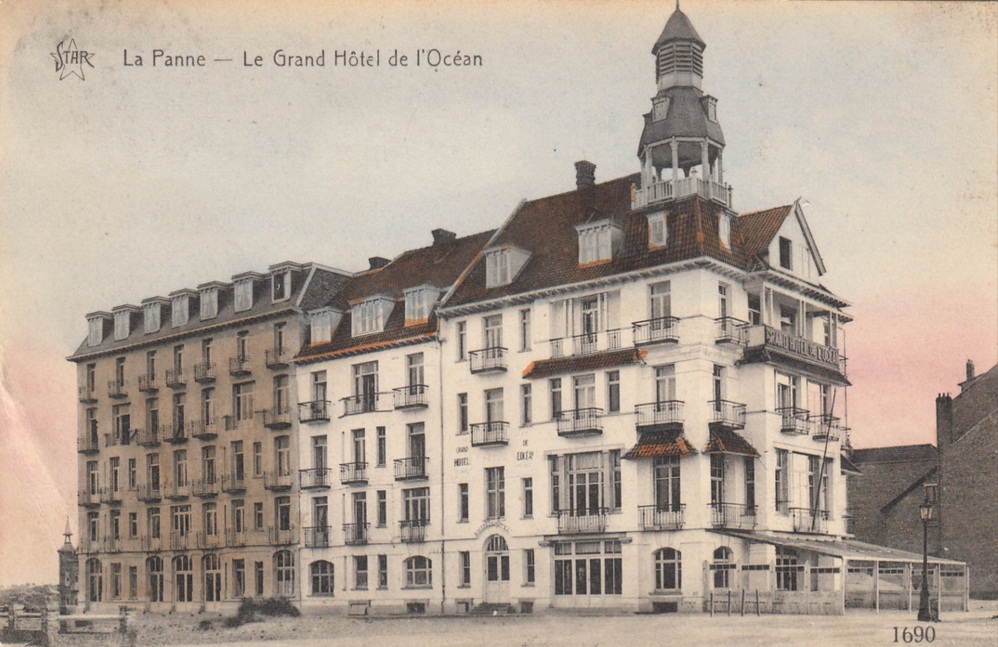
Grand hôtel de l'Océan in La Panne (Belgium) around 1904.

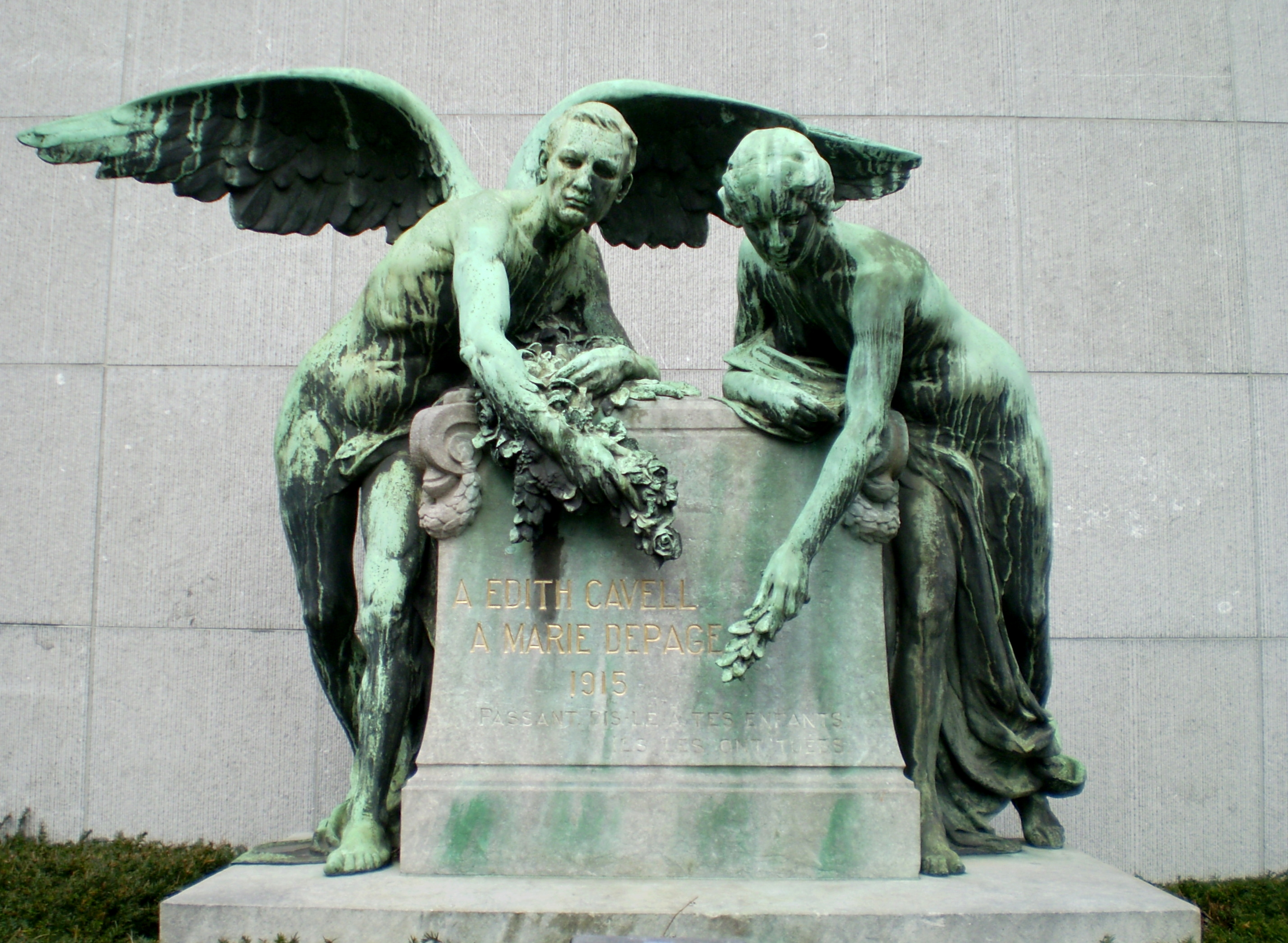
Monument to Edith Cavell and Marie Depage in Brussels

Marie Pauline Depage (née Picard; 23 September 1872 – 7 May 1915) was a Belgian nurse, and wife of Dr Antoine Depage, the Belgian royal surgeon and founder of the Belgian Red Cross. She was killed in the sinking of the RMS Lusitania by German submarine SM U-20, and she is commemorated in Belgium alongside the British nurse Edith Cavell.

== Early life ==
She was born Marie Pauline Picard, in Ixelles near Brussels in Belgium, one of two daughters and two sons of the engineer Désiré Émile Picard and Julie Marie Victorine Héger. She was a niece of Professor Paul Heger and granddaughter of Constantin Heger.

She married a Belgian doctor Antoine Depage on 8 August 1893. They had three sons.

Her husband was a surgeon to the Belgian King Albert, and chairman of the Belgian Red Cross. He was also a founder of the International Society of Surgery (Societe internationale de chirurgie) in 1902. Depage showed talent in drawing and painting; after studying human anatomy, she drew illustrations of her husband's surgical work.

Concerned at the antiquated nursing practice in Belgian hospitals run by nuns, Antoine Depage founded a laicised non-denominational medical institute in 1907, the Berkendael Medical Institute (also known as L'École Belge d’Infirmières Diplômées), in Uccle near Brussels, with Edith Cavell as head nurse. Marie Depage took on the administrative work. The couple were also involved in the introduction of Baden-Powell's scouting movement into Belgium in 1909–10, and Marie translated and published several of Baden-Powell's books.

== War work ==
With her husband and eldest son Pierre, also a surgeon, Depage organised sending four Belgian ambulances to the Balkans during the First Balkan War in 1912–13, accompanying the ambulance sent to a hospital in Constantinople.

After the outbreak of the First World War in 1914, Depage volunteered at the Red Cross hospital established at the Royal Palace in Brussels, and then helped her husband to convert the Grand Hôtel de l'Océan at De Panne (also known in French as La Panne) into a Red Cross hospital for military casualties, and organised surgical units to treat wounded soldiers of the Belgian Army near the Yser Front.

Depage travelled to the US in January 1915 to raise funds for the L'Océan hospital. After raising $100,000 in a few weeks, she received news that her middle son Lucien would be joining her eldest son Pierre at the front, and decided to return to Belgium. She booked passage on the RMS Lusitania, leaving New York on 1 May 1915 for Liverpool via Queenstown in the south of Ireland. The ship was torpedoed by German submarine U-20 at about 2:10 pm on 7 May 1915, and rapidly sank. Depage assisted other passengers to board lifeboats, and treated some injured on the deck of the sinking vessel. As the ship sank, she became entangled in ropes and drowned, one of nearly 1,200 killed from almost 2,000 aboard.

Depage's body was one of 289 recovered, and was buried by her husband in the sand dunes near La Panne. The funeral was attended by the King and Queen of the Belgians, Albert I and Elizabeth. Depage established the Institute Marie Depage near the Hospital de l'Ocean in her honour.

A memorial by Belgian sculptor Paul Du Bois was erected at Uccle in 1920, to commemorate the deaths of Depage and Cavell in 1915. Cavell had been convicted of treason and executed by occupying German forces in October 1915. An inscription on the monument reads "Passant, dis-le à tes enfants, ils les ont tuées" (French: "Passer-by, tell your children, they killed them"). The monument stands next to the Edith Cavell Hospital, at the intersection of Rue Edith Cavell and Rue Marie Depage.
