= Guides Catholiques de Belgique =

- Founded: 1915/1956
- Membership: about 23,000

Guides Catholiques de Belgique (GCB) is the French speaking Catholic Girl Guiding movement in Belgium, open to all from age five since 1979. In most sections it is girls-only, and it is active mainly in the Walloon region and Brussels.

GCB is a member of the GSB (French: Guidisme et Scoutisme en Belgique / Dutch: Gidsen- en Scoutsbeweging in België / German: Pfadfinderinnen und Pfadfinder in Belgien / English: Guiding and Scouting in Belgium), and it is a founding-member (1928) of the World Association of Girl Guides and Girl Scouts (WAGGS).

The Albanian Shoqata e Guidave dhe Skoutëve në Shqipëri Girl Guiding association's development is supported by the GCB and the Italian Associazione Guide e Scouts Cattolici Italiani.
