= Harold Parfitt (Scouting) =

First World War English pilot, correspondent, and founding Boy Scout (1881-1976)

26th Chief Minister of Boy-Scouts van België
- In office March 1949 – April 1951
- Preceded by: March Watson
- Succeeded by: Tom Tomega
- In office January 2, 1953 – January 8, 1954
- Preceded by: W.E. Anderson
- Succeeded by: March Watson

Personal details
- Born: 5 October 1881 Croydon, Surrey, England
- Died: 1 November 1976 (aged 95) Leeds, Yorkshire, England
- Spouse: Maude Campbell
- Children: 3

Harold Robert William Parfitt (5 October 1881 – 1 November 1976) was an English pilot and war correspondent during World War I as well as a founding member of The Boy Scouts. He was also a Scottish trade representative and served as Chief Scout of the Boy-Scouts van België.

== Biography ==
Parfitt was an organist in a Methodist church in Brussels, and created the first Scout group in Belgium, for British youth, at the end of 1908 or beginning of 1909, which interested several young people of Brussels. He then participated in the creation of the Boy-Scouts van België, trained the first members, and published the "Carnet du Boy-scout" translated and adapted from the Boy Scouts of America Scout Handbook in 1911.

In 1914, at the request of the government of the Ottoman Empire, he participated in the launch of Scouting in Turkey by founding the Izcilik Dernekleri. The organization was sponsored by the State organisation of the Ottoman Empire under the aegis of the Ministry of War, which saw it as a means of training young adolescents in military service. Membership was voluntary, and it was open to boys aged 11 to 17.
