= Les Scouts =

- Founded: 1912
- Website http://www.lesscouts.be/

Les Scouts – Fédération des Scouts Baden-Powell de Belgique or simply Les Scouts, formerly known as Fédération des Scouts Catholiques (FSC) and Fédération catholique des Scouts Baden-Powell de Belgique, is the largest Scout association in Belgium, both francophone and germanophone. It is open to all. Its last name change, dated 1 September 2008, intends to best reflect its commitment to spiritual development open to all. It was created in 1912 and is part of the Guidisme et scoutisme en Belgique. It is recognized by the World Organization of the Scout Movement (WOSM) and the Ministry of Youth of the French Community of Belgium.
