= Scouts et Guides Pluralistes de Belgique =

Scouting organization of Belgium

- Location: Avenue de la Porte de Hal, 39 - 1060 Bruxelles
- Country: Belgium
- Founded: December 23, 1910; 115 years ago
- Membership: 4500
- Président: François Jacquemin
- Website http://www.scoutspluralistes.be

Les Scouts et Guides Pluralistes de Belgique is a coeducational, nonreligious Scouting movement in French-speaking Belgium. This movement, known until 1992 as Fédération des Éclaireuses et Éclaireurs is the francophone branch after the split of the Boy-Scouts et Girl-Guides de Belgique (BSB-GGB) in 1966. Pluralist Scouts are officially recognized by the French Community in Wallonia-Brussels and are active members of the Council of the Conseil de la Jeunesse d’Expression française and the Confédération des Organisations de Jeunesse indépendantes et pluralistes (COJ).

== Branches ==
From 5 to 21 years old, young people are divided into different branches:

- Castors (Beavers), from 5 to 8 years old
- Louveteaux (Cubs), 8 to 12 years old
- Guides et scouts (Guides and Scouts), 12 to 15 years old
- Pionniers (Pioneers), 15 to 18 years old
- Clan, from 18 to 21 years old

== Uniform ==
The uniform of the pluralist Scouts is composed of a scarf with the colors of its unit and a gray shirt. Girls and boys wear the same uniform. For the bottom in general there is no set rule, but some troops insist on wearing shorts.

== Logo ==
The logo of the Scouts et Guides Pluralistes de Belgique is explained as:

- a youth, action movement
  - The girl and boy are moving
  - The blocks are oblique, not symmetrical and placed in an open framework sketched in pencil.
- boys and girls together
  - The characters form adapted
  - It is outside their scope, one to the other
- Scouting
  - The word Scout in letters
  - The neckerchief is the Scout subject par excellence
- specificity Pluralistic
  - The word "pluralism"! (This specificity is underscored by the assertive green label below)
  - The four different colours
