= Valdemārs Klētnieks =

Latvian author and Scout Commissioner

- Born: December 4, 1905; Vaive parish, Cēsis district, Latvia
- Died: August 17, 1968 (aged 62); Three Rivers, Michigan, U.S.
- Education: Latvian University
- Occupations: Author, Scouting official
- Writing career
- Period: 1925–1968
- Genre: Young adult literature
- Notable works: Fire in the Great Camp (1925); Vadītājs; rokas grāmata skautu vadītājiem (Latvian Scout Handbook, 1933); Pētījums par chronologijas problēmām Latvijā XVI-XX gadsimta (1947); Latviešu skautisma trīsdesmit gadi, 1917-1947 (1947); Latviešu skautisma četrdesmit gadi, 1917-1957 (1960); Senču raksti: latvju raksti bērniem (1963); Klintenieši: stāsts trimdas jauniešiem (1963)

Valdemārs Klētnieks (December 4, 1905 – August 17, 1968), also known as Voldemārs Klētnieks and Valdis Klētnieks, was a Latvian writer and national Scout Commissioner for Latvia before World War II. When the Soviet Union occupied Latvia in 1940, the Latvian Scout Organization was banned. Klētnieks eventually fled Latvia for a displaced persons camp in Germany, where he remained for five years following the end of World War II. In 1950, he settled with his wife and children as refugees in the United States, where he continued to write books in the Latvian language and joined the Boy Scouts of America national staff.

== The pre-war years ==
Klētnieks was born on December 4, 1905, in Vaive parish, a village in what was then the Cēsis district of Latvia, when that country was still part of Czarist Russia. During World War I, Latvian boys who had been evacuated to Tartu, Estonia, were introduced to Scouting there. Upon their return to Latvia in 1917, they formed the earliest Boy Scout troops in Latvia. Among them was Arvīds Brēdermanis, a future foreign service officer with the Latvian government. Klētnieks joined a newly formed Boy Scout troop soon after as a 13-year old. In 1924, he graduated from the Cesis Bērzaine State Secondary School (now the Cēsis State Gymnasium) and then began studies at Latvian University, eventually earning a degree in mathematics in 1942.

When Latvia gained its independence from Russia in 1920, the Latvian Scout Organization, Latvijas Skautu Organizācija, was established, led by Kārlis Goppers as president of the movement in the newly independent Baltic republic. Klētnieks began writing articles for the group's Latvian Scout magazine in 1925, soon after his graduation from secondary school. In 1928, he wrote a children's book, Fire in the Great Camp. He went to England in 1929, the birthplace of world Scouting, for Wood Badge advanced training for Scouting leaders at Gilwell Park. Upon his return, he was instrumental in introducing the Rover Scout program to Latvian Scouting. In 1933, he co-authored the Latvian Scout handbook, Vadītājs; rokas grāmata skautu vadītājiem, published in Riga. He also contributed to the Journal of the Latvian Institute of History, published in Riga in 1939. Klētnieks served as national Scout Commissioner and later executive director of the Latvian Scout Organization, alongside Kārlis Goppers as president. Klētnieks' wife served as head of the Latvian Girl Guides until both groups were forcibly disbanded in mid-1940 when Latvia lost its independence.

== The 1940s and World War II's aftermath ==
=== Occupation of Latvia and suppression of Scouting ===
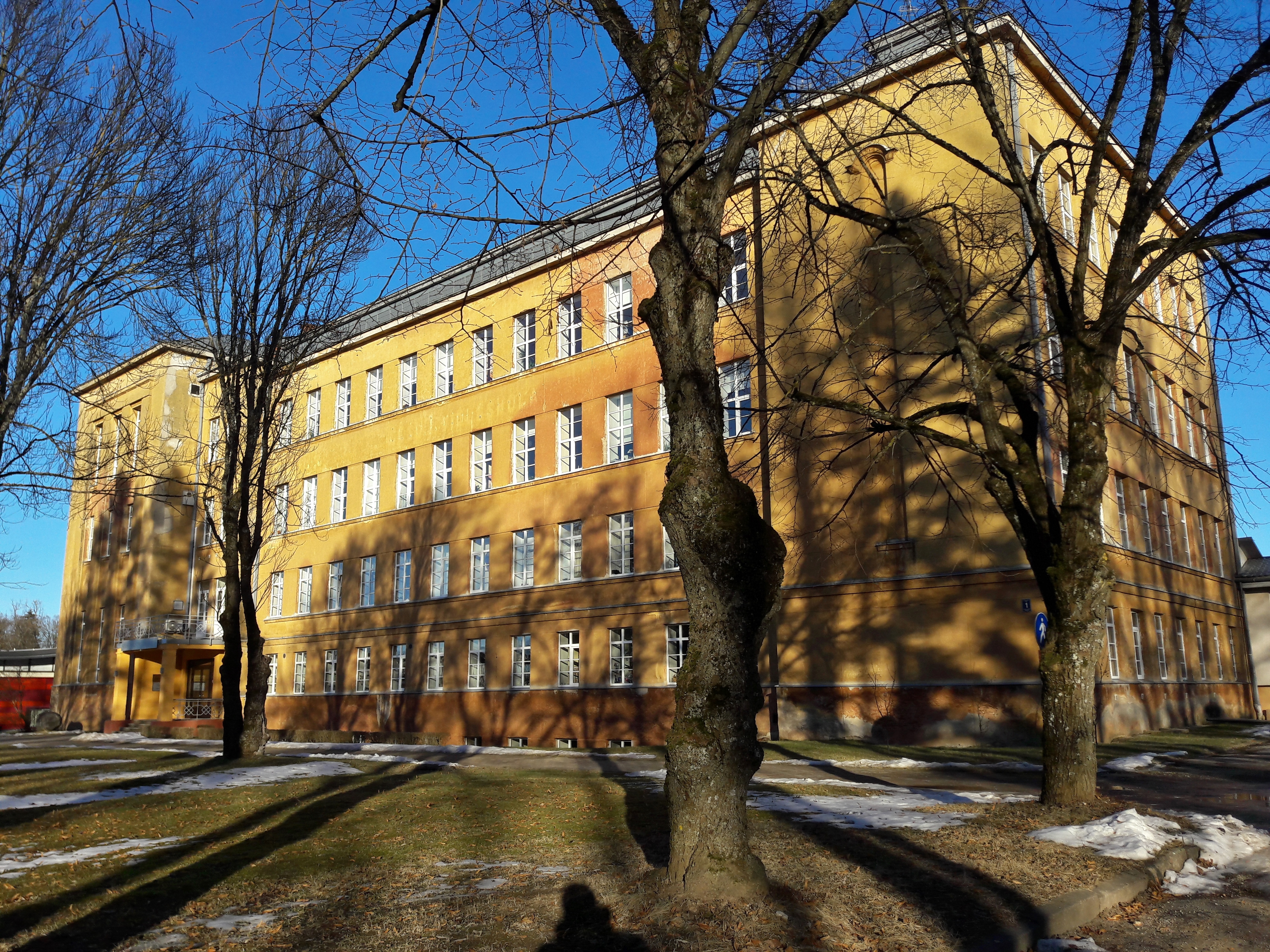
The Cēsis State gymnasium, where Klētnieks attended secondary school

In June 1940, the Soviet Union's occupation of Latvia took place. Scouting was suppressed and Klētnieks' Scout handbook was destroyed by communist agents appointed to abolish Scouting. A wave of arrests followed the Soviet takeover. "The Soviet repressive authorities regarded all organizations and parties of independent Latvia, including the Boy Scouts, as fascist or counterrevolutionary", concluded a University of Latvia study in 2005. The Latvian Scout president, Kārlis Goppers, was executed after a Stalinist show trial and Scouting went underground. Arvīds Brēdermanis was arrested as a spy and imprisoned in a Soviet gulag for fifteen years. With Scouting officially disbanded in Latvia, Klētnieks resumed his studies at Latvian University, earning a degree in mathematics in 1942. Between 1941 and 1944, Nazi Germany occupied Latvia during World War II, forcing Soviet withdrawal. By October 1944, the Red Army had regained control of most of Latvia, including its capital, Riga, and Klētnieks was in a German displaced persons camp. After the war ended, he remained at Camp Kathann near Hersbruck, in the American occupation zone of divided Germany. A former Nazi concentration camp, it was used for Latvian displaced persons in the postwar Latvian diaspora. Klētnieks served as Scout Executive-in-exile for the 4,000 Latvian Scouts there until 1950. While in Germany, he resumed writing, including magazine articles for fellow Latvian exiles and a book, Latviešu skautisma trīsdesmit gadi, 1917-1947 ("30 Years of Latvian Scouting, 1917–1947"), published in 1947. Also that year, his research into Latvian chronology issues from the 16th to the 20th centuries, Pētījums par chronologijas problēmām Latvijā XVI-XX gadsimta ("An examination of the problems of chronology in Latvia from the 16th to the 20th centuries"), was published.

=== In the United States ===
Klētnieks and his family went to the United States as refugees in May 1950, sponsored and given shelter by a Boy Scouts of America (BSA) official, E. Urner Goodman, at his Bondville, Vermont, summer home, Innisfree. Goodman was the BSA's National Program Director at the time, as well as the celebrated founder of the Order of the Arrow. While staying with the Goodmans, the Klētnieks family appeared at a Brattleboro, Vermont, church in December 1950, where they spoke of their wartime experiences as exiles and recalled Christmas in Latvia, singing the songs of their homeland to the delight of those who heard them. After Goodman's retirement from the BSA in 1951, Klētnieks remained at Innisfree to help in the running of his host's summer camp for boys. He also served as a local troop's Scoutmaster. In 1954, Klētnieks began working for the Boy Scouts of America, serving as a campmaster in Chicago and later as camping director at the BSA's National Training Center, located at the Mortimer L. Schiff Scout Reservation in New Jersey.

=== Postwar writings ===
As an émigré to the U.S., Klētnieks continued writing about Latvian history, including a second, expanded edition of his 1947 book, Latviešu skautisma trīsdesmit gadi, 1917-1947, published in 1960. The 414-page illustrated work, 40 Years of Latvian Scouting, 1917-1957, is a comprehensive history of the Scouting movement in Latvia during a turbulent period of two world wars, invasion, oppression, and exile. In the 1950s, he also wrote Ugunskurs ("Campfire"), a publication for Latvian exiles. Later, he wrote Klintenieši: stāsts trimdas jauniešiem ("The Klintins: a story for young people in exile") in 1963, about those who used their Scouting skills to survive in the forests of Latvia during the Soviet occupation of 1940–1941. He also wrote another book that year, Senču raksti: latvju raksti bērniem, about Latvian ancestral figures. It was re-published posthumously in Riga in 1990, after Latvia regained its independence from the Soviet Union and the present-day Latvian Scout and Guide Organization, Latvijas Skautu un Gaidu Centrālā Organizācija, was formed.

== Personal life and death ==
Klētnieks and his wife had three children: two daughters and a son. In the 1960s, they retired to Constantine, Michigan, where Klētnieks was a community leader at Garezers, a lake resort in nearby Three Rivers popular with Latvian-Americans. While building a campfire there, he was stricken by a heart attack and died on August 17, 1968. His grandson and great-grandson became active in American Scouting and, as of 2006, his daughter lived in Riga. Many of his documents and publications covering the Latvian Scout movement prior to 1940 as well as the postwar Latvian diaspora are now preserved at the Latvian State Archives. In 2012, his remains were reburied in Vaive parish, the place of his birth in Latvia.

== See also ==
- Scouting in displaced persons camps
