= International Scouter Association =

- Headquarters: Munich
- Founded: March 1947
- Founders: German Scouts and Scouts-in-exile

The International Scouter Association was founded during a Scout conference in March 1947 in Mittenwald. The founders were German Scouts and Scouts-in-exile. The seat was in Munich.

== See also ==
- Boy Scouts of the United Nations
- Scouting in displaced persons camps
- Non-aligned Scouting and Scout-like organisations
- World Friendship Fund
