= Interamerican Scout Region (World Organization of the Scout Movement) =

InterAmerican Scout Region

- Map of members or potential members of the Interamerican Scout Region, note several Pacific island chains are linked to the IASR through mainland political ties
- Owner: World Organization of the Scout Movement
- Headquarters: Ciudad del Saber, Panama
- Website https://www.scout.org/interamerica

The Interamerican Region is the divisional office of the World Scout Bureau of the World Organization of the Scout Movement, headquartered in Ciudad del Saber, Panama. The Interamerican Region services Scouting in the Western Hemisphere, both North and South America. Until the 1960s, the "Inter-American Scout Advisory Committee" serviced only Mexico, Central and South America, with Canada and the United States serviced through the then-named "Boy Scouts International Bureau" in Ottawa, Ontario, Canada. Even today, the Interamerican Region exists more for the benefit of countries south of the Rio Grande, as evidenced by the website being only in Spanish until 2011; consequently, the United States and Canada did not participate as vigorously in regional activities as do other national organizations around the world, however this is changing in the 2010s.

The headquarters of the Interamerican Region moved progressively southward from its inception until 2010, starting in Havana, Cuba, from 1946 to 1960; moving briefly to Kingston, Jamaica, in 1960; immediately relocating to Mexico City, Mexico, between 1960 and 1968; then to San José, Costa Rica, between 1968 and 1992; Santiago, Chile, from 1992 to 2010, most recently relocating to Ciudad del Saber, Panama.

The Scouts of the nations in the Caribbean basin host their own subregional jamborees.

The Interamerican Region contains one of the five countries with no Scouting organization, Cuba, due to political constraints within the country.

This region is the counterpart of the Western Hemisphere Region of the World Association of Girl Guides and Girl Scouts (WAGGGS).

== Regional Scouts administered directly by WOSM ==
The needs of Scout youth in the Region in unusual situations has created some interesting permutations, answerable directly to the World Scout Bureau. For years there was an active Boy Scouts of the United Nations with several troops at Parkway Village in New York City, with but 14 members in 1959. Also directly registered to the World Bureau were the 900 member International Boy Scouts of the Canal Zone.

== Interamerican Scout Committee ==
The Interamerican Scout Committee is the agency that directs and manages the Region based on the objectives, policies and lines of action established by the Interamerican Scout Conference.

The purpose of the committee is:

- Approve the Regional Plan.
- Acting as an advisory body of the World Scout Committee in matters relating to the Region.
- Stimulate, promote and support global, regional and subregional events in the Region.
- To act in the name and representation of the Interamerican Scout Conference between its sessions.

The committee is composed of eight elected members so that there is no more than one member of the same National Scout Organization. These members serve on a voluntary basis, serve three years in their positions. The Regional Director of the Interamerican Scout Organization is the Executive Secretary of the Committee.

Currently (2022 - 2025) the 10 members are:

Position	Name	Country
Chairperson	Rubem Tadeu Perlingeiro	Brazil
1st Vice-Chairperson	Jorge Arturo Leon	Mexico
2nd Vice-Chairperson	Meghan Pierson	United States
Member	Raúl Brusco	Uruguay
Member	Mark Chalouhi	Canada
Member	Pablo Nieto	Peru
Member	Lyda Pavón Avilés	Ecuador
Member	José Vargas	Bahamas
Youth Advisor	Miguel Ángel Calle Rodriguez	Ecuador
Youth Advisor	Matheus Vallois Serra	Brazil
President of the Interamerican Scout Foundation	Steve Kent	Uruguay
Regional Treasurer	Ajey Chandra	United States
Regional Director	Diana Carillo	Mexico

== Pan-American Region Scout Jamborees ==
The Region has run or sponsored region-wide jamborees in its member countries. Past Jamborees include:

- 1st Pan-American Jamboree – Rio de Janeiro, Brazil 1965
- 2nd Pan-American Jamboree – Asunción, Paraguay 1970
- 3rd Pan-American Jamboree – Bogotá, Colombia 1974
- 4th Pan-American Jamboree – Porto Alegre, Brazil 1981
- 5th Pan-American Jamboree – Kingston, Jamaica 1985
- 6th Pan-American Jamboree – Villarrica, Chile 1989
- 7th Pan-American Jamboree – La Calera, Colombia 1990
- 8th Pan-American Jamboree – Brazil 1992
- 9th Pan-American Jamboree – Cochabamba, Bolivia 1994
- 10th Pan-American Jamboree – Muxbal, Guatemala 1996
- 11th Pan-American Jamboree – Iguaçu Falls, Brazil 2001
- 12th Pan-American Jamboree – San Rafael, Argentina 2005
- 13th Pan-American Jamboree – Mexico, July 2010 (delayed due to concerns over the 2009 swine flu (N1H1) pandemic)
- 14th Interamerican Jamboree – Colombia January 4–12, 2013 (held concurrently with the 1st Interamerican Scout Camporee)
- 15th Interamerican Jamboree – Ecuador, 2017
- 16th Interamerican Jamboree – Iguaçu Falls, Brazil 2020

== Interamerican Scout Conferences ==
The Interamerican Scout Conference, the highest body in the Region, is made up of delegates from member National Scout Organizations (NSOs) and meets every three years.

The purpose of the Conference is:

- Stimulate the development of the Scout Movement in the Interamerican Region.
- Promote cooperation among member NSOs.
- Establish the objectives and basis of the Regional Policy.
- Ensure that the policies established by the World Organization of the Scout Movement are implemented in the Region.
- Elect the members of the Interamerican Scout Committee.

The World Scout authorities and observers from various governmental and non-governmental organizations, national and international, who have common interests with the Scout Movement, are invited to the Conference. Each NSO has the right to vote in the Conference sessions, and if one can not attend, the voting right can be given to another NSO.

=== List of Interamerican Scout Conferences ===
Year	Event	Dates	Location	Participating NSOs
1946	1st Interamerican Scout Conference	May 27 – June 2	Bogotá	19
1948	2nd Interamerican Scout Conference	May 3–8	Mexico City	11
1953	3rd Interamerican Scout Conference	February 20–25	Havana	16
1957	4th Interamerican Scout Conference	February 22–27	Rio de Janeiro	17
1961	5th Interamerican Scout Conference	February 22–27	Caracas	15
1964	6th Interamerican Scout Conference	August 26–29	Kingston	18
1968	7th Interamerican Scout Conference	July 24–29	San Salvador	24
1972	8th Interamerican Scout Conference	August 11	Lima	18
1974	9th Interamerican Scout Conference	August 5–9	Miami	25
1976	10th Interamerican Scout Conference	August 24–28	Mexico City	17
1978	11th Interamerican Scout Conference	June 5–9	Guatemala City	23
1980	12th Interamerican Scout Conference	October 10–19	Santiago	24
1982	13th Interamerican Scout Conference	July 25–31	Nassau	21
1984	14th Interamerican Scout Conference	September 4–8	Curitiba	22
1986	15th Interamerican Scout Conference	July 20–26	Port of Spain	22
1988	16th Interamerican Scout Conference	September 18–23	Buenos Aires	22
1990	17th Interamerican Scout Conference	September 18–23	Montevideo	17
1992	18th Interamerican Scout Conference	July 12–17	San José	27
1995	19th Interamerican Scout Conference	September 4–8	Cartagena	22
1998	20th Interamerican Scout Conference	March 22–27	Guadalajara	22
2001	21st Interamerican Scout Conference	September 24–28	Cochabamba	33
2004	22nd Interamerican Scout Conference	July 21 – August 4	San Salvador	30
2007	23rd Interamerican Scout Conference	November 23–28	Quito	25
2010	24th Interamerican Scout Conference	August 14–19	Panama City	
2013	25th Interamerican Scout Conference	September 14–21	Buenos Aires	
2016	26th Interamerican Scout Conference	October 24–28	Houston	29
2018	27th Interamerican Scout Conference	November 27–30	Panama City	28
2022	28th Interamerican Scout Conference	November 26	Ciudad del Este	

== Pan-American Moot ==
- 1st Pan-American Moot – Cochabamba, Bolivia, 27 December 2008 – 4 January 2009
- 2nd Interamerican Scout Moot – Tramandaí, Brazil, 27 December 2013 – 4 January 2014
- 3rd Interamerican Scout Moot – Cusco, Peru, 27 July 2018 – 8 August 2018

== Interamerican Leadership Training ==
The Interamerican Leadership Training (ILT) is a Leadership Training Course in the Interamerican Region of the World Organization of the Scout Movement. Sponsored by the Messengers of Peace program, the training course goals are to strengthen Scouting in IAR through a collaborative effort of sharing, networking, training, and support. The course is held once a year hosted by one of the National Scout Organizations (NSOs) of the Region. The selected NSO is awarded the rights to host the ILT two years in a row.

Year	Event	Location	Participating NSOs	Dates
2013	Pilot Interamerican Leadership Training	Camp Strake, Texas	32	December 26, 2013 - January 1, 2014
2014	2nd Interamerican Leadership Training	Galveston, Texas	32	December 27, 2014 - January 2, 2015
2015	3rd Interamerican Leadership Training	Guatemala City	30	December 28, 2015 - January 3, 2016
2016	4th Internamerican Leadership Training	Guatemala City	31	December 28, 2016 - January 3, 2017
2017	5th Internamerican Leadership Training	Quito		December 28, 2017 - January 4, 2018
2018	6th Internamerican Leadership Training	Quito		December 28, 2018 - January 4, 2019
2019	7th Internamerican Leadership Training	Panama City		December 26, 2019 - January 2, 2020
2020	8th Internamerican Leadership Training	Panama City		

== Youth of the Americas Award ==
The Youth of the Americas Award is the only award conferred by the Interamerican Scout Committee. The award is given to persons who have made an impact at the international level.

== See also ==
- Caribbean Scout Jamboree
- Interamerican Scout Jamboree
