= Scouting and Guiding in Latvia =

The Scout and Guide movement in Latvia is served by:

- Latvijas Skautu un Gaidu Centrālā Organizācija, member of the World Association of Girl Guides and Girl Scouts and of the World Organization of the Scout Movement
- Katoļu gaidu un skautu organizācija, candidate for membership within the Union Internationale des Guides et Scouts d'Europe
- some independent regional organizations

== See also ==
- Scouting in displaced persons camps
