= Johann Eberlin von Günzburg =

German theologian and reformer

Johann Eberlin von Günzburg (c. 1470 – 1533) was a German theologian and reformer who became prominent as the author of reformist flysheets and pamphlets.

== Life ==
Eberlin was born in c. 1470 in Kleinkötz in Bavaria. He studied theology in Ingolstadt and qualified in 1490 in Basel as Master of Arts. In Heilbronn he joined the Franciscan Order. From 1493 he was in Freiburg im Breisgau, from 1519 in Tübingen, where he was active as a preacher, and from 1521 in Ulm. Here he left the order and joined the Reformation movement. Eberlin was married in 1524, he had 4 children.

He studied in 1522 with Martin Luther and Philipp Melanchthon in Wittenberg and from 1523 worked in Basel and Rheinfelden. In 1524 he became a preacher in Erfurt and in 1525, spiritual adviser to Count Georg II von Wertheim. Here was created his translation of the Germania of Tacitus, the oldest German translation of the work. After the death of Georg II in 1530, Eberlin became curate of Leutershausen, where he died three years later.

== Works ==
- 15 Bundsgenossen, 1521
- Wider die Schänder der Kreaturen Gottes durch Weihen oder Segnen, 1521
- Der 7 frommen, aber trostlosen Pfaffen Klage, 1521
- Mich wundert, daß kein Geld im Land ist, 1524
- Wie sich ein Diener Gottes Worts in allem seinem Tun halten soll, und sonderlich gegen die, denen das Evangelium zuvor nicht gepredigt ist, daß sie sich nicht ärgem, 1525
- Eine getreue Warnung an die Christen in der Burgauischen Mark, sich auch füro zu hüten vor Aufruhr und falschen Predigern, 1525
