= World Friendship Fund =

- World Friendship Fund
- Website www.scouting.org/international/resources/22-329/

The World Friendship Fund is a major endowment fund of the Boy Scouts of America developed during the closing days of World War II, the answer of Scouting to the Marshall Plan, to rebuild Scouting in nations that had been wracked by war.

Through the Fund, voluntary contributions of Scouts and leaders are used for cooperative projects that help Scouting associations in every nation that has Scouting, those nations that had Scouting before and those newly emerging nations that desire Scouting for their youth, to strengthen and extend their Scouting programs.

Since the beginning of the Fund, more than US$ 11 million has been donated to these self-help activities.

== Juliette Low World Friendship Fund ==
The Girl Scouts of the USA maintains a similar project, known as the Juliette Low World Friendship Fund (JLWFF). Juliette Gordon Low was committed to offering Girl Scouting to girls around the globe. The GSUSA created the Fund in 1927. Donations are used to support girls' international travel and participation in training and international events.

Donations also support the World Thinking Day Fund, to encourage the development of Girl Guiding/Girl Scouting in newly emerging nations.

At the 7th World Conference in Poland in 1932, a Belgian delegate suggested that all Girl Guides and Girl Scouts give a penny for their thoughts. The Thinking Day fund was started to help where the need was greatest.

Similar Scouting friendship funds include the Baden-Powell World Fellowship, a major endowment fund of the World Scout Foundation for ongoing support of the World Organization of the Scout Movement and the United States Fund for International Scouting, as well as the Order of the Condor, an endowment program of the WOSM-InterAmerican Region.

== See also ==
- Boy Scouts of the United Nations
- Scouting in displaced persons camps
