= Sarstedt =

- Town
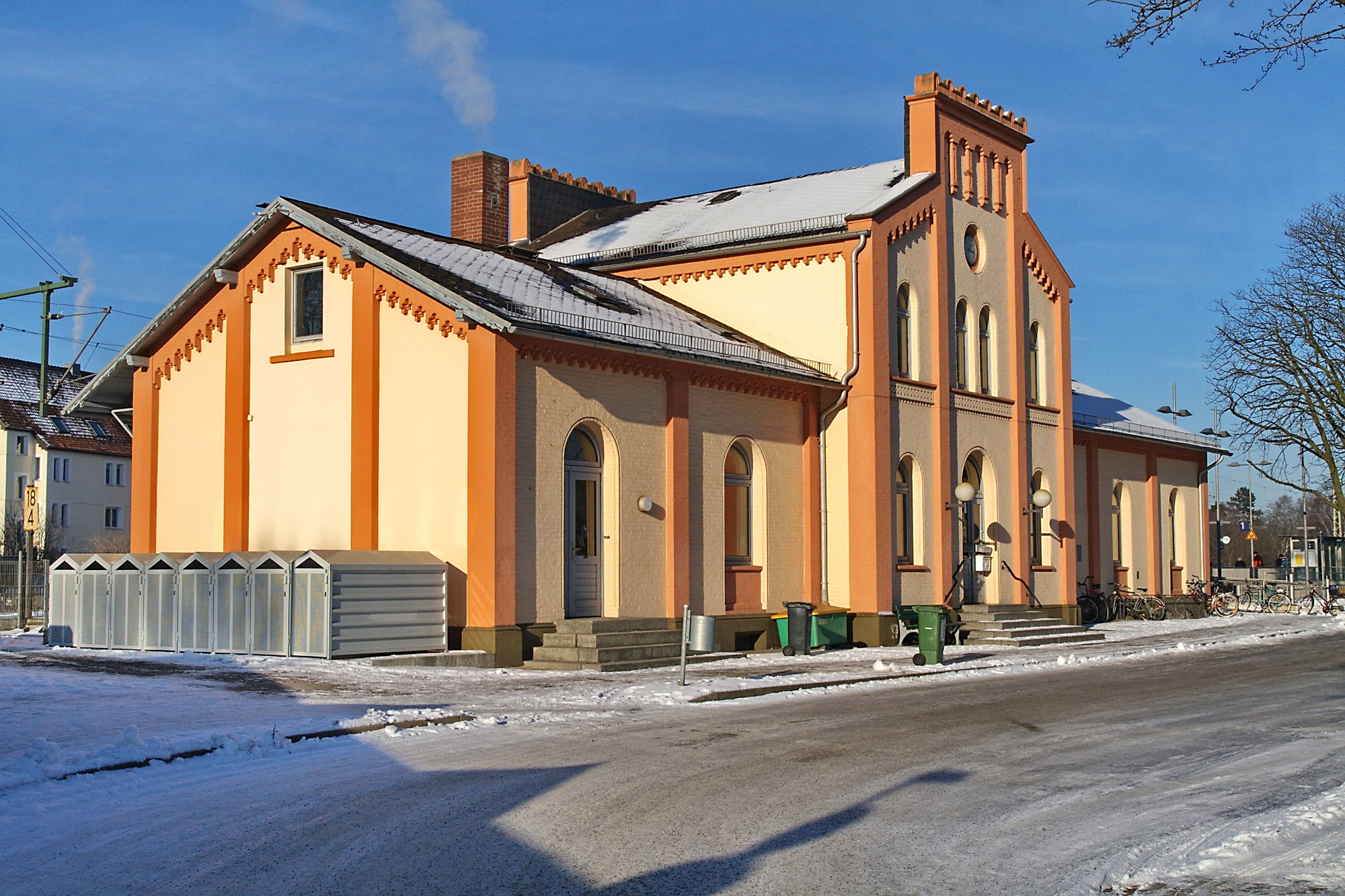
- Train station

- Coat of arms

- Location of Sarstedt within Hildesheim district
- Interactive map of Sarstedt
- Location within Germany Location within Lower Saxony
- Coordinates: 52°14′22″N 9°51′38″E
- Country: Germany
- State: Lower Saxony
- District: Hildesheim

Government
  - Mayor (2021–26): Heike Brennecke (SPD)

Area
  - Total: 43 km^{2} (17 sq mi)
- Elevation: 64 m (210 ft)

Population (2025-12-31)
  - Total: 19,483
  - Density: 450/km^{2} (1,200/sq mi)
- Time zone: UTC+01:00 (CET)
  - Summer (DST): UTC+02:00 (CEST)
- Postal codes: 31157
- Dialling codes: 05066
- Vehicle registration: HI
- Website: www.sarstedt.de

Sarstedt (German pronunciation: [ˈzaːɐ̯ʃtɛt]) is a town in the district of Hildesheim, Lower Saxony, Germany. It has approximately 18,500 inhabitants. Sarstedt is situated 20 km south of Hanover and 10 km north of Hildesheim. Sarstedt station is on the Hanoverian Southern Railway and is served by the Hanover S-Bahn.

The GEO 600 gravitational wave detector is located nearby.

The former independent municipality Giften has been a part of Sarstedt since 1 March 1974.

== Mayor ==
The mayor of Sarstedt is Heike Brennecke (SPD). She was elected in September 2014, and re-elected in 2021. The predecessor was Karl-Heinz Wondratschek (SPD).

== Paleontology ==
Sarstedt comprises several geologic formations. The site where hominin remains were discovered is the Liene river flats, a large site with a thin Holocene layer that overlies a thicker layer dating to the Saale glaciation, with an Upper Cretaceous layer underlying the Pleistocene layer. The Mesozoic stratum is referred to as the Santon Formation. Large Pleistocene-aged warm period fauna from Sarstedt include Hippopotamus, Cervus elaphus, and Elephas antiquus.

=== Neanderthals ===
In 2001, three skull fragments were reported to have been discovered by amateur fossil collectors Otrud and Karl-Werner Frangenberg from the locality. Of the fossils are the somewhat complete temporal Sarstedt I (Sst I), the occipital fragment Sarstedt II (Sst II), and the left parietal fragment Sarstedt III (Sst III). They were discovered on the surface of sand pits on the western end of the village; the first fossil was found on January 2, 1999, the second on November 8, 1997, and the final on October 30, 1999. Sst I was discovered in matrix aged anywhere from 115-58 ka, while Sst II is embedded in older matrix suggesting an older date.

Sarstedt I is determined to be a young girl between 2 and 4 years of age based on the inner anatomy and development of the auditory canal. As well, the mastoid is consistent with Ehringsdorf and Krapina, other Neanderthal fossils. Sarstedt II exhibits a generalized suite of characters that are common in Neanderthals. Sarstedt III has arterial impressions that are only found in hominins ancestral to Homo sapiens. Additionally, the curvature of the specimen is very unlike Homo neanderthalensis. Overall, the specimens have anatomy that derives away from Neanderthals, though the inclusion of Sst I in Homo erectus or an ancestral phase of Neanderthals definitely unwarranted. However, Czarnetzki, Gaudzinski-Windheuser, and Pusch (2001) suggest that further testing is required to affirm this classification.

=== Technology ===
While the Frangenberg brothers did retrieve the human fossils, their collection also includes stone tools discovered over three years. They are handaxes, scrapers modified on both faces, and discoidal cores that are commonly associated with the Middle Pleistocene. They are made from grey flint, all with varying degrees of patination and gravel contusions, which suggests that the tools underwent differing taphonomic processes that makes it unclear if they represent one assemblage or a series of staggered "off-site" activities. Otherwise, it is not known how the lithics correspond with the age of the human fossils.

== Famous people from Sarstedt ==
- Jean-Henri Pape (1789-1875), a distinguished French maker of pianos and harps
- Walter Mahlendorf (born 1935), athlete, team gold medallist in the 4x100m at the 1960 Summer Olympics
- Rudolf Schenker, (born 1948), rhythm guitarist, main songwriter and founding member of hardrock band Scorpions
- Harald Grosskopf (born 1949), musician, drummer of the Sarstedter Beatband 'The Stuntmen' 1965 to 1966
- Marianne Bachmeier (1950-1996), she shot the suspected murderer of her daughter Anna Bachmeier in a court room in Lübeck in 1981
- Michael Schenker, (born 1955), virtuoso guitarist from UFO, Scorpions and Michael Schenker Group, younger brother of Rudolf Schenker
