= Kleinkötz =

Village in Bavaria, Germany

Coordinates: 48°25′N 10°18′E

Kleinkötz is a village near Günzburg in Bavaria in Germany, the site of a post World War II American sector displaced person camp (see also Scouting in displaced persons camps). It is the birthplace of Johann Eberlin von Günzburg.
