= Interamerican Scout Jamboree =

The Interamerican Scout Jamboree is the biggest event of the Interamerican Scout Region. It is held every four years in a different country of the region. The host country is elected during the Interamerican Scout Conference. Ecuador was announced as the host of the 15th Interamerican Scout Jamboree at the XXV Interamerican Scout Conference in Buenos Aires, Argentina, on 21 September 2013.

== List of Interamerican Jamborees ==
Year	Event	Location	Country	Name/Theme	Dates	Attendance	Nations
1965	1st Pan-American Jamboree	Rio de Janeiro	Brazil				
1970	2nd Pan-American Jamboree	Asunción	Paraguay				
1974	3rd Pan-American Jamboree	Bogotá	Colombia	Integration	January 4–11, 1974		
1981	4th Pan-American Jamboree	Porto Alegre	Brazil				
1985	5th Pan-American Jamboree	Kingston	Jamaica				
1989	6th Pan-American Jamboree	Villarrica	Chile	Astral Jamboree - Southern Dreams			
1990	7th Pan-American Jamboree	La Calera	Colombia	Jam Am - Americas Jamboree			
1992	8th Pan-American Jamboree	Tramandai	Brazil	Columbus Jamboree. 500th year of the Discovery of the Americas			
1994	9th Pan-American Jamboree	Cochabamba	Bolivia		December 29, 1994: January 4, 1995		
1996	10th Pan-American Jamboree	Muxbal	Guatemala		May 30 - April 6, 1996		
2001	11th Pan-American Jamboree	Iguazu Falls	Brazil	Starting with Joy	January 7–12, 2001	8,000	
2005	12th Pan-American Scout Jamboree	San Rafael	Argentina	One Continent, One Hope	January 8–16, 2005	7,000	
2008	13th Pan-American Scout Jamboree	Cuzco	Peru			Canceled	
2010	13th Pan-American Scout Jamboree	Tepoztlán	Mexico	JamPan 2010 - The Adventure of the Fifth Element / Explore Our Territory, Discover Your Spirit	July 10–18, 2010	1,523	13
2013	14th Interamerican Scout Jamboree	Mosquera	Colombia	JamCam 2013 - I Live My Own Adventure / Rediscovery of the Americas	January 3–12, 2013	3,260	23
2017	15th Interamerican Scout Jamboree	Guayaquil	Ecuador	JamCam 2017	December 27, 2016: January 2, 2017		
2020	16th Interamerican Scout Jamboree	Foz do Iguaçu	Brazil	JamCam 2020	January 4-10, 2020		
2025	17th Interamerican Scout Jamboree	Cali	Colombia	Americas United for Peace	December 27, 2025 - January 2, 2026		

== 13th Pan-American Scout Jamboree ==
=== Peru 2008 ===
The 13th Pan-American Scout Jamboree would have taken place in the Cuzco, Peru, in the vicinity of the famous architecture of Machu Picchu. The Association of Scouts of Peru sent a letter to retiring itself as the South American Jamboree host to "avoid paperwork" and "problems". Throughout the 12th Pan-American Scout Jamboree Argentina 2005 and 2006 Peru promoted the 13th Pan-American Scout Jamboree in Peru.

=== JamPan 2009 reschedule ===
It was decided to postpone the 13th Pan-American Scout Jamboree to be held in Mexico during December 2009, to avoid the risks by the outbreak of H1N1 influenza at the time.

=== JamPan 2010 venue change ===
The Organizing Committee of 13th Pan-American Scout Jamboree made the decision to change the venue of the event, to be held from July 10 to 18 2010, from Alameda Park 2000, located in the City of Toluca, in the state of Mexico, to the Scout Training Camp "Meztitla" located in the town of Tepoztlan, in the state of Morelos.

This decision was made based on the following aspects, which were duly tested:

- The place that had been arranged for the JamPan, Alameda Park 2000, is a public park that is adjacent to the Mexiquense Cultural Center. This place would be closed for the conduct of the JamPan since the last week of the year and the first of the new year, the number of visitors decreases considerably. But for new dates of the JamPan, the park can not be locked for the JamPan, which makes the place unsuitable for security and logistics. The same applies to Sierra Morelos Park, which would be some JamPan activities.
- Mexiquense Cultural Center, next to Alameda Park 2000, had offered their facilities to conduct it records JamPan various cultural activities as scheduled originally, but the CCM conducts summer courses for children so can not pay its facilities in the new dates set for the JamPan.
- The Scout Training Camp "Meztitla" is an hour away from Mexico City, in Tepoztlan. The place is owned by the Scout Association of Mexico, AC (ASMAC), who manages it. That is why to use it, they only had to notify the address. Meztitla has hosted several National, Regional and Global Scout Events. It has the necessary infrastructure for the JamPan and institutional support from the ASMAC The municipal government also supports this field events in schools and already has contacts with the state government.

=== JamPan 2010 theme song controversy ===
The official song for the JamPan 2010 was "Discover Your Spirit". The song was sung by Nudo, a Scout band from Mexico. After appearing in various events organized by the ASMAC, Nudo was excluded from participating in the JamPan 2010, where they were scheduled to do a presentation to the participants during the opening ceremony, without explanation involved.

== 14th Interamerican Scout Jamboree/1st Interamerican Scout Camporee ==
=== Event name change and event separation ===
Originally this event was called "Pan-American Scout Jamboree", where countries of Latin America and the Caribbean were regular participants, but the Interamerican Scout Committee decided to change the name to "Interamerican Scout Jamboree" for including USA and Canada in this event, In the preview year, these countries were invited.

Usually, Scouts from 11 to 15 years of age had a special program during the Pan-American Scout Jamborees, but after the 2010 Interamerican Scout Conference, the Interamerican Scout Committee decided to separate the events and create the "JamCam". Scouts were placed in the Camporee, and Venturers in the Jamboree, both with similar programs and held in the same venue. JamCam will be the new promotional name for the Interamerican Scout Jamboree and Camporee, replacing the JamPan, which stood for "Jamboree Panamericano", Spanish for Pan-American Scout Jamboree.

=== JamCam 2013 venue change ===
The JamCam 2013 was planned to be held in "La Florida" Park, located in Bogotá, Colombia. This park hosted the 3rd Pan-American Jamboree. By-law of the District Government as to the use of public space, the IDRD told the JamCam 2013 Organizing Committee in December 2012 that it was confirmed that "La Florida" Park would host the Jamboree and the Camporee, but they left the park open to the general public income. This puts at risk the logistical, administrative and security of the events.
