= Skolta Esperanto Ligo =

Esperanto Scouting association

Skolta Esperanto-Ligo
- Website http://www.esperanto.org/skolta/

The Skolta Esperanto Ligo (SEL) brings together Esperanto-speaking Scouts from all over the world.

== Origin ==
The third World Esperanto Congress was held in 1907 in Cambridge, England. It is probable that Lord Baden-Powell was aware of the proceedings. After the first Scout camp which at Brownsea later that year, Baden-Powell was writing his book Scouting for Boys covering the method in which Scouting could be adapted to youth. This work appeared in the form of six small booklets, published every two weeks. The first of the series appeared on January 15, 1908, and the series had so much success that in May of the same year, the set was published in the form of a unified book. In the third book of the series, Baden-Powell advised the Scouts as recourse to use the international language Esperanto as a "secret language of the patrol". The passage in question disappeared in some later editions, however one could read on page 202 of Scouting for Boys, in the original version:

Membership card

"Also if you want to use a secret language in your patrol, you should all set to work to learn "Esperanto". It is not difficult, and is taught in a little book costing one penny. This language is being used in all countries so that you would be able to get on it abroad now."

The fact that Baden-Powell mentioned Esperanto in Scouting for Boys is interesting in that Baden-Powell held Esperanto in regard and that he had spoken about it with his wife, Lady Olave Baden-Powell. Indeed, after B-P's death, in a 1950 letter to Mrs. Dr. Lydia DeVilbis, Lady Olave wrote "I often thought that it would be splendid if Mrs. Roosevelt could convince the United States to make Esperanto accepted in the whole world and to introduce it into the programs of all schools and organizations. It would really be of the highest importance for the world and especially useful for good understanding between people who are divided because of the diversity of languages." Mrs. Roosevelt was, at the time of this letter, president of the Committee of Human Rights of the United Nations. This perhaps helped prepare the ground for recommendations of UNESCO in favor of Esperanto proclaimed in 1954 and 1985.

Following the immediate spread of Scouting in 1907, it soon became apparent to many that the Scouts might really be able to succeed at the experiment of international fraternity. Alexander William Thomson, leader of an English troop, had the idea on a French battlefield in 1918 to found an international Esperanto speaking Scouting organization to support international friendship and exchange of services. In order to cure the linguistic problems, he recommended Esperanto as an international means of communication. The same year saw the foundation of the League of Esperanto-speaking Scouts as an international Scout organization, which thus predates the World Organization of the Scout Movement, though not the Order of World Scouts from 1911. Much is unknown about what Baden-Powell thought of Esperanto, but he liked the idea of an international Scout organization; two years later, in 1920, the World Bureau of Scouting was founded, however without using Esperanto, having English and French as official languages.

A.W. Thomson became president of the League of Esperanto-speaking Scouts, and his brother K. Graham Thomson the Secretary of Honor. Thereafter, Norman Booth, another British Scoutmaster became secretary-general of honor and seceded with treasurer D.H. David to organize the Skolta Esperanto Ligo (SEL). This new association organized multiple international Scout camps to achieve its goals and to test the use of Esperanto in Scouting: in 1922 in the Netherlands, 1923 in Belgium, 1924 in Denmark, 1925 in Spain, 1926 in Czechoslovakia (there were even radio broadcasts in Prague about Scouting in Esperanto), 1927 in Spain, 1928 in Belgium, 1929 during the World Jamboree in England, 1930 in the Netherlands, a camp in which participated a SEL member, Harold Wilson, who would become Prime Minister of the United Kingdom from 1964 to 1970 and again from 1974 to 1976). Almost 100 Esperanto speaking Scouts from 18 countries, as far away as Japan, took part in the 1929 World Jamboree in Birkenhead.

== Modern era ==
On August 22, 1969, the Skolta Esperanto Ligo officially presented the first Esperanto-language Scout book, "Ĵamborea Lingvo" (the Jamboree's Language), to members of the World Scout Conference held in Helsinki, Finland. A new version appeared in 1995.

"La Skolta Mondo" is the official bulletin of the SEL.

== See also ==
- Boy Scouts of the United Nations
