= Scout Commissioner =

- Commissioner badge of Scouts BSA
- Created: 1907

In the Scout Movement, a commissioner is the volunteer whose role it is to deliver a Scout association's programs and support Scouting's units, usually within a particular geographic area. Commissioners are the volunteers who work with Scout Executives. In some Scout associations, the term Executive Commissioner is used to refer to a paid staff member

== History ==
The commissioner role appeared early in the Scouting movement. Individual troops were organized by existing community organizations, and those organizations took the primary responsibility for implementing the Scouting program. To ensure consistency between different troops, the Scouting movement relied on two concepts: leader training and the commissioner staff. Scouting's founder, Baden-Powell, developed and promoted numerous leader training programs, starting in 1910 and leading to a course in 1919 that is now known as Wood Badge. The commissioner staff provided an ongoing, independent check on the troops themselves.

National commissioners such as Valdemārs Klētnieks (1905 – 1968), for example, introduced Wood Badge training in Latvia to the Latvian Scout Organization in the 1930s and developed the handbook for Latvian Scouts. After the Soviet Union occupied that Baltic country and crushed Scouting in 1940, he eventually revived the Latvian Scouts in exile at a displaced persons camp in Germany following the end of World War II.

In the Barbados, national commissioner Trevor Jones led the Barbados Boy Scouts Association in coping with the significant impact of the worldwide COVID-19 pandemic on the Caribbean island nation's scouting programs in 2020. He explained to The Barbados Advocate that online virtual meetings and training courses were provided during the lockdowns. Similarly, Sarfaraz Qamar Dar, the Chief Commissioner of the Boy Scout Association of Pakistan, emphasized the role played by Scouts during the pandemic while continuing to promote community services. In March 2020, he welcomed the President of Pakistan, Arif Alvi, to the Scouts' "Clean and Green Camporee," which had as its emphasis the campaign against deforestation to achieve the goal of sustainable development.

== Title ==
A commissioner's full title is derived from their level within the organization:

- Unit Commissioner
- Area Commissioner
- Camp Commissioner
- District Commissioner
- Council Commissioner
- Regional Commissioner
- Provincial Commissioner
- National Commissioner
- International Commissioner
- Chief Commissioner

Sometimes commissioners have responsibility for a specific topic, such as Commissioner for Camping, District Roundtable Commissioner, or Deputy Commissioner for Wolf Cubs. Some commissioners also have assistants, such as the Assistant District Commissioner. The Unit (or Neighborhood) Commissioner is intended to be the primary contact between the Scout organization and the unit leadership. This is accomplished by the unit commissioner periodically visiting the unit and serving as the link with the District and Council. In a 1960 study by the University of Michigan measuring various aspects of Scouting in the U.S., approximately two-thirds of Scoutmasters surveyed had an awareness of their local commissioner, with the commissioners' function perceived to be mostly assistance with program planning, troop visitation, and district liaison. A lesser percentage responded, "participation on troop committee", "work with the boys", and general help, as functions performed by the commissioner for their unit.

== Boy Scouts of America ==
Commissioner Service is the group within the Boy Scouts of America that provides direct service to each Scouting unit (pack, troop, team, crew or ship). Commissioners are experienced Scouters who help chartered organizations and unit leaders to achieve the aims of Scouting by using the methods of Scouting. They help to ensure that each unit has strong leadership and they encourage training, promote the use of the unit committee and encourage a relationship with the chartering organization.

The Commissioner position is the oldest in Scouting and is the origin of the professional Scouter positions. From its inception, the commissioner has been a volunteer expected to work with and encourage Scoutmasters, along with a council's paid Scout Executive.

The first national commissioner was Daniel Carter Beard, who served in that role for thirty-one years, between 1910–1941. The current National Commissioner since 2020 is W. Scott Sorrels. He succeeded Ellie Morrison, the first female national commissioner. Other previous national commissioners include George J. Fisher between 1943–1960 and Earl G. Graves Sr., the first African-American to serve as national commissioner (1990–1995).

== See also ==
- Scout leader
