= Scouting in displaced persons camps =

Scouting has been active in displaced persons camps (DP camps) and in the lives of refugees since World War I. During and after World War II, until the early 1950s, Scouting and Guiding flourished in these camps. These Scout and Girl Guide groups often provided postal delivery and other basic services in displaced persons camps. This working system was duplicated dozens of times around the world. In the present, Scouting and Guiding once again provide services and relief in camps throughout war-torn Africa.

== Armenian genocide ==
Scouting in Armenia was founded in 1912, then later developed abroad among the refugees who had survived the genocide of 1915-1916 and among those that had fled the new communist occupation of their lands, at which point Scouting ceased to exist in Armenia.

== World War I and aftermath ==
=== Europe ===
==== Austria ====
Children from the refugee camp Mitterndorf took part in Scout camps of the Österreichischer Pfadfinderbund. They were trained as helpers for youth-work in the camp. The head of the Knabenhort (after -school care center) was a Scoutmaster of the Österreichischer Pfadfinderbund from Trieste.

==== Hungary ====
Scouts worked in refugee reception centres and refugee camps.

==== Serbia ====
Scout worked in refugee camps.

==== Estonia ====
At that time Estonia was part of Tsarist Russia. Latvian and Lithuanian refugees founded Scout troops.

==== Poland ====
Scouts and Guides cared for refugees of conflicts after World War I (i.e.Polish-Soviet War).

== World War II and aftermath ==
=== Europe ===
==== Austria ====
Guide International Service sent at Christmas gift parcels to 180 Guides and Brownies in DP camps.

===== French sector camps =====
- United Nations Relief and Rehabilitation Administration-Haiming UNRRA displaced persons camp, Haiming: Volksdeutsche from Hungary, Romania and Yugoslavia, Scout group affiliated to Pfadfinder Österreichs, active 1945 to 1950, Colonel J. S. Wilson of the World Scout Bureau visited the group. There were also a group of Girl Guides.
- Kufstein UNRRA displaced persons camp, Kufstein: Estonian Guides, several Scout troops of different nationality, one of them was affiliated with group Wörgl I (Pfadfinder Österreichs) (?)
- Landeck UNRRA displaced persons camp, Landeck had a Hungarian Scout troop

===== Scout camp for displaced Scouts of Tyrol and Vorarlberg in Rinn 1948 =====
From September 17 to 21, 1948 the DP Scouts of Tyrol and Vorarlberg held a Scout camp in Rinn, Tyrol. 265 persons, including 85 Girl Guides, took part. The service team members were displaced Rover Scouts. The camp leaders were the Traveling Commissioner for D.P. Scouts in Germany and Austria J. Monnet, three Ukrainian Scouters, one Hungarian Scouter and a Scouter of the DP-Scout group of Haiming.

There were three subcamps:

- Hungarian
- Ukrainian
- Girl Guides

===== British sector camps =====
- Plast-Ukrainian Scouting, (Founder in Styria was A. Klutschko, the last Scouter was Michael Maschowec, who lived still in Styria in 1997).

Groups:

- Graz: Plast-Ukrainian Scouting
- Trofaiach displaced persons camp: Plast-Ukrainian Scouting
- Feffernitz bei Feistritz (Weißenstein), a camp for Hungarian displaced persons, had a Boy Scout troop which was founded by Tibor Zoltai in 1946.

===== after 1955 =====
- Hungarian Scout groups were founded in refugee camps following the Hungarian Revolution of 1956. In 1957 there were 11 groups with 450 Scouts registered within Pfadfinder Österreichs. (The National Scout organisation at that time.) Scouts helped refugees by collecting donations and food for the refugees and Scouts served in refugee camps.
- In the Scoutcenter Höflein in Lower Austria was a refugee camp and Scouts and Guides worked there. There were also Fundraising campaigns for the refugees there by the Austrian Scouts and Guides. There were refugees from 22 August 1992 until 1998. This camps was for refugees from Yugoslavia. Austrian Scouts and Guides also worked together with the Red Cross and Caritas to help refugees.
- In 2007 and 2008 Scouts and Guides of the Scout group Steyr 3 cooperate with "Maradonna", a residential home for juvenile refugees in Steyr.

==== Germany ====
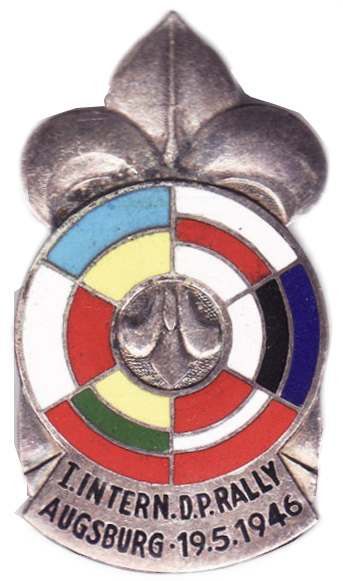
First International DP Scouts Rally badge held in Augsburg (1946), with participation of national Scouts from Ukraine, Belarus, Estonia, Latvia, Lithuania and Poland.

===== Prisoner of war camps =====
Rover crews existed in German POW camps. There existed for example secret Polish Rover Crews. There were also Belgian Scout groups.

===== American sector camps =====
- Altötting UNRRA displaced persons camp, Altötting, a camp for Latvian displaced persons, had a Scout troop
- Amberg UNRRA displaced persons camp, Amberg, a camp for Latvian displaced persons, had Girl Guides
- Ansbach UNRRA displaced persons camp, Ansbach, a camp for Latvian displaced persons, had a Scout troop and Girl Guides
- Augsburg UNRRA displaced persons camp, Augsburg, a camp for Latvian displaced persons had a Scout troop, a Rover Crew, Girl Guides and Rangers
- Bad Aibling, IRO Children's Village, a camp for displaced children representing more than 20 nationalities, had a Czechoslovak Scout group.
- Bayreuth UNRRA displaced persons camp, Bayreuth, a camp for Latvian displaced persons, had a Scout troop
- Berchtesgaden UNRRA displaced persons camp, Berchtesgaden, a camp for Latvian displaced persons, had a Scout troop and a Rover Crew
- Eichstätt UNRRA displaced persons camp, Eichstätt, a camp for Latvian displaced persons, had a Scout troop and Girl Guides
- Erlangen UNRRA displaced persons camp, Erlangen, a camp for Latvian displaced persons, had a Scout troop and Girl Guides
- Esslingen UNRRA displaced persons camp, Esslingen am Neckar, a camp for Latvian displaced persons, had Scout troops and Girl Guides
- Fischbach UNRRA displaced persons camp, Fischbach, a camp for Latvian displaced persons, had a Scout troop
- Fürth UNRRA displaced persons camp, Fürth, a camp for Latvian displaced persons, had a Scout troop, a Latvian Scout Conference took place there at 3 November 1945
- Hanau UNRRA displaced persons camp, Hanau, a camp for Latvian displaced persons, had a Scout troop and Girl Guides
- Ingolstadt UNRRA displaced persons camp, Ingolstadt, a camp for Latvian displaced persons, had Girl Guides and a Scout troop
- Karlsruhe UNRRA displaced persons camp, Karlsruhe, a camp for Latvian displaced persons, had a Scout troop
- Kassel UNRRA displaced persons camp, Kassel, a camp for Latvian displaced persons, had Girl Guides, a Rover Crew and a Scout troop
- Kleinkötz UNRRA displaced persons camp, Kleinkötz, a camp for Latvian displaced persons, had Girl Guides and a Scout troop
- IRO displaced persons camp Memmingen, Memmingen, a camp for Latvian displaced persons, had a Rover Crew
- Mainleus displaced persons camp, Mainleus, had Russian Boy Scout troops
- Memmingen Airport UNRRA displaced persons camp, Memmingen, had Russian Boy Scout troops
- Mittenwald UNRRA displaced persons camp, Mittenwald, located at the former Gebirgsjäger-Kaserne, a camp for Ukrainian, Lithuanian, and Jewish displaced persons, also had a troop of Plast Ukrainian Scouting
- Mönchehof displaced persons camp, Mönchehof, near Kassel, had Russian Boy Scout troops
- München IRO displaced persons camp, München, a camp for Latvian displaced persons, had a Scout troop and Girl Guides
- München-Bogenhausen, Munich had Russian Boy Scout troops
- München - Feldmoching, Munich had Russian Boy Scout troops
- München - Freiman, Munich had Russian Boy Scout troops
- Mühldorf displaced persons camp, Mühldorf, a camp for Latvian displaced persons, had a Scout troop, Rover Crew and Girl Guides
- Neuötting displaced persons camp, Neuötting, a camp for Latvian displaced persons, had a Scout troop and Girl Guides
- Niederraunau had Russian Boy Scout troops
- Nurnberg displaced persons camp, Nuremberg, a camp for Latvian displaced persons, had a Scout troop and Girl Guides
- Pegnitz UNRRA displaced persons camp, Pegnitz, a camp for Latvian displaced persons, had a Scout troop
- Pfaffenhofen had Russian Boy Scout troops
- Purten had Russian Boy Scout troops
- Regensburg UNRRA displaced persons camp, Regensburg, a camp for Latvian, Ukrainian and Russian displaced persons, had Latvian Scout troop, Latvian Girl Guides, a troop of Plast Ukrainian Scouting and Russian Boy Scout troops.
- Rothenburg displaced persons camp, Rothenburg, a camp for Latvian displaced persons, had Girl Guides and a Scout troop
- Rotwesten had Russian Boy Scout troops
- Schleissheim had Russian Boy Scout troops
- Schwäbisch Gmünd displaced persons camp, Schwäbisch Gmünd, a camp for Latvian displaced persons, had a Scout troop and Girl Guides
- Stuttgart UNRRA displaced persons camp, Stuttgart, a camp for Ukrainian, Russian, Jewish, Polish and Czech displaced persons had Boy Scout troops
- Traunstein displaced persons camp, Traunstein, a camp for Latvian and Russian displaced persons, had a Latvian Scout troop, Latvian Girl Guides and Russian Scout troops
- Ulm displaced persons camp, Ulm, a camp for Latvian displaced persons, had a Scout troop
- Wetzlar displaced persons camp, Wetzlar, a camp for Latvian displaced persons, had Girl Guides and a Scout troop
- Würzburg IRO displaced persons camp, Würzburg, a camp for Latvian displaced persons, had Girl Guides and a Rover Crew
- Wiesbaden displaced persons camp, Wiesbaden, a camp for Latvian displaced persons, had a Scout troop
- Zierenberg had Russian Scout troops

===== British sector camps =====
- Altgarge UNRRA displaced persons camp, near Bleckede, a camp for Latvian displaced persons, had a Scout troop and Girl Guides
- Augustdorf UNRRA displaced persons camp, Augustdorf, a camp for Latvian displaced persons, had Girl Guides, a Scout troop and a Rover Crew
- Börnsen UNRRA displaced persons camp, Börnsen, a camp for Latvian displaced persons, had Girl Guides
- Blomberg UNRRA displaced persons camp, Blomberg, a camp for Latvian displaced persons, had a Scout troop
- Dedelstorf UNRRA displaced persons camp, Dedelstorf, a camp for Latvian displaced persons, had a Scout troop and Girl Guides
- Eutin UNRRA displaced persons camp, Eutin, a camp for Latvian displaced persons, had a Scout troop and Girl Guides
- Flensburg UNRRA displaced persons camp, Flensburg, a camp for Latvian displaced persons, had a Scout troop and Girl Guides
- Geesthacht UNRRA displaced persons camp, Geesthacht, a camp for Latvian displaced persons, had Scout troops, a Rover Crew and Girl Guides
- Giften UNRRA displaced persons camp, Giften, a camp for Latvian displaced persons, had a Scout troop and Girl Guides
- Granum UNRRA displaced persons camp, Granum, a camp for Latvian displaced persons, had a Rover Crew and Girl Guides
- Greven UNRRA displaced persons camp, Greven, a camp for Latvian displaced persons, had a Scout troop and a Rover Crew
- Hannover UNRRA displaced persons camp, Hannover, a camp for Latvian displaced persons, had a Scout troop and Girl Guides
- Imbshausen UNRRA displaced persons camp, Imbshausen, a camp for Latvian and Polish displaced persons, a Latvian Girl Guides and Scout Conference took place October 23, 1949
- Lübeck UNRRA displaced persons camp, Lübeck, had a Latvian Scout troop, a Latvian Rover Crew and Latvian Girl Guides, Polish Rover Crew, provisional committee to organize Scouting among all the Polish boys in Germany and Scouting that was started by a director of an UNRRA assembly team
- Naternberg - Deggendorf, had Russian Boy Scout troops
- Neustadt displaced persons camp, Neustadt in Holstein, a camp for Latvian displaced persons, had a Scout troop, a Rover Crew and Girl Guides
- Oldenburg IRO displaced persons camp, Oldenburg, a camp for Latvian and Lithuanian displaced persons, had a Scout troop and Girl Guides
- Pinneberg displaced persons camp, Pinneberg, a camp for Baltic and Polish displaced persons, had Scout troops and Girl Guides
- Seedorf, a camp for Baltic, Polish, Lithuanian, Ukrainian, Russian and Yugoslav displaced persons had Boy Scout troops
- Sengwarden displaced persons camp, Sengwarden, a camp for Latvian displaced persons, had a Scout troop
- Wedel displaced persons camp, Wedel, a camp for Latvian displaced persons, had a Scout troop
- Wolterdingen displaced persons camp, Wolterdingen, a camp for Latvian displaced persons, had Girl Guides and a Scout troop

===== French sector camps =====
- Ravensburg had Russian Boy Scout troops

===== Soviet sector camps =====
- Niedersachswerfen had Russian Boy Scout troops

===== Unknown sector camps =====
- Dornstadt, near Ulm, Hashomer Hatzair was active in the camp
- Watenstedt bei Salzgitter displaced persons camp, near Salzgitter, a camp for Latvian displaced persons had a Scout troop
- Wangen had Russian Boy Scout troops

"The Polish Rovers at Lubeck were by no means the only displaced persons who turned to Scouting as the solution to their troubles. The report of the American, Harry K. Eby, on Scouting in the displaced persons' camps of the United States Zone shows that by 1946 seven major nationalities had established Scout Committees and were doing their utmost to supervise the work of their groups throughout the zone and in places beyond it. The program which they drew up, consisting as it did of training courses, conferences, the collection of literature, the publishing of Scout magazines and the passing of tests for badges, was, he notes, comprehensive and of fine quality. At Camp Esslingen, for example, he discovered that 165 Latvian Scouters had drawn up a well-planned program for training Scoutmasters, Scouters and Commissioners, while at Augsburg the Ukrainian Scouts to the number of 728 had celebrated the thirty-fifth anniversary of the founding of Scouting in their country. Russian Scouts of the Greek Orthodox Church had built up "an extensive and long-standing organisation," and the Poles and White Ruthenians in the zone were equally active. These various organizations were fortunate enough to receive a supply of Scout literature from the World Friendship Fund which, among other books, sent several hundred copies of Aids to Scoutmastership. They were much appreciated..."

"Scouting continues among the displaced persons in the French and British Zones in Germany, having followed the same lines as those which have proved so successful in the United States Zone. "Our best effort was quite unintentional," reports the British Governor of a colony of 15,000 Poles housed in eight villages close to Minden. "A few weeks ago I discovered a few Boy Scouts and arranged a meeting for them. We have now got 800 Scouts and about 400 Girl Guides, with a waiting list of as many again. They are as keen as mustard. When I went to a German clothing manufacturer and ordered a thousand Scout uniforms he thought I was mad but he made them."..."

===== Scouting on camp postage stamps =====
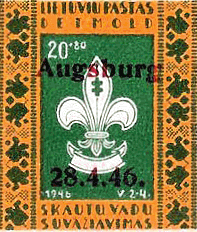
stamp of Lithuanian Scout postal system for displaced persons camps

In the years after World War II, the DP Scouting movement provided a makeshift but quite effective camp postal system using Scout postage stamps like the one illustrated.

- Mittenwald-International Conference of Scouts-in-Exile, 34 participants from Armenia, Germany, Estonia, Latvia, Lithuania, Poland, Russia, Ukraine and Hungary-stamps issued February 1/2, 1947 (camp post)
- Mittenwald-July 5, 1947: one commemorative stamp commemorating the 35th anniversary of the founding of Plast, showing the membership badge of Plast Ukrainian Scouting and a second showing a Scout

A Ukrainian Scout Jamboree took place in Mittenwald from July 5 to 7, 1947. The same design exists for Ukrainian / Scouts Congress / Aschaffenburg / 26. - 29. III. 1948

- In Mönchehof displaced persons camp the Russian Scouts provided postal delivery and issued Scout stamps.

==== Hungary ====
There were Polish Scout troops in refugee camps during World War II.

==== Liechtenstein ====
In Liechtenstein Scouts helped refugees by collecting donations and food for the refugees. Rover Scouts and Ranger Guides served in refugee camps.

==== United Kingdom and France ====
In 1960 the Norfolk International Jamboree, held at Sennowe Park near Fakenham, drew media attention due to the presence of fifty "European refugees."

===== Prisoner of war camps =====
German Catholic Scout groups existed in prisoner of war camps in the United Kingdom and France.

In POW Camp 273 at Debach Airfield (near Ipswich) existed a German Catholic Scout group from 1946 to 1948. This were the same Scouts as in Fort Devens.

Scout groups including Germans and Austrians existed in several Prisoner of war camps of the western Allies.

===== Refugee camps in Vichy France =====
In refugee camps in Vichy France for Belgian refugees were active Scout groups.

===== Internment camp on Isle of Man =====
In an internment camp for Germans on the Isle of Man a Scout group was active.

===== Temporary national movements in the United Kingdom =====
The Polish Scout Headquarters moved first to Paris in 1939 and then to London. There were Polish Scout groups in Great Britain during World War II and afterwards. There were not only Polish, but also French, Czechoslovak, Yugoslav and others. They had strong ties to their Governments in Exile.

==== Sweden ====
There were Estonian Scouts and Guide groups founded in reception camps in 1944.

==== Kosovo War ====
Albanian Scouts and Guides worked in refugee camps. Italian Scouts and Guides helped in the construction of refugee camps and worked in refugee camps, too. Polish Guides and Scout sent gift parcels to children in refugee camps (Peacepacks). Austrian Scouts and Guides started a Fundraising campaign and financed two days in the Austrian refugee camp. The campaign had the name "Mein Taschengeld für den Kosovo" (My pocket money for the Kosovo).

=== North America ===
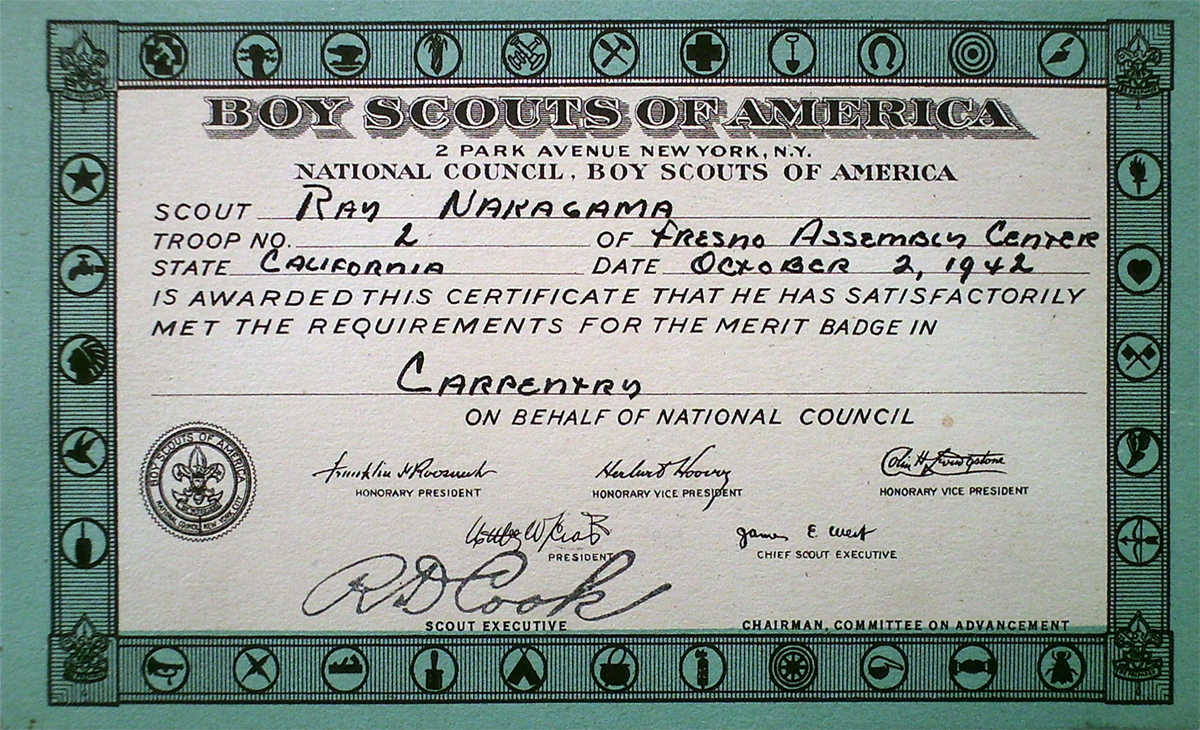
Fresno Assembly Center merit badge card dated October 2, 1942. Recipient is actually named Roy Nakagawa, not Ray Nakagama.

==== Prisoner of war camps ====
German Catholic Scout groups existed in prisoner of war camps in the United States.

Examples include: A German Catholic Scout group existed from 1945 to 1946 in the POW camp Fort Devens. Founded by former members of the DPSG, encouraged by the priest Eberhard Droste. The Scouters were Meinrad Much and a German comrade. Much had been a Scout in the DPSG between 1933 and 1936. There were 20 Scouts, aged between 18 and 22. This group was part of the Catholic camp parish. Another group was the Kolpingfamilie. Together with the Lutheran camp parish and the Kolpingfamilie the Scouts collected money to help Germany and consigned 10,000 dollars to the Caritas. An important day for the Scouts was their Confirmation. It was celebrated by the Archbishop of Boston.

==== Japanese American internment camps ====
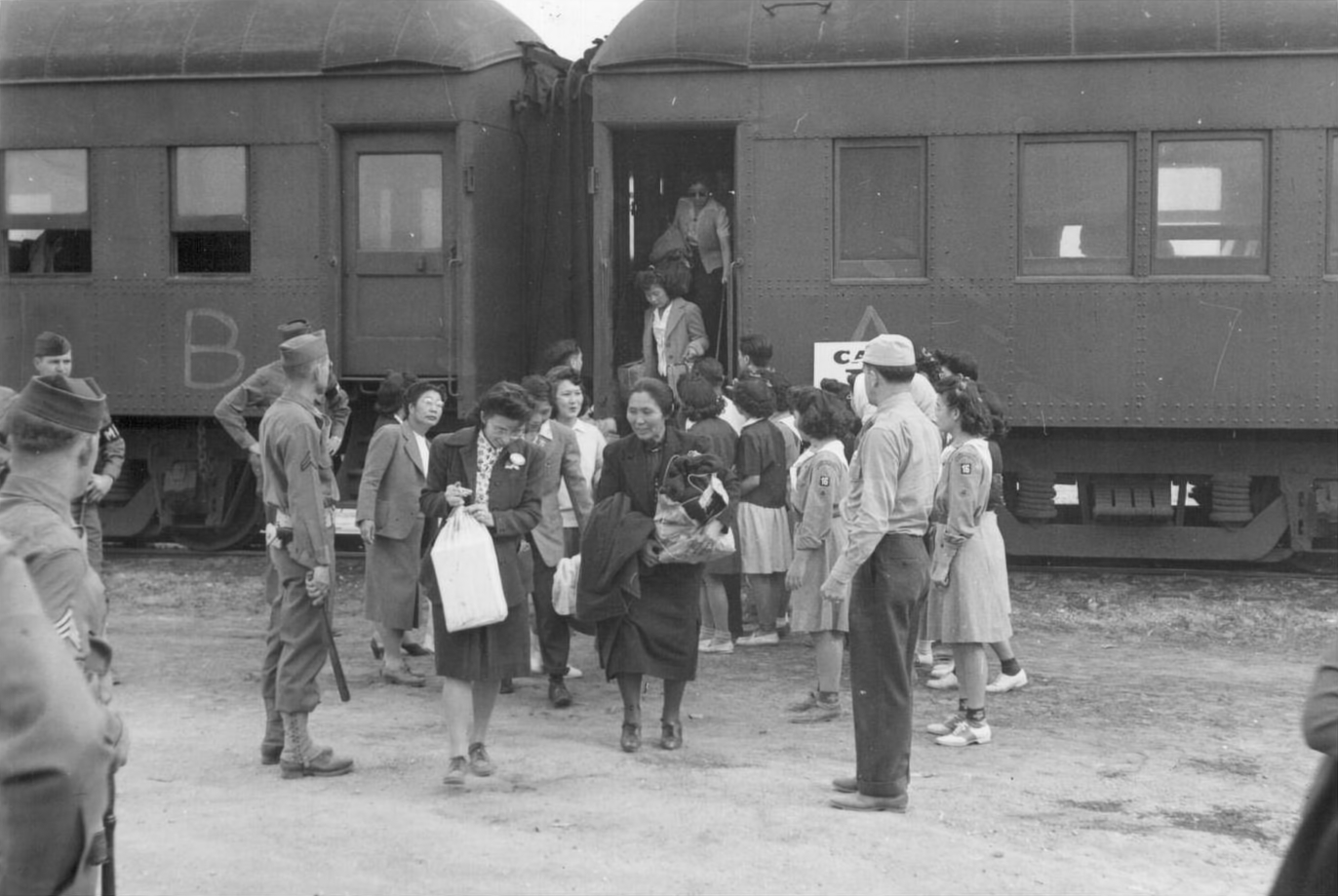
Arrivals leaving train assisted by Girl Scout with their baggage, Heart Mountain War Relocation Center, September 1943

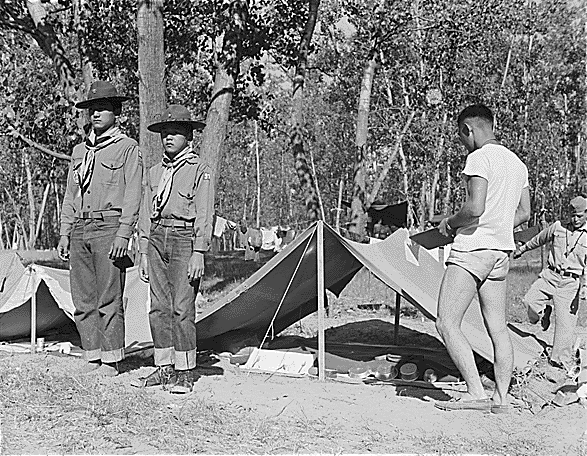
A 5-day Boy Scout camp on the bank of the Mississippi River was composed of nearly a hundred boys from the Rohwer War Relocation Center, together with a small troop from the nearby town of Arkansas City. August 1943

Boy Scouts of America units were at all ten War Relocation Authority (WRA) Japanese American internment centers during World War II. Girl Scouts of the USA units were also at most of these camps. Both Boy Scouts and Girl Scouts were also at many of the camps not run by the WRA. Internees at the Granada War Relocation Center set up a separate Amache District for Scouts at the camp, after the camp's unofficial name Camp Amache. Camp leaders, internees themselves, set up the system. On December 6, 1942, one of the pro-Japanese internees at Manzanar started rushing towards the flagpole to tear down the American flag. A group of Japanese American Boy Scouts, surrounded the flagpole and armed themselves with stones the size of baseballs, refusing to allow the flag to be taken down.

==== Emergency refugee shelter ====
Between 1944 and 1946 there was an international Boy Scout troop in Oswego, N.Y whose members were young Jewish refugees from Europe. It was Troop 28 of the Boy Scouts of America and its Scoutmaster was Harold D. Clark. There were also a Cub Scout pack and a Girl Scout troop located there.

=== Asia ===
==== Japan ====
Rover Crews also existed in Japanese POW camps.

==== China ====
In 1939 the United Rovers were founded by the Austrian Scouter Fredy Mittler in Shanghai. This group consisted of Austrian and German émigrés. It was affiliated with The Boy Scout Association. At the end of World War II there were 120 members.

==== Israel ====
Refugees from Poland during World War II founded Scout groups.

==== India ====
Refugees from Poland during World War II founded Scout troops, Guide companies, Cub and Brownie packs.

==== Iran ====
Refugees from Poland during World War II had Scouting activities such as summer camps organized by Polish Scouters. There were also Scout troops and Guide companies. This groups were part of Związek Harcerstwa Polskiego. They were under the jurisdiction of Z.H.P. National Committee in London.

==== Malaysia, Indonesia, and the Philippines ====
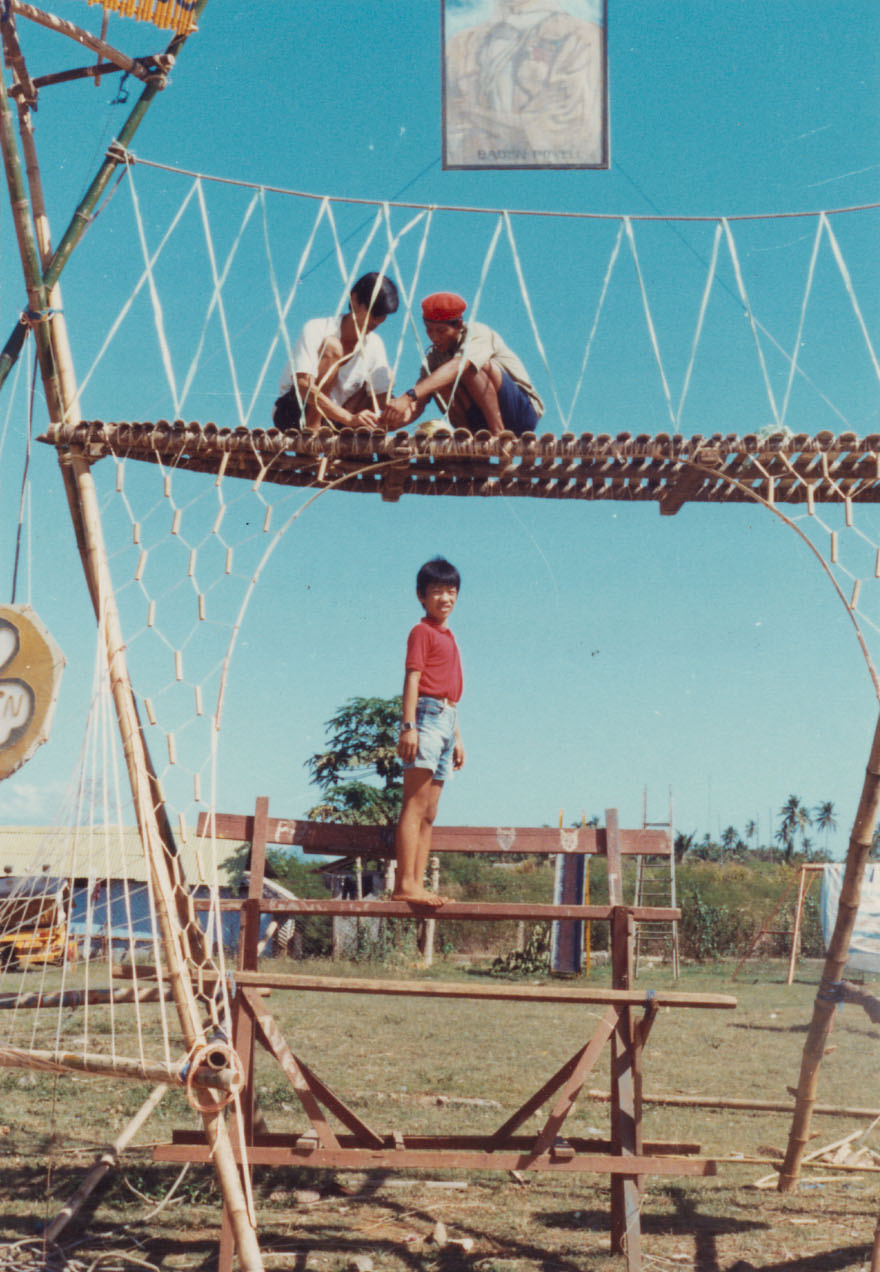
Vietnamese Boy Scouts in Philippine Refugee Processing Center.

There were Scout groups in refugee camps for Vietnamese refugees after the Vietnam War (1960–1975), who received support from the UNHCR.

==== Russia ====
In Siberian POW Camps existed secret Polish Rover Crews.

==== Palestine ====
After the 1948 war the Modern scouts of Palestine were formed.

=== Africa ===
"In Africa alone the Z.H.P.National Committee in London catered for some 4000 children in 51 Guide companies, 27 Scout troops and 61 Cub Scout and Brownie packs."

==== Northern Rhodesia ====
Refugees from Poland during World War II founded Scout groups in Northern Rhodesia. They worked together with the British Scouts there. For example: "At Lusaka there were soon 88 Polish Scouts and 102 Guides and brownies."

==== Mauritius ====
Jewish displaced persons during World War II had a Scout troop.

=== International events ===
Estonian Scouts have been present at every World Scout Jamboree and Rover Moot, although after World War II, they were compelled to arrive and participate in these events with contingents of other countries. The only exceptions were the World Jamboree at Moisson in 1947 in which 36 Estonian DP-Scouts from Germany took part under the Estonian colors; and the Jubilee Jamboree at Sutton Park, England, in 1957, where it was possible for Estonian Scouts to fly their own flag in the camp allotted to the Council of Scout Associations in Exile. Hungarian Scouts have been present at the World Jamborees in 1947, 1951, 1955, 1957, 1959, and 1963. In 1951 the Hungarian Scouts were members of the Austrian and German contingents. In 1957 40 Hungarian Scouts were members of the Austrian contingent. The Hungarians were also represented in the camp allotted to Council of Scout Associations in Exile at the JIM in 1957. The Association of Armenian Scouts have been present at many international Scouting events, including World Jamborees and Rover Moots.

In 1947 Latvian DP-Scouts from Germany took part in the 6th World Scout Jamboree at Moisson under the Latvian colors. Ukrainian DP-Scouts from Germany also took part in the 6th World Jamboree. In the Jamboree map printed in the Jamboree newspaper of 6 August 1947 there is a Contingent of "Displaced Persons" listed.

In the 7th World Jamboree in 1951 Scouts-in-Exile and DP-Scouts from Hungary, Latvia and Lithuania participated as part of the German contingent. Russian Scouts-in-Exile also attended as a separate group. Scouts-in-Exile from Russia, Lithuania, Latvia and Hungary stayed at Subcamp 4 "Niederösterreich". A Displaced Persons Troop stayed at Subcamp 6 "Steiermark.".

At the 9th World Scout Jamboree the Council of Scout Associations in Exile, ZHP-in exile and the Association of Armenian Scouts were represented. The Council of Scout Associations in Exile camped at Subcamp Copenhangen and included Scouts-in-exile from Hungary, Russia, Lithuania, Latvia, Estonia and Ukraine.

==== First International Boy Scout Rally in Mittenwald ====
From July 24 to 28, 1948 2,500 Scouts from Germany, DP-Scouts from Germany and Scouts from other countries gathered together. The Bund Deutscher Pfadfinder Bayern organized the event.

==== International Scouter Association ====
The International Scouter Association was founded during a Scout conference in March 1947 in Mittenwald. The founders were German and Scouts-in-exile. The seat was in Munich.

==== D.P. Scout Division of the Boy Scouts International Bureau ====
At the 11th International Conference in Chateau de Rosny in France the resolution 14/47 was drafted and approved. So the D.P.Scout Division came into existence. D.P.Scout Division of the Boy Scouts International Bureau was active in Austria, Northern Italy and West Germany. The DP Scouts were registered as Scouts by the International Bureau, but had no right to vote in the International Conference. So from 1947 to 1950 DP Scouts were not Non-aligned Scouting organizations. Leader of the Division was Jean R.Monnet, a British leader who had been involved in Scouts' International Relief Service. The office of the Division was in Frankfurt am Main. Since the resolution 14/47 was drafted it was clear that no "National Movements on Foreign Soil" would be registered by the Boy Scouts International Bureau. Scouts-in-Exile outside the camps should join the National Scout organisation of their country of residence. After the German and Austrian Scouts became registered as members of Boy Scouts International Bureau in 1950 and 1946 the Scouts in displaced persons camps should join the National Scout organisation of this countries. So the D.P.Scout Division of the Boy Scouts International Bureau was closed down as of June 30, 1950.

=== World Association Training ===
The World Association Training scheme was a Guiding activity after World War II. Mona Burgin was the leader of the first team briefed to find and support Guides living in displaced persons' camps. After the team's first tour of duty, General Sir Evelyn Fanshawe, at that time in charge of the U.N. relief operation in the then British Zone of Germany, "remarked that, in his opinion, Scouting and Guiding were the most rehabilitative factors at work in the camps at that time." Elizabeth Hartley followed Burgin as leader of the team.

=== Scouts' International Relief Service and Guide International Service (GIS) ===
The Scouts' International Relief Service was active in refugee and displaced persons' camps in Northwest Europe, Italy, Austria, Yugoslavia, Greece, Cyprus, Syria, Palestine, Egypt and Hong Kong.

"The GIS was one of the approved organisations to provide teams to work with displaced persons and refugees under the umbrella of the British Red Cross, the British Army and the United Nations relief and rehabilitation administration. From 1945 teams of women were formed to undertake medical, catering and canteen duties, establishing feeding schemes in camps; providing hospital equipment, medical supplies and disease control, as well as food and general relief supplies, saving thousands of lives. In 1947 repatriation and emigration schemes were established. 1951 brought the inauguration of education, adoption and parcels schemes. The service was disbanded in 1952 with any remaining funds being distributed to further assist displaced persons.".

== DPs and Scouting/Guiding today ==
Scouting and Guiding maintain work for and with displaced persons today, as with the work of World Association of Girl Guides and Girl Scouts with the United Nations High Commissioner for Refugees.

- Scouting and DPs in the Great Lakes Region of Africa.
- "The Uganda Scouts will be running a project to train 40 Peer Educators in Abstinence and Being faithful among the Youth (ABY) in HIV prevention. This will run in five Internally Displaced Persons (IDP) camps in Gulu District. They will also conduct a refresher workshop for 30 Scout trainers in Gulu with emphasis on Scout leaders in the IDP camps."
- "Africa: Using the Girl Guide method to teach adolescent refugees about health issues and to train them as peer educators."
- "Sudan - Since the Darfur Crisis began in July 2003, Scouts in Sudan have been managing camps for Internally Displaced Persons, distributing food and relief and raising awareness of health issues."
- Saharan Scouts are also purported to exist in the refugee camps of Tindouf, Algeria.(see Scouting in Western Sahara)
- Refugees and Internally Displaced People.

=== Palestine ===
Today there are Scout groups in Palestine Refugee camps.

== See also ==
- Boy Scouts of the United Nations
- Mury - a clandestine Girl Scout group in the concentration camp at Ravensbrück
- Norman Mineta
- World Friendship Fund
