= Latvijas Skautu un Gaidu Centrālā Organizācija =

National Scouting and Guiding organisation of Latvia

- Latvian Scout and Guide Central Organization
- Headquarters: Kalpaka bulvāris 10-18
- Location: Riga
- Country: Latvia
- Founded: 1917/1990
- Membership: 759
- Affiliation: World Association of Girl Guides and Girl Scouts, World Organization of the Scout Movement
- Website http://www.skauti.lv

Latvijas Skautu un Gaidu Centrālā Organizācija (Latvian Scout and Guide Central Organization, LSGCO) is the primary national Scouting and Guiding organisation of Latvia and a member of both the World Association of Girl Guides and Girl Scouts and the World Organization of the Scout Movement. The organization had 759 members as of 2011 (466 Scouts and 293 Guides). Scouting activities began in Latvia in 1917 when the area was still part of the Russian Empire. After independence in 1918, the national organization was established and Scouting thrived in Latvia in the 1920s-1930s. Upon the Soviet occupation of Latvia in 1940, Scouting was suppressed and not re-established until 1990, when Latvia regained its independence.

== History ==
Historic emblem of Latvian Scouting and Guiding

The Latvian Scouting program is based on the principles and methods created by Robert Baden-Powell. The first Scout troop in Latvia was established on April 17, 1917, under Tsarist Russia by Arvīds Bredermanis and other Scouts from Tartu, Estonia, followed by several other Scout troops in the Riga area. The national scouting organization was founded in 1918 upon Latvia's independence from Tsarist Russia and its centennial was officially celebrated in 2018.

The Latvian Scout Organization (Latvijas Skautu Organizācija) was established in 1921, and Latvia was a founding member of the World Organization, from 1922 to 1940. Guiding began in Latvia in 1921 under Latvian Youth Organizations. In early 1922 The Latvian Guide Central Organization (Latvijas Gaidu Centrālā Organizācija) was set up, and Girl Guiding was permitted to operate independently. By the 1930s, the Latvian Scouting and Guiding movements had grown to more than eight thousand members. In early August, 1933, Latvian Scouts attended the 4th World Scout Jamboree in Hungary, along with boys from the other Baltic states. Following the Jamboree, Latvia enjoyed a visit from Robert Baden-Powell, World Chief Scout and Olave Baden-Powell, World Chief Guide on August 18, 1933, during their Baltic goodwill cruise on the SS Calgaric. In 1937, Scouts from Latvia attended the 5th World Scout Jamboree in the Netherlands, which would be the last such pre-war gathering and the final one attended by Baden-Powell.

In 1940, after the Soviet occupation of Latvia, Scouting and Guiding were banned and a special officer was appointed by the communists to abolish Scouting. Scouting continued unofficially, underground, operating without uniforms and in the forests to avoid detection. In 1941, the Communists killed the Latvian Scout founder and President, General Kārlis Goppers (1876–1941). The former Scout Commissioner for Latvia, Valdemārs Klētnieks, was in a German displaced persons camp during World War II. Following the end of the war, he came to the United States as a refugee, initially given shelter by a Boy Scouts of America official, E. Urner Goodman, at his Vermont home. In December, 1950, the Klētnieks family appeared at a Brattleboro, Vermont, church, where they spoke of their wartime experiences as exiles and recalled Christmas in Latvia, singing the songs of their homeland.

With the fall of communism, Scouting reemerged, and in 1989, a camp was organized. In 1990, Latvian Scouts held their fifth National Jamboree, "Renewal" and invited several other countries to participate. The Latvian Scout and Guide Central Organization rejoined the World Organization of the Scout Movement (WOSM) in 1993, as well as the World Association of Girl Guides and Girl Scouts. Since then, the Latvian organization has participated in several international projects all around the world.

== See also ==
- Scouting in displaced persons camps
