= Purten =

Municipality in Bavaria, Germany

Coordinates: 48°12′N 12°26′E

Pürten is a parish village which is part of the Gemeindeteil and a Gemarkung of the town of Waldkraiburg in the district of Mühldorf am Inn in Bavaria, Germany. Purten is the site of a post World War II American sector displaced person camp.

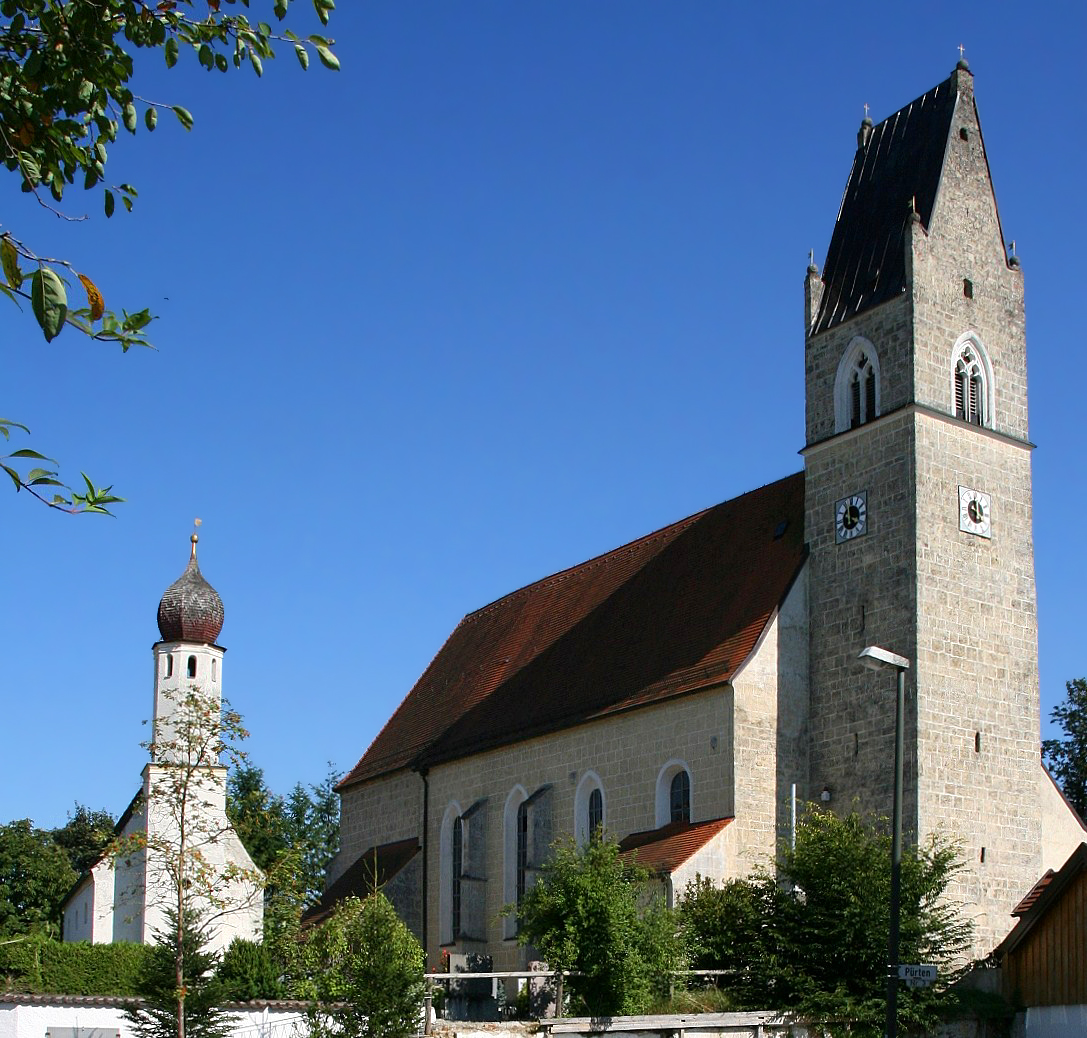
Parish and pilgrimage church of the Assumption of Mary in Pürten

Pürten became an independent rural municipality with the municipal edict of 1818, which was incorporated into Waldkraiburg on January 1, 1974.

== Geography ==
Pürten is divided into an upper village (Oberdorf, with the parish and pilgrimage church) and a lower village (Unterdorf) situated on the edge of a terrace overlooking the Inn River.

The Pürten district (09 8849) covers 8.539 km² and has 1,163 inhabitants.

== Coat of arms ==
Pürten

Divided; above in three rows cloud-like shapes of blue and silver, below in black two six-pointed golden stars side by side.
