= Arvīds Brēdermanis =

Founder of the Latvian Scouting movement

Arvīds Brēdermanis (10 October 1900 – 22 February 1970) was an official of the foreign service of Latvia between the World Wars, and was also a founder of the Latvian Scouting movement.

== Early years ==
Brēdermanis was born in Riga in 1900. His father, Kārlis, was a civil servant. Brēdermanis attended Vilis Olavs' Commercial School and the Riga City Realschule.

During World War I and the occupation of much of Latvia by the German Army, his family evacuated as refugees to other parts of the Russian Empire. In 1919, Brēdermanis finished his secondary education in Barnaul, and prepared to matriculate at Tomsk University. Instead, however, he was mobilised into Aleksandr Kolchak's anti-Bolshevik army in Siberia. He later transferred to the Latvian volunteer Imanta Regiment and also served the French military mission in Vladivostok.

He eventually returned to Latvia along with the Imanta Regiment, and served in the Latvian Army for a year, until demobilisation in January 1920.

== Pioneering role in Latvian Scouting ==
Latvian Scouting began during World War I, when many of Riga's schools had been evacuated to Dorpat (Tartu in present-day Estonia) as the Russian–German front lines approached Riga. In Tartu, three Scout troops—the 5th, 6th, and 7th Dorpat Troops—were formed completely or primarily of Latvian boys from evacuated Riga schools. These were the first ever Latvian Scouts. Brēdermanis was the leader of the 6th Troop, founded 26 September 1916. Most of these first troops proved short lived, however, disbanding already when the schoolboys left the town for their holidays.

In April 1917, many of the former Latvian Scouts from Dorpat/Tartu were back in Riga for Easter holidays. K. Perešs, former leader of the 5th Troop, placed an appeal in the daily newspaper Jaunākās Ziņas on 8 April 1917, for the boys from Tartu to meet up and found a Scout Group in Riga. As a result, a new troop (officially known as the 92nd Russian Troop) was founded on 17 April 1917, with Perešs as Scout Leader and Brēdermanis as Patrol Leader. The troop numbered some 120 Scouts, about half of them Latvian boys.

On 3 August 1917, about 50 Latvian Scouts founded a separate 5th Riga Troop under Brēdermanis' leadership. This troop's activity was interrupted when the German Army occupied Riga, and the German military authorities arrested them as if they were military cadets.

Following his evacuation as a refugee to Samara in the Russian interior, Brēdermanis tried unsuccessfully to revive the activity of the 5th Riga Troop.

== Foreign service career ==
After his military service, Brēdermanis took up studies in economics at the University of Latvia in Riga. In parallel, he began working in the Foreign Ministry, where he made a career for himself in the foreign service. Aside from various ministry posts, he served abroad in Latvia's diplomatic missions in Berlin (1923–24) and in Kaunas (1930–33), then the provisional capital of Lithuania.

He left the foreign service to work as a journalist for the Latvian Telegraph Agency from 1935 to 1939. From 1938 to 1939, he studied theology, again at the University of Latvia.

From 1939 until the Soviet occupation of Latvia in mid-1940, he worked as press secretary for the Japanese Embassy in Riga.

== Persecution and later life under the Soviets ==
After the loss of Latvia's independence in 1940, the Soviet authorities arrested Brēdermanis as a Japanese spy. In August 1940, he was sentenced to 8 years' imprisonment in the Gulag, which he spent in labor camps in Mordovia. In 1948 his sentence was changed to 15 years' imprisonment. He was released and returned to the Latvian SSR in 1955. Eventually he was able to settle in Riga. For the rest of his working life he was employed as an accountant at state enterprises. He died in Riga on 22 February 1970 and was buried in the Riga Forest Cemetery.
