= Giften =

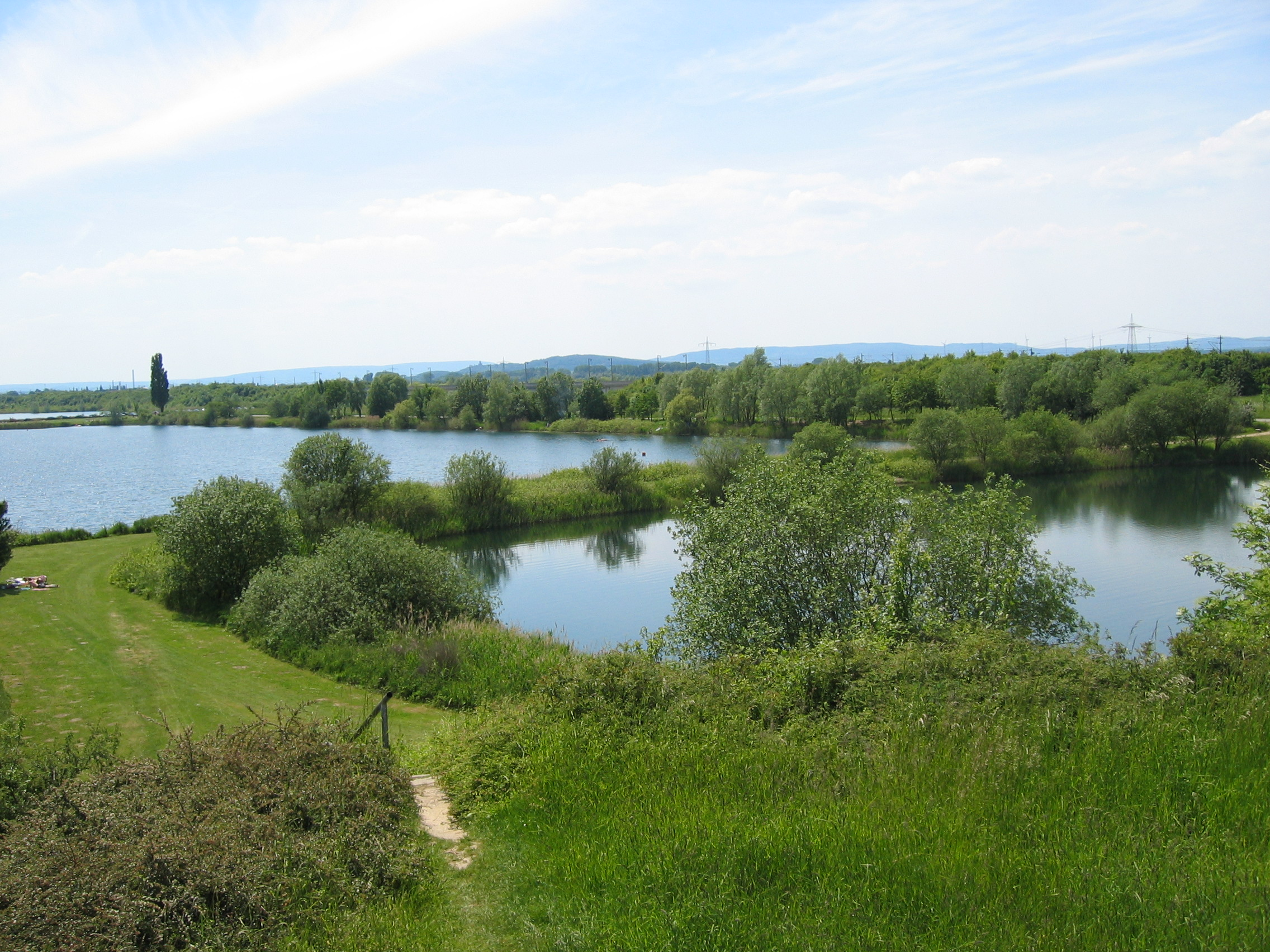
Giften's lakes, a nature reserve in 2004.

Giften, a part of the town of Sarstedt in Germany, is the site of a post World War II British sector displaced person camp.

Until March 1, 1974 Giften was an independent municipality.
