= International Boy Scouts of the Canal Zone =

Boy Scouts organization of the Panama Canal Zone

Boy Scouts of the Panama Canal Zone

The Boy Scouts of the Panama Canal Zone were founded in 1947, recognized by the World Organization of the Scout Movement in 1955, and had 970 members in 1957. The organization had ties to the Boy Scouts of the United Nations, and existed at least through the 1960s, directly registered to the World Scout Bureau. A delegation from the IBSCZ attended the 14th World Scout Jamboree in Norway in 1975.

In 1937 J. S. Wilson met with Gunnar Berg and Ray Wyland of the Boy Scouts of America at Balboa, Panama, on his way to Bogotá, for a conference about mixed-race Scouts in the Panama Canal Zone, who claimed British and not Panamanian nationality. It was agreed that they should be taken under the wing of the Canal Zone Council of the Boy Scouts of America, but in 1947 they were transferred directly under the International Bureau as the International Boy Scouts of the Canal Zone.
