= Boy Scouts of the United Nations =

The Boy Scouts of the United Nations existed from 1945 through perhaps the early 1980s as the Scouting association serving the families of diplomats and staff of the United Nations, active in both Geneva and at Parkway Village in New York. The organization sponsored groups in India, Lebanon and Cyprus and had ties to the International Boy Scouts of the Canal Zone.

== History ==
Punch cartoon, 1929: Patrols of Peace

The concept of and aspirations for Scouting in such a fashion predates the formation of the United Nations itself. In a full-page cartoon from the July 1929 Punch magazine, entitled Patrols of Peace, the League of Nations, represented as a goddess, looks out at the 3rd World Scout Jamboree, held in Birkenhead, Merseyside, England, saying, "They say I've got no army; but why should I want one with these allies?" (Beneath is stated With Mr. Punch's congratulations to the Chief Scout on the coming-of-age of the movement-now international-which he inspired.)

An early 1945 issue of the Cass City Chronicle newspaper stated:

The Boy Scouts of the United Nations are planning to resume their world-wide friendships, through correspondence, exchange of equipment and by meeting in person at the great World Scout Jamborees when the war is won. The Boy Scouts of America, celebrating its 35th anniversary from February 8th to 14th, with its theme "Scouts of the World-Brothers Together" is encouraging its members to establish contacts with other Scout Troops in war-torn lands, and if possible, help them restore Scouting.

The term "United Nations" was used at the time to refer to the Allies of World War II, having been originally coined for that purpose by Franklin D. Roosevelt in 1942.

When what we know of today as the United Nations took up residence in first at what is now the campus of Lehman College in the Bronx in 1946 and briefly in the NY State Pavilion of the 1939 World's Fair in Flushing Meadows park, the body met the longest at the Sperry Gyroscope facility in Lake Success, New York, from 1947 to 1952, before their headquarters building was opened on Manhattan's east side in 1952.

The international delegations employee's families were mostly housed in an area of Queens called Parkway Village, located at the intersection of the Grand Central Parkway and the Long Island Expressway. Within this community was Public School 117. It was at this school that UN Troop 1, the scout unit (founded in March 1948), and Troop 2, the cub pack (founded in May 1949) would hold their meetings as well as many of their events. The scouts participated in weekend camping trips to Alpine Scout Camp, NJ, and held a summer camp in 1949 at Camp Eagle, Berkshire County Council, Pittsfield, MA.

One of the last events was held on February 8, 1974 when United Nations Scout Day was held at the Manhattan HQ building in conjunction with the Greater New York Councils.

In 1957 the United Nations Scout Association, which was founded in 1948 had 48 members. It became a member of the World Organization of the Scout Movement in 1950.

One troop of the Boy Scouts of the United Nations took part in the 7th World Scout Jamboree in Bad Ischl.

The Boy Scouts of the United Nations took part in the Jubilee Jamboree in 1957.

Also, children of diplomatic and commercial representatives of East bloc countries were members of the Boy Scouts of the United Nations.

== Today ==
Scouting and Guiding maintain close relations with the United Nations today, as with the work of World Association of Girl Guides and Girl Scouts, World Organization of the Scout Movement and International Scout and Guide Fellowship with the United Nations High Commissioner for Refugees.

The World Association of Girl Guides and Girl Scouts and the World Organization of the Scout Movement have formal consultative relations with UNESCO. The International Scout and Guide Fellowship has also official relations with UNESCO.

== See also ==
- Skolta Esperanto Ligo
- World Friendship Fund
- Scouting in displaced persons camps
