= Scouting in Yugoslavia =

The Scout movement in Yugoslavia was served by different organizations during the existence of the multi-ethnic state.

== Early 20th century ==
Četnik (Scouting for Boys) by Robert Baden-Powell, translated by Miloš Popović

Scouting in the Austro-Hungarian regions of what became Yugoslavia started in 1910, and in Serbia in 1911.

Scout emblem depicting the arms of the Kingdom of Yugoslavia superimposed on a fleur-de-lis, pre-1939

The first Scout units in what was to become Yugoslavia were founded in 1911 by Dr. Miloš Popović, in Belgrade, Kragujevac, Vranje and Valjevo.

A national organization in the Kingdom of Serbs, Croats and Slovenes was founded around 1920; it was among the 20 founding members of the World Organization of the Scout Movement (WOSM) in 1922 (until 1950). It was later renamed to Savez Skauta Kraljevine Jugoslavije.

== After World War II ==
The outbreak of World War II saw the suspension of Scouting in Serbia and Montenegro in 1941, when the Germans occupied Yugoslavia.

The Russian Scout association Русский Скаут went into exile after World War I, and continued where fleeing White Russian émigrés settled, establishing groups in Serbia.

The organization had to stop its activities in 1941 after the German occupation of Serbia. It resumed its activities after World War II but was banned again by the communist government in 1946; thus it lost the membership in WOSM in 1948.

Scouting in Yugoslavia was co-opted by the Josip Broz Tito government of the Socialist Federal Republic of Yugoslavia in 1950, at which time WOSM membership was forfeited, as the new organization did not meet all the criteria for membership, as there were very close connections with the communist government. In 1950 and 1951, individual Scout associations were founded in each constituent republics. The national organization was revived under the name Savez Izviđača Jugoslavije (Scout Association of Yugoslavia) on November 24, 1951, at a meeting held in Zagreb, Croatia.

The Scout movement grew and thrived until the Yugoslav dissolution in 1991. In addition, the government of SFR Yugoslavia fostered their own Pioneer movement, the Pioniri - under the League of Communists of Yugoslavia through the League of Communist Youth of Yugoslavia.

May 14 was marked as the anniversary of the Scout Association, marking the anniversary of the May 1950 joint camp in Zagreb, Croatia, of the revived Scouts and the UPY.

== After SFR Yugoslavia ==
The break-up of Yugoslavia led also to the partial dissolution of Savez Izviđača Jugoslavije; the associations of Bosnia and Herzegovina, Croatia, the Republic of Macedonia and Slovenia subsequently gained membership in WOSM.

== Serbia and Montenegro ==
The federal membership badge of the Savez Izviđača Srbije i Crne Gore incorporated the color scheme of the flag of Serbia and Montenegro, now split

The Scout Association of Yugoslavia - Savez Izviđača Jugoslavije/Савез Извиђача Југославије - continued to existed as the primary national Scouting organization of Federal Republic of Yugoslavia (Serbia and Montenegro). It became a WOSM member on September 1, 1995, to represent Serbian and Montenegrin Scouting interests in the European Region and worldwide.

The association was very active in social work for all segments of the population, and cooperated closely with the Red Cross in providing aid to refugees, opportunities for the disabled, help for orphans and general aid to areas in crisis.

The organization was renamed to Savez Izviđača Srbije i Crne Gore (Serbian: Савез Извиђача Србије и Црне Горе, SISCG, Scout Association of Serbia and Montenegro) on February 4, 2003, following the renaming of the Federal Republic of Yugoslavia to Serbia and Montenegro.

The SISCG did work for the environment: they were active in a campaign to introduce new methods and materials of packaging, different schemes for garbage collection and recycling programmes. Serbia and Montenegro fielded a contingent EuroJam 2005.

Following 2006, when Montenegro declared its independence. Savez Izviđača Srbije i Crne Gore split once again, into:

- Savez Izviđača Srbije (Scout Association of Serbia)
- Savez Izviđača Crne Gore (Scout Association of Montenegro)

The split in SISCG was treated like the split that happened with Czechoslovakia's Junák in 1993, so both nations reapplied for World Organization of the Scout Movement membership. WOSM membership was transferred to Serbia while Montenegro was admitted on July 1, 2008.

The coeducational Savez Izviđača Srbije i Crne Gore had 5,856 members as of 2004; with the national split, percentages belonging to each section are unknown.

=== Membership ===
The Savez Izviđača Srbije i Crne Gore was a voluntary, independent, nonpolitical and social organization of children, youth and adults, for development of their physical, intellectual and spiritual potential. Every citizen of the State Union of Serbia and Montenegro could become a member of the Savez Izviđača Srbije i Crne Gore, if he or she accepted the Program of the Association and acts in accordance with the Scout Laws and regulations of the Constitution of Savez Izviđača Srbije i Crne Gore, and was active in his or her unit and in the Association.

The President of Savez Izviđača Srbije i Crne Gore was Vuko Darmanovic from Podgorica, elected in March 1995. He served a four-year term. The vice-president is Nikola Petrovic from Kraljevo.

The Savez Izviđača Srbije i Crne Gore did not own its own centers, nor did the individual Scout Organizations of Serbia and Montenegro. A number of Scout Groups had their own centers, including groups in Buljarice, Debelo Brdo, and Brezovica.

=== Regional Scouting divisions ===
The SISCG included:

- Савез Извиђача Србије/Savez Izviđača Srbije, the Scout Organization of Serbia
  - Where most countries have a formalized structure of Councils, Districts and Groups, Serbia had a less formal organization. At the heart of Savez Izviđača Srbije were the Groups, typically much bigger than Groups in other countries, containing several Cub packs, Scout troops and Senior Scout units. For example, the France Prešeren Group in Belgrade, founded in 1957, has had over 11,000 members, over 200 new members a year.
  - Vojvodina autonomous region of Serbia had their own Scout Councils, which belonged to Savez Izviđača Srbije - The Scout Association of Vojvodina (Serbian: Savez Izviđača Vojvodine/Савез Извиђача Војводине, Hungarian: Vajdasági Cserkészek, Croatian: Savez Izviđača Vojvodine) has been active since 1911, when the first local Scout units were founded in Novi Sad, Pančevo, Subotica and other places. The Scout Association of Vojvodina, which has around 2000 members, unites the work of 35 Scout units from towns and villages across Vojvodina. The work of the Scout Association of Vojvodina includes camps, various activities, training of leaders, meetings, seminars, and competitions, Scout jamborees of Vojvodina gathering up to 2000 participants, orienteering all-around competitions, an international Scout artists' colony, and the Eurostep program, including an Eco-camp in Pančevo, the Archeology camp in Sremska Mitrovica, the International Scout Artists' Colony in Kovačica and the Camp for River Scouts in Kanjiža.
  - Kosovo autonomous region of Serbia had their own Scout Council - Savez Izviđača Kosova i Metohije
  - Local Scout Councils - multiple Scout Groups in a locality (such as a city or district) formed local Scout Councils:
    - City Scout Councils in Belgrade and Niš
    - 12 District Scout Councils around Serbia in Ada, Požarevac, Velika Plana, Bačka Topola, Rakovica, Vranje, Čukarica, Šabac, Zaječar, Kruševac, Subotica and Zvezdara.
- Савез Извиђача Црне Горе/Savez Izviđača Crne Gore, the Scout Organization of Montenegro - A referendum on independence was held in Republic of Montenegro on May 21, 2006, voting to leave its state union with Serbia by a narrow margin. Montenegro became the world's 193rd recognized sovereign state, which then split the Savez Izviđača Srbije i Crne Gore, as happened with Czechoslovakia in 1993.

=== National Scout Fellowship ===
The Serbia and Montenegro National Scout Fellowship (SAMnet) was a British Scouting's country-focussed network, a forum where members of The Scout Association with a specific interest in Serbia and Montenegro regularly visited the country and worked to raise awareness within the UKSA of Scouting there and in the Balkans in general. SAMnet was formed in May 2004 after a Scout Association study visit to the country.

=== Program, sections and ideals ===
Groups could belong to Local Scout Councils and/or Regional Scout Organizations, but many Groups reported directly to either Savez Izviđača Srbije, the Serbian Scout Association, or to Savez Izviđača Crne Gore, the Montenegrin Scout Association.

Scout Groups in Serbia and Montenegro tend to be named after people-either from local history or the founders of the Group. Each Scout Group has its own neckerchief, the generally vibrant colors of which are chosen by the members. Scout Groups are led by a Group Commissioner and have a number of Section Leaders responsible for the Cub Scouts, Scouts and Senior Scouts.

The uniform of Savez Izviđača Srbije i Crne Gore consists of a dark-blue cap with the insignia of the SISCG, shirt (violet for Cub Scouts, green for Scouts and Guides, khaki for Venture Scouts, dark blue for Sea Scouts, light blue for Air Scouts), dark blue trousers or shorts; or a skirt or trousers for Guides, a dark blue belt with the insignia of the SISCG on the buckle, neckerchief in the color of the unit, and dark blue socks. In international events, all Scouts are to wear a violet neckerchief with the edges colored like the national flag, with the national coat of arms in the lower outward corner.

The Cub Scout section is for boys and girls aged seven to ten, and is a coeducational section (boys and girls in the same pack). Most Scout Groups have at least two Cub packs, many of which are led by Senior Scouts. The Cub Scout uniform is commonly just the Group neckerchief.

The Scout section is for boys and girls aged 11 to 14. While SISCG is coeducational, there are separate structures for males and females; these are often simply separate patrols, but in the case of larger Groups they are separate troops. The Scout uniform consists of a khaki shirt and the Group neckerchief for both males and females.

The Senior Scout section is for boys and girls aged 14 to 20, and like the Scout Section it has separate structures for males and females; these may be separate patrols, but in the case of larger Groups are separate units. Senior Scouts are referred to in a number of ways, "Explorer Scouts", "Explorers", "Venturers" and "Venture Scouts" are some variants, but the literal translation is Senior Scouts. The Senior Scout uniform consists of a dark green shirt and the Group neckerchief for both males and females.

Specialized River/Sea Scout Groups are also being formed. These follow the same structure as conventional Scout Groups with Cubs, Scouts and Senior Scouts. The uniform consists of a navy blue shirt, a beret and the Group neckerchief for both males and females. Most of the maritime Scouts have connections to the major rivers in Serbia and Montenegro, but there are units elsewhere in the country.

- Cub Scouts (lower grades of primary school, male cubs are known as Poletarci, female are Pčelice)
- Scouts and Guides (higher grades of primary school, Mlađi Izviđači are male and Mlađe Planinke are female)
- Senior (or Venture) Scouts and Guides (high school up to the age of 20, Izviđači are male and Planinke are female)
- Adults (older than 20)
- River/Sea Scouts

The common term for all members, regardless of section, is "Izviđač" (meaning "Scout")

The Scout Motto is Budi Spreman, translating as Be Prepared in Serbian.

==== Scout Oath ====
Dajem časnu riječ da ću čuvati svoju otadžbinu, da prihvatam duhovnu stvarnost i da ću tragati za njenim punijim značenjem, da cu pomagati drugima i da cu živjet i radit po Izviđačkim zakonima.

I commit myself to protect my Fatherland, to accept the spiritual reality and to search for its full meaning, to help others and to live and work in accordance with the Scout Law.

==== Scout Law ====
Izviđač je dobar drug, vedar, društven i nesebičan.
Izviđač je koristan član zajednice u kojoj živi.
Izviđač je čestit, učtiv i kloni se štetnih navika.
Izviđač ceni i razvija duhovne, fizičke i intelektualne vrednosti.
Izviđač je iskren, govori istinu i bori se za nju.
Izviđač je poštuje roditelje i starije, a pomaže mlađim i slabijim.
Izviđač stalno uči i primenjuje stečena znanja i veštine.
Izviđač je vredan, istrajan i ceni rad.
Izviđač voli prirodu, upoznaje je i čuva.
Izviđač odgovorno izvršava zajedničke odluke.

A Scout is a good friend, cheerful, sociable and unselfish.
A Scout is a useful member of the community he/she lives in.
A Scout is honest, polite and stays away from bad habits
A Scout respects and develops spiritual, physical and intellectual values.
A Scout is sincere, tells the truth and fights for it.
A Scout respects parents and adults and helps youngsters.
A Scout learns and uses acquired knowledge.
A Scout is diligent, persistent and appreciates work.
A Scout loves nature, explores it and protects it.
A Scout reliably executes collective decisions.

== Scouting after Yugoslavia ==
In all countries formerly part of Yugoslavia exist independent Scouting organizations, in some of them several. For details see:

- Scouting in Bosnia and Herzegovina
- Scouting in Croatia
- Scouting in the Republic of Macedonia
- Scouting in Montenegro
- Scouting in Serbia
- Scouting in Slovenia
- Scouting and Guiding in Kosovo

== See also ==
- Scouting in displaced persons camps
