= Scouting in Serbia =

The Scout movement in Serbia is served by several independent organizations:

- Savez izviđača Srbije, member of the World Organization of the Scout Movement
- Okružna organizacija skauta Severna Bačka, belonging to the World Federation of Independent Scouts (WFIS)
- Vajdasági Magyar Cserkészszövetség, Hungarian Scouts in Vojvodina linked to Magyar Cserkészszövetség

== See also ==
- Scouting and Guiding in Kosovo
