= Savez Izviđača Crne Gore =

National Scouting organization of Montenegro

Savez Izviđača Crne Gore Савез Извиђача Црне Горе
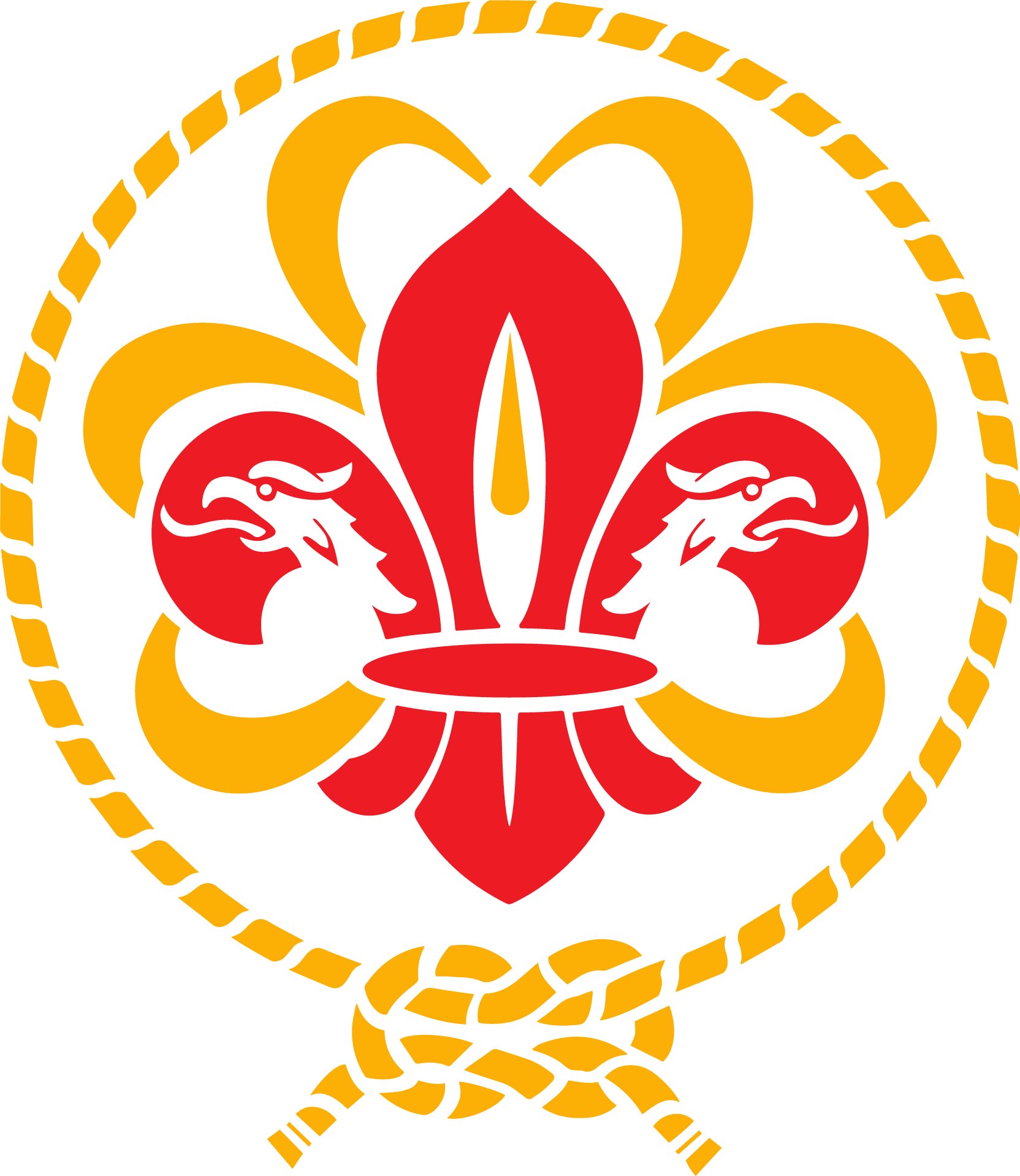
- Scout Association of Montenegro
- Country: Montenegro
- Founded: 19 November 2006
- Membership: 1,100
- Affiliation: World Organization of the Scout Movement
- Website www.scouts.org.me

Savez Izviđača Crne Gore (Montenegrin: Savez Izviđača Crne Gore/Савез Извиђача Црне Горе) is the national Scouting organization of Montenegro. A referendum on independence was held in Republic of Montenegro on May 21, 2006, voting to leave its state union with Serbia by a narrow margin. Montenegro became the world's 192nd recognized sovereign state, which then split the Savez Izviđača Srbije i Crne Gore, as happened with Czechoslovakia in 1993, meaning that Savez Izviđača Crne Gore had to reapply for World Organization of the Scout Movement membership in 2008.

== History ==
The first Scout units in what was to become Yugoslavia were founded in 1911 by Dr. Miloš Popović, in Belgrade, Kragujevac, Vranje and Valjevo. As Yugoslavia, Montenegro served as one of the 20 original signatories that founded the World Organization of the Scout Movement, from 1922 to 1950.

The Russian Scout association Русский Скаут went into exile after World War I, and continued where fleeing White Russian émigrés settled, establishing groups in Serbia.

Scouting was suspended in Montenegro in 1941 after the outbreak of World War II when Yugoslavia was occupied by the Germans. Scouting in Yugoslavia was coopted by the Josip Broz Tito government in 1950, at which time WOSM membership was forfeited, as the new organization did not meet all the criteria for membership, as there were very close connections with the communist government. In 1951, individual Scout associations were founded in all then-Yugoslav republics.

The Scout Association of Yugoslavia was renewed under the former Federal Socialist Republic of Yugoslavia on November 24, 1951 at a meeting held in Zagreb, now in Croatia. Individual branches were created for each constituent republic, and the Scout movement grew and thrived until the Yugoslav dissolution in 1991.

== Present day ==
The previous membership badge of the Savez Izviđača Crne Gore has red as the central petal, and the blue is a lighter shade, to match the old flag. With the 2004 change in the flag of Montenegro, and the 2006 independence referendum, the national badge has changed designs.

Emblem of Savez Izviđača Crne Gore after their independence.

Yugoslavia, as Serbia and Montenegro, returned as the 137th member of the World Organization of the Scout Movement on September 1, 1995. The Association of Scouts of Montenegro has been operating as one part of the Scout Association of Serbia and Montenegro since the establishment of that organization following the collapse of Yugoslavia in 2004. It maintained its own regional structure, but the program and adult support policies were very similar to those in place in Serbia. It participated actively in the Scout Association of Serbia and Montenegro, providing the last chairman of that federation.

In the prevailing situation in the Balkans, the association is very active in social work for all segments of the population, and cooperates closely with the Red Cross in providing aid to refugees, opportunities for the disabled, help for orphans and general aid to areas in crisis. The SICG has recently been featured in news stories about the work they are doing for the environment. The SICG is active in a campaign to introduce new methods and materials of packaging, different schemes for garbage collection and recycling programmes. Serbia and Montenegro fielded a contingent EuroJam 2005.

Following the political separation of Montenegro from Serbia, all parties concerned agreed that the Scout Association of Serbia and Montenegro's membership of WOSM should be transferred to Serbia, and that Montenegro would submit a new application for membership of WOSM. The Association of Scouts of Montenegro was founded on 19 November 2006 as a national independent organization with headquarters in Podgorica, the capital of Montenegro, and registered with the Ministry of Justice. The founding documents list 21 groups and units.

The Savez Izviđača Crne Gore is a voluntary, independent, nonpolitical and social organization of children, youth and adults, for development of their physical, intellectual and spiritual potential. Every citizen of Montenegro could become a member of the Savez Izviđača Crne Gore, if he or she accepts the Program of the Association and acts in accordance with the Scout Laws and regulations of the Constitution of Savez Izviđača Crne Gore, and is active in his or her unit and in the Association.

The President of Savez Izviđača Crne Gore will now be Mr. Vuko Darmanovic from Podgorica, elected President of the SISGC in March 1995. He serves a four-year term.

The Savez Izviđača Crne Gore does not presently own its own centers, nor do the individual Scout Organizations of Montenegro. A number of Scout Groups have their own centers.

Where most countries have a formalized structure of Councils, Districts and Groups, Montenegro has a less formal organization. At the heart of Savez Izviđača Crne Gore are the Groups, typically much bigger than Groups in other countries, containing several Cub packs, Scout troops, and Senior Scout units.

== 2008 WOSM recognition ==
In 2008, the World Scout Bureau received an application for membership of the World Organization from the Association of Scouts of Montenegro. In accordance with the requirements of the Constitution of WOSM, the World Scout Committee considered this application at its meeting on 29 February-2 March 2008, and recommended that it be accepted. Under the terms of Article VI.2 of the WOSM Constitution, “if within three months the recommendation was unopposed or opposed by less than five percent of the Member Organizations”, the Association of Scouts of Montenegro was declared a Member, as the National Scout Organization of Montenegro, of the World Organization of the Scout Movement as from 1 July 2008.

== Serbia and Montenegro National Scout Fellowship ==
The (SAMnet) is the newest of British Scouting's country focussed networks, a forum where members of The Scout Association with a specific interest in Serbia and Montenegro regularly visit the country and work to raise awareness within the UKSA of Scouting there and in the Balkans in general. SAMnet was formed in May 2004 after a Scout Association study visit to the country.

== Program, sections and ideals ==
Already a wide range of topics are covered, including health education, AIDS, environmental activities and citizenship. The following events are witness to the active nature of the Association:

- National celebration of independence with 600 Scouts participating
- Centenary celebration events, including Scouting's Sunrise
- Participation in the World Scout Jamboree as part of the contingent from Serbia and Montenegro
- Regular competition-type events following the pattern of such events in Serbia
- Participation in the renewal of training systems in Serbia to facilitate a similar process in Montenegro
- Participation in sub-regional events of the European Region

The Association of Scouts of Montenegro has 1,100 youth members between the ages of 12 and 20. There are 384 Cub Scouts, 528 Scouts, 188 Rover Scouts as well as adult leaders.

If there are a number of Scout Groups in a locality (such as a city or district) then local Scout Councils may be formed. Groups may belong to Local Scout Councils and/or Regional Scout Organizations, but many Groups report directly to Savez Izviđača Crne Gore, the Montenegrin Scout Association.

Scout Groups in Montenegro tend to be named after people-either from local history or the founders of the Group. Each Scout Group has its own neckerchief, the generally vibrant colors of which are chosen by the members. Scout Groups are led by a Group Commissioner and have a number of Section Leaders responsible for the Cub Scouts, Scouts, and Senior Scouts.

The uniform of Savez Izviđača Crne Gore consists of a dark-blue cap with the insignia of the SICG, shirt (violet for Cub Scouts, green for Scouts and Guides, khaki for Venture Scouts, dark blue for Sea Scouts, light blue for Air Scouts), dark blue trousers or shorts; or a skirt or trousers for Guides, a dark blue belt with the insignia of the SICG on the buckle, neckerchief in the color of the unit, and dark blue socks. In international events, all Scouts are to wear a violet neckerchief with the edges colored like the national flag, with the national coat of arms in the lower outward corner. With the 2004 change in the flag of Montenegro, and the 2006 independence referendum, the present membership badge of the Savez Izviđača Crne Gore has changed to reflect the new national colors.

The Cub Scout section is for boys and girls aged seven to ten, and is a coeducational section (boys and girls in the same pack). Most Scout Groups have at least two Cub packs, many of which are led by Senior Scouts. The Cub Scout uniform is commonly just the Group neckerchief.

The Scout section is for boys and girls aged 11 to 14. While SICG is coeducational, there are separate structures for males and females; these are often simply separate patrols, but in the case of larger Groups they are separate troops. The Scout uniform consists of a khaki shirt and the Group neckerchief for both males and females.

The Senior Scout section is for boys and girls aged 14 to 20, and like the Scout Section it has separate structures for males and females; these may be separate patrols, but in the case of larger Groups are separate units. Senior Scouts are referred to in a number of ways, "Explorer Scouts", "Explorers", "Venturers" and "Venture Scouts" are some variants, but the literal translation is Senior Scouts. The Senior Scout uniform consists of a dark green shirt and the Group neckerchief for both males and females.

Specialized River/Sea Scout Groups are also being formed. These follow the same structure as conventional Scout Groups with Cubs, Scouts and Senior Scouts. The uniform consists of a navy blue shirt, a beret and the Group neckerchief for both males and females. Most of the maritime Scouts have connections to the major rivers in Montenegro, but there are units elsewhere in the country.

- Cub Scouts (lower grades of primary school, male cubs are known as Poletarci, female are Pčelice)
- Scouts and Guides (higher grades of primary school, Mlađi Izviđači are male and Mlađe Planinke are female)
- Senior (or Venture) Scouts and Guides (high school up to the age of 20, Izviđači are male and Planinke are female)
- Adults (older than 20)
- River/Sea Scouts

The common term for all members, regardless of section, is "Izviđač" (meaning "Scout")

The Scout Motto is Буди Спреман (Budi Spreman), translating as "Be Prepared" in Serbian.

=== Scout Oath ===
Dajem časnu riječ da ću čuvati svoju otadžbinu, da prihvatam duhovnu stvarnost i da ću tragati za njenim punijim značenjem, da ću pomagati drugima i da ću živjeti i raditi po Izviđačkim zakonima.

I commit myself to protect my Fatherland, to accept the spiritual reality and to search for its full meaning, to help others and to live and work in accordance with the Scout Law.

=== Scout Law ===
1. Izviđač je dobar drug, vjedar, društven i nesebičan. (A Scout is a good friend, cheerful, sociable and unselfish.)
2. Izviđač je koristan član zajednice u kojoj živi. (A Scout is a useful member of the community they live in.)
3. Izviđač je čestit, učtiv i kloni se štetnih navika. (A Scout is honest, polite and stays away from bad habits)
4. Izviđač cijeni i razvija duhovne, fizičke i intelektualne vrijednosti. (A Scout respects and develops spiritual, physical and intellectual values.)
5. Izviđač je iskren, govori istinu i bori se za nju. (A Scout is sincere, tells the truth and fights for it.)
6. Izviđač je poštuje roditelje i starije, a pomaže mlađim i slabijim. (A Scout respects parents and adults and help the young and the weak.)
7. Izviđač stalno uči i primenjuje stečena znanja i vještine. (A Scout continuously learns and uses acquired knowledge and ability.)
8. Izviđač je vrijedan, istrajan i cijeni rad. (A Scout is diligent, persistent and appreciates work.)
9. Izviđač voli prirodu, upoznaje je i čuva. (A Scout loves nature, respects it and protects it.)
10. Izviđač odgovorno izvršava zajedničke odluke. (A Scout reliably executes collective decisions.)

== See also ==
- Savez Izviđača Srbije
- Savez Izviđača Srbije i Crne Gore
