= Debelo Brdo =

Debelo Brdo may refer to:

- Debelo Brdo (mountain pass), on the Povlen in Serbia
- Debelo Brdo, Bosnia and Herzegovina, a village near Žepče
- Debelo Brdo, Croatia, a village near Udbina
- Debelo Brdo I, a village near Gospić, Croatia
- Debelo Brdo II, a village near Gospić, Croatia
