= Miloš Popović =

Miloš Popović may refer to:

- Miloš Popović (physician), Serbian physician who was the founder of the Yugoslav Scouting organization
- Miloš Popović (footballer), Montenegrin football player
- Miloš Popović (footballer, born 2004), Serbian footballer
