= Savez Izviđača Srbije =

National Scouting organization of Serbia

Savez Izviđača Srbije Савез Извиђача Србије
- Scout Association of Serbia
- Country: Serbia
- Founded: November 24, 1951
- Membership: 3,773
- Affiliation: World Organization of the Scout Movement
- Website http://izvidjaci.rs/

Savez Izviđača Srbije (Serbian: Савез Извиђача Србије, lit. 'Scout Association of Serbia') is the primary national Scouting organization of Serbia. A referendum on independence was held in Montenegro on May 21, 2006, voting to leave its state union with Serbia by a narrow margin.

Montenegro became the world's 193rd recognized sovereign state, which has then split the Savez Izviđača Srbije i Crne Gore (Scout Association of Serbia and Montenegro), as happened with Czechoslovakia in 1993, meaning that the membership in the World Organization of the Scout Movement was transferred to Savez Izviđača Srbije.

== History ==
historic badge shows the old coat of arms of the Kingdom of Yugoslavia

The first Scout units in what was to become Yugoslavia were founded in 1911 by Dr. Miloš Popović, in Belgrade, Kragujevac, Vranje and Valjevo. As Kingdom of Yugoslavia, Serbia served as one of the 20 original signatories that founded the World Organization of the Scout Movement, from 1922 to 1950.

The Russian Scout association Русский Скаут went into exile after World War I, and continued where fleeing White Russian émigrés settled, establishing groups in Serbia.

The outbreak of World War II saw the suspension of Scouting in Serbia in 1941, when Yugoslavia was occupied by the Germans. Scouting in Yugoslavia was co-opted by the Tito government in 1950, at which time WOSM membership was forfeited, as the new organization did not meet all the criteria for membership, as there were very close connections with the communist government. In 1951, individual Scout associations were founded in all then-Yugoslav republics.

The Scout Association of Yugoslavia was renewed under the former Federal Socialist Republic of Yugoslavia on November 24, 1951 at a meeting held in Zagreb, now in Croatia. Individual branches were created for each constituent republic, and the Scout movement grew and thrived until the Yugoslav dissolution in 1991.

== Present day ==
Yugoslavia, as Serbia and Montenegro, returned as the 137th member of the World Organization of the Scout Movement on September 1, 1995. In the prevailing situation in the Balkans, the association is very active in social work for all segments of the population, and cooperates closely with the Red Cross in providing aid to refugees, opportunities for the disabled, help for orphans and general aid to areas in crisis. The SIS has recently been featured in news stories about the work they are doing for the environment. The SIS is active in a campaign to introduce new methods and materials of packaging, different schemes for garbage collection and recycling programmes. Serbia and Montenegro fielded a contingent EuroJam 2005.

The Savez Izviđača Srbije is a voluntary, independent, nonpolitical and social organization of children, youth and adults, for development of their physical, intellectual and spiritual potential. Every citizen of Serbia could become a member of the Savez Izviđača Srbije, if he or she accepts the Program of the Association and acts in accordance with the Scout Laws and regulations of the Constitution of Savez Izviđača Srbije, and is active in his or her unit and in the Association.

The President of Savez Izviđača Srbije is Mr. Nikola Petrović from Kraljevo, the former Vice-President elected in March 1995. He serves a four-year term.

The Savez Izviđača Srbije does not presently own its own centers, nor do the individual Scout Organizations of Serbia. A number of Scout Groups have their own centers, including groups in Buljarice, Debelo Brdo, and Brezovica.

== Regional Scouting divisions ==
Where most countries have a formalized structure of Councils, Districts and Groups, Serbia has a less formal organization. At the heart of Savez Izviđača Srbije are the Groups, typically much bigger than Groups in other countries, containing several Cub packs, Scout troops and Senior Scout units. For example, the France Prešern Group in Belgrade, founded in 1957, has had over 11,000 members, over 200 new members a year.

=== Savez Izviđača Vojvodine ===
Logo of Savez Izviđača Vojvodine

The Scout Association of Vojvodina (Serbian: Savez Izviđača Vojvodine/Савез Извиђача Војводине, Hungarian: Vajdasági Cserkészek, Croatian: Savez Izviđača Vojvodine) has been active since 1911, when the first local Scout units were founded in Novi Sad, Pančevo, Subotica and other places. The Scout Association of Vojvodina, which has around 2000 members, unites the work of 35 Scout units from towns and villages across Vojvodina. The work of the Scout Association of Vojvodina includes camps, various activities, training of leaders, meetings, seminars, and competitions, Scout jamborees of Vojvodina gathering up to 2000 participants, orienteering all-around competitions, an international Scout artists' colony, and the Eurostep program, including an Eco-camp in Pančevo, the Archeology camp in Sremska Mitrovica, the International Scout Artists' Colony in Kovačica and the Camp for River Scouts in Kanjiža.

=== Local Scout Councils ===
If there are a number of Scout Groups in a locality (such as a city or district), local Scout Councils may be formed. There are City Scout Councils in Belgrade and Niš and 12 District Scout Councils around Serbia in Ada, Požarevac, Velika Plana, Bačka Topola, Rakovica, Vranje, Čukarica, Šabac, Zaječar, Kruševac, Subotica and Zvezdara.

== UK - Serbia and Montenegro National Scout Fellowship ==
The UK - Serbia and Montenegro National Scout Fellowship (SAMnet) is the newest of United Kingdom Scout Association's country focused networks, a forum where members of The Scout Association with a specific interest in Serbia and Montenegro regularly visit the country and work to raise awareness within the UKSA of Scouting there and in the Balkans in general. SAMnet was formed in May 2004 after a Scout Association study visit to the country.

== Program, sections and ideals ==
Groups may belong to Local Scout Councils and/or Regional Scout Organizations, but many Groups report directly to Savez Izviđača Srbije.

Scout Groups in Serbia tend to be named after people - either from local history or the founders of the Group. Each Scout Group has its own neckerchief, the generally vibrant colors of which are chosen by the members. Scout Groups are led by a Group Commissioner and have a number of Section Leaders responsible for the Cub Scouts, Scouts and Senior Scouts.

The uniform of Savez Izviđača Srbije consists of a dark-blue cap with the insignia of the SIS, shirt (violet for Cub Scouts, green for Scouts and Guides, khaki for Venture Scouts, dark blue for Sea Scouts, light blue for Air Scouts), dark blue trousers or shorts; or a skirt or trousers for Guides, a dark blue belt with the insignia of the SIS on the buckle, neckerchief in the color of the unit, and dark blue socks. In international events, all Scouts are to wear a violet neckerchief with the edges colored like the national flag, with the national coat of arms in the lower outward corner. The membership badge of the Savez Izviđača Srbije incorporates the color scheme of the flag of Serbia.

The Cub Scout section is for boys and girls aged seven to ten, and is a mixed-sex education section (boys and girls in the same pack). Most Scout Groups have at least two Cub packs, many of which are led by Senior Scouts. The Cub Scout uniform is commonly just the Group neckerchief.

The Scout section is for boys and girls aged 11 to 14. While SIS is coeducational, there are separate structures for males and females; these are often simply separate patrols, but in the case of larger Groups they are separate troops. The Scout uniform consists of a khaki shirt and the Group neckerchief for both males and females.

The Senior Scout section is for boys and girls aged 14 to 20, and like the Scout Section it has separate structures for males and females; these may be separate patrols, but in the case of larger Groups are separate units. Senior Scouts are referred to in a number of ways, "Explorer Scouts", "Explorers", "Venturers" and "Venture Scouts" are some variants, but the literal translation is Senior Scouts. The Senior Scout uniform consists of a dark green shirt and the Group neckerchief for both males and females.

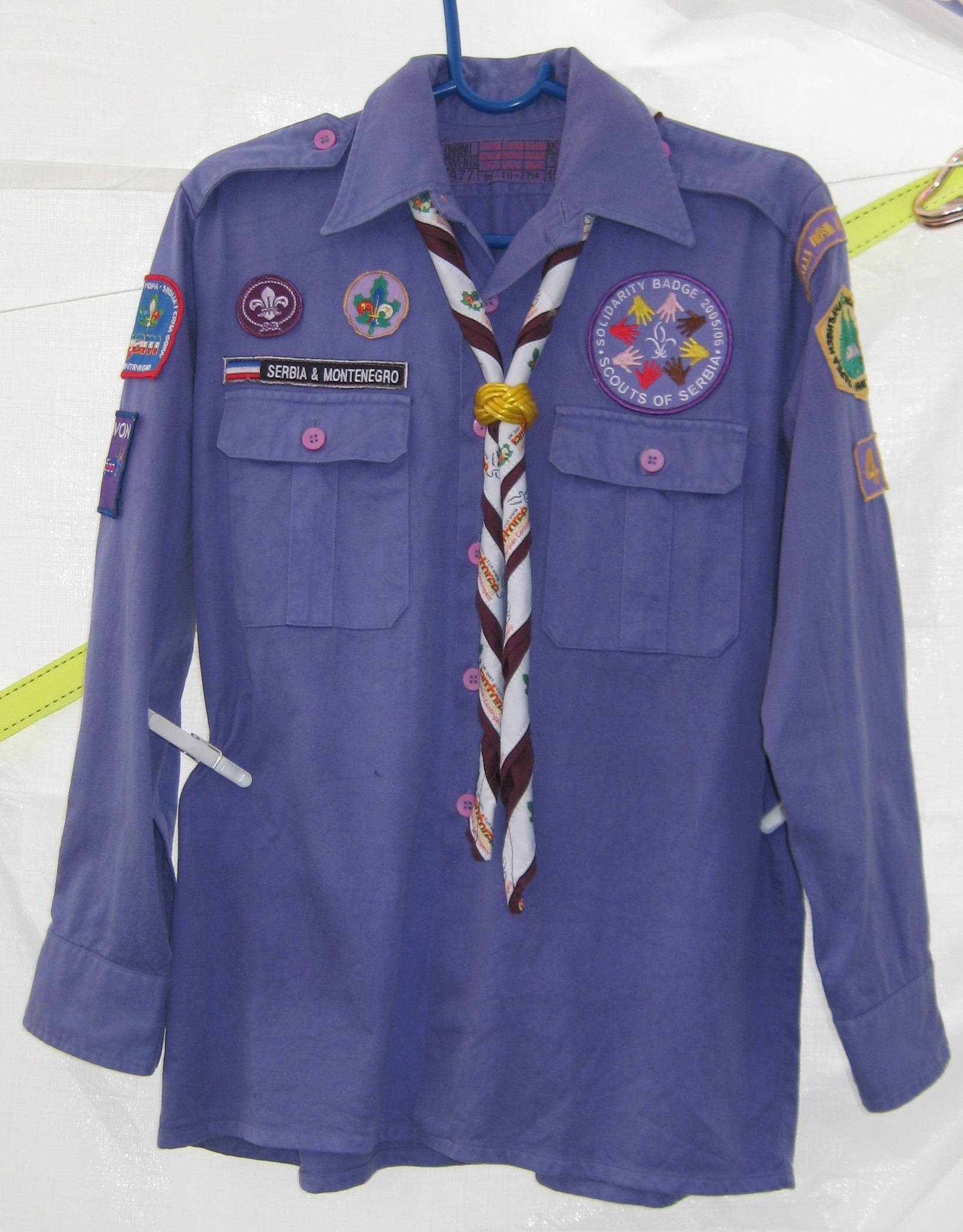
Sea Scout uniform

Specialized River/Sea Scout Groups are also being formed. These follow the same structure as conventional Scout Groups with Cubs, Scouts and Senior Scouts. The uniform consists of a navy blue shirt, a beret and the Group neckerchief for both males and females. Most of the maritime Scouts have connections to the major rivers in Serbia, but there are units elsewhere in the country.

- Cub Scouts (lower grades of primary school, male cubs are known as Poletarci, female are Pčelice)
- Scouts and Guides (higher grades of primary school, Mlađi Izviđači are male and Mlađe Planinke are female)
- Senior (or Venture) Scouts and Guides (high school up to the age of 20, Izviđači are male and Planinke are female)
- Adults (older than 20)
- River/Sea Scouts

The common term for all members, regardless of section, is "Izviđač" (meaning "Scout").

The Scout Motto is Буди Спреман (Budi Spreman), translating as "Be Prepared" in Serbian.

=== Scout Oath ===
Dajem časnu reč da ću čuvati svoju otadžbinu, da prihvatam duhovnu stvarnost i da ću tragati za njenim punijim značenjem, da ću pomagati drugima i da ću živjeti i raditi po Izviđačkim zakonima.

I commit myself to protect my Fatherland, to accept the spiritual reality and to search for its full meaning, to help others and to live and work in accordance with the Scout Law.

=== Scout Law ===
1. Izviđač je dobar drug, vedar, društven i nesebičan. (A Scout is a good friend, cheerful, sociable and unselfish.)
2. Izviđač je koristan član zajednice u kojoj živi. (A Scout is a useful member of the community he/she lives in.)
3. Izviđač je čestit, učtiv i kloni se štetnih navika. (A Scout is honest, polite and stays away from bad habits)
4. Izviđač ceni i razvija duhovne, fizičke i intelektualne vrednosti. (A Scout respects and develops spiritual, physical and intellectual values.)
5. Izviđač je iskren, govori istinu i bori se za nju. (A Scout is sincere, tells the truth and fights for it.)
6. Izviđač je poštuje roditelje i starije, a pomaže mlađim i slabijim. (A Scout respects parents and adults and helps youngsters.)
7. Izviđač stalno uči i primenjuje stečena znanja i veštine. (A Scout learns and uses acquired knowledge.)
8. Izviđač je vredan, istrajan i ceni rad. (A Scout is diligent, persistent and appreciates work.)
9. Izviđač voli prirodu, upoznaje je i čuva. (A Scout loves nature, respects it and protects it.)
10. Izviđač odgovorno izvršava zajedničke odluke. (A Scout reliably executes collective decisions.)

== See also ==
- Scouting in Serbia
- Savez Izviđača Crne Gore
- Savez Izviđača Srbije i Crne Gore
