= Savez izviđača Bosne i Hercegovine =

National Scouting organization of Bosnia and Herzegovina

Savez izviđača u Bosne i Hercegovine
- Scout Association of Bosnia and Herzegovina
- Country: Bosnia and Herzegovina
- Founded: 17 December 2011
- Membership: 1,250
- President: Dragan Gnjatić
- Vice President: Emira Kršlak
- Affiliation: World Organization of the Scout Movement

The Savez izviđača u Bosne i Hercegovine (Scout Association in Bosnia and Herzegovina) is the state Scouting organisation of Bosnia and Herzegovina. It was founded on 17 December 2011 through the merger of the three constituent organisation of its predecessor, the Savjet izviđačkih organizacija u Bosni i Hercegovini (Council of Scout Associations in Bosnia and Herzegovina), which was a member of the World Organization of the Scout Movement since 1999. The coeducational Council of Scout Associations in Bosnia and Herzegovina has 1,250 members as of 2011.

== Program sections ==
- Cub Scouts/Poletarac-ages 7 to 10
- Scouts/Izviđači-ages 11 to 20

== History of Scouting in Bosnia ==
In his book, What Scouts Can Do: More Yarns, Baden-Powell wrote about Bosnia before the First World War; in a section "Biking in Bosnia" he provides a fascinating picture of this war-torn land. Bosnia-Herzegovina, as part of Yugoslavia, helped found the World Organization of the Scout Movement in 1922 and remained a member until Scouting in Yugoslavia was coopted by the SFR Yugoslavia in 1950 into Savez Izviđača Jugoslavije, at which time WOSM membership was forfeited.

The Council of Scout Associations in Bosnia and Herzegovina comprised the Savez Izviđača Federacije Bosne i Hercegovine (Scout Association of the Federation of Bosnia and Herzegovina) and the Savez Izviđača Republike Srpske (Scout Association of the Republic of Srpska). Both Scout Associations agreed to work together to form a federation and join WOSM together, and met to finalize matters presented to WOSM for consideration of membership. WOSM granted full membership to Bosnia and Herzegovina in July 1999. In 2000, after the establishment of the Brčko District, a third association, the Savez izviđača Distrikta Brčko (Scout Association of the Brčko District) joined the council.

In 2011, the three member organizations of the council agreed to form a unified association, the Savez izviđača Bosne i Hercegovine (Scout Association of Bosnia and Herzegovina). The Scout Motto is Буди Спреман (Budi Spreman), translating as "Be Prepared" in the dialect of each ethnic group. The noun for a single Scout is interchangeably Skaut and Izviđač.

== Emblems ==
The membership badge of the council is often seen in black-and-white so as not to show ethnic leaning of the various groups. The emblem of Savez Izviđača Federacije Bosne i Hercegovine incorporates the gold-on-green color scheme of the coat of arms of the Federation of Bosnia and Herzegovina on the maple leaf design of the original Savez Izviđača Jugoslavije. The emblem of Savez Izviđača Republike Srpske incorporates elements of the coat of arms of Republika Srpska.
