= Sojuz na Izvidnici na Makedonija =

National Scouting organization of the Republic of North Macedonia

Сојуз на извидници на Македонија
- Scout Association of Macedonia
- Headquarters: Bulevar Ilinden bb
- Location: Skopje
- Country: North Macedonia
- Founded: 1953
- Membership: 3010
- President: Miko Stojanovski
- Affiliation: World Organization of the Scout Movement
- Website

Sojuz na Izvidnici na Makedonija (Macedonian: Сојуз на извидници на Македонија; English: The Scout Association of Macedonia), is the national scouting organization of Republic of North Macedonia. It became a member of the World Organization of the Scout Movement in 1997. The coeducational Sojuz na Izvidnici na Makedonija has 3010 members as of 2023.

== History ==
Scouting activities in today's North Macedonia began in 1921 under the Kingdom of Yugoslavia with the formation of groups known as stegs in the cities of Skopje, Veles, Kumanovo, Štip, Strumica, Bitola, and Struga. As part of Yugoslavia, then Socialist Republic Macedonia was a founding member of the World Organization of the Scout Movement from 1922 to 1948. In this period, summer camps, courses and other Scouting events were held. Until 1941, Macedonian youth was organized in Scouts and Falcons, the Sokol movement in Yugoslavia.

Scouting in Yugoslavia was coopted by the Tito government in 1950, at which time WOSM membership was forfeited. In November, 1953 Sojuz na Izvidnici na Makedonija was officially founded, on the initiative of former Scout organization members, as a branch of the Yugoslav Scout association Savez Izviđača Jugoslavije, which it remained until the breakup of Yugoslavia.

Immediately after Macedonia had proclaimed independence on September 8, 1991, Sojuz na Izvidnici na Makedonija members made efforts to be admitted to the World Organization of the Scout Movement (WOSM). Sojuz na Izvidnici na Makedonija was officially declared an independent, nonpolitical and nongovernmental organization of young people in 1993. North Macedonia became a full member of the World Organization membership on July 25, 1997.

The Scout Association of Macedonia is active in community development programs and engage large number of young people in social projects. It is a key player in the civil society and full member organization of the National Youth Council of Macedonia.

Along with the numerous project and programs, the Scout Association of Macedonia is traditionally organising the following brand programs:

National Scout League

DION (State Scout Orienteering Competition)

Macedonian Scout Jamboree

Youth Academy

As of 2023, Sojuz na Izvidnici na Makedonija had 3010 registered Scouts, male and female, assigned in 24 units all over the country.

The primary geographic structure of Sojuz na Izvidnici na Makedonija is the District, generally conforming to Skopje, Kumanovo, Veles, Sveti Nikole, Kriva Palanka, Štip, Kocani, Prilep, Ohrid, Struga, Kicevo, Bitola, and Tetovo boundaries.

Today, SIM is the largest youth organization in the Republic of North Macedonia.

== Program and ideals ==
- Cub Scouts-7 to 11
- Scouts-12 to 15
- Explorers - 16 to 18
- Rovers-18 to 29

The Scout Motto is Биди Подготвен, translating as Be Prepared in Macedonian.

The membership badge of Sojuz na Izvidnici na Makedonija Scout emblem incorporates the national colors of the flag of North Macedonia on the maple leaf design of the original Savez Izviđača Jugoslavije.

The Scout Association of Macedonia is active in community development programs and engage large number of young people in social projects. It is key player in the civil society and full member organization of the National Youth Council of Macedonia.

Along with the numerous project and programs the Scout Association of Macedonia is traditionally organising the following brand programs:

National Scout League

DION (State Scout Orienteering Competition)

Macedonian Scout Jamboree

Youth Academy

The Scout Association of Macedonia is owner of the biggest youth training center in the country located in the shore of the Lake Ohrid. The center is open for commercial use and function as social enterprise with all profit invest in Scouting.

== Scout Law ==
The Scout laws are:

- A Scout should be trusted. (На извидникот му е чест да му веруваат)
- A Scout is helpful. (извидникот е корисен)
- A Scout is a good friend. (Извнидникот е добар другар)
- A Scout is courteous. (Извидникот е учтив)
- A Scout is an optimist (Извидникот е оптимист)
- A Scout is faithful and responsible. (Извидникот е верен и одговорен)
- A Scout studies hard and uses knowledge. (Извидникот постојано учи да ги применува стекнатите знаења)
- A Scout respects the nature. (Извидникот ја цени природата)
- A Scout respects and develops spiritual and cultural values. (Извнидникот ги цени и развива духовните и културните вредности)
- A Scout is one in thought, talk and deeds. (Извидникот е во мислите, зборовите и делата)
