= Hungarian Scout Association in Vojvodina =

Vajdasági Magyar Cserkészszövetség
- Headquarters: Horgoš, Serbia
- Country: Serbia
- Founded: 5 May 1992
- Executive manager: István Bacskulin
- Website; Website of the Hungarian Scout Association in Vojvodina

The Hungarian Scout Association in Vojvodina (Hungarian: Vajdasági Magyar Cserkészszövetség, VMCSSZ) is the Scouting organization of the Hungarians in Vojvodina, Serbia. Currently, there are 37 Scout groups operating in 5 districts.

== History ==
The whole of the Hungarian Scouting started bound to Nagybecskerek (now Zrenjanin), where, in 1910, a 134-page study was published on the English Scouting in the bulletin of the local grammar school. After this study, Scout groups started to form throughout the Kingdom of Hungary.

This momentum was broken by the Treaty of Trianon, as the Hungarian Scout groups in Vojvodina (then Yugoslavia) had to continue their work isolated from and without co-ordination with the Scout groups remaining in Hungary and other territories detached from the Kingdom of Hungary. In 1928, the Scout Association of Yugoslavia was founded and Hungarian Scouts could work in its frame-work. In 1941, after the re-capture of Vojvodina by Hungary, the Scout movement gained a new a momentum re-integrated into the Hungarian Scout Association. At the end of World War II, the southern territories of Hungary were seized again by Yugoslavia and with the advance of communist regime scouting was disbanded.

Hungarian Scouting in Vojvodina began to re-organize in 1988. On 5 May 1992, the Yugoslav Ministry of Interior approved the public work of the Hungarian Scout Association in Vojvodina.
