= Scout Association of Croatia =

National Scouting organization of Croatia

Savez izviđača Hrvatske
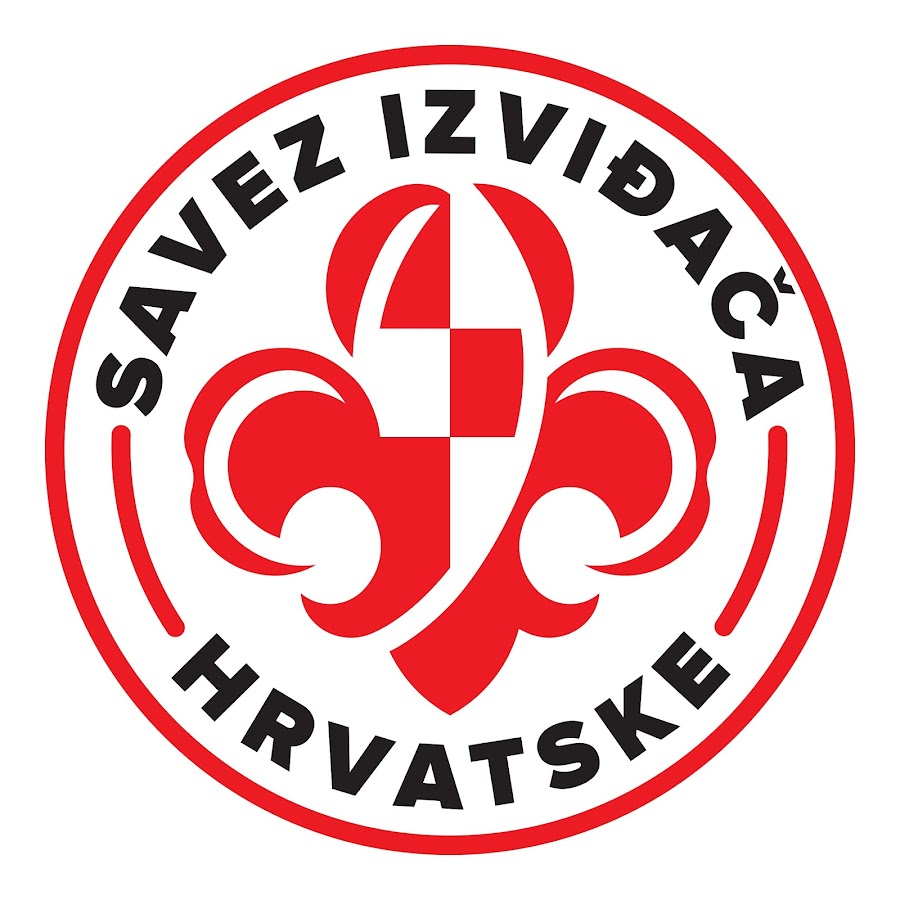
- Scout Association of Croatia
- Country: Croatia
- Founded: 1951
- Membership: 3,827
- Affiliation: World Organization of the Scout Movement
- Website scouts.hr

Scout Association of Croatia (Croatian: Savez izviđača Hrvatske, SiH) is the Croatian national Scouting organization. As part of Yugoslavia, Croatia was a founding member of the World Organization of the Scout Movement from 1922 to 1948. Independently, Croatia has been a member of the World Organization since 1993, and joined the World Association of Girl Guides and Girl Scouts in 2023, making it a "Scout & Guide National Organization". The coeducational Savez Izviđača Hrvatske has 3,827 members as of 2011.

== Early history ==
Prior to the origination of Scouting, Austria had the Scholar Excursion Society, established in Vinkovci in 1881. Similar to other organizations in then Austro-Hungary and which later appeared in other parts of Croatia, the Scholar Excursion Society provided experiences similar to Scouting to children as early military preparation. Scouting was first established in the region in Budapest in 1910. Scouting units spread from there, first into Istria (then under Italian control) in 1911. Scouting spreading from there into resort areas and other major cities. In 1913 German-speaking Sea Scout units were founded in Rijeka and Pula. In 1914 Egon de Lund founded the First Austria Sea Scout Corps (Erste Österreichisches Seepfadfinderkorps) in Mali Lošinj at the Nautical School (k.k.Nautische Schule). In 1918 a further Austrian Sea Scout Corps was founded in Opatija. Together with the Austrian Sea Scouts in Trieste these groups formed the geographical division Austrian Coastland (Landesverband Küstenland) of the Austrian National Scout organization Österreichischer Pfadfinderbund. In 1918 all units of this geographical division were disbanded. Scouts in these areas assisted during World War I by helping refugees and battling fires, among other wartime needs.

Scouting continued to expand after the end of the war, and in 1922 a Scout Parish was created in Osijek for Croatia and Slovenia. According to the Parish journal, Scout, in 1923 Croatia had 14 groups of Scouts. The first meetings of the World Scout Movement and WAGGGS, in 1922 and 1928 respectively, were attended by Yugoslavian Scouts.

== Political interference ==
In Yugoslavia, the king took patronage of the Scouts in 1923, but six years later the organization was banned along with others that did not include the word 'Yugoslav' in their titles. Scouts in Croatia continued with the checkerboard pattern from the coat of arms of Croatia as their emblem and standing openly against the monarchy. Scouts were banned in Croatia in 1946, after Young Pioneers began to appear during World War II in Partisan territory.

Scouting in Yugoslavia was coopted by the Tito government in 1950, at which time WOSM membership was forfeited, but Scouts continued in conjunction with the Pioneers. The Croatian Scouts' Day, recognized on May 19, commemorates the first training of Pioneer-Scouts in camp and excursion leadership, held from May 19 to May 25, 1950. Trainees in Zagreb worked from Vožatago, a Russian manual that had been modified from the Scout handbook. These training sessions spread the Pioneer-Scouts across the region.

On November 24, 1951, the Scout Association of Yugoslavia, Savez Izviđača Jugoslavije, was established in Zagreb. The Scout movement grew and thrived until the Yugoslav breakup in 1991. Croatian Scouts again joined defense efforts, during which many were killed.

== Scouting since break with Yugoslavia ==
On June 2, 1991, Savez Izviđača Hrvatske broke ties with the Scout Association of Yugoslavia and reorganized, returning to its earlier principles of youth education. It received recognition by numerous western nations. On July 19, 1993, World Organization of the Scout Movement voted the Savez Izviđača Hrvatske to full membership. Croatian Scouts have participated internationally in Jamborees, including the 1st and 2nd European Scout Jamboree in 1994 and 2005 respectively, the 1996 Danish Jamboree, and every World Scout Jamboree since 1995.

There were 3,865 Scouts in 1998, and as of 2005 the count was 4,068.

The checkerboard coat of arms (šahovnica) has been an official symbol of Croatia since 1495.

Among the group's programs is "The Sunrise City Project", which since 1993 offers an annual summer camp intended to assist children impacted by the 1991 war in reintegration to society.

== Program and ideals ==
There are four sections of Scouting based on age:

- Cub Scouts-ages 8 to 11
- Scouts-12 to 15
- Venture Scouts-ages 16 to 20
- Rangers and Rovers-21 on

The Scout Motto is Budi Pripravan, Be Prepared in Croatian. The membership badge of Savez izviđača Hrvatske incorporates the checkerboard pattern of the coat of arms of Croatia.

== International Scout units in Croatia ==
In addition, there are Girl Scouts of the USA Overseas in Zagreb, serviced by way of USAGSO headquarters in New York City, as well as American Cub Scouts and Boy Scouts, linked to the Horizon District of the Transatlantic Council of the Boy Scouts of America, which supports units in west-and-central Europe, the Near East and North Africa.

== Sources ==
- Scouting in Croatia
- A Chronicle of Scouting in Eastern Europe and Russia
