= István Bacskulin =

Serbian politician

István Bacskulin (Serbian Cyrillic: Иштван Бачкулин, romanized: Ištvan Bačkulin; born 3 March 1958) is a Serbian politician from the country's Hungarian community. He was the mayor of Kanjiža from 1993 to 2000 and served in the Vojvodina provincial assembly from 1993 to 2004. From 2012 to 2016, he led the community government of Horgoš, a settlement in Kanjiža.

== Private career ==
Bacskulin is a viticulturist and a certified winemaker. He is the grand master of the Saint Orbán Wine Knights in Horgoš, and in May 2025 he was the organizer of the 13th Hungarian National Wine Competition.

== Politician ==
=== Mayor (1993–2000) and Provincial Representative (1993–2004) ===
==== Democratic Fellowship of Vojvodina Hungarians ====
Serbia's first local elections after the country's de jure return to multi-party democracy in 1990 took place in May 1992. In Kanjiža, the Democratic Fellowship of Vojvodina Hungarians (VMDK), which was at the time the dominant party in Serbia's Hungarian community, did not participate in the election, and a large percentage of the municipality's majority Hungarian community boycotted the vote, giving the Socialist Party of Serbia (SPS) a victory on the basis of a relatively small turnout. When repeat elections took place in December 1992, the VMDK contested the vote and won a landslide victory with twenty-eight out of thirty-three seats. Bacskulin was elected as a VMDK candidate for a Horgoš constituency; when the new municipal assembly convened on 21 January 1993, he was chosen as its president, a position that was at the time equivalent to mayor.

Bacskulin was also elected to the Vojvodina assembly in the December 1992 provincial election, which took place concurrently with the local vote. Running in Kanjiža's second division, he received 64.8% support in a race against two opponents. The governing Socialists won a plurality victory overall and remained in power for the term that followed.

In the 1993 Serbian parliamentary election, Bacskulin appeared in the twelfth position on the VMDK's electoral list for the Zrenjanin division, which included Kanjiža. The party won five seats in the division, and he was not awarded a mandate. (From 1992 to 2000, Serbia's electoral law stipulated that one-third of parliamentary mandates would be assigned to candidates from successful lists in numerical order, while the remaining two-thirds would be distributed amongst other candidates at the discretion of the sponsoring parties. It was common practice for the latter mandates to be awarded out of order. Bacskulin could have been awarded a mandate despite his list position, but this did not occur.)

==== Alliance of Vojvodina Hungarians ====
The VMDK experienced a serious split in 1994, with several of its leading members leaving to form the breakaway Alliance of Vojvodina Hungarians (VMSZ). Bacskulin was a founding member of the new party, which soon supplanted the VMDK as the dominant party in Serbia's Hungarian community. In the 1996 Serbian local elections in Kanjiža, an alliance of the VMSZ and the Reform Democratic Party of Vojvodina (RDSV) won twenty-four out of thirty-three seats, while the VMDK did not win any representation. Bacskulin was personally re-elected for the municipality's fourth division in the first round of voting and was chosen afterward for a second term as mayor.

Bacskulin was also re-elected to the Vojvodina assembly in the 1996 provincial election, once again winning re-election for Kanjiža's second division in the first round of voting. The Socialist Party won a majority victory, and the VMSZ served in opposition for the term that followed.

In the 1997 Serbian parliamentary election, Bacskulin appeared in the second position on the VMSZ's electoral list for the smaller, redistributed Zrenjanin division. The party won a single seat in the division, which automatically went to its lead candidate, Mihály Szecsei.

Toward the end of his mayoral term, Bacskulin said that his administration's greatest accomplishment was maintaining peace in Kanjiža during the Yugoslav Wars of the 1990s. He added that his greatest challenge during eight years in office was preserving the local education system.

In 2000, the VMSZ became part of the Democratic Opposition of Serbia (DOS), a broad and ideologically diverse coalition of parties opposed to the authoritarian rule of SPS leader Slobodan Milošević. DOS candidate Vojislav Koštunica defeated Milošević in the 2000 Yugoslavian presidential election, and Milošević subsequently fell from power on 5 October 2000 against the backdrop of mass protests.

The VMSZ won a majority victory in Kanjiža in the 2000 Serbian local elections, which were held concurrently with the Yugoslavian vote, taking nineteen out of thirty-three seats. Bacskulin was not personally re-elected, however; he was defeated by candidate of a local political group called the Producers of Horgoš, and his mayoral term ended when the new assembly convened. This notwithstanding, he was elected to a third term in the Vojvodina assembly in the 2000 provincial election, again winning re-election for Kanjiža's second division in the first round. The combined forces of the DOS and VMSZ won a landslide majority victory overall, and Bacskulin served as a provincial deputy secretary of agriculture during the 2000–04 term.

The Serbian government fell soon after Slobodan Milošević's defeat in the Yugoslavian election, and a new Serbian parliamentary election was held in December 2000. Prior to the vote, Serbia's electoral laws were reformed such that the entire country became a single division and all mandates were awarded to candidates on successful lists at the discretion of the sponsoring parties, irrespective of numerical order. The VMSZ participated in the election as part of the DOS alliance, and Bacskulin appeared in the 219th position out of 250 on its electoral list. The list won a landslide majority with 176 seats, and he was not initially chosen for a mandate.

Bacskulin was awarded a parliamentary mandate under somewhat dubious circumstances on 12 June 2002. The DOS leadership invalidated the mandates of several delegates from the Democratic Party of Serbia (DSS), which had previously been one of the leading parties in the coalition but was by this time in the process of withdrawing from it. Bacskulin was one of the DOS candidates chosen for a replacement mandate. The DOS's actions were later invalidated on a legal technicality, and the DSS mandates were restored.

The DOS later dissolved entirely, and the VMSZ contested the 2003 Serbian parliamentary election as part of a multi-party alliance called Together for Tolerance (ZZT). Bacskulin appeared in the sixteenth position on the coalition's list, which did not cross the electoral threshold for assembly representation.

=== Since 2004 ===
Serbia's local election laws were reformed prior to the 2004 local election cycle, such that mayors were directly elected and local assemblies were elected under a system of proportional representation. Bacskulin was nominated as the VMSZ's mayoral candidate in Kanjiža in 2004 and was defeated by Károly Körmöci of the Reformists of Vojvodina (RV) in the second round of voting. The direct election of mayors proved to be a short-lived experiment and was abolished with the 2008 local elections.

Vojvodina adopted a system of mixed proportional representation for the 2004 provincial election, and Bacskulin appeared in the fourth position on the VMSZ's electoral list. Although the party won six proportional seats, he was not assigned a new mandate after the election, and his term in the provincial assembly came to an end.

After further changes to Serbia's electoral laws in 2011, all mandates in elections held under proportional representation were assigned to candidates on successful lists in numerical order.

Bacskulin left the VMSZ in March 2012. He contested the 2012 Serbian local elections in Kanjiža at the head of an independent list called Válassz Utat (English: Choose the Way) and was re-elected to the municipal assembly after a twelve-year absence when the list won three seats. The VMSZ won the election with eleven out of twenty-nine seats.

Bacskulin was the leader of the Horgoš community government from 2012 to 2016. In 2015, he complained about the effects of Horgoš becoming a transit point for large numbers of Syrian and other refugees seeking to gain access to Hungary. “We understand their problems. In Serbia we understand war and having to flee," he was quoted as saying. “But this is our livelihood. They are destroying it and moving on. Thousands pass this way each day, and if each one takes a few grapes or a couple of peaches, then what will be left?”

He was elected to Serbia's Hungarian National Council in 2014 after appearing in the second position on the VMDK's electoral list, which won two seats. He submitted his resignation from the council on 30 December 2016, and the resignation was formally accepted on 23 February 2017.

Bacskulin appeared in the second position on an independent list called Ukrok in the 2016 local election in Kanjiža and was re-elected to the municipal assembly when the list won six seats, finishing second against the VMSZ. He did not seek re-election in 2020.

== Electoral record ==
=== Provincial (Vojvodina) ===
2000 Vojvodina provincial election: Kanjiža Division 2
Candidate	Party	Votes	%
István Bacskulin (incumbent)	Alliance of Vojvodina Hungarians	4,884	60.30
Jenő Serfőző	Citizens' Group: Producers of Horgos	2,292	28.30
Aleksandar Milićević	Socialist Party of Serbia–Yugoslav Left	616	7.61
Jovan Radojčić	Serbian Radical Party	307	3.79
Total		8,099	100.00

1996 Vojvodina provincial election: Kanjiža Division 2
Candidate	Party	Votes	%
István Bacskulin (incumbent)	Alliance of Vojvodina Hungarians		59.79
Imre Majorosi	Democratic Fellowship of Vojvodina Hungarians		
István Sóti	Socialist Party of Serbia		
Total			
Source: Majorosi and Sóti are listed alphabetically.

December 1992 Vojvodina provincial election: Kanjiža Division 2
Candidate	Party	Votes	%
István Bacskulin	Democratic Fellowship of Vojvodina Hungarians		64.8
István Konc	Socialist Party of Serbia		
Sándor Saghmeister (incumbent)	Citizens' Group		
Total			
Source: Konc and Saghmeister are listed alphabetically.

=== Municipal (Kanjiža) ===
2004 Kanjiža local election: Mayor of Kanjiža
Candidate	Party	First round		Second round	
Candidate	Party	Votes	%	Votes	%
Károly Körmöci	Reformists of Vojvodina	4,523	42.30	5,646	62.19
István Bacskulin	Alliance of Vojvodina Hungarians	3,158	29.53	3,432	37.81
Bálint Csaba	Democratic Party	1,158	10.83		
Goran Nikolić	League of Social Democrats of Vojvodina	944	8.83		
Piroska Vadász Kávai	G17 Plus	910	8.51		
Total		10,693	100.00	9,078	100.00

2000 Kanjiža municipal election: Division 4 (Horgos)
Candidate	Party	Votes	%
Jenő Serfőző	Citizens' Group: Producers of Horgos	337	51.85
István Bacskulin (incumbent)	Alliance of Vojvodina Hungarians	313	48.15
Total		650	100.00

1996 Kanjiža municipal election: Division 4 (Horgos)
Candidate	Party	Votes	%
István Bacskulin (incumbent)	Alliance of Vojvodina Hungarians–Reform Democratic Party of Vojvodina (Affiliation: Alliance of Vojvodina Hungarians)		elected
Zoltán Balázs Piri	Citizens' Group		
Nándor Sárkány	Citizens' Group		
István Sóti	Citizens' Group		
Total			
Source: All candidates except Bacskulin are listed alphabetically.
