= Debelo Brdo, Bosnia and Herzegovina =

Debelo Brdo
- Village
- Location within Bosnia and Herzegovina
- Coordinates: 44.4609545°N 18.1265096°E
- Country: Bosnia and Herzegovina
- Entity: Federation of Bosnia and Herzegovina
- Canton: Zenica-Doboj
- Municipality: Žepče

Area
  - Total: 0.73 sq mi (1.89 km^{2})

Population (2013)
  - Total: 138
  - Density: 189/sq mi (73.0/km^{2})
- Time zone: UTC+1 (CET)
  - Summer (DST): UTC+2 (CEST)

Debelo Brdo is a village in the municipality of Žepče, Bosnia and Herzegovina.

== Demographics ==
According to the 2013 census, its population was 138.

Ethnicity in 2013
Ethnicity	Number	Percentage
Croats	132	95.7%
Bosniaks	6	4.3%
Total	138	100%
