= Scouting and Guiding in Kosovo =

Scouting exists in Kosovo both as part of the Savez Izviđača Srbije as well as independent groups.

A report on the current situation and possible perspectives was published by the European Scout Region . The report mentions at least five different organizations:

- Savez Izviđača Kosova i Metohije is the regional council of the Savez Izviđača Srbije, member of the World Organization of the Scout Movement
- the Qendra Nacionale e Vëzhguesve të Kosovës (National Scout Center of Kosovo), a provisional member of the World Federation of Independent Scouts (WFIS)
- Kosovo Scout Association
- Kosovo Scout Federation
- Kosova'da İzcilik Teşkilatlanması (Scouts of Kosovo), member of the World Organization of Independent Scouts (WOIS).
- Lidhja e Vëzhguesëve Rinia e Kosovës/Kosova Genç Izciler Birliği/Savez Izvidjača Omladine Kosova (LVRK, Youth Scouts League of Kosovo)

The Scout Motto is Буди Спреман (Budi Spreman) in Serbian, translating as "Be Prepared", and Ji Gati, "Be Prepared" in Albanian. The common Serbian term for all members, regardless of section, is "Izviđač" (meaning "Scout"). The Albanian noun for a single Scout is Skaut.
