= Debelo Brdo I =

- Village
- Interactive map of Debelo Brdo I
- Location within Croatia
- Coordinates: 44.54316°N 15.30566°E
- Country: Croatia
- County: Lika-Senj
- Municipality: Gospić

Area
  - Total: 1.14 sq mi (2.94 km^{2})

Population (2021)
  - Total: 56
  - Density: 49/sq mi (19/km^{2})
- Time zone: UTC+1 (CET)
  - Summer (DST): UTC+2 (CEST)

Debelo Brdo I is a village in the City of Gospić, Croatia. It is connected by the D25 road.

== See also ==
- Debelo Brdo II
