= Miloš Popović (Scouting) =

Serbian scouting pioneer (1876–1954)

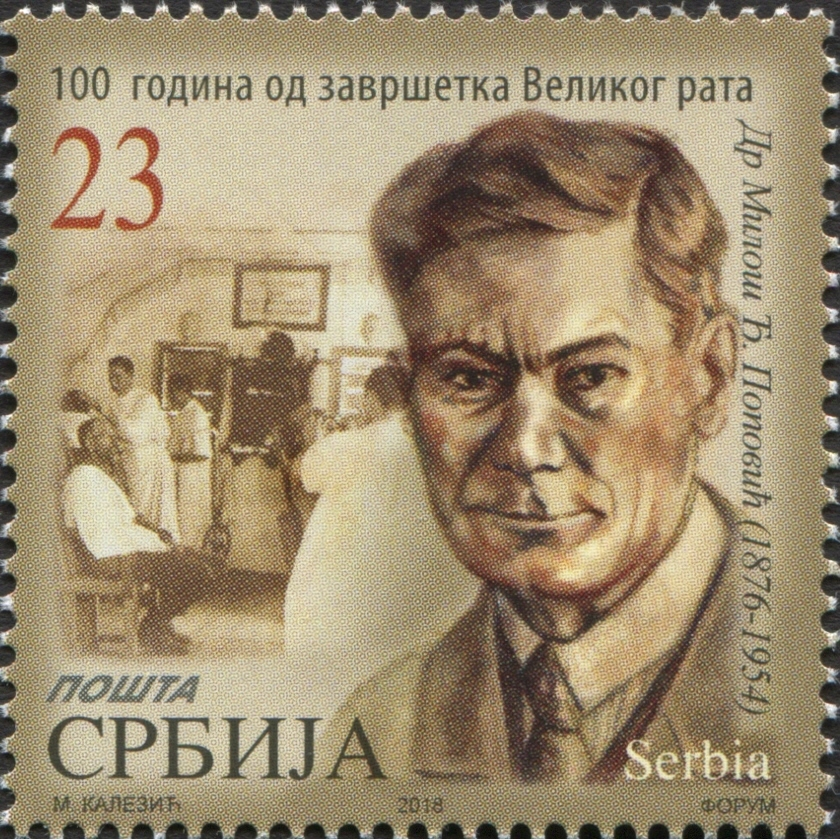
Popović on a 2018 stamp of Serbia

Dr. Miloš Đ. Popović (Serbian Cyrillic: Милош Поповић; 27 February 1876 – 7 September 1954) was a Scouting pioneer in Yugoslavia.

Popović was born in Čajetina and studied in Belgrade and in Vienna. 1901 he founded the Society for the fight against alcoholism called the League of Sober youth, and in 1911 the Alliance Scouts and Climbers. He was the first editor of the Allies, Chief of the Ministry of Social Affairs and head of the Clinical Hospital in Belgrade. After World War II he became the president of the Red Cross of Yugoslavia.

== League of sober youth ==
Too many people devoted to alcohol, health problems and high death rate, especially among children and youth, prompted Dr. Popović on the idea of a movement against the dangerous and bad habit - alcoholism. While studying in Vienna he met with Swiss Professor Dr. Auguste Forel, who impressed him with his "Movement to combat alcoholism".

Upon his return to Serbia in 1901, together with Dr. John Danica (first Serbian neuropsychiatrist), as the leader, and Dr M. Miljkovic he founded a movement called the League of sober youth. In the spring of 1912 the League of sober youth counted 80 cells with 8,000 members across the country. At the head of the list of the most prominent sober members was His Majesty King Peter I, the great philanthropist and lifelong personal abstinent. Great help was also provided by Dr. Auguste Forel. Soon the movement received support from the Good Templars. The league adopted their organization (establishing lodges) and the rules of abstinence (complete abstinence). Anyone who joined the movement had to commit themselves to never take, make or give alcohol to anyone else ever. With the help of Good Templars they were able to published a series of translated and original books and booklets in which they pointed to the deleterious effects of alcohol, and infectious diseases, especially tuberculosis.

Dr. Popović was one of the most prominent members of the temperance movement. In 1910 he founded and edited the journal "Saveznik" eng. Allies. Under his influence were composed or translated and performed several short theater pieces: Da sam znao ranije (If I knew earlier), Kobna Čaša (Fatal glass) and Mrtvaci a pijete (Dead but you still drink) amongst others.

Although the temperance movement was getting more and more momentum among the citizens, Dr. Popović was still not satisfied. He felt that a great and bad habit, such as alcoholism, could not just shrink and eventually disappear. The only solution was another, stronger habit that it supplanted. He believed that soberness was lacking a content.

== Scouting ==
In 1908 he received a book by a German Army doctor, which was a German translation of the book by Robert Baden Powell's Scouting for Boys. Dr. Popović started publishing its chapters. The word Scout was translated as četnik. His explanation of the translation was:

"We, in our history, did not have Scouts who moved around the rainforest and the vast unknown, but we had Uskoks, Hajduks and the Četniks who were defending the honor and property of its people."

Translation of Scouting became četnik movement; even members of the newly created organization were called small četniks. Upon the creation of the Kingdom of Serbs, Croats and Slovenes, to contribute to peace in the country, the word četniks was changed into izvidnik (Scout), which is maintained to this day.

He started the magazine Saveznik-Četnik (Ally - Chetniks). At that time, the sale of the magazines on the territory of neighboring Austro-Hungarian Empire was banned. He translated Dr Lyons book calling it Četniks but, nobody wanted to publish it in Serbia. Dr. Popović decided to do it at his own expense. After the release of the book, Serbian Literary Gazette (br .269) showered it with praise and called it the golden book for young people, while the Austro-Hungarian government declared it dangerous. During the occupation of Serbia during the First World War the book was sought after, confiscated and burned whenever an Austrian soldier found it. However, some books where still preserved. In 1925 the book was reprinted, but called Scout. In the foreword of the book it is written:

Dr. Popović traveled through Serbia and gathered youth in the schoolyards. In these speeches, he said this:

"The first and most important duty of our Scouts is to learn to be healthy, for ourselves, but also families, nations, states, and if you want the whole of humanity. Scouting is a school of health, survival and morality. Way of acquiring useful habits that displaces bad ones. Slavic nations lacks sufficiently developed sense of duty. Developing that sense is one of the most important tasks of Scouting. Responsibility for their own health and behavior."

Accepting the organization, rules, skills, clothing, insignia, by at that time the Scouts of the world, he introduced deeper educational objectives: faith in God, respect for the rulers, authorities and helping the weak, respect other people's property, doing good deeds, trust in senior (parents, older brother, other), trust in doctors.

During the Balkan Wars (1912 and 1913) hundreds of small četniks formed small corps of volunteers. They were assisted by jurisdictions and hospitals, just like once in South Africa during the Anglo - Boer War, acted boys in the besieged Mafeking. The First World War interrupted this. Lacking sufficient practical and technical experience, our pre-war Scouting, according to Dr. Popović can be considered as a precursor to the later ones. 1917 In Vodeni (now Edessa) in Greece, Dr. Popović renewed both the League of sober youth and Scouting.

== See also ==
- Savez Izviđača Srbije
