= International Boy Scouts, Troop 1 =

International Boy Scouts, Troop 1 (IBS)
- International Boy Scouts, Troop 1 (IBS)
- Japanese: 国際ボーイスカウト第一団
- Headquarters: Yokohama
- Country: Japan
- Founded: 1911 (1918)
- Affiliation: World Organization of the Scout Movement
- Website http://www.troop1.net

Beaver Scout	Cub Scout	Scout

International Boy Scouts, Troop 1, Japan's first Boy Scout troop, was founded in 1911, with Clarence Griffin as Scoutmaster. Despite its early multinational character the troop's original registration was with the London headquarters of The Boy Scouts Association as "British Scouts in Foreign Countries". This initial charter was due to there being no international Boy Scout office and the "nationality requirement" that was in effect at the time. In 1918, the troop's character changed considerably when the new Scoutmaster, Bro. Joseph Janning, received approval from Lord Baden-Powell to officially reorganized the troop as a mixed-nationality, or "international", troop. B-P subsequently brought the Troop's situation before the 3rd World Scout Conference where the newly formed Boy Scouts International Bureau (WOSM World Scout Bureau) received approval to directly register Troop 1 and, in the future, other such "international" groups. The troop was then directly registered by the Boy Scouts International Bureau and was issued the Boy Scout movement's first "mixed nationality" charter, dated October 30, 1925, signed by Baden-Powell as Chief Scout and Hubert S. Martin as Director of the new International Bureau. Within a few years the nationality requirement was abolished and, even though the Bureau maintained the direct registration of Troop 1 and other groups already registered, new groups were requested to join the national organization of the country in which they were located and no new groups were chartered. Over the years the directly chartered groups one-by-one and for varied reasons slowly disbanded and by 1955 only Troop 1 remained. The troop has been continuously active, including war years, since its first meeting held in Yokohama, Japan on October 16, 1911, and currently consists of coed sections of Beaver Scouts, Cub Scouts, Scouts, Senior Scouts, and Veteran Scouts.

== Background ==
In Japan, as early as 1908, Scouting came to the notice of a number of influential educators, some of whom adapted Scout ideas to their educational work. However, the first Boy Scout Troop to be established in Japan was begun in Yokohama by Clarence Griffin in 1911.

As an adult, Griffin was very active in the foreign community in Yokohama and decided to begin a Boy Scout troop in the fall of the 1911. The first meeting of the new troop was held in October of that year with 18 new Scouts: 12 English, 3 American, 2 Danish, and 1 Norwegian. On December 12, 1911, Clarence Griffin and the Scouts, mostly British and all students of Saint Joseph College, the primary and secondary school for foreign boys located on the "Bluff" in Yokohama, gathered at the Gaiety Theater on the Bluff to demonstrate Scouting skills and to officially celebrate the beginning of the troop. This is the troop that greeted Baden-Powell on his visit to Japan on April 2, 1912. B-P had not heard of any Scouting in Japan prior to his arrival and expressed surprise at being welcomed by a local Scout Troop.

Baden-Powell himself presented Griffin with a warrant as Scoutmaster and the troop was subsequently registered with the Boy Scouts Association in London as the "First Yokohama", a "British troop abroad", and by that registration its membership was restricted to youngsters of British nationality. It does not seem that this limitation was strictly adhered to, but the troop generally marched behind the Union Jack and the Scout flag, and was frequently referred to as the "British Troop."

This troop, the First Yokohama, dropped its British charter in September 1918 and under the leadership of Bro. Joseph Janning, SM as the Scoutmaster changed its name to the International Boy Scouts, Troop 1.

== History ==
=== Early years ===
The transition by the Scouts of the First Yokohama to the "international" troop began with Marianist Bro. Joseph Janning's arrival on assignment to St. Joseph College. Bro. Janning had become acquainted with Scouting in the United States; and shortly after his arrival in Yokohama in December 1917, he became convinced that it would be an ideal addition to the program for all boys of St. Joseph College, regardless of nationality and not primarily limited to the British students of the school. In 1918, Bro. Janning proposed an "international" troop, open to all nationalities, to Bro. Jean-Baptist Gaschy, director of the college, and to the school council. After hearing his explanation of the Scout movement and his idea of an "international" troop, the council enthusiastically accepted Bro. Janning's proposal. The first meeting of the new international group, consisting of the 36 boys of the 1st Yokohama and a few of their classmates, was held on September 16, 1918, on the grounds of the school. By the end of September there were over 70 Scouts and by the end of 1918 the troop had grown to more than 150 Scouts.

In 1920, Richard Shin Suzuki, the son of a Japanese father and British mother, and a patrol leader in the International Troop, was returning to England for study when he was met on board ship by Toyomatsu Shimoda and Hiroshi Koshiba. Shimoda and Koshiba were traveling on private business to England, but were also to attend the 1st World Scout Jamboree. When they met Richard and learned that he was a Scout, they asked him to join them in attending the Jamboree. Being the only Scout-age participant, Richard carried the Japanese placard in the "Procession of the Nations" during the opening ceremonies.

In January 1922, the troop was part of an honor guard welcoming Marshal Joseph Joffre to Japan. Later in 1922 they greeted Edward, Prince of Wales at the Port of Yokohama and took part in the Prince's dedication of a memorial arch to Allied soldiers fallen in World War I.

The Great Kantō earthquake of September 1, 1923, devastated Yokohama. Clarence Griffin was found barely breathing by shocked Scouts as they helped with rescue work in the aftermath of the destruction. Relocating to Kobe he recovered from his injuries; however, being financially ruined by the quake, he soon left Japan. At the same time, both St. Joseph College and the troop was temporarily relocated to Kobe where Scouting activities were continued without interruption under the leadership of Bro. Janning. The college and the troop waited while Yokohama was being rebuilt after the devastation. The school, and with it, the Scout Troop returned to Yokohama in 1925.

At the 3rd World Scout Conference in 1924, prompted by an earlier letter from Bro. Janning to B-P, the issue of the "International" troop was raised and the newly formed Boy Scouts International Bureau was authorized to directly register mixed nationality Scout groups. The IBS, Troop 1 Charter, dated October 30, 1925, was the first Charter issued by the International Bureau under the new authorization. Lord Baden-Powell and Hubert S. Martin, the first Director of the newly formed Boy Scouts International Bureau, signed the Charter. In 1929, Bro. Janning left Yokohama for the United States, and the troop leadership passed to Bro. William V. (Abromitis) Ambrose.

With the gradual strengthening of the military and a more nationalistic sentiment in general, Scouting, and especially foreign Scouts, were increasingly viewed with suspicion by the Japanese authorities. The Troop was often followed by Japanese military police while on outings and the leaders decided it was inadvisable to openly wear uniforms or display flags or insignia. Outdoor hikes and camps continued but became limited in number. This situation caused a sharp decline in the enthusiasm for Scouting, and numbers in the troop declined. Bro. Francis Tribull, a new arrival in Yokohama, joined the Troop in 1937 as both Cubmaster and Assistant Scoutmaster and the leaders decided to risk the re-establishment of the full Scout program, including a Drum and Bugle Corps. New flags were made and uniforms purchased. The renewed look rejuvenated the Troop. It grew to such an extent that it became necessary to establish "junior" and "senior" divisions. The group formed by the older Scouts, students from the high school section of the school, would eventually be called the IBS Senior Scout Unit 1. In 1939, Bro. Ambrose was named the director of St. Joseph College and, as such, Director of the IBS Committee, while Bro. Gerald Gutsmiedl took over the role as Scoutmaster. Bro. Tribull transferred to Kobe, and his place in Scouting at was taken by Bro. Brandmaier. Alfred X. Agajan, himself a Scout in the troop as a boy, became Assistant Scoutmaster.

=== World War II and aftermath ===
Such was the political situation that, on January 1, 1941, resulted in the Japanese Department of Education calling for the abolition of all Japanese youth organizations. On January 16, 1941, the Boy Scouts of Japan, which had been formed in 1922, ceased to exist. The international troop was not bound to discontinue its activities, but on December 8, 1941, Troop 1 Scoutmaster, Bro. Gutsmiedl, along with Assistant Scoutmaster Brandmaier and former Scoutmaster Ambrose, were the first arrested as enemy aliens and interned at the Negishi Internment Camp. On the same day, Bro. Tribull was also arrested in Kobe. This left Alfred Agajan alone with responsibility for the troop. In 1942, Bro. Leo Kraft joined Alfred Agajan in leading the troop. With the large number of foreign residents either voluntarily or forcibly leaving Yokohama, both the school and the troop, although continuing, suffered a loss of membership and many restrictions through World War II. With reduced numbers and the loss of jobs, funding was tight and, due to the war, outdoor activities were limited. In September 1943, the school was ordered to vacate its Yokohama buildings and was moved to very inadequate quarters in the Hakone mountains at Gora. The long abandoned property, next to a park near the station, consisted of old wooden buildings that had once served as a small hotel. The school was able to continue holding classes for a small number of students in all grades from 1 through 12. Bro. Kraft, Scoutmaster, went with the troop and school to Gora and Alfred Agajan was interned in Karuizawa.

Indoor Scouting activities were continued by Bro. Kraft, practicing knot tying, first aid, and other Scouting skills while sitting on the stairways of the temporary school building. In 1945, when the war ended, Bro. Haegeli, Director of the school, negotiated the return of the school's property in Yokohama, and St. Joseph College was able to return to its pre-war campus in time to prepare for the start of the new school year. Alfred Agajan relocated to the United States and did not return to the troop. Bro. Francis Tribull, who had been an Assistant Scoutmaster before the war, was appointed Scoutmaster on his return to St. Joseph College, with Bro. Leo Kraft remaining as an Assistant Scoutmaster. The Troop joined with Japanese and American Scouts on September 24–25, 1949 in Tokyo for the first postwar All-Japan camp held by the Boy Scouts of Japan to celebrate the reorganization of the Japanese Scout association. The camporee was organized with the cooperation of the American occupation forces, who had formed their own Scout troops. It was held at Doolittle Field, now called Hibiya Koen, in Tokyo. The Boy Scouts of Japan were readmitted as a full member of the WOSM on June 30, 1950. In July the IBS joined the Kanagawa Scouts for a camporee to celebrate the Japanese Scout association's readmission to the world Scout organization. John Mittwer, a founding member of the IBS as a boy, and an active IBS Scouter, was also serving on both the Board of the Kanagawa Council of the Boy Scouts of Japan and as a District Commissioner for the Boy Scouts of America's Far East Council. Helping to revive postwar Scouting, he was a key organizer of the event that again brought groups from the IBS, the BSJ, and the BSA Far East Council together for an "international" camp held in Yokohama at Sankeien, the private garden of Mr. Hara. Soon after the Kanagawa Camp the IBS Scouts participated in the second All-Japan Camporee held from August 18–20, 1950 in Tokyo at Shinjuku Gyoen. The third All-Japan Camporee was held from August 4–6, 1951 and again the IBS and BSA joined the Japanese Scouts for the Camporee. In 1953, John Mittwer was awarded a Certificate of Appreciation by the National Office of the Boy Scouts of Japan. The IBS participated in the first Nippon Jamboree (fourth All-Japan Camporee) held at Karuizawa in 1956. Beginning with this Camporee, the name of this national gathering of Scouts was changed to "Nippon Jamboree" and the BSJ announced that the event would be held regularly on a four-year basis, between the World Scout Jamborees.

In the years since 1925 the World Scout Bureau had directly registered a number of "mixed nationality groups" throughout the world. The number of these groups, however, gradually decreased as troops disbanded for various reasons. Until 1955 there was also a directly registered "mixed nationality" Scout troop at the RAF Union School in Habbaniya, Iraq. The Troop was associated with the Union School which had a student body consisting primarily of Assyrian students, with an Armenian minority and a few Indian students. The school was under the authority of RAF Habbaniya and when RAF Habbaniya was turned over to the Iraqi government in 1955 the Troop was forced to disband. The Boy Scouts International Bureau (BSIB) had also dropped the "nationality" requirement and had stopped direct registration, instead referring new groups to a national organization such as the Scout Association or the Boy Scouts of America. This development left Troop 1 of Yokohama as the only remaining active troop of the original groups directly registered by the World Scout Bureau.

=== Modern period ===
IBS Emblems 1918, 1952, 1955 showing evolution of the IBS Emblem

Prior to 1951 the IBS used an emblem of a simple fleur-de-lis with the letters I, B, and S at the points. In 1952 the emblem was redesigned with a globe at the center, originally showing the continents similar to the Boy Scouts of the United Nations emblem. After review of the new post-war constitution, badges, and program by the World Scout Bureau the globe was simplified to include only grid lines to create a more distinctive emblem. This emblem, shown on the IBS Scouter Badge, is still used by the IBS. The revised IBS Constitution went into effect after review and correction by the World Scout Bureau in 1956 and the first Scouts were awarded "Globe Scout", IBS's highest rank under the new constitution. Between 1956 and 1958, the IBS Committee and Leaders, under direction from the World Scout Bureau and with the cooperation of the Senior Scouts, prepared a new Scout Handbook, which includes the IBS Constitution, designs of the Scout uniforms, Troop 1's distinctive Scout badges and program. The IBS Scout Handbook was first published in book form in 1961; but the newly designed uniforms and badges were worn by the IBS contingent to the 1959 Nippon Jamboree.

The 3rd and 4th Nippon Jamborees were held in 1962 and 1966 respectively, and the IBS continued its participation at the Jamborees with both Scouts and Scouters attending the events. In 1963, IBS Scouter Bro. Germain Vonderscher participated as a staff member at the 11th World Scout Jamboree in Greece, serving as a translator for visiting contingents. In 1966, IBS Scouter John Mittwer was awarded the Silver Cuckoo Distinguished Service Award by the Boy Scouts of Japan. Mittwer's work had taken him to Incheon, Korea where he was instrumental in helping revive post-war Scouting in the area. Following awards of Certificates of Commendation by the Korea Scout Association in 1962, 1963 and 1965 he was awarded the first of the Korea Scout Association's distinguished service awards, also called the Silver Cuckoo, in 1966. Mittwer participated as a staff member at the 12th World Scout Jamboree in 1967 in Idaho, U.S.A. and, at the conclusion of the Jamboree and in connection with the 21st World Scout Conference held in Seattle, Washington, he was presented a Scout Friendship Certificate by the WOSM in recognition of his contribution to international Scouting. He initiated an exchange program between the Incheon District of the Korea Scout Association and the Kanagawa Council of the Boy Scouts of Japan and, in 1970, was made an Honorary Citizen of Incheon in recognition of his contribution to Scouting in that area.

On the occasion of the Golden Jubilee Celebration of the "International" Troop in 1968, the Chief Scout of the Boy Scouts of Japan, Dr. Hidesaburo Kurushima, presented a Medal of Appreciation to IBS founder Bro. Joseph Janning for his role in Scouting. In connection with the 50th anniversary, the IBS also received greetings and a blessing from Pope Paul VI in the form of the Apostolic Benediction.

13th WSJ Jamboree Brochure produced by BSN with BSN & IBS Scouts

The 13th World Scout Jamboree was scheduled to be hosted by the Boy Scouts of Japan in 1971 and preparations for the event were well under way by 1970. The IBS cooperated with the Japanese Scout association in the production of pre-Jamboree promotional items, including brochures, postcards and posters. The items featured IBS Scouts wearing the Scout uniforms of various countries to help promote the "international" image of the event under the theme "For Understanding". That 13th World Scout Jamboree was set to be held near Gotemba, Shizuoka Prefecture at Asagiri Kogen and, in preparation for that world event, the 5th Nippon Jamboree was held at this location in August 1970. A large contingent of IBS Scouts and Scouters participated in both Jamborees at Asagiri, as well as the subsequent 6th Nippon Jamboree of 1974 and the 7th Nippon Jamboree held in 1978. At the 6th Nippon Jamboree John Mittwer served as the overall head of the Jamboree's Postal Service Division. Being conveniently located in Japan, the IBS able to send a large contingent to the 1971 World Scout Jamboree under the leadership of Scoutmaster Joseph Schieble, Senior Scout Advisor James Masur and IBS Committee member John Mittwer. At the conclusion of the Jamboree Bro. James Masur, who had joined the IBS as a Scouter in 1952 and was a driving force behind the revised constitution and new look of the IBS, was awarded a Certificate of Appreciation by the Boy Scouts of Japan. From Dec 28, 1973 through Jan 4, 1974, IBS Scouts under the leadership of Scoutmaster James Masur traveled to the Philippines to participate in the 1st Asia-Pacific Jamboree. This Jamboree also celebrated the Golden Jubilee of the Boy Scouts of the Philippines. In 1976 John Mittwer who, in 1972, had been awarded the Silver Hawk by the Korea Scout Association, was awarded the Japanese Scout association's second highest Distinguished Service Medal, also called the Silver Hawk. In 1977, in recognition of his outstanding service to Scouting he was decorated with the Order of the Sacred Treasure, Fifth Class by the Japanese Government.

Bro. Joseph Scheible transferred to St. Joseph College on assignment in 1958 and, having experience as a Scouter in the United States, was soon signed on as Cubmaster of the Troop. Over the next 35 years he took responsibility for leadership positions in nearly every division of the IBS, serving as Scoutmaster for over 20 years. During the decades of the 1980s and 1990s the IBS continued its unbroken record of participation in the Nippon Jamborees. Between 1982 and 1998 IBS Scouts and Scouters participated in the 8th through the 12th Nippon Jamborees. This period also saw the participation of IBS Scouts at three World Scout Jamborees. In 1983 an IBS contingent under Scoutmaster Edward Bracha traveled to Calgary for the 15th World Scout Jamboree. The Troop's representation at the 15th WSJ in Australia, which was held over the 1987-88 New Year period was, due to the timing and distance, limited to a few Scouts who joined host Troops for the Jamboree. The 1991 Jamboree, however, provided a better opportunity for the IBS contingent and under the leadership of Scoutmaster Joseph Scheible a larger group of IBS Scouts were able to participate in the 17th World Scout Jamboree held in Korea. In 1995 it was announced that the Marianists planned to close St. Joseph College, now called St. Joseph International School, and in 1997 Bro. Joseph Scheible transferred back to the United States. Upon arriving at his new assignment he soon assumed the duties of Scoutmaster for a local Troop and continued in Scouting until his retirement in 2010, having been a Scouter for over 50 years.

In May 2000 St. Joseph International School held commencement exercises for the final graduating class of the school. The school had been the home of the international Troop since 1918. Under direction of the IBS Committee, the IBS started the new decade by relocating to nearby facilities on the Bluff and in 2002 IBS Scouts and Scouters again marched in the opening ceremonies of the Nippon Jamboree. Through the decade, the IBS continued its unbroken participation in the Nippon Jamborees, taking part in the 13th through the 16th events which were held in 2002, 2006, 2010 and 2013. In 2003 the IBS established an Amateur radio station, JQ1YRX, at the new IBS Headquarters and participated for the first time in the Jamboree on the Air (JOTA) from their own station. The IBS was also represented at the World Scout Jamborees held in 2007 and 2011. IBS Scouter Utz Reiff, himself a Globe Scout, Scouter, and IBS Executive Committee member, represented the IBS and participated on the staff at the 21st "Centennial" World Scout Jamboree of 2007. The 90th anniversary of the "international" Troop was celebrated in 2008 and in connection with the celebrations the IBS amateur radio station aired the commemorative callsign 8J1IBS, including an activation of the HF station by IBS Scouts from the summit of Mount Fuji in August 2008. In 2010 the APEC conference was held in Yokohama and from September 28 through October 3 the IBS participated, together with the Japanese Girl and Boy Scout associations, in exhibitions at the Yokohama Red Brick Warehouse to commemorate the opening of the conference.

October 2011 marked the 100th Anniversary of the "British Troop", the "1st Yokohama", and April 2012 was the 100th Anniversary of B-P's visit to Japan and his surprise greeting by Scoutmaster Griffin and the Scouts from St. Joseph College that formed that original Troop.

IBS Scouts and Scouters participated in the 23rd World Scout Jamboree hosted in 2015 by the Scout Association of Japan.

== Program sections ==
The IBS program sections are:

- Beaver Scouts, age 5 to 7
- Cub Scouts, age 8 to 10
- Boy Scouts, age 11 to 14
- Senior Scouts, age 14 to 20
- Veteran Scouts, age 18 up

The first IBS Beaver Colony began as a boys only group in 2002. In 2008 IBS began a gradual transition to a coed program and both boys and girls were allowed as members of the Beaver section. The membership of remaining sections successively converted to coed membership between 2010 and 2014 with all sections currently being coed.

There is some flexibility in age ranges based on the grade the Scout is in school.

== Nationalities of IBS Scouts and Scouters ==
Since being chartered directly by the World Scout Bureau as a "mixed nationality", or "international", group the Scout members of the IBS have come from over 40 countries. The IBS lists Scouts of 43 nationalities, including those Scouts that were registered as Stateless due to their political status, as having been IBS Scouts over the years. Scouts of 10 nationalities have earned Globe Scout, the highest rank of the IBS, since it was established in 1957.

The "international" nature of the IBS is not limited to the varied nationalities of the Scouts. The Scouters of IBS, with varied cultural backgrounds and Scouting experience brought from various countries around the world, also contributed to the uniqueness of the IBS. Although a comprehensive list of all adult leaders from over the years is not published by the IBS, Scouters that were Warranted directly by the World Scout Bureau as a Scoutmaster, Cubmaster, Senior Scout Advisor, or their main assistant, brought their Scouting experience and culture from 15 different countries.

== Amateur radio station ==
The IBS operates a ham radio station, under the callsign JQ1YRX. In 2007 the IBS was authorized by the Japanese Ministry of Posts and Telecommunications to use the commemorative callsign 8J1IBS to mark the 90th anniversary of the founding of the "international" troop. The IBS aired the 8J1IBS callsign from October 2007 through December 31, 2008 and participated in both the 50th and 51st JOTA events as 8J1IBS. When issued 8J1IBS was, at 440 days, the fourth-longest license term of a Special Event Station ever issued by the Japanese Ministry of Posts and Telecommunications.

== Scout Oath, Law, and Motto ==
All sections of IBS currently follow the same Scout Oath (Promise), Law, and Motto. The Cub Scout Promise, Law, and Motto were retired in 2014.

Scout Oath (Promise)

On my honor I will to do my best:
To do my duty to God and my country,
to obey the Scout Law and to respect
the civil authority of the country in which I live;
To help other people at all times;
To keep myself physically strong, mentally awake, and morally straight.

Scout Law

A Scout IS:
Trustworthy, Loyal, Helpful, Friendly, Courteous, Kind, Obedient, Cheerful, Thrifty, Brave, Clean, and Reverent.

Scout Motto

Be Prepared

=== Retired Cub Scout Promise, Law, and Motto ===
Promise (retired in 2014)

I, __________, promise
To do my best
To do my duty
To God and my country,
To obey the Law of the Pack,
And to do a good turn
EVERY DAY.

Law of the IBS Cub Pack (retired in 2014)

The Cub Scout uses two EARS to HEAR and learn.
The Cub Scout uses two EYES to SEE which way to turn.
The Cub Scout's LEGS can walk the extra mile.
The Cub Scout's FACE will always show a SMILE.

Cub Scout Motto (retired in 2014)

DO YOUR BEST

== Emblem and uniform ==
IBS Emblem

The IBS emblem incorporates a globe representing the international nature of the group. The current emblem was designed in the early 1950s and the design was finalized with the review and approval of the revised Constitution, Policy and Rules of the IBS by the World Scout Bureau in 1957.

Uniforms

The IBS Scout uniform consists of a light blue shirt and light blue cap for Beaver Scouts; a blue shirt, pants, and blue cap with yellow piping for Cub Scouts; khaki shirt and navy pants, and a khaki overseas cap with blue piping for Boy Scouts; and a gray shirt and navy pants, and navy blue beret for Senior Scouts. Since 2012 all sections wear the IBS neckerchief; navy blue with a white broken border and I.B.S. design in the corner. Senior Scouts may wear a maroon tie on formal occasions. The Scouters Uniform consists of a navy blue beret, green necktie or IBS neckerchief, and shirt, trousers, belt as for the Boy Scouts but without Badges of Rank or Merit Badges.

== Advancement ==
IBS Boy Scout rank badges

(l-r): Tenderfoot, Second Class, First Class, Forward, Unity, Globe

Scout Advancement

- Tenderfoot
- Second Class
- First Class
- Forward
- Unity
- Globe

Globe is the highest rank attainable in the Scouting (Boy Scout and Senior Scout) program of the International Boy Scouts, Troop 1 (IBS). A Scout who attains this rank is called a Globe Scout. The title of Globe Scout is held for life.

Cub Scout Advancement

IBS Cub Scout Advancement Badges

(l-r): Wolf Cub, Bear Cub, Lion Cub

- Bobcat

All new candidate Cub Scouts first earn Bobcat to complete the Cub Scout joining requirements. After completing Bobcat the Cub Scout may wear the uniform and neckerchief of the IBS and begins progress in their age appropriate program.

- Wolf, Bear, and Lion

Wolf Cubs are usually 8 years old, Bear Cubs 9 years old, and Lion Cubs 10 years old. Each section has 10 Achievements that are completed to earn the section's rank badge. After completing the Achievements the Cub Scouts begin working on the section's Electives.

Gold Star Award

- Gold Star Award

The Gold Star is the highest award in the Cub Scout section of the IBS. The Cub Scout is required to successfully complete the Lion rank and be at least 10 and a half years old before challenging the Gold Star. The Gold Star is the only Cub Scout award that can be worn on the Boy Scout uniform. The award is worn on the bottom of the left pocket for on the Cub Scout uniform and below the pocket on the Boy Scout uniform. Adults may wear the adult ribbon version of the Gold Star award above the left pocket.

== Scout Religious Award ==
IBS's Faith and Fortitude Award

Faith and Fortitude Award

When asked where religion came into Scouting, Baden-Powell replied "It does not come in at all. It is already there. It is a fundamental factor underlying Scouting and Guiding".

As an encouragement to the practice of their religion, Scouts of the IBS Troop may earn the special Faith and Fortitude award, signifying their faithfulness to the Scout's Duty to God. The award is available to Scouts of Second Class or higher rank.

The award is made without distinction as to religious affiliation; however, it may not be granted to any Scout whose life does not show evidence of a sincere practice of his faith, regardless of the external fulfillment of the requirements.

The Faith and Fortitude award consists of a simple ring of silver color suspended from a blue and white ribbon. The bar from which the ribbon depends bears the words "FAITH AND FORTITUDE".

== See also ==
- List of highest awards in Scouting
- Oldest Scout Groups
- Scout Association of Japan
