= August S. Narumi =

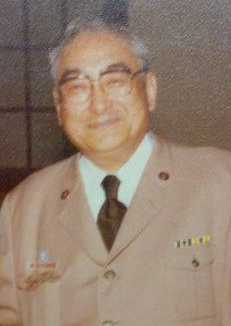
- Born: August Shigekazu Narumi; August 15, 1919; Los Angeles, California
- Died: February 5, 1994 (aged 74); Tokyo
- Other names: Narumi Shigekazu
- Known for: Member of the National Executive Council, as well as the National Board of Trustees of the Boy Scouts of Japan

August Shigekazu Narumi (鳴海重和, Narumi Shigekazu) (August 15, 1919, in Los Angeles, California – February 5, 1994, in Tokyo) served as a member of the National Executive Council, as well as the National Board of Trustees of the Boy Scouts of Japan.

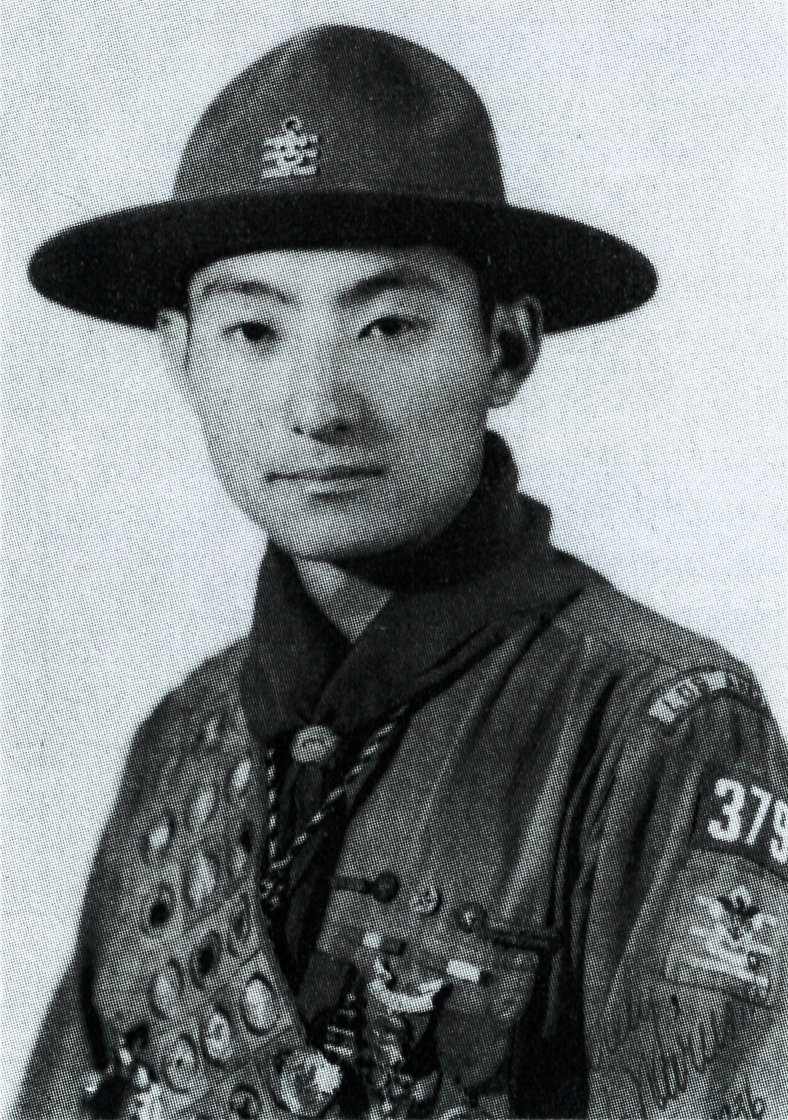

Narumi was awarded the Eagle Scout in September 1933, the first one for Boy Scouts of America Troop 379 in Los Angeles, and was also a lifetime member of the National Eagle Scout Association. He was among a group including Michiharu Mishima who went to Supreme Commander for the Allied Powers (GHQ) after World War II to get permission to restart the Scouting program in Japan.

He was awarded with the Distinguished Eagle Scout Award by the National Council of the Boy Scouts of America at an annual meeting in New York City May 20, 1976. In 1984, Narumi was awarded the 172nd Bronze Wolf, the only distinction of the World Organization of the Scout Movement, awarded by the World Scout Committee for exceptional services to world Scouting.

He was also awarded the Medal with Blue Ribbon (藍綬褒章, ranjuhōshō) and the Order of Culture (文化勲章, bunka-kunshō) from the Showa Emperor.
