= Satoru Nakamura (Scouting) =

- Born: February 21, 1893.
- Died: March 1, 1972 (aged 79)
- Occupations: Educator and scouting leader
- Known for: Active during the expansion period of Scouting in Japan, both before World War II and the postwar rebuilding period

Satoru Nakamura (中村 知, Nakamura Satoru; February 21, 1893 - March 1, 1972), Scout name "Chi-yan", (ちーやん meaning?), pen name Higashino Michiyoshi (東野通義), was a Japanese educator and Scouting leader active during the expansion period of Scouting in Japan, both before World War II and the postwar rebuilding period.

Nakamura is known for 『ちーやん夜話集』Chi-yan yawa-shū "Chi-yan Night Story Collection", lyric composition of many Scout songs, and translation of books which form the foundation of Scoutcraft.

In 1909, while studying at a high school affiliated with Hiroshima High Normal School (now Hiroshima University), he gained knowledge of British Scouting from the then principal Hōjō Tokiyuki, who gathered 30 students into the "Jōtō Group", in which he advanced to group leader.

In 1923, he became a teacher of the Osaka Prefectural Takatsu Junior High School (now Takatsu High School) History Department, established a Scout group as part of club activities, and served as Scoutmaster until 1939. In 1929, Nakamura attended the 3rd World Scout Jamboree, and completed the international leaders training course at Gilwell Park.

In 1939 he took office as Director of the Board of the Boy Scouts of Japan, in charge of training Boy Scout leaders. In 1950, the Camp Nasu campsite of the Boy Scouts of Japan was established, and Nakamura became the camp chief.

In 1966, he received the Order of the Sacred Treasure 5th class, Gold and Silver Rays.
