= Satoru Nakamura =

Satoru Nakamura may refer to:

- Satoru Nakamura (Scouting) (1893–1972), Japanese educator and Scouting leader
- Nakamura Satoru (general) (1854–1925), Imperial Japanese Army general
- Satoru Nakamura (Japanese journalist)(1964-), Japanese journalists dealing with Okinawa issues
