= Toyomatsu =

Toyomatsu (written: 豊松) may refer to:

- Toyomatsu, Hiroshima, a former village in Jinseki District, Hiroshima, Japan
- Shimoda Toyomatsu (下田 豊松, 1887–1972), Japanese writer and Scouting pioneer
