= Okushima =

Okushima may refer to:

- Takayasu Okushima
- Uninhabited Planet Survive!#Main
