= Koshiba =

- Pronunciation: Koshiba

Origin
- Origin: Japan
- Meaning: varies
- Region of origin: Japan

Koshiba (小柴) is a Japanese surname.

== People ==
- Fuka Koshiba (born 1997), Japanese actress
- Hiroshi Koshiba (1884–1925), one of the founders of the Japanese Scouting movement
- Joshua Koshiba (born 1943), politician
- Kenji Koshiba, wrestler
- Masatoshi Koshiba (1926–2020), physicist
- Peoria Koshiba (born 1979), sprinter
- Shigeru Koshiba, manga artist
- Tetsuya Koshiba, Japanese illustrator who helped work on the manga called Remote from 2002

== Fictional characters ==
- Kiri Koshiba a fictional character who's also a hairstylist, and the main protagonist from the manga, Beauty Pop.
- Azami Koshiba, a Java sparrow and supporting character from the bird-themed video game/interactive novel, Hatoful Boyfriend for Microsoft Windows PC.
