= Hidesaburō Kurushima =

Japanese engineer, author, and President of the Boy Scouts of Japan

- 久留島 秀三郎

Chief Scout of the Scout Association of Japan
- In office 1966–1970
- Preceded by: Mishima Michiharu
- Succeeded by: Saburō Matsukata

Personal details
- Born: Hidesaburō Nakano (中野 秀三郎); September 11, 1888 Kyoto, Japan
- Died: September 22, 1970 (aged 82) Tokyo, Japan
- Cause of death: Pneumonia
- Citizenship: Japan

Hidesaburō Kurushima (久留島 秀三郎, Kurushima Hidesaburō; September 11, 1888 – September 22, 1970) was President (from 1954), then International Commissioner, and Chairman of the National Board of the Boy Scouts of Japan. An engineer, he had a successful career in mining engineering. He was also an accomplished author, published several books on Indochina and Manchuria, and short stories in addition to scientific publications related to his work.

He was the discoverer of Hakore hot springs.

== Biography ==
In 1888 (Meiji 21), Hidesaburō was born as the second son of Chūhachi Nakano VI and Mine Nakano, who had run a pharmacy in Kyoto for generations. Chūhachi VI died in 1904, and then his elder brother, Chūzaburō, inherited the family business and their father's name to became Chūhachi Nakano VII.

Hidesaburō entered the Second Middle School of Kyoto, but he failed to finish the course in prescribed five years. Then he transferred to the Nihon Middle School in Tokyo. After leaving the middle school, he enrolled in the Third Higher School in Kyoto. Since he was so engrossed in rowing there, he decided to progress to the department of mining engineering in Kyushu Imperial University, which was newly established and admitted students without an examination.

In 1914 (Taisho 3), just after graduating from the university in July, he found a job in the South Manchuria Railway and soon served 18 months of military service as an engineering lieutenant. In September 1916, he returned to Japan and entered to the Ministry of Agriculture and Commerce. He got the job at Sapporo mine superintendence bureau. At the same time, Chūhachi VII and Kurushima Takehiko, who were working together in Boy Scout activities, had a plan of marrying eldest daughter Fukuko of Takehiko with Hidesaburō to let him inherit Kurushima family. They held a wedding ceremony at Tokyo Daijingu in April 1918, and Hidesaburō took the surname Kurushima.

On June 14, 1920, the explosion occurred at Yūbari coal mine and more than 200 miners were trapped inside the mine. Ten or more hours after the first explosion, Hidesaburō ordered the flooding of mine to extinguish the fire, assuming there were no survives. He took responsibility and resigned from the Ministry.

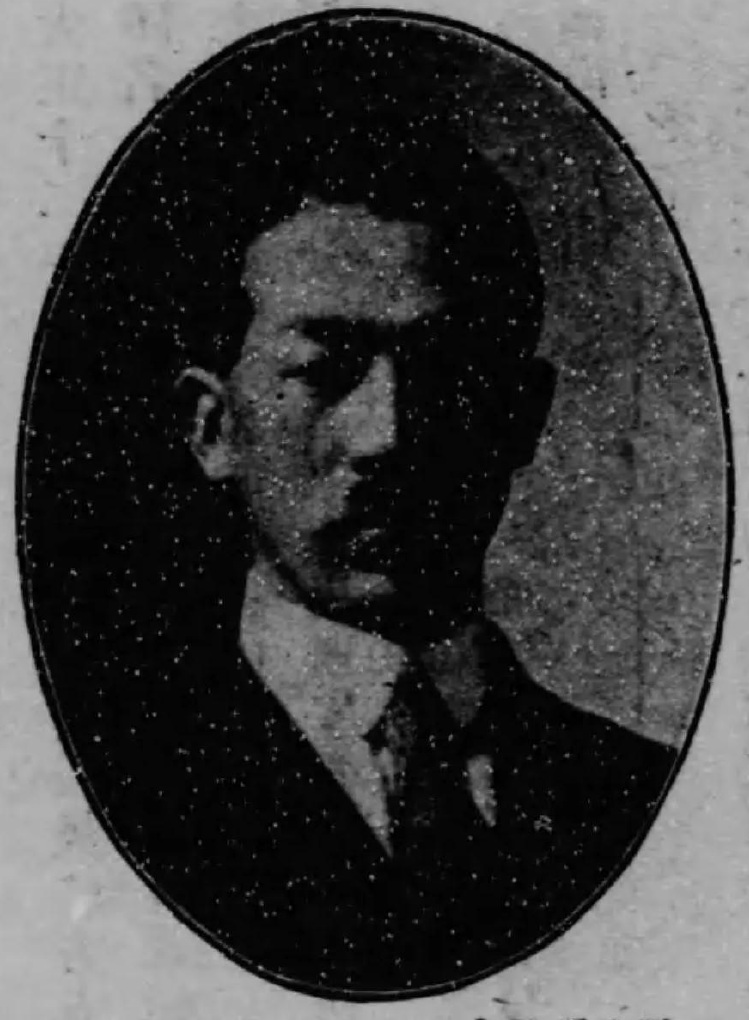
Hidesaburō Kurushima, 1920s

Immediately thereafter, he went to Manchuria again to work at Anshan Iron & Steel Works. On October 24, 1929 (Showa 4), while he had studied surface mining with Oxyliquit at Dagushan Iron Mine near Anshan, he was involved in the huge explosion accident which resulted in 36 victims. Fortunately, he got off with minor injuries.

In 1932, an organizer of coolies in the steel mill, 呉國壁; Wú Guóbì, was rumored to have become head of mounted bandits in Yantai. Kurushima visited there on March 17 trying to change his mind and letting him back to the mill, but Kurushima was restrained by Wú's group. A company of Imperial Army prepared to rescue Kurushima, while he persuaded Wú to release him from restraint. He wrote in his memoirs that he had been released from physical restraint by that time, and that the persuasion was with peaceful atmosphere. Finally, he went back to Anshan on March 21. Next April, Wú was killed by a gun being fired accidentally.

In 1933, he was assigned as the managing director and acting president. In 1939, he clashed with the headquarter of the South Manchuria Railway on the production plan, and he abandoned all his work at Manchuria and went back to Japan. In 1940, Hidesaburō was appointed to the board member of Showa Mining Co. Ltd., which later promoted him to the president in 1944. After the end of WWII, in 1946, he was invited to become the president of Dowa Mining Co. Ltd., and he held the position until 1963. In 1956, he submitted a dissertation on mining to Tohoku University, and took a Doctor of Engineering.

On September 22, 1970, he died from Pneumonia at St. Luke's International Hospital in Tokyo. Five days later, his funeral was held at Tsukiji Hongan-ji as the official ceremony of the Scout Association of Japan. He was posthumously awarded the Order of the Sacred Treasure.

== Scout activities ==
As noted above, his elder brother and father-in-law were enthusiastic Boy Scout advocates.

Hidesaburō himself became a Scout leader in 1916 and participated in the 2nd World Scout Jamboree in Denmark in 1924. He also participated in the organization of the 5th Nippon Jamboree in 1970 in Asagiri Plateau, Shizuoka Prefecture.

Kurushima related an anecdote about two soldiers during the Pacific War to visiting American Scouts in Japan. After a terrible battle, an American Marine was wounded in the jungle. He saw a Japanese soldier approaching with his bayonet, but he was so weak that he collapsed and lost consciousness, certain to be killed. When he awoke, he was surprised to find his wounds bandaged and a little note written in Japanese near him. The marine was rescued and transported to a field hospital, where he showed the paper to the doctor and asked him to translate. The note said that the Japanese soldier had approached the marine to kill him, but when the marine fell, he did the Scout salute, and as the Japanese soldier had also been a Scout, they were brother Scouts. The Japanese soldier could not kill the marine, instead he bandaged the marine's wounds, finally wishing him good luck and goodbye.

In 1967, Kurushima was awarded the 43rd Bronze Wolf, the only distinction of the World Organization of the Scout Movement, awarded by the World Scout Committee for exceptional services to world Scouting, at the 21st World Scout Conference. In 1959, he also received the highest distinction of the Scout Association of Japan, the Golden Pheasant Award.

== Other contributions ==
Since he was resigned from works in Manchuria before the Pacific war, he was exempt from the purge after WWII. As a result, he was given many public positions, including a chairman of the Japan Mining Industry Association, a chairman of the Union of Japanese Scientists and Engineers, and a board member of the Japanese National Railways.

In 1953, he worked at Yugoslavia as mining instructor of the United Nations. He had visited the country twelve times. In 1968, on the last trip to Yugoslavia in his life, Josip Broz Tito invited him to Brijuni.

Scouting
Preceded by Mishima Michiharu	Chief Scout of the Scout Association of Japan; 1966–1970	Succeeded by Saburō Matsukata
