= RIGS =

RIGS may refer to:

- Regionally Important Geological Site
- Ryukyu Islands Girl Scouts
- RIGS: Mechanized Combat League
