= Saburō Matsukata =

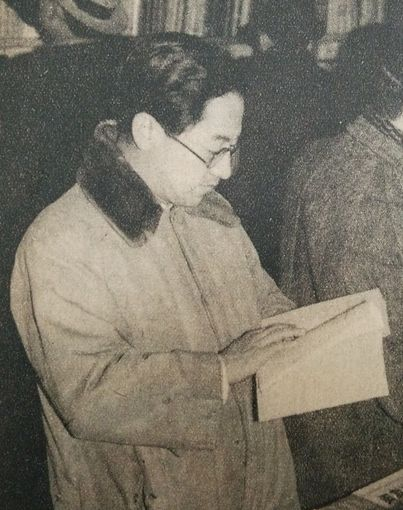
- 1948
- Born: August 1, 1899.
- Died: September 15, 1973 (aged 74)
- Occupations: Journalist, businessman and mountaineer
- Known for: Chief Scout of the Scout Association of Japan

Saburō Matsukata (松方 三郎, Matsukata Saburō; August 1, 1899 – September 15, 1973) of Japan, a journalist, businessman and mountaineer, served on the World Scout Committee of the World Organization of the Scout Movement and was the sixth President of the Boy Scouts of Japan, contributing to the success of the 13th World Scout Jamboree held August 2 to 10, 1971 on the western side of Mount Fuji.

== Background ==
Matsukata was son of the early Meiji Period Finance Minister and genrō, Matsukata Masayoshi.

In 1972, Matsukata was awarded the Bronze Wolf, the only distinction of the World Organization of the Scout Movement, awarded by the World Scout Committee for exceptional services to world Scouting. In 1973 he posthumously received the highest distinction of the Scout Association of Japan, the Golden Pheasant Award.

An experienced mountaineer and lifelong alpinist, Matsukata led Japan's 39-person expedition to Mount Everest in 1970.

== See also ==
- List of 20th-century summiters of Mount Everest

Scouting
Preceded by Hidesaburo Kurushima	Chief Scout of the Scout Association of Japan; 1971–1973	Succeeded by Akira Watanabe
