= Michiharu Mishima =

Japanese politician

- 三島 通陽
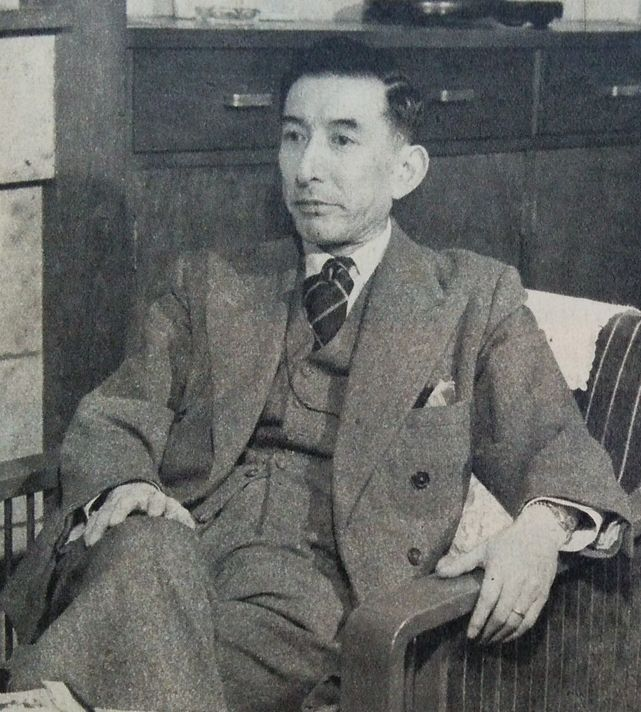
- Mishima in 1953

Member of the House of Councillors
- In office 3 May 1947 – 2 May 1950
- Preceded by: Constituency established
- Succeeded by: Multi-member district
- Constituency: National district

Member of the House of Peers
- In office 21 December 1929 – 2 May 1947 Elected by the Viscounts

Personal details
- Born: 1 January 1897 Azabu, Tokyo, Japan
- Died: 20 April 1965 (aged 68)
- Party: Ryokufūkai
- Other political affiliations: NCP (1947–1950)
- Parent: Yatarō Mishima (father)
- Relatives: Mishima Michitsune (grandfather); Kinpei Matsuoka (father-in-law)
- Education: Gakushuin University
- Occupation: Novelist, playwright, drama critic
- Known for: Co-founder of the Boy Scouts of Japan
- Nickname: Shōdō Mishima (pen name)

Viscount Michiharu Mishima (三島 通陽, Mishima Michiharu; 1 January 1897 – 20 April 1965) was a novelist, playwright and drama critic. His pen name was Shōdō Mishima (三島 章道 Mishima Shōdō).

== Early life ==
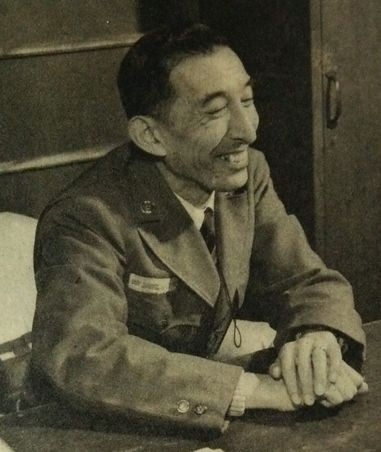
Michiharu Mishima, January 1953

J. S. Wilson and Michiharu Mishima, Chief Scout of Japan, at the national training camp at Lake Yamanaka, on the slopes of Mount Fuji, December 1952.

Mishima was born in Azabu, Tōkyō, to an aristocratic family. His grandfather Michitsune Mishima had been ennobled as a viscount in the new Japanese nobility in 1884, while his father was Yatarō Mishima, the 8th Governor of the Bank of Japan. His mother was Marquis Takauta Shijō (四条 隆謌 Shijō Takauta)'s third daughter, Kaneko (加根子), through whom he was related to the old court aristocracy and the greater Fujiwara clan. His younger sister was married to Yoshi Hijikata.

He was a Peers School graduate, and succeeded his father as the third Viscount Mishima in 1919.

== Scouting career ==
Mishima formed the nationwide Boy Scouts of Japan with Count Futara Yoshinori in 1922, with Shimpei Gotō at its helm. He was elected as Associate Board Chairman at age 25. He became the first president of the Boy Scout Association of Japan and also served as the head of the central training grounds. In 1941, he was awarded the Blue Ribbon Medal for philanthropy. He held a Scouting exhibition in February 1946, the first of its kind since the end of World War II. In 1950, he transferred the Boy Scouts Association of Japan headquarters to his villa and home in West Nasuno, Tochigi Prefecture. This site is now a permanent camping grounds for the Boy Scouts of Japan known as the Nasuno Camping Grounds. In 1951, he was elected to serve as the fourth Chief Scout of Japan at the National General Assembly. J. S. Wilson presented the Wood Badge to Mishima, which he had earned at Gilwell Park after the Austrian World Scout Jamboree. In 1953, he received the (きじ章 kijishō) from the Boy Scout Association of Japan for meritorious deeds and services. In 1961, he was awarded the Bronze Wolf by the World Organization of the Scout Movement for exceptional services to world Scouting. From 25 February to 7 March 1965, he wrote his serial Scout Jūwa (スカウト十話) for the Mainichi Shimbun, his final work. Mishima died on 20 April, and a (日本連盟 Nippon Remmei) funeral service was held on 24 April.

Mishima's handwriting can be found on the stone monument at 'Japan's First Boy Scout Camping Ground' on the banks of Lake Biwa in Omatsuzaki (Otsu City, Shiga Prefecture).

== Political career ==
Mishima was a member of the House of Peers and the House of Councillors and was parliamentary vice-minister to the Ministry of Education, Culture, Sports, Science and Technology.

== Literature ==
- 和訳孟子 Wayaku Mōshi (1918, Daidōkan)
- パトロールシステム Patrol System (1925, author Roland Philipps)
- 少年団指揮者教範 Shōnendan Shikisha Kyōhan: Aids to Scoutmastership (author Robert Baden-Powell)
- 満州及上海に正しき日本を観る 附国際聯盟と我裏南洋 Manshū Oyobi Shanhai ni Tadashiki Nihon o Miru: Fukokusai Remmei to Wagaura Nan'yō (1932, Tōgakusha)
- 世界少年団劇集 Sekai Shōnendan Gekishū (1933, Boy Scouts Association of Japan)
- 郊外健児教育 Kōgai Kenji Kyōiku (1933, author: ロアゾウ, Boy Scouts Association of Japan)
- 日満健児工作 Nichiman Kenji Kōsaku (1934, Tōgakusha)
- 伊太利は奮起した Itarii wa Funki Shita (1939, Jitsugyō no Nihon Sha)
- 少年団概論 Shōnendan Gairon (1939, author: ロアゾウ, Kyōikukenkyūsha)
- 世界児童劇集 附少年団劇集 Sekai Jidō Gekishū: Fushōnendan Gekishū (1940, Shōkasha)
- 戦時下の世界青少年運動 Senjishita no Seikai Shōnendan (1940, Nihon Hyōronsha)
- 少年団指導の理念と実践 Shōnendan Shidō no Rinen to Jissen (1942, Sangakushobō)
- 音なき交響曲 Otonaki Kōkyōkyoku (1958, Hōbunkan)
- 十人百話-9 ボーイスカウト十話 Jūnin Hyakuwa-9: Boy Scout Jūwa (1965, Mainichi Shimbun)

== Films ==
- 平和の勇士 Heiwa no Yūshi (1926, Film Institute of Social Education) monochrome, silent film

== Operas ==
- 歌劇 ボーイスカウト Kajū: Boy Scout (1925, Takarazuka Revue/Yukigumi)

== Ancestry ==
Ancestry

Ancestors of Michiharu Mishima

8. Mishima Matsushima
4. Viscount Mishima Michitsune (1835-1888)
2. Viscount Mishima Yatarō (1867-1919)
1. Viscount Mishima Michiharu
24. Daigo Teruhisa (1760-1801)
12.Shijō Takaari (1792-1857)
25. Hachisuka Sachiko (1771-1838)
6. Marquess Shijō Takauta (1828-1898)
3. Lady Shijō Kaneko
14. Nakai Yukimasa
7. Hijikata Haruko (d. 1908)

Scouting
Preceded by Isamu Takeshita	Chief Scout of the Scout Association of Japan; 1951–1965	Succeeded by Hidesaburō Kurushima
