= Scout Association of Japan =

National Scouting organization

- Japanese: ボーイスカウト日本連盟
- Headquarters: Hongō, Bunkyō, Tokyo
- Country: Japan
- Founded: 1922
- Membership: 109,528 (2017)
- Affiliation: World Organization of the Scout Movement
- Website www.scout.or.jp

Beaver Scout	Cub Scout	Scout, Venturer, Rover and leader

The Scout Association of Japan (ボーイスカウト日本連盟, Bōi Sukauto Nihon Renmei) is the major Scouting organization of Japan. Starting with boys only, the organization was known as Boy Scouts of Japan from 1922 to 1971, and as Boy Scouts of Nippon from 1971 to 1995, when it became coeducational in all sections, leading to neutral naming. Scouting activity decreased radically during World War II but slowly recovered; membership at the end of May 2017 was 99,779.

== History ==
=== Early years ===
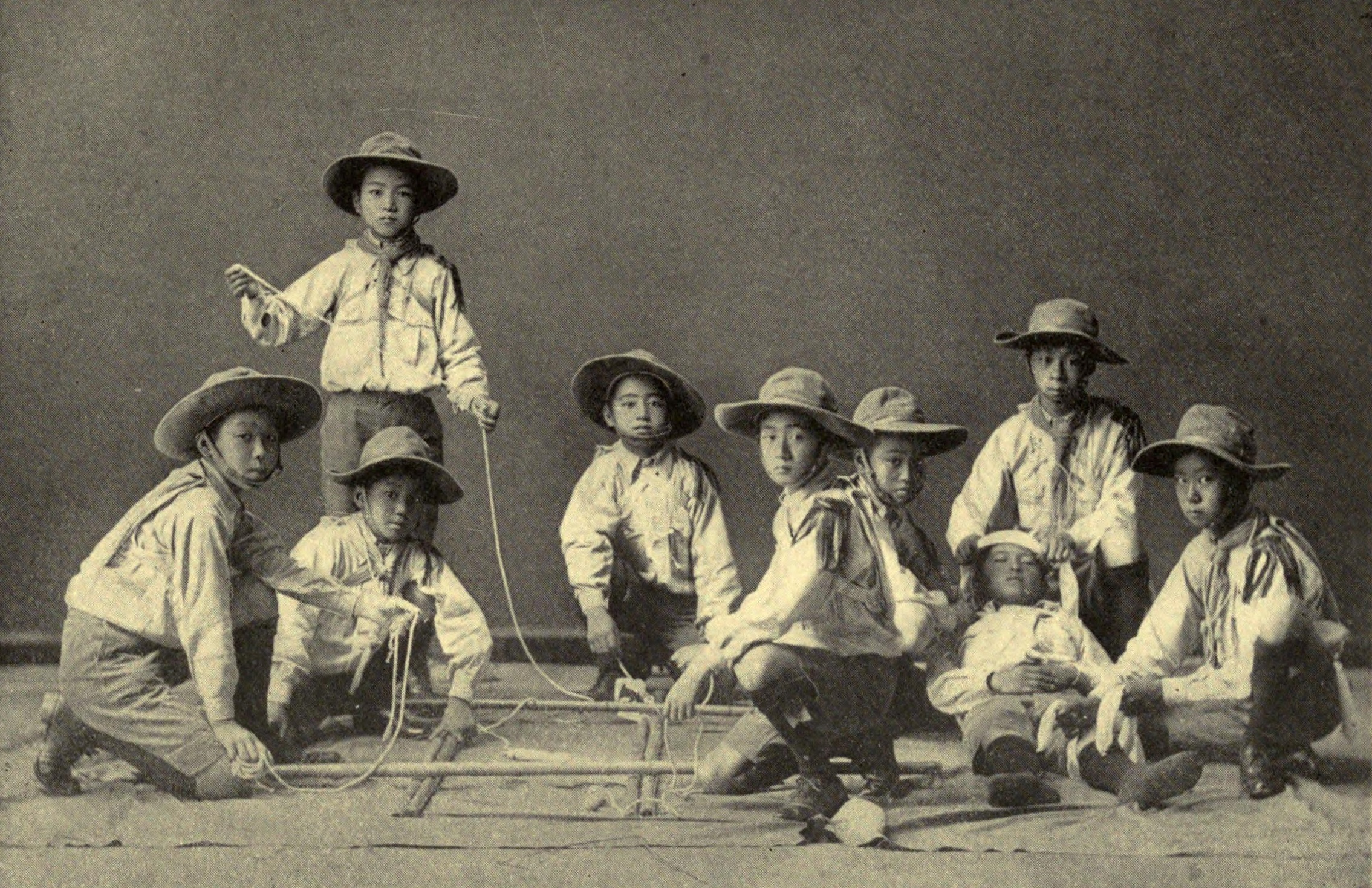
Japanese Boy Scouts – Yokohama, 1912 (from The Japan Gazette, 3 April 1912)

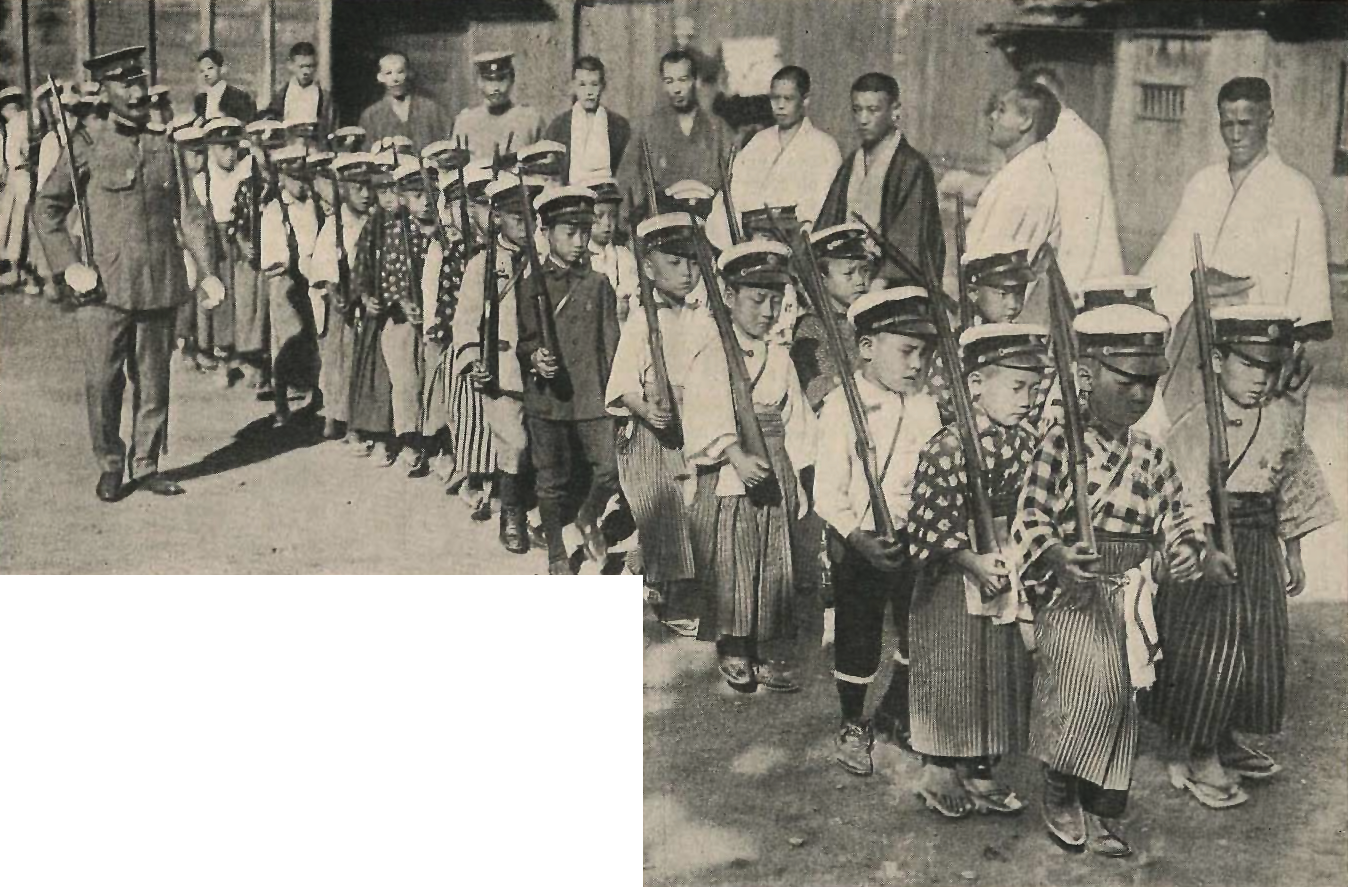
A 1916 photograph of Japanese Boy Scouts drilling with rifles (from 13 January 1916 Leslie's Illustrated Weekly Newspaper)

Scouting was introduced to Japan in the autumn of 1909 by ambassador Akizuki Satsuo and Japanese teacher Hōjō Tokiyuki, who had visited England in 1908. A Japanese text based on Scouting for Boys was published as early as 1910, and a few sporadic troops sprang up, without any cohesion and without a proper grasp of the principles and aims of Scouting.

In 1911, General Maresuke Nogi went to England in attendance on Prince Yorihito Higashifushimi for the coronation of King George V. The general, also known as the "Defender of Port Arthur", was introduced to General Robert Baden-Powell, the "Defender of Mafeking".

The Scout troop in Yokohama welcomed Baden-Powell during his visit on 2 April 1912. The troop consisted primarily of British boys, but, from the beginning, also included a small number of American, Danish, and Norwegian boys and was led by a British Scouter, merchant Clarence Griffin. The 1st Yokohama, as it was called, had its first meeting on October 16, 1911, and was registered as a British Troop Abroad. The Troop charter and a Scoutmaster Warrant for Clarence Griffin were issued by Baden-Powell. With this registration only those with British nationality were able to "officially" join the troop, although this rule seems to have been loosely enforced. The Scout Association of Japan recognizes Clarence Griffin as Japan's first Scoutmaster and the "1st Yokohama", now the International Boy Scouts, Troop 1, as Japan's first recognized Boy Scout troop with a marker placed on his grave in the Yokohama Foreign General Cemetery. In 1918, at the urging of missionary Bro. Joseph Janning, the Group registration was changed to "international" and boys of all nationalities were officially allowed to join the troop. In 1923 this Group became the first directly registered Group of the newly formed Boy Scout International Bureau (now World Scout Bureau). The Troop remains active in Yokohama as the International Boy Scouts, Troop 1.

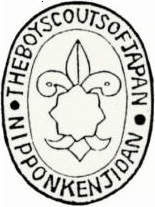
seal of the Nippon Kenjidan, precursor to the modern association

During his short 1912 visit to Japan Baden-Powell did, however, see something of the Kenjinsha, an old time youth movement. During this period homegrown Japanese troops began to develop and existed alongside expatriate troops in Yokohama, Kobe and Osaka. Hiroshi Koshiba started a Tokyo-based group in 1913. At the time of the coronation of the Taishō Emperor in 1915, Scouts were organized in Tokyo, Shizuoka, Kyoto and Hokkaido.

In 1920 three delegates, Toyomatsu Shimoda, Hiroshi Koshiba, and Richard Suzuki, attended the 1st World Scout Jamboree at Olympia, London. Shimoda and Koshiba were both adults and, when they met Richard Suzuki aboard ship and learned he was a Scout, they invited him to join. Richard was the son of a Japanese father and a British mother and was traveling to England for study. Richard was a member of the Yokohama international troop and, being the only Scout aged delegate, Richard carried the Japanese placard in the "Procession of the Nations" during the opening ceremonies.

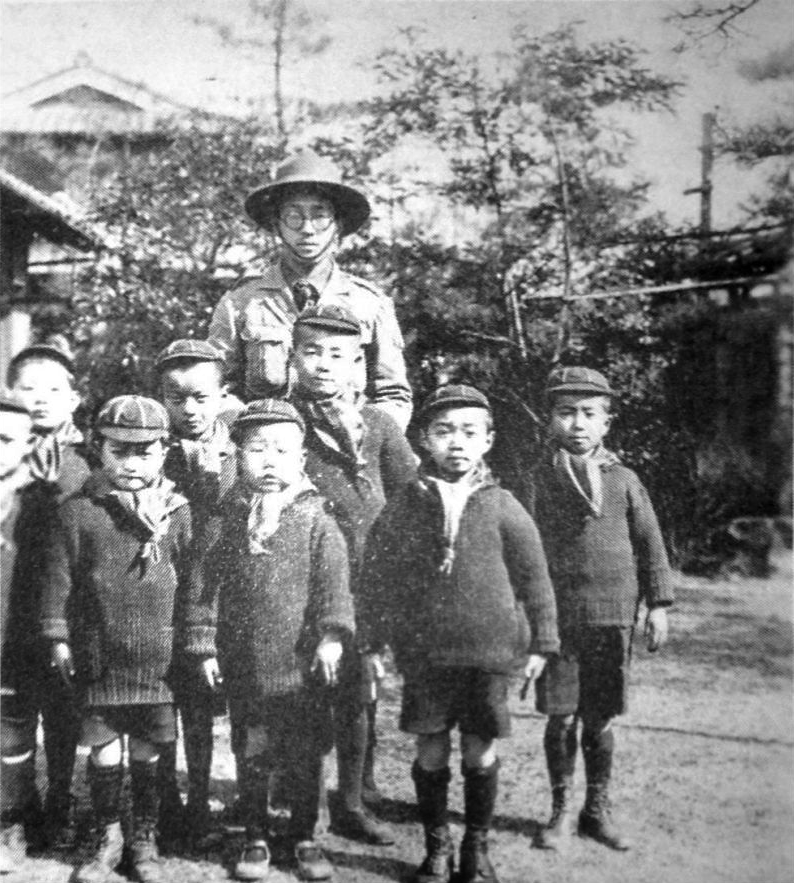
Seiichiro Furuta with Cub Scouts c. 1924

In 1920 Crown Prince, later Emperor, Hirohito also visited Great Britain, experienced Scouting first hand and expressed the hope that Scouting would develop fully in Japan and join the world movement. The Nippon Kenjidan, forerunner of the "Boy Scouts of Japan" was founded in 1921, when Shimoda began a national group that was restructured and merged with other groups in April 1922. The organization was reformed as the Boy Scouts of Japan in April 1922 by Count Futara Yoshinori and Viscount Mishima Michiharu. Japan was admitted as a member of the World Organization of the Scout Movement later in 1922.

The 1923 Great Kantō earthquake brought the work of the Scouts of Tokyo and Kobe to the notice of the general public. Count Gotō Shimpei, a doctor and a statesman, was made the first Chief Scout of Japan and tasked with the rebuilding. As Minister of Railways, Count Gotō travelled around the country, and was able to promote Scouting in his spare time. In 1924, Japan fielded a full contingent of 25 to the 2nd World Scout Jamboree in Denmark under Rear Admiral Count Sano Tsuneha, during which Count Sano attended a Wood Badge course at Gilwell Park. Count Sano returned to Japan and created Japan's own training course, called Jisshu-jo, for both Cub and Scout leaders, which is still used to this day, after completion of two preliminary courses, Koshu-kai and Kenshu-kai.

Count Futara Yoshinori was the first Japanese member of the World Scout Committee of the World Organization of the Scout Movement from 1931 until 1939.

In February 1937, Isamu Takeshita was appointed head of the Boy Scouts of Japan, the Sea Scouts, and the YMCA, as part of the general militarization of Japanese sports and athletics taking place at that time.

Japanese military authorities did not consistently encourage the Scouting movement in occupied territories. Where local conditions were favorable, authorities would permit local Scouting or introduce Japanese-style Scouting, or Shōnendan, and sometimes even made this compulsory. On the other hand, where conditions were not favorable, and anti-Japanese sentiments were likely to be nurtured through Scouting, the authorities would prohibit it entirely.

=== World War II and aftermath ===
Scouting in Japan suffered almost complete eclipse in World War II, and took time to recover. Occupation authorities had blacklisted the ex-military officers, disregarding age or sympathies. This held Count Sano and others back from their sincere desire to restore Boy Scouts of Japan to its former correct basis. Gradually, military supervision was relaxed and the original group began to take over, with beneficial results.

The occupation period was difficult on Scouting, just as it was on Japanese daily life. The participant patch (usually embroidered or woven) for the first National Scout Rally was printed on paper, because of the financial situation of that time. Period pieces of Scouting memorabilia from that time are rare and highly prized. Japan was re-admitted as a full member of the World Organization of the Scout Movement in 1950, remarkable and unique in the history of nations in which Scouting has been interrupted. Within ten years of World War II, Scout membership had grown to 80,000. In 1957, the first Wood Badge course by that name was held in Japan. In 1959, Japan held the Second Nippon Jamboree, shortly after the conclusion of the 10th World Scout Jamboree in the Philippines.

=== Modern period ===
In 1961, Viscount Michiharu Mishima was awarded the Bronze Wolf, awarded by the World Scout Committee for exceptional services to world Scouting. Other recipients from Japan include Hidesaburō Kurushima, chairman of the national board and international commissioner, in 1967, Taizō Ishizaka in 1971, Saburō Matsukata in 1972, Shintarō Negishi in 1975, Akira Watanabe in 1977, Yorihiro Matsudaira in 1981, August S. Narumi in 1984, Ichirō Terao in 1985, and Yoritake Matsudaira in 2012.

In 1971, BSJ hosted three major World Scouting events, the 13th World Scout Jamboree and the 1st World Scout Forum in Shizuoka, and the 23rd World Scout Conference in Tokyo.

After the 13th World Scout Jamboree in 1971, there was discussion about the national association's name. The word "Japan" is not Japanese, rather based on a southern Chinese dialect, which Marco Polo heard as "Zippang", eventually becoming "Japan" in English. The Japanese corrected the association's name to match their own language, as "Boy Scouts of Nippon" in 1971.

Since 1974, SAJ has every year invited some 45 Scouts from Scout associations in the Asia-Pacific Region to take part in major international events such as Jamborees, Ventures, Agoonorees and Rover Scouting events.

In 1995, Japanese Scouting became coeducational and, after that point, to use "Boy Scout" would strictly be incorrect. Further it was decided that the proper national name "Nippon" was not well known worldwide. Japanese Scouting once again changed its national association's name in English to the "Scout Association of Japan" (SAJ). However, there is contradiction in the original charter, that Boy Scouts of Japan (or Nippon) is still used in the writing of the Japanese language Scout Constitution. Therefore, it was decided that the official name is to be in the Japanese language, and the English expression is for the convenience and benefit of overseas Scouts to connect with Japanese Scouting.

SAJ celebrated its 75th anniversary of founding of the National Scout Association in 1997 and hosted the second Asia-Pacific Regional Top Leaders' Summit Conference in Gotemba and Tokyo.

Scouting in Japan has grown steadily into the place it is in social education for young people. The aim of the Scout Association of Japan is to help young people become responsible humanitarian citizens, who can appreciate and practice loyalty, courage and self-respect in an international perspective. With the support of volunteer leaders, the Scout movement in Japan provides fun-filled, challenging programs, with an emphasis on developing each young person's character, health, abilities and sense of service to others.

The Scout Association of Japan is a non-political, voluntary movement, with open subscription. The geographic structure of Japanese Scouting is the council, generally conforming to prefecture boundaries. Japanese Scouting also exists abroad, in communities with large native Japanese populations, such as Amsterdam (Netherlands) and Singapore.

In recent years, SAJ held several international events, which include the sixth Nippon Agoonoree in Ehime in August 1999, the 5th Nippon Venture in Ōita in August 2000, the National Rover Moot 2001 in Aichi in August 2001, and the 23rd Asia-Pacific/13th Nippon Jamboree in Osaka in August 2002.

Japanese Scouts are actively involved in international understanding and cooperation programs, such as the ORT twinning project by Rovers with the Bangladesh Scouts, and nationwide fundraising activities for refugees in UNHCR camps.

Scout Association of Japan celebrated its 90th anniversary in 2012

The 23rd World Scout Jamboree took place at Kirara Beach, Yamaguchi, in 2015. The theme was "和 Wa: A Spirit of Unity".

=== Chief Scouts ===
- 1st Shimoda Toyomatsu, 1924–1929
- 2nd Gotō Shinpei, 1935–1936
- 3rd Isamu Takeshita, 1937–1945
- 4th Mishima Michiharu, 1951–1965
- 5th Hidesaburō Kurushima, 1966–1970
- 6th Saburō Matsukata, 1971–1973
- 7th Akira Watanabe, 1974–2003
- 8th Shōichi Saba, 2003 – April 1, 2006
- 9th Tsunao Hashimoto, April 1, 2006 – March 31, 2010
- 10th Takayasu Okushima, April 1, 2010 – May 1, 2024 (his death)

== Scouting program and ideals ==
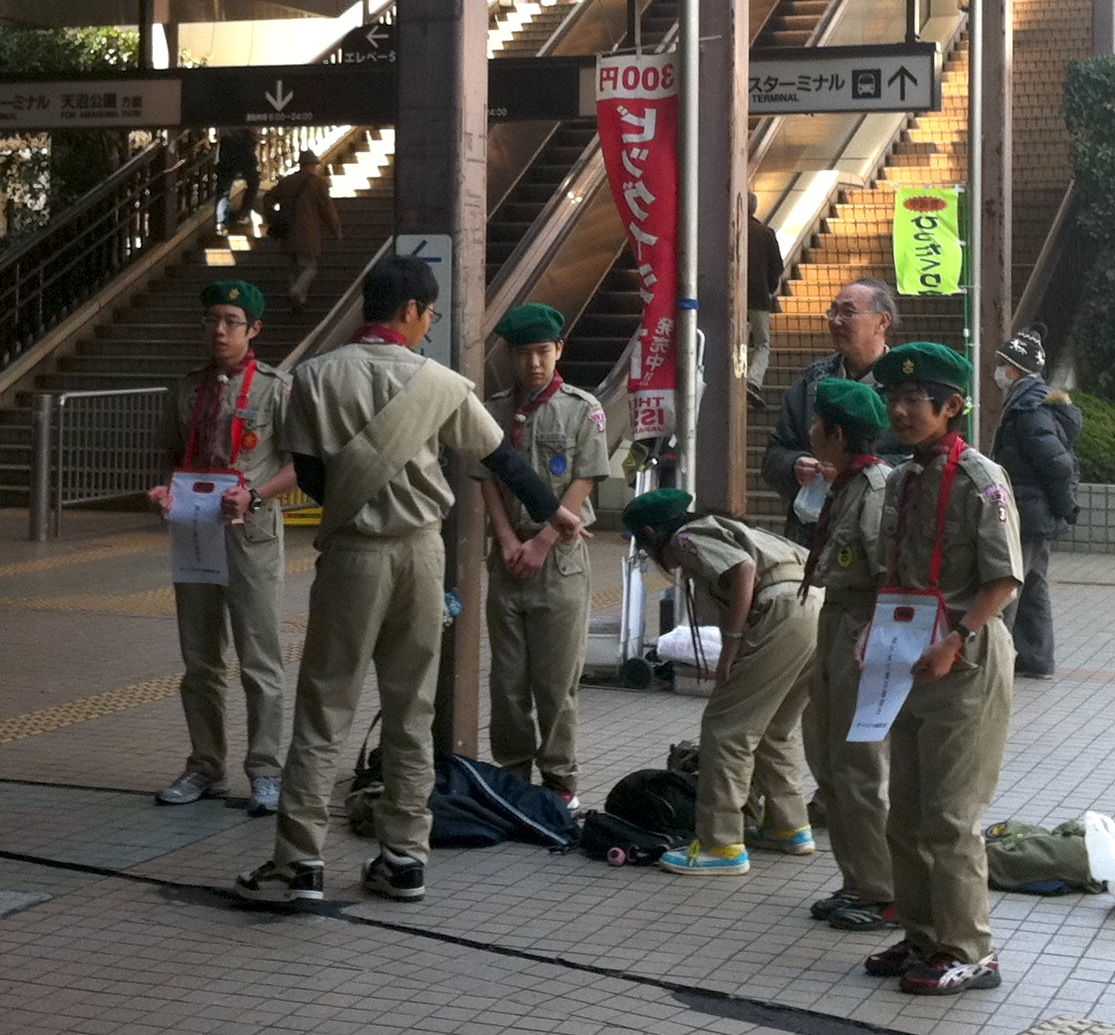
Scouts asking for donations after the 2011 Tōhoku earthquake and tsunami

The Scout Motto is Sonaeyo Tsuneni (そなえよつねに), translating as "Be Prepared" in Japanese.

The Scout emblem incorporates the sacred mirror Yata no Kagami, which represents wisdom and honesty.

The Japanese Scout uniform consists of a brown vest, brown pants with light blue pockets, and light blue cap for Beaver Scouts; a blue shirt, pants, and cap for Cub Scouts; khaki with green line edge shirt and pants, and a green beret for Boy Scouts; and a khaki shirt and pants, and green beret for Venture, Rover, and adult Scouts. Prior to the 23rd World Scout Jamboree, the SAJ introduced new uniforms and phased in new insignia for all sections. Standardized council insignia were introduced for the first time in 2015. The new council badges are 4.8 cm x 11 cm, smaller than the standard US version.

The program sections are:

- Beaver Scouts (Japanese: ビーバースカウト), age 6 to 8
- Cub Scouts (Japanese: カブスカウト), age 8 to 11
- Boy Scouts (Japanese: ボーイスカウト), age 11 to 14
- Venture Scouts (Japanese: ベンチャースカウト), age 14 to 20
- Rover Scouts (Japanese: ローバースカウト), age 18 to 24

=== Scout Promise and Oath ===
In the Scout Association of Japan, Beaver Scouts and Cub Scouts use the term "Promise" (やくそく). Scouts above are use the term "Oath" (ちかい). However, in the official English website of the Scout Association of Japan, these are all called "Promise".

Promise in Japan
Level	Japanese	Translation
Beaver Scouts	ぼく（わたくし）は みんなとなかよくします ビーバー隊のきまりをまもります	I will be friendly to everyone and protect the Beaver Scout Law
Cub Scouts	ぼく（わたくし）は まじめにしっかりやります カブ隊のさだめを守ります	I promise to behave honestly and steadily, and to follow the Pack Laws.
Scouts and above	私は、名誉にかけて、次の3条の実行をちかいます。: 1. 神（仏）と国とに誠を尽くしおきてを守ります。; 2. いつも、他の人々をたすけます。; 3. からだを強くし、心をすこやかに、徳を養います。	We will be sincere to God (Buddha) and country, and will obey the commandments. Always help others. Strengthen your body, keep your mind healthy, and cultivate virtue..

=== Scout Law ===
- A Scout is faithful. (スカウトは誠実である。)
- A Scout is friendly. (スカウトは友情にあつい。)
- A Scout is courteous. (スカウトは礼儀正しい。)
- A Scout is kind. (スカウトは親切である。)
- A Scout is cheerful. (スカウトは快活である。)
- A Scout is thrifty. (スカウトは質素である。)
- A Scout is courageous. (スカウトは勇敢である。)
- A Scout is thankful. (スカウトは感謝の心をもつ。)

=== Ranks ===
The ranks are:

- Tenderfoot (Sho-kyū 初級スカウト)
- 2nd Class (Ni-kyū 2級スカウト)
- 1st Class (Ikkyū 1級スカウト)
- Chrysanthemum (Kiku 菊スカウト)

The highest rank of the Boy Scouts is the Kiku Scout (菊スカウト). "Kiku" is the Japanese word for chrysanthemum.

The highest rank of the Venture Scouts is the Fuji Scout (富士スカウト). It is named after Mount Fuji.

=== Councils ===
The SAJ operates and maintains 48 councils, each corresponding to prefectural borders and a National Council for top-level staff and employees.

Prefecture	2015 membership	Founding year	Council badge or totem
Aichi	11,143	1949	Prefectural flower Kakitsubata (Iris laevigata) with two shachihoko as supporters
Akita	392		Akita Kantō bamboo pole hoisting washi paper lanterns, which hang from horizontal bars; traditional symbols of the council include namahage done in aizome (藍染め), the Japanese process of indigo dyeing
Aomori	440		Prefectural map superimposed with two Bewick's swans (Cygnus bewickii) in flight and an apple, as Aomori Prefecture is Japan's largest producer of apples
Chiba	6,113		The Sun surmounted with many seiyō aburana blossoms, as the name of Chiba Prefecture in Japanese is "thousand" and "leaves"
Ehime	1,314		Kurushima-Kaikyō Bridge, prefectural flag, and Mount Ishizuchi
Fukui	794		Two dinosaur silhouettes, Fukuiraptor facing left, and Fukuisaurus facing right, representing the Fukui Prefectural Dinosaur Museum, superimposed with the prefectural flower Narcissus (Narcissus tazetta), on a background of dark blue as the prefectural flag
Fukuoka	2,923		Plum blossom representing Dazaifu Tenman-gū, known for its 6,000 ume (Asian plum) trees belonging to 167 varieties, similar to the prefectural flag
Fukushima	1,025		Stylized hiragana of ふ (fu), the central design of the prefectural flag and Mount Bandai with Polaris to the right and Lake Inawashiro/Goshiki-numa-in 1924, the venue was used as a place for social education through activities conducted by the Boy Scouts of Japan, it was the first time for the royal family to participate and it was the site of the first All Japan Youth Federation Conference (少年団日本連盟大会)
Gifu	1,838		Traditional housing called gassho-zukuri, as well as a bird effigy of a rock ptarmigan (Lagopus muta, known as the raichō (雷鳥), which means "thunder bird", the official bird of Gifu Prefecture and is a protected species nationwide
Gunma	1,582		Horse caricature 群馬ちゃん "Gumma-chan" and map, as ancient Gunma was a center of horse trading and breeding, as well as stables for the emperor
Hiroshima	1,082	1950	A ribbon bearing the English words "Character Health Handicraft Service" in all directions in the form of a traditional Japanese mizuhiki knot, to suggest the shape of a dove in flight, flanked by coordinates 34°23'48"N 132°27'35"E, which are the Prefectural Offices (Kencho) for Hiroshima; traditional symbols of the council include a dove symbolizing peace and the torii gate of Itsukushima Shrine
Hokkaidō	1,594	1950	Tanchō (red-crowned crane, Grus japonensis) and map of the island
Hyōgo	6,623	1950	Port of Kobe, Mount Rokkō, Akashi Kaikyō Bridge, Himeji Castle and Oriental white stork (Ciconia boyciana)
Ibaraki	2,433	1951	Sailboat, Mount Tsukuba and Lake Kasumigaura, Scout caricature in traditional campaign hat, wearing a backpack and whistling
Ishikawa	1,473		Ishikawa kanji (石川) stylized to form Scout sign
Iwate	538		Train from the children's story "Night on the Galactic Railroad" written by Kenji Miyazawa who was born in Iwate, Mount Iwate, kanji (岩手) stylized into train tracks, Japanese green pheasant, and salmon-there are good catches of salmon off the coast of Iwate and some spawn upriver in Morioka, about 200 km from the Pacific Ocean in the fall
Kagawa	625		An olive branch, as Shōdoshima is famous for being the first place in Japan to successfully cultivate olives, and the Great Seto Bridge, the first bridge across the Seto Inland Sea-almost all of the bridge is part of Kagawa Prefecture, almost all the way to Okayama
Kagoshima	470	1946	Kagoshima kanji in green edomoji on orange, representing the local mikan, hence the name Satsuma orange, and map of the prefecture made from the same kanji, with Sakurajima volcano and the sun wheel kamon symbol of the Shimazu clan of Satsuma Domain
Kanagawa	8,234		Common gull (Larus canus), golden-rayed lily (Lilium auratum) and a stylized wave representing Shōnan beach
Kōchi	111		Sakamoto Ryōma in white on red, the colors of its most famous dish, katsuo tataki, made by lightly searing and seasoning tuna
Kumamoto	919		Mount Aso volcano, Kumamoto Castle signature curved stone walls, known as musha-gaeshi, as well as wooden overhangs, designed to prevent attackers from penetrating the castle, and Gentian (Gentiana scabra var. buergeri) flower
Kyōto	2,452	1915	Daimonji, maple leaves, and Kinkakuji
Mie	740		Ise ebi, Suzuka Mountains-named in the song of Mie Council, and three shuriken, as Mie is the birthplace of the ninja and home to the Iga-ryū Ninja Museum
Miyagi	998		Caricature of Date Masamune as an onigiri–Sendai is known for its rice
Miyazaki	655		An ukiyo-e-style ocean wave and kagura god dancer 神楽, as Amenominakanushi primordial god of Japan creation-Miyazaki is famous for ocean views at Cape Toi, and Seagaia Ocean Dome, once the world's biggest indoor water park and artificial beach; and is connected with Amanoiwato Shrine, where the sun goddess Amaterasu was found hiding in a cave by Tajikarao and enticed out by a comic and bawdy dance by Ame-no-Uzume-no-Mikoto, thus creating the world
Nagano	1,188	1948	Hida Mountains
Nagasaki	533		Dragon dancer and ball representing the Sun or the Moon which the dragon chases at the Nagasaki Kunchi festival's Ja-odori—when the dragon consumes the ball, the sky is dim, calling the rain clouds, carried out as a rainmaking ritual thousands of years ago in China—representing Nagasaki Chinatown
Nara	2,520		Daibutsu at Tōdai-ji, fireworks on Mount Wakakusa in an annual festival known as Yamayaki the fourth Saturday of each January, when the entire mountain between two temples, Tōdai-ji and Kōfuku-ji, is set ablaze
Niigata	884		Crested ibis (Nipponia nippon), tulip (Tulipa gesneriana) and Mount Myōkō
Ōita	505		Stylized onsen map symbolization ♨, Bungo-ume blossom (Prunus mume var. bungo) and Japanese white-eye (Zosterops japonica)
Okayama	1,025		Momotarō and cohorts dog, monkey, and pheasant, Okayama Castle and a red oni, based on local legend
Okinawa	574	1956-Scouting in the Ryukyu Islands	Shureimon gate-the four Chinese characters framed on the gate read 守禮之邦 Shu, rei, no, and kuni, which mean 'Land of Propriety', however the kanji are written right-to-left 邦之禮守 in pre-World War II reading order
Ōsaka	8,797	1949	Hyotan calabash bottles representing Toyotomi Hideyoshi, sakura blossoms
Saga	412	1949	Black-billed magpie (Pica pica)
Saitama	6,509		Map superimposed with primrose (Primula sieboldii)
Shiga	1,278		Map of Lake Biwa superimposed on three blue geometrics symbolizing the waves of Lake Biwa, and which represent the three districts of Shiga Council
Shimane	446	1950	Izumo-taisha shimenawa, Shimane's mascot "Mikoto-kun" based on Susanoo-no-Mikoto, and Yamata no Orochi
Shizuoka	5,319	1921	Mount Fuji and Scout silhouette with hiking staff waving traditional campaign hat
Tochigi	1,244		Map, Japanese horse chestnut (Aesculus turbinata), blue-and-white flycatcher (Cyanoptila cyanomelana) and Nikkō Tōshō-gū
Tokushima	373		Awa Odori dancer and rectangle inkan of old Awa Province, reading 阿波
Tōkyō	12,577		Tokyo Station
Tottori	506		Mandarin duck (Aix galericulata) on a backdrop of the Tottori Sand Dunes; traditional symbols of the council include Kitarō caricature in Scout beret, Medama-oyaji seated atop
Toyama	1,672		Bird effigy of a rock ptarmigan (Lagopus muta, known as the raichō (雷鳥), which means "thunder bird", the official bird of Toyama Prefecture and is a protected species nationwide, as well as mountains for the stylized logo based on the prefectural flag which form a rebus of Toyama representing Mount Tateyama, enclosing a tulip (Tulipa) in the "o"
Wakayama	812		Whale tail representing the Taiji Whale Museum in Taiji
Yamagata	221		Benibana Safflower (Carthamus tinctorius), cherries as Yamagata Prefecture is the largest producer of cherries in Japan, and a stylized map of the prefecture
Yamaguchi	1,020	1948	Choruru caricature in Scout beret, and amanatsu, a yellowish orange citrus hybrid fruit discovered in 1740 in Yamaguchi, and seven bitter summer mandarin (Citrus natsudaidai) blossoms representing the council's 70th anniversary in 2018
Yamanashi	755		Two Scouts in traditional campaign hats canoeing toward Mount Fuji

== Decline in membership ==
Per SAJ records, membership dropped from 332,000 in 1983 to 115,000 in 2016.

Total membership at the end of March 2012 was 143,272.

By the end of March 2015, membership was 105,676

SAJ statistical data as of May, 2017 is 99,779, a loss of 9,749 from 2016, the first time to drop below 100,000 since the 1960s.

== Awards for Japanese Scouters ==
Golden Pheasant Award (きじ章, kiji-shō)
The highest award, suspended from a white ribbon with two red stripes
Silver Eagle Award (たか章, taka-shō)
The second-highest award, suspended from a white ribbon with two green stripes (Note: The Japanese term taka (鷹 たか) may be variously translated "hawk", "raptor", and "white eagle".)
Silver Cuckoo Award (かっこう章, kakkō-shō)
The third-highest award, suspended from a white ribbon with two yellow stripes

== Notable Scouts ==
- Ryutaro Hashimoto, the 82nd and 83rd Prime Minister of Japan
- Yukio Hattori, the fifth president of the Hattori Nutrition College, commentator on the Japanese cooking competition program Iron Chef
- Soichi Noguchi, Japanese astronaut
- Makoto Raiku, manga artist (Zatch Bell!)
- Shigeru Miyamoto, Japanese video game designer

== International Scouting ==
The Scout Association of Japan hosted the 13th World Scout Jamboree on the Asagiri Plateau, Shizuoka Prefecture, in 1971, and the nearly simultaneous 23rd World Scout Conference. Since then, it has hosted numerous other international activities, including the Asia Pacific Top Leaders Summit in 1997, the Asia-Pacific Multi-Purpose Workshop in 2000, and the 23rd Asia-Pacific/13th Nippon Jamboree in 2002. Japan also hosted the 23rd World Scout Jamboree in 2015 in Yamaguchi.

An exchange program between the Scout Association of Japan and the Boy Scouts of America was started in 1998, at the suggestion of then-Prime Minister Ryutaro Hashimoto in a 1996 meeting with U.S. President Bill Clinton.

== See also ==
- Kurushima Takehiko
- Koshiba Hiroshi
- Hōjō Tokiyuki
- Isamu Takeshita
- Girl Scouts of Japan
- Baden-Powell Scouts Association – Japan
- World Buddhist Scout Brotherhood
- Boy Scouts of Manchukuo
