= Yoshinori Futara =

Japanese Imperial Household Ministry official and Scouting leader

- 二荒 芳徳
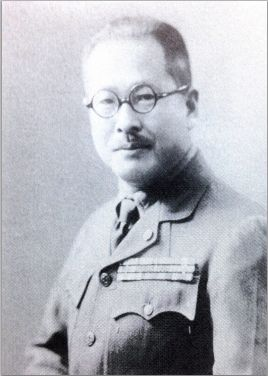
- Futura

Personal details
- Born: October 26, 1886
- Died: April 21, 1967 (aged 80)
- Awards: Golden Pheasant Award

Count Yoshinori Futara (二荒 芳徳, Futara Yoshinori, October 26, 1886 – April 21, 1967) was an official in the Imperial Household Ministry and a co-founder with Michiharu Mishima of the Boy Scouts of Japan in April 1922, with Shinpei Gotō at its helm.

Yoshinori Futara was awarded the title Count on November 22, 1909.

== Background ==
Count Futara was the first Japanese member of the World Scout Committee of the World Organization of the Scout Movement, from 1931 until 1939.

A Japanese Scout group led by Yoshinori Futara visited Germany in 1937. A photograph exists of Baldur von Schirach together with Futara as spectators at fight games of the Hitler Youth, the youth organisation of the National Socialist German Workers Party in Bremen, Germany, taken August 15, 1937.

In 1956 he received the highest distinction of the Scout Association of Japan, the Golden Pheasant Award.

== Published works ==
- Futara, Yoshinori and Sawada, Setsuzo (official of Foreign Affairs) 1924. Kotaishi Denka gogaiuki The Crown Prince's foreign travel record. Publishers Nichinichi Newspaper Company, Tokyo and Mainichi Newspaper Company, Osaka. Translated into English by the staff of the Osaka Mainichi
- Futara, Yoshinori and Sawada, Setsuzo 1926. The Crown Prince's European Tour. Translated into English by the staff of the Osaka Mainichi

== External links and references ==
- http://content.cdlib.org/view?docId=kt3g5020r9&chunk.id=dsc-1.2.7&query=korean&brand=oac
- Hirohito and the Making of Modern Japan by Herbert P. Bix
- http://forum.axishistory.com/viewtopic.php?t=101635
- http://www.ullsteinbild.de/
- An Official History of Scouting by Paul Moynihan https://books.google.com/books?id=q4vwlP5qJowC&dq=futara+yoshinori&pg=PA126
- https://web.archive.org/web/20091027071728/http://www.geocities.com/jtaliaferro.geo/fushimi.html
- http://www.unterstein.net/or/docs/JapanPeers.pdf
- http://www.oliver-rost.homepage.t-online.de/Japan_Pairie.txt
