= Shintarō Negishi =

- Shintarō Negishi

Shintarō Negishi (根岸 眞太郎, Negishi Shintarō) (-‡ 2005 to 2008) served as the Chairman of the National Executive Council of the Boy Scouts of Japan.

== Background ==
In 1975, Negishi was awarded the 105th Bronze Wolf, the only distinction of the World Organization of the Scout Movement, awarded by the World Scout Committee for exceptional services to world Scouting, at the 25th World Scout Conference. In 1994 he also received the highest distinction of the Scout Association of Japan, the Golden Pheasant Award.

== Works ==
- 根岸眞太郎監 (Shintarō Negishi), ed. (1992). 『ベーデン-パウエル: 英雄の2つの生涯 [Baden-Powell: The Two Lifes of a Hero] (in Japanese). Translated by 安齋忠恭監 (Tadashi Anzai). Industry Research Committee. ISBN 978-4882821182.。
