= Golden Pheasant Award =

- Owner: Scout Association of Japan
- Awarded for: Outstanding service to Scouting in Japan

The Golden Pheasant Award (きじ章, kiji-shō) is the highest award for adult leaders in the Scout Association of Japan. It is awarded by the Chief Scout of Japan, awarded for eminent achievement and meritorious service to the Association for a period of at least twenty years. It may be awarded to any member of a Scout Association affiliated with the World Organization of the Scout Movement.

The award consists of a medallion depicting a stylized golden pheasant, suspended from a white ribbon with two red stripes worn around the neck. The attendant uniform emblem, worn over the pocket, consists of two red stripes on a white background with a 5 mm golden device of the Japanese Scout emblem.

== Background ==
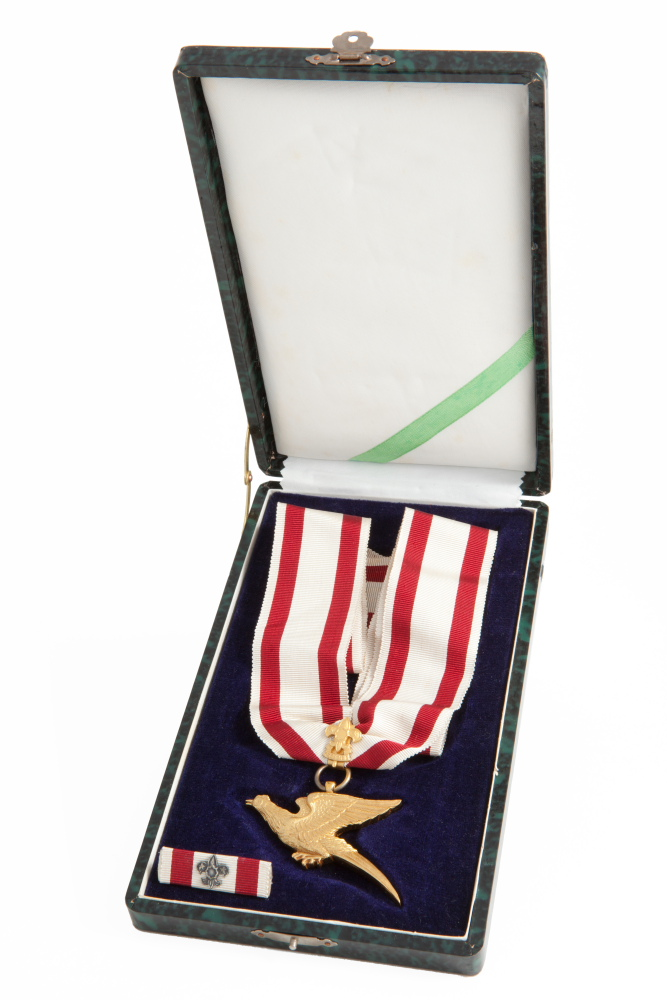
Golden Pheasant Award presented to Prime Minister of New Zealand Sir Walter Nash in 1957

The original Japanese list does not assign strict chronological numbering, rather by category. The first category is political, and in honorific order as number 1 is the Heisei emperor, although he received the award chronologically third in that category. The second category are Japanese Scouters, again starting with number 1 Michiharu Mishima. The third category are non-Japanese recipients, and again the list cycles back to 1, being Martin B. Williams. In addition, Akira Watanabe is out of numerical sequence.^{[a]}

Posthumously conferred are marked with (‡).^{[a]}

== Recipients ==
Award number	Year awarded	Name	Office	Representing
1	1952	Martin B. Williams	Founder of Tokyo 4 Scout group	United States
2	1952	J. S. Wilson		United Kingdom
3	1953	Richard Nixon		United States
1	1953	Michiharu Mishima	first president of the Boy Scout Association of Japan	
2	1953	Jinnojō Hayashi (林 甚之丞)		
3	1954	Sano Tsuneha	Elder (early Scouting movement notable)	
4	1955	Motojirō Ozaki	member of the Diet	‡
5	1955	Chūhachi Nakano (中野 忠ハ)		‡
6	1956	Gotō Shinpei	first Chief Scout of Japan	‡
7	1956	Yoshinori Futara	co-founder of the Boy Scouts of Japan in April 1922; General Commissioner	
4	1956	Daniel Spry		Canada
5	1957	Olave Baden-Powell		United Kingdom
6	1957	Peter Baden-Powell, 2nd Baron Baden-Powell		United Kingdom
7	1957	Arthur A. Schuck		United States
8	1957	John Thurman		United Kingdom
9	1957	Mohammad Reza Pahlavi		Iran
10	1957	Walter Nash		New Zealand
8	1959	Hidesaburō Kurushima	President of the Boy Scouts of Japan	
11	1959	Jorge B. Vargas		Philippines
12	1964	Constantine II of Greece		Greece
13	1964	Ellsworth Hunt Augustus		United States
9	1966	Taizō Ishizaka	Chairman of the National Board of the Boy Scouts of Japan	
14	1966	Gabriel Daza	Co-founder Boy Scouts of the Philippines (BSP). BSP President 1961-1968	Philippines
3	1967	Shigeru Yoshida	Prime Minister	
15	1967	Kim Jong-pil	Korea Scout Association President ? - June 6, 1969	Korea
16	1968	Gustavo J. Vollmer		Venezuela
17	1968	Irving J. Feist		United States
4	1970	Eisaku Satō	Prime Minister	
1	1971	Akihito	Crown Prince of Japan	
18	1971	Charles Dymoke Green, Jr.		United Kingdom
19	1971	William Durant Campbell		United States
10	1973	Saburō Matsukata	President of the Boy Scouts of Japan	‡
20	1973	Antonio C. Delgado		Philippines
21	1974	Gerald Ford		United States
22	1975	Elizabeth II		United Kingdom
23	1975	Prince Philip, Duke of Edinburgh		United Kingdom
11	1978	Kōgorō Uemura	Chairman of the National Board of the Boy Scouts of Japan	
12	1979	Akira Watanabe	President of the Boy Scouts of Japan	
24	1978	Birendra of Nepal		Nepal
13	1978	Ichirō Terao	Chairman of the National Board of the Boy Scouts of Japan	
14	1978	Yoshio Kobayashi (小林 芳夫)		
5	1979	Takeo Fukuda	Prime Minister	
15	1979	Seiichiro Furuta	Scouting pioneer	
16	1979	Tadatsugu Ozaki (尾崎 忠次)	Scouting pioneer	
25	1980	Carl XVI Gustaf of Sweden		Sweden
6	1980	Masayoshi Ōhira	Prime Minister	
7	1981	Yoshio Sakurauchi	President of the Scout Parliamentary Caucus	
17	1981	Chubee Kagita	General Commissioner of the Boy Scouts of Nippon	
18	1981	Jusaburō Kawai (河合 寿三郎)	Scouting pioneer	‡
26	1983	Ronald Reagan		United States
19	1983	Katsuji Yamaguchi (山口 勝治)	Scouting pioneer	‡
20	1985	Gen Hirose		
8	1985	Ken Harada	President of the Scout Parliamentary Caucus	
21	1985	Yōsuke Hirayama (平山 羊介)		
9	1986	Yasuhiro Nakasone	Prime Minister	
27	1987	László Nagy		Switzerland
22	1987	Sei Yagi (Yagi Kiyoshi (?)ハ木 清)		
23	1988	Masao Murata (村田 正雄)	General Commissioner of the Boy Scouts of Japan	
24	1988	Toshiwo Doko	President? (Sōsai)	‡
2	1989	Naruhito	Crown Prince of Japan	
25	1989	Masaru Ibuka		
26	1989	Yorihiro Matsudaira	International Commissioner	
27	1989	Muneyoshi Tokugawa		‡
28	1989	Lee Teng-hui		Republic of China
28	1990	Mitsuji Hama (浜 光治)		
29	1990	Sadaharu Hisamatsu (久松 定治)		
30	1990	Yoshio Hattori		‡
31	1991	Sōichirō Honda		
32	1991	Shōzō Takahashi (高橋 正蔵)		
33	1991	Tarō Matoba (的場 太郎)		
10	1991	Noboru Takeshita	Prime Minister	
29	1992	Prince Edward, Duke of Kent		United Kingdom
11	1992	Ryūtarō Hashimoto	Prime Minister	
34	1992	Ichirō Fujiyama		
35	1993	Yawara Hata		
36	1994	Shinpei Iwanami (岩波 信平)		
37	1994	Shintarō Negishi		
38	1995	Hiro Takiguchi (滝口 弘)	Scouting pioneer	
39	1995	Masao Takeda (竹田 正夫)	Scouting pioneer	
40	1997	Yoshishige Ashihara		
41	1997	Ryōmasa Suzuki (鈴木 了正, Norimasa or Ryōshō)	General Commissioner of the Boy Scouts of Nippon	
42	1997	Ayakazu Hirose		
12	1998	Keizō Obuchi	Prime Minister	
43	1999	Shōichi Saba	Chairman of the National Board of the Boy Scouts of Nippon	
30	1999	Park Kun-bae		Korea
13	2003	Yoshirō Mori	Prime Minister	
31	2005	Paras, Crown Prince of Nepal		Nepal
44	2008	Kō Yoshida	International Commissioner	
45	2010	Tsunao Hashimoto	Chairman of the National Board of the Boy Scouts of Nippon	
32	2011	Kang Young-joong	Korea Scout Association President March 7, 2008 - April 16, 2012	Korea
46	2014	Tadashi Sugihara (杉原 正)	Honorary Chairman	

== See also ==
- Bronze Wolf of World Scout Committee
- Silver Wolf of The Scout Association
- Silver Wolf of the Norwegian Guide and Scout Association
- Silver Wolf of Scouterna
- Silver Buffalo Award of the Boy Scouts of America
- Order of CúChulainn of Scouting Ireland
- Silver Fish
- Silver Kangaroo Award of Scouts Australia
