= Ichirō Terao =

- 寺尾一郎

Chairman of the National Board of Governors of the Boy Scouts of Japan

Ichirō Terao (寺尾一郎, Terao Ichirō) served as the Chairman of the National Board of Governors of the Boy Scouts of Japan.

== Background ==
In 1985, Terao was awarded the 174th Bronze Wolf, the only distinction of the World Organization of the Scout Movement, awarded by the World Scout Committee for exceptional services to world Scouting. In 1978 he also received the highest distinction of the Scout Association of Japan, the Golden Pheasant Award.
