= Tsunao Hashimoto =

- 橋本 綱夫
- Born: November 11, 1932
- Died: March 12, 2016 (aged 83)
- Occupation: Business executive
- Employer: Sony Corporation

Tsunao Hashimoto (橋本 綱夫, Hashimoto Tsunao), (11 November 1932 - 12 March 2016), vice chairman and representative director of the Sony Corporation, served as the 9th Chief Scout of the Scout Association of Japan, from April 1, 2006 to March 31, 2010.

== Background ==
In 1958, he graduated from University of Tokyo and joined Sony. In 1995, he became vice chairman of Sony. In 1998, he became chairman of Sony Life.

In 2010 he received the highest distinction of the Scout Association of Japan, the Golden Pheasant Award.

Hashimoto died of pneumonia on 12 March 2016 at the age of 83.

Preceded by Shōichi Saba	Chief Scout of the Scout Association of Japan; 2006–2010	Succeeded by Takayasu Okushima
