= Clarence Griffin (Scouting) =

Irish scout pioneer

- Born: 1873
- Died: 1951 (aged 77–78)
- Known for: Founder of the first Scout troop in Japan

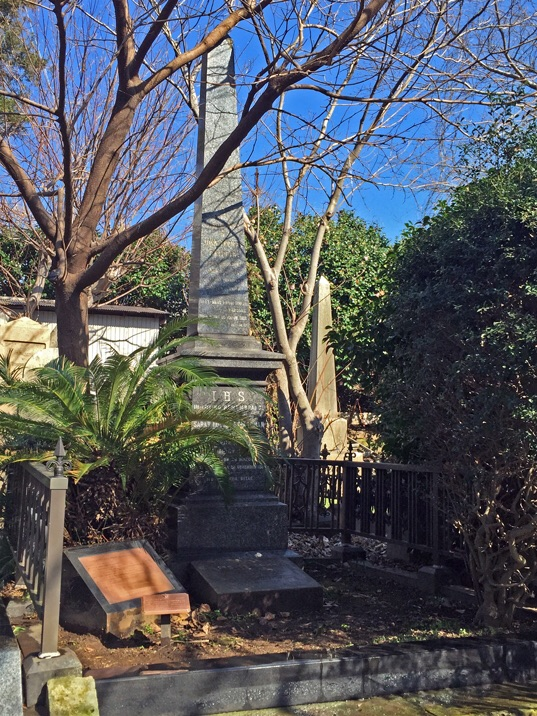
gravesite at Yokohama Foreign General Cemetery

Clarence Griffin (1873–1951) was the founder of the first Scout troop in Japan, in 1911.

== Background ==
Griffin was born in the north of Ireland in 1873 and was the only son of British parents. Soon after Clarence was born, John Thomas Griffin, Clarence's father, moved to Japan to begin business. Clarence remained in Northern Ireland with his mother, Sara Louise, until 1875 when the family reunited in Yokohama.

The Great Kantō earthquake of September 1, 1923 devastated Yokohama. Clarence Griffin was found barely breathing by surprised Scouts as they helped with rescue work in the aftermath of the destruction. Relocating to Kobe he recovered from his injuries however, being financially ruined by the quake, Griffin soon left Japan. After a short lecture tour in the United States Griffin taught for many years at a college in Taiwan and then spent the World War II years in Shanghai before returning to Yokohama in 1950.

After Griffin's death in 1951, the Boy Scouts of Japan (now the Scout Association of Japan) placed a marker on his grave at the Yokohama Foreign General Cemetery (Yokohama Gaikokujin Bochi) honoring him as Japan's first Scoutmaster.
