= Takayasu Okushima =

Japanese legal scholar (1939–2024)

- 奥島 孝康
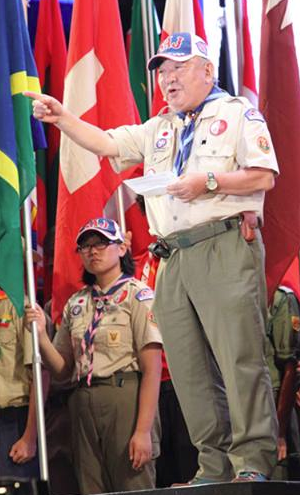
- Okushima in 2015

President of Hakuoh University
- In office April 2013 – 1 May 2024
- Preceded by: Mayumi Moriyama

Chief Scout of the Scouting Association of Japan
- In office April 2010 – 1 May 2024
- Preceded by: Tsunao Hashimoto

Personal details
- Born: 16 April 1939 Kihoku, Ehime, Japan
- Died: 1 May 2024 (aged 85) Tokyo, Japan
- Education: Waseda University

Takayasu Okushima (奥島 孝康, Okushima Takayasu; 16 April 1939 – 1 May 2024) was a Japanese law professor, President of Hakuoh University, President of Waseda University, the 10th Chief Scout of the Scout Association of Japan since 1 April 2010, and served as the Camp Chief of the 23rd World Scout Jamboree.

In addition, Okushima was the Japan High School Baseball Federation (JHBF) President and Japan Student Baseball Association (JSBA) Director, and served as Member at-large of the Baseball Federation of Japan.

Okushima died of pneumonia in Tokyo on 1 May 2024, at the age of 85.

Academic offices
Preceded by Chumaru Koyama	President of Waseda University; 1994–2002	Succeeded by Katsuhiko Shirai
Preceded by Yasuhiko Torii	President of the Japan Association of Private Universities and Colleges; 2001–2003	Succeeded by Yuichiro Anzai
Preceded by Mayumi Moriyama	Principal of Hakuoh University; 2013–2024	Succeeded by
Sporting positions
Preceded by Haruo Wakimura	President of the Japan High School Baseball Federation; 2008–2015	Succeeded by Eiji Hatta
Scouting
Preceded by Tsunao Hashimoto	Chief Scout of the Scout Association of Japan; 2010–2024	Succeeded by
