= Hiroshi Koshiba =

- Born: November 9, 1884. Tsuwano-chō, Shimane
- Died: June 19, 1925 (aged 40); Tokyo
- Known for: One of the founders of the Japanese Scouting movement

Koshiba Hiroshi (小柴 博; Tsuwano-chō, Shimane November 9, 1884 – June 19, 1925) was one of the founders of the Japanese Scouting movement.

He graduated from Tsuwano Elementary School. He entered Himeji Junior High School, a state school run by Hyogo Prefecture, but dropped out due to family reasons.

In 1903, he became a student at Shimane Normal School.

In 1905, he received a full Elementary School Teacher's licence, and became a teacher at Tsuwano Elementary School.

In 1907, he went to Tokyo, and worked at Akasaka Jinjo High School. Together with his colleagues, Hasunuma Monzō (蓮沼門三) and Iso Kikuma (磯規矩馬), he participated in the Shūyōdan (修養団) movement.

In 1909, he started the youth branch of the Shuyodan (修養団幼年会, Shūyōdan Yōnenkai). This group received support from, among others, Kurushima Takehiko (久留島武彦), Kishibe Fukuo (岸辺福雄) and Amano Kijihiko (天野雉彦), and held 61 meetings in six years, before being disbanded. It is reported that meetings consisted of events such as readings of children's stories and inspirational and improving stories, singing, excursions and group training, and were always extremely popular.

On October 7, 1913, Hasunuma Monzō and Uryū Kisaburō (瓜生喜三郎) had a discussion about youth education with Japan's ambassador to Russia Motono Ichirō (本野一郎), where Motono explained in detail about the Boy Scout principles and organization in Europe. They were greatly impressed, and told Koshiba how wonderful this organization was. Koshiba immediately set to work on forming a youth education group, founding the Tokyo Shōnengun (東京少年軍) ("Tokyo Youth Army"). This group's first excursion was to the temple known as Mejiro Fudōson (目黒不動尊) to visit the grave of Aoki Kon'yō (青木昆陽), and dig for imo potatoes.

In 1920, he participated in the First World Scout Jamboree in England, together with Shimoda Toyomatsu and Richard Suzuki.

On April 13, 1921, he reorganized the Shūyōdan Yōnenbu to form the Tokyo Shōnengun ("Tokyo Youth Army"). This was the first youth group based on the British Boy Scout training methods to be founded in Japan.

On June 19, 1925, he died in his Tokyo home of heart failure, aged 42.

== Sources ==
Much of this article was translated from the equivalent article in the Japanese Wikipedia, as referenced on October 27, 2006.
