= Hōjō Tokiyuki (Scouting) =

Japanese educator (1858–1929)

- 北条 時敬
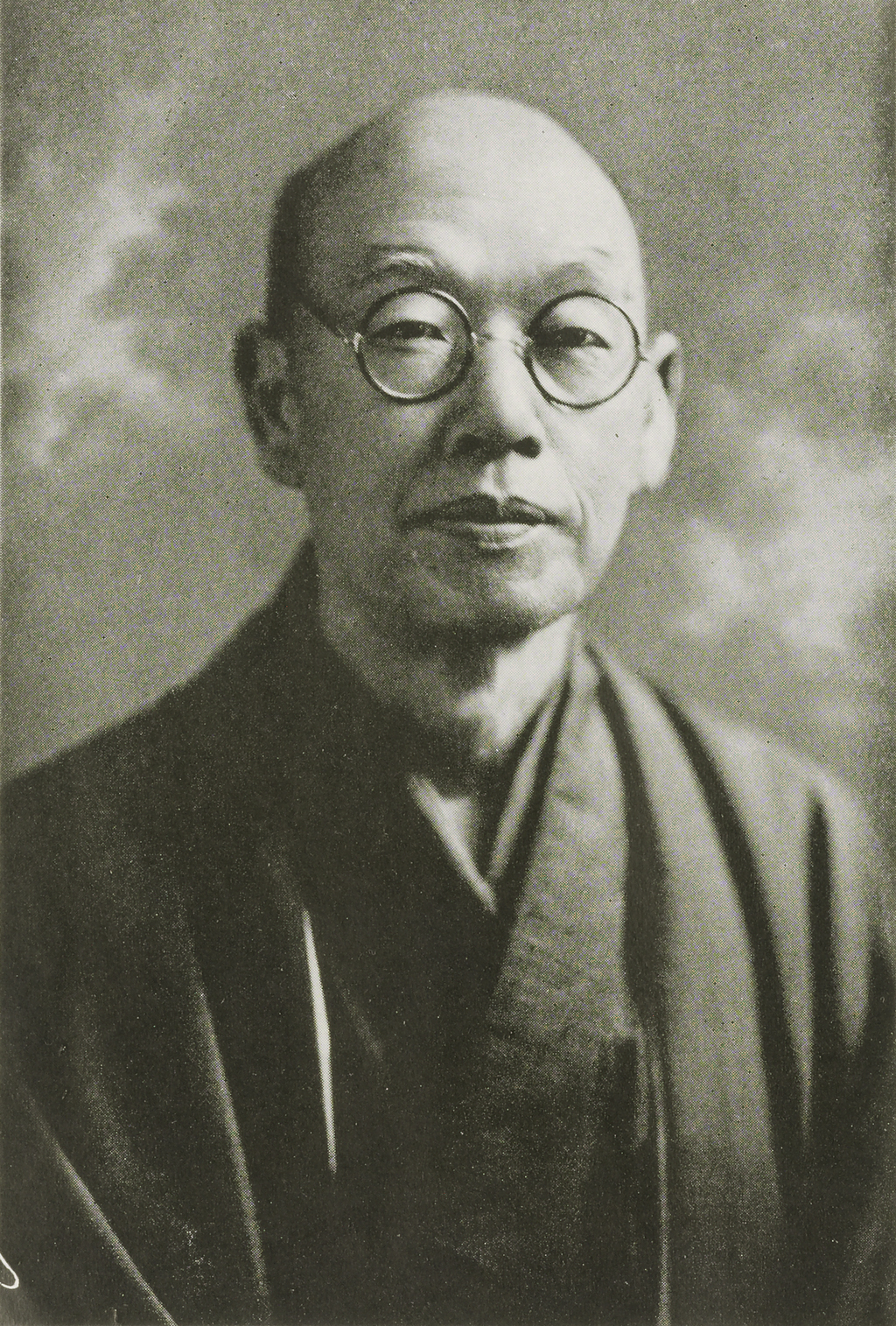

Member of the House of Peers
- In office 2 June 1920 – 27 April 1929 Nominated by the Emperor

Personal details
- Born: 23 March 1858 Kanazawa, Ishikawa, Japan
- Died: 27 April 1929 (aged 71)
- Party: Dowakai
- Education: Tokyo Imperial University
- Occupation: Politician, Educator

Hōjō Tokiyuki (北条 時敬; 23 March 1858 – 27 April 1929) was an educator, mathematician and politician in Meiji period Japan. He was the twelfth head of Gakushūin Peers’ School, and an early Japanese Scouting notable.

== Biography ==
Hōjō was born as the second son of a samurai retainer of the Maeda clan of Kanazawa Domain, (now Kanazawa City, Ishikawa Prefecture. His family claimed descent from the famous Hōjō family of Kamakura. His name as a child was Kumejirō (粂次郎).

In 1885, Hōjō graduated from the Mathematics Department, Science Faculty of Tokyo Imperial University. He was hired as a teacher at Ishikawa Prefectural Technical School in his home town of Kanazawa, but returned to Tokyo in 1888 to attend the graduate school of Tokyo Imperial University. In 1894, he became deputy principal of Yamaguchi High School in Yamaguchi Prefecture, becoming principal of the same school in 1896. However, in 1898, he was transferred to assume the job of principal of Ishikawa Prefecture Technical School, which had by that time been renamed the Fourth High School. He then transferred in 1902 to become first principal of Hiroshima Normal High School (now Hiroshima University).

In 1908, Hōjō attended an international conference on morality in London, England, at the request of Education Minister Makino Nobuaki. One of the reasons for his trip was to conduct a survey of the British Scouting organization, and its applicability towards furthering the Japanese government's program of instilling moral education in schools. He returned to Japan with scout uniforms and documents on Scouting, and took an active role in promoting the Japanese scouting movement in Hiroshima and elsewhere in Japan.

In 1913, Hōjō was appointed president of Tohoku Imperial University. He became chancellor of the Gakushūin Peers's School in 1917 and served until 1920.

in 1920, Hōjō became an advisor to the Imperial Court, and was appointed a member of the House of Peers of the Diet of Japan.

On 27 April 1929, he died of liver cancer, aged 71.

== Sources ==
Much of this article was translated from the equivalent article in the Japanese Wikipedia, as referenced on December 23, 2008.

Preceded by Sawayanagi Masataro	President of Tohoku Imperial University; 1913–1917	Succeeded by Fukuhara Ryōjirō
Preceded by Osako Naoharu	Chancellor of Gakushuin; 1917–1920	Succeeded by Ichinohe Hyoe
