= Scouting in Japan =

National occurrence of Scouting

The Scout and Guide movement in Japan is served by

- Girl Scouts of Japan, member of the World Association of Girl Guides and Girl Scouts
- Scout Association of Japan, member of the World Organization of the Scout Movement
- Baden-Powell Scouts Association-Japan
- International Boy Scouts, Troop 1

== International Scouting ==
There are two organizations focused on serving children of American military families living in Japan and elsewhere in Asia, the Girl Scouts of the USA, serviced by the USA Girl Scouts Overseas—West Pacific and the Boy Scouts of America, serviced by the Asia East District and Asia Central District of the Far East Council at Camp Zama. These councils serve BSA and GSUSA units of children of diplomatic, business and military personnel, and international units run under their auspices.

== See also ==
- Scouting in displaced persons camps
- Scouting in the Ryukyu Islands
