= Isamu Takeshita =

Japanese admiral

- 竹下 勇
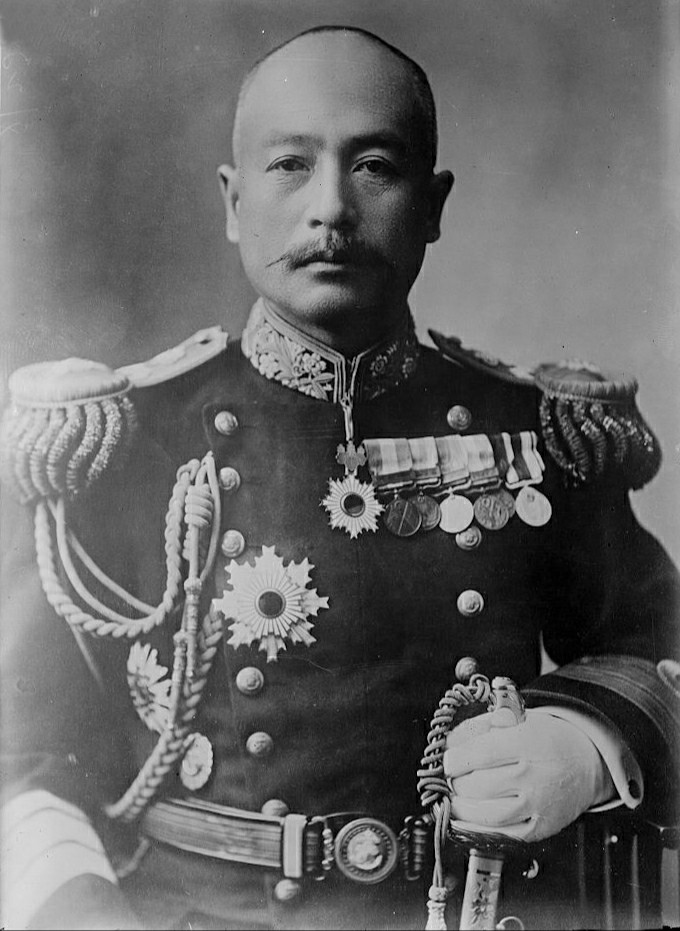
- Born: 5 January 1870; Kagoshima, Satsuma domain Japan
- Died: 1 July 1949 (aged 79); Tokyo, Japan
- Military career
- Allegiance: Empire of Japan
- Branch: Imperial Japanese Navy
- Service years: 1889–1929
- Rank: Admiral
- Conflicts: Russo-Japanese War; World War I
- Awards: Order of the Rising Sun (1st class)

Isamu Takeshita (竹下 勇, Takeshita Isamu; 5 January 1870 – 1 July 1949) was an admiral in the Imperial Japanese Navy. He was also a diplomat whose accomplishments included helping end the Russo-Japanese War favorably for Japan and obtaining former German possessions in the Pacific for Japan following World War I. In addition, he was a patron and practitioner of the Japanese martial arts, especially judo, sumo, and aikido.

== Early years ==
Born Yamamoto Jiro into a samurai class family in Kagoshima, Satsuma domain (present-day Kagoshima prefecture), he was adopted into the Takeshita family as a boy.

== Naval and diplomatic career ==
Takeshita entered the 15th class of the Imperial Japanese Naval Academy in 1892, and he graduated third in a class of eighty students. He entered naval service as a midshipman in 1889; his first ship was the armored corvette Kongo. In 1898, he attended the Japanese Naval War College, which had been founded that same year.

Because he was fluent in English, Takeshita was posted overseas at various times as a naval attaché. In October 1902, he was appointed Japan's naval attaché to the United States. In this role, Takeshita was an active participant in negotiations mediated by President Theodore Roosevelt that led to the Treaty of Portsmouth, ending the Russo-Japanese War. During 1904, he also helped Roosevelt obtain the services of judo teacher Yamashita Yoshitsugu, first for Roosevelt himself and then for the United States Naval Academy. Takeshita's commands included the cruisers Suma, Kasuga, Izumo, Tsukuba and the battleship Shikishima.

Takeshita was a member of the Japanese diplomatic mission to the United States in 1917, the Paris Peace Conference of 1919, and the League of Nations. In these positions, he played a leading role in Japan's obtaining former German holdings in the Central and Western Pacific. For these efforts, he was awarded the Order of the Rising Sun (1st class). Takeshita returned to Japan to accept a posting as commander-in-chief of the Combined Fleet on 1 December 1922, a position he held until January 1924. His subsequent billets included Commander of the Kure Naval District. He was placed on the retired list in November 1929.

== Activities after retirement ==
During late summer 1935, Takeshita made his fifth trip to the United States. His mission was to try to explain to American audiences that Japan's invasion of China in the Second Sino-Japanese War, was to stop the spread of Communism. As for Japan's relationship with the United States, Takeshita stated that "No Japanese warship has ever crossed the Pacific except on a mission of peace," he said during a radio broadcast in San Francisco. "No Japanese soldier has ever come to these shores except on a similar mission."

In February 1937, Takeshita was appointed head of the Japanese Boy Scouts, Sea Scouts, and YMCA. This was part of the general militarization of Japanese sports and athletics taking place at that time. Later that year, he was also approached about becoming the head of the Japanese Amateur Athletic Federation, but he declined this offer.

In May 1939, Takeshita became the third president of the Japan Sumo Association. He held this post until November 1945.

In April 1941, he became head of Japan's New Sword Society. This organization supported makers of modern Japanese swords that were handmade in the traditional fashion.

Takeshita died in Tokyo in July 1949. Coincidentally he made his home in the area of Takeshita Street in Shibuya, Tokyo. The Takeshita place name dates from the Edo era.

== Connection with aikido ==
=== Encounter with Morihei Ueshiba ===
Takeshita first heard of Morihei Ueshiba through his colleague at the Imperial Japanese Naval Academy, Admiral Seikyo Asano, who was studying Daito-ryu aiki jujutsu (the forerunner of aikido) under Ueshiba at Ayabe. In 1925, Takeshita went to Ayabe to see Ueshiba and was so impressed that he recommended Ueshiba to Yamamoto Gonnohyoe, a retired admiral and former Prime Minister of Japan. This recommendation caused Yamamoto to invite Ueshiba to Tokyo to provide demonstrations to the Japanese military and political elite. Ueshiba's stay was however interrupted by sickness and he had to return to his hometown of Tanabe.

In February 1927, Takeshita invited Ueshiba to Tokyo again, and this time, Ueshiba settled there. Takeshita's influence was such that many military officers, government officials and members of the wealthy class began practicing Ueshiba's martial art. Takeshita was not only an admirer but also an ardent practitioner of aikido, despite his age (he was almost 50). He filled notebooks with descriptions of Ueshiba's techniques, and these descriptions provide insights into the development of aikido.

=== Role in the promotion of aikido ===
In 1935, Takeshita gave a demonstration of Ueshiba's art at the first Nihon Kobudo Shinkokai (Society for the Promotion of Japanese Classical Martial Arts) demonstration. Later that same year, Takeshita gave public demonstrations of aikido in Seattle, Washington and Washington, D.C; this was the introduction of aikido to the United States.

In 1940, Takeshita was instrumental in providing a legal identity to Ueshiba's Kobukan organization by founding the Kobukai Foundation and becoming its first president. Also, in 1941, Takeshita used his influence to arrange a demonstration of aikido by Ueshiba at the Imperial Palace. The demonstration took place in front of the Imperial family. Although ill, Ueshiba gave a spectacular exhibition, which greatly impressed the nobility.

Military offices
Vacant; post last held by Yamaya Tanin	2nd Fleet; Chief-of-staff; 28 September 1907 – 17 December 1907	Succeeded by Arima Ryōkitsu
Preceded by Akiyama Saneyuki	1st Fleet; Chief of Staff; 1 December 1912 – 24 May 1913	Vacant; post next held by Satō Tetsutarō
Preceded by Tochinai Sojirō	1st Fleet; Commander-in-chief; 27 July 1922 – 27 January 1924	Succeeded by Suzuki Kantarō
Fleet recreated, last held by Tochinai Sojirō	Combined Fleet; Commander-in-chief; 22 December 1922 - 27 January 1924	Succeeded by Suzuki Kantarō
Preceded by Suzuki Kantarō	Kure Naval District; Commander-in-chief; 27 January 1924 – 15 April 1925	Succeeded by Abo Kiyokazu
Scouting
Preceded by Gotō Shinpei	Chief Scout of the Scout Association of Japan; 1937–1945	Succeeded by Mishima Michiharu
Sporting positions
Preceded by Hirose Masanori	Chairman of the Japan Sumo Association; 1939–1944	Succeeded by Tsunenohana Kan'ichi
