= Nippon Scout Jamboree =

Scouting Jamboree held by the Scout Association of Japan

Nippon Scout Jamboree 日本スカウトジャンボリ
- Genre: Scouting Jamboree
- Frequency: Every four years
- Country: Japan
- Inaugurated: September 24, 1949

The Nippon Scout Jamboree (日本スカウトジャンボリー, Nippon Sukauto Janborī) is a Scouting Jamboree held by the Scout Association of Japan, and is the largest Scouting event in Japan. "Scout" was added to the name beginning in 2018.

Jamborees are held once every four years, and are abbreviated as "NJ", or including the number of the event, as (for example) 14NJ for the 14th Nippon Jamboree.

The first postwar all-Japan camp held to celebrate the reorganization of the Boy Scouts of Japan was held September 24–25, 1949 in Tokyo. The second All-Japan Camporee was held from August 18–20, 1950. The third All-Japan Camporee was held from August 4–6, 1951. Beginning with the fourth All-Japan Camporee, the name was changed to Nippon Jamboree.

== Locations ==
- 1st Nippon Jamboree August 2 to August 6, 1956, Karuizawa, Nagano Prefecture
- 2nd Nippon Jamboree August 6 to August 10, 1959, Aibano, Shiga Prefecture
- 3rd Nippon Jamboree August 3 to August 8, 1962, Gotenba, Shizuoka Prefecture
- 4th Nippon Jamboree August 5 to August 9, 1966, Nihonbara, Okayama Prefecture
- 5th Nippon Jamboree August 6 to August 10, 1970, Asagiri Plateau, Shizuoka Prefecture
- 6th Nippon Jamboree August 1 to August 6, 1974, Chitosebara, Hokkaidō
- 7th Nippon Jamboree August 4 to August 8, 1978, Gotenba, Shizuoka Prefecture
- 8th Nippon Jamboree August 2 to August 6, 1982, Minami Zaō National Youth Campsite, Miyagi Prefecture
- 9th Nippon Jamboree August 2 to August 6, 1986, Minami Zaō National Youth Campsite, Miyagi Prefecture
- 10th Nippon Jamboree August 3 to August 7, 1990, Myōkō Plateau, Niigata Prefecture
- 11th Nippon Jamboree August 3 to August 7, 1994, Kuju Plateau, Ōita Prefecture
- 12th Nippon Jamboree August 3 to August 7, 1998, Foothills of Mount Moriyoshi, Akita Prefecture
- 13th Nippon Jamboree August 3 to August 7, 2002, Maishima Sports Island, Osaka Prefecture
- 14th Nippon Jamboree August 3 to August 7, 2006, Refresh Mura Hachigasaki, Suzu, Ishikawa Prefecture
- 15th Nippon Jamboree August 1 to August 8, 2010 Asagiri Plateau, Shizuoka Prefecture
- 16th Nippon Jamboree July 31 to August 7, 2013, Kirara Beach, Yamaguchi Prefecture, preparation for the 23rd World Scout Jamboree
- 17th Nippon Scout Jamboree August 4 to August 10, 2018, Refresh Mura Hachigasaki, Suzu, Ishikawa Prefecture
- 18th Nippon Scout Jamboree August 4 to August 10, 2022, 2 sites in Tokyo, one in Koto Ward, the other in Kawasaki

== Other camping festivals ==
=== Scout Moots ===
Rover Scouts and Scouts of the same age range can participate in these events. They are held once every four years.

- Rover Moot 97 August 26 to August 31, 1997, Uwano Plateau, Hyōgo Prefecture
- Moot 2001 August 7 to August 12, 2001, Shinshiro Yoshikawa Campsite, Aichi Prefecture
- Scout Moot 2005 August 19 to August 24, 2005, Yamanaka Campsite, Yamanashi Prefecture

=== Nippon Agoonorees ===
Participants in these events are mainly Scouts with disabilities. Agoonorees are held once every four years, and are abbreviated as "NA", or including the number of the event, as (for example) 9NA for the 9th Nippon Agoonoree.

- 1st Nippon Agoonoree: August 8 to August 20, 1973, Aichi Youth Park, Aichi Prefecture
- 2nd Nippon Agoonoree: July 30 to August 3, 1976, Aichi Youth Park, Aichi Prefecture
- 3rd Nippon Agoonoree: August 3 to August 8, 1979 Nagai Park, Osaka
- 4th Nippon Agoonoree: August 5 to August 9, 1983 Ureshinodai Lifelong Educational Center, Hyōgo Prefecture
- 5th Nippon Agoonoree: July 31 to August 4, 1987 Chuo Youth House, Gotenba, Shizuoka Prefecture
- 6th Nippon Agoonoree: July 25 to August 29, 1991 National Institution for Youth Education, Tokyo
- 7th Nippon Agoonoree: July 26 to July 30, 1995 National Myogo Youth Outdoor Learning Center, Niigata Prefecture
- 8th Nippon Agoonoree: August 5 to August 9, 1999, Outdoor Activity Center, Matsuyama, Ehime Prefecture
- 9th Nippon Agoonoree: July 31 to August 4, 2003, Refresh Town Hachi-ga-saki, Suzu, Ishikawa Prefecture
- 10th Nippon Agoonoree: July 31 to August 4, 2008 (It would have been held in 2007, but was moved to 2008 due to the World Scout Jamboree being held in 2007.) Happy Village, Kobe, Hyogo Prefecture
- 11th Nippon Agoonoree: August 2 to August 6, 2012, Kibogaoka Culture Park, Shiga Prefecture
- 12th Nippon Agoonoree: August 12 to August 16, 2016, Fuji Yamanomura, Fujimiya, Shizuoka Prefecture
- 13th Nippon Agoonoree: August, 2020 Fukushima Prefecture

=== Venture Scout Festivals ===
Participants in these events are mainly Scouts of high school age (Venture Scouts, formerly Senior Scouts). These festivals are held once every four years, and have currently been held six times. They are abbreviated as "NV", or including the number of the event, as (for example) 6NV for the 6th Nippon Venture.

- 1st Nippon Venture: July 27 to August 3, 1984, Foothills of Minami Zaō Range, Miyagi Prefecture
- 2nd Nippon Venture: July 29 to August 5, 1988, Asagiri Plateau, Shizuoka Prefecture
- 3rd Nippon Venture: August 3 to August 11, 1992, Aibano, Shiga Prefecture
- 4th Nippon Venture: July 29 to August 4, 1996, Foothills of Mount Sanbe, Shimane Prefecture
- 5th Nippon Venture: July 29 to August 4, 2000, Kusumi Plateau, Oita Prefecture
- 6th Nippon Venture: August 2 to August 7, 2004, across the Kantō region

== See also ==
- Jamboree (Scouting)
- World Jamboree

== Sources ==
Much of this article was translated from the original article in the Japanese Wikipedia, as retrieved on October 27, 2006.
