= Kurushima Takehiko =

- 久留島 武彦
- Born: June 19, 1874; Mori Town, Kusu District (currently Kusu Town) in Ōita Prefecture
- Died: June 27, 1960 (aged 86)
- Education: Ōita Middle School
- Alma mater: Kwansei Gakuin University
- Relatives: Kurushima Michifusa, Kurushima Michiyasu
- Writing career
- Genre: Children's literature
- Notable work: Yūyake Koyake

Kurushima Takehiko (久留島 武彦; June 19, 1874 – June 27, 1960) was a children's literature author known as "the Japanese Hans Christian Andersen". He was one of the three great Japanese authors of children's stories for public performance. One of Takehiko's most celebrated works is the nursery rhyme "Yūyake Koyake".

== Life and career ==
Takehiko was born in 1874 in Mori Town, Kusu District (currently Kusu Town) in Ōita Prefecture. He was a direct descendant of Kurushima Michifusa (来島 通総), and the grandson of the last head of the Mori Domain, Kurushima Michiyasu (久留島 通靖).

In 1887, he entered Ōita Middle School (currently Ōita Uenogaoka High School 大分県立大分上野丘高等学校). There he met an American priest, Wainwright, who was working as an English teacher. Partly due to the influence of Mr. and Mrs. Wainwright, Takehiko came to enjoy telling stories to children in Sunday School. Both Takehiko and Wainwright transferred to Kwansei Gakuin University (関西学院), from which Takehiko eventually graduated. Upon his graduation, Takehiko entered the army and served in the First Sino-Japanese War. During this time, works which he had submitted under the pen name Onoe Shinbee (尾上 新兵衛) were accepted by Iwaya Sazanami (巌谷 小波), the head writer at the magazine Shōnen Sekai (少年世界), "'World' for Boys". Takehiko then began to write military stories. During this time, Takehiko also met Ozaki Kōyō.

After returning to Japan, Takehiko got a job working for the Kobe Shimbun newspaper. In 1906, he began his tour of Japan, during which he gave readings of children's stories at over 6000 kindergartens and elementary schools. After his tour, in 1910, Takehiko founded Sawarabi Kindergarten.

In 1924, Takehiko and Iwaya Sazanami became consultants to the recently established Japanese Children's Story Guild (日本童話連盟, Nihon Dōwa Renmei). In 1924, Takehiko also played a part in laying the foundations of the Scouting movement in Japan. A group including Takehiko, Nakano Chūhachi (中野 忠八), and Takehiko's son-in-law, Kurushima Hidesaburō (久留島 秀三郎) participated in the Second World Scout Jamboree held in Denmark, as the deputy leader of the Japanese group. During this time, Takehiko visited Odense, the birthplace of Hans Christian Andersen. Upon his arrival, Takehiko became distressed to find that the house in which Andersen was born was now being used as little more than a storehouse, and that Andersen's grave was unattended to and had gone to seed. Takehiko appealed to the local newspaper, and to anybody else he visited, asking them to return Andersen to his rightful prominence. Moved by his concern, the Danish people came to call Takehiko “the Japanese Hans Christian Andersen”.

At that time, when he visited Odense, the birthplace of Hans Christian Andersen, he was distressed to find that the house in which Andersen was born was being used as little more than a storehouse, and that Andersen's grave was unattended to and had gone to seed. He appealed to the local newspaper, and to wherever else he visited, to return Andersen to his rightful prominence. Moved by this, the Danish people came to call him "the Japanese Hans Christian Andersen".

In 1945, both Takehiko's Tokyo home and Sawarabi Kindergarten were burnt down during air raids, consequently, in 1949, Takehiko moved to Kōseki-An (香積庵), a house built inside the precinct of Denkōji (傳香寺) temple.

== Related items ==
- The Kurushima Takehiko Culture Prize: a prize given to an individual or group for contributions to children's literature by the Japanese Culture Center for Youths and Children
- The Children's Story Plaque: in Mishima Park, Kusu, Oita Prefecture. Erected in 1950 to commemorate 50 years of Kurushima Takehiko's life in children's stories. A Japanese Children's Story Festival is held every year on May 5.
- Kurushima Takehiko Memorial Hall: also in Mishima park, Mori District, Oita Prefecture.
- Plaque marking the site of the home of Kurushima Takehiko: in the grounds of Denkō-ji, Nara, Nara Prefecture

== Sources ==
Much of this article was translated from the equivalent article in the Japanese Wikipedia, as referenced on October 22, 2006.
