= Scouting in the Ryukyu Islands =

Ryukyu Islands Girl Scouts

Ryukyu Islands Boy Scouts membership badge, which was designed by artist Shinzan Yamada

The Scout and Guide movement in the Ryukyu Islands is served by

- Girl Scouts of Japan, member of the World Association of Girl Guides and Girl Scouts
- Scout Association of Japan, member of the World Organization of the Scout Movement

Until the May 14, 1972 Ryukyu reversion to Japan, Scouting was served by

- Ryukyu Islands Girl Scouts, (RIGS, 琉球ガールスカウト) under the auspices of the Girl Scouts of the USA from August 31, 1954, to 1972.
- Ryukyu Islands Boy Scouts, (RIBS, later Boy Scouts of America—Ryukyu Islands/BSARI, 琉球ボーイスカウト) under the auspices of the Boy Scouts of America from February 6, 1955, to June 18, 1972, when 5138 Scouts of BSARI became members of Boy Scouts of Nippon.

== International Scouting ==
There are two organizations focused on serving children of American military families living in the Ryukyu Islands and elsewhere in Asia, the Girl Scouts of the USA, serviced by the USA Girl Scouts Overseas—West Pacific and the Boy Scouts of America, serviced by the Great Okinawa District of the Far East Council. These councils serve BSA and GSUSA units of children of diplomatic, business and military personnel, and international units run under their auspices.

== See also ==
- Scouting in Japan
