= Toyomatsu Shimoda =

Toyomatsu Shimoda (下田豊松, Shimoda Toyomatsu) (1887 - October 10, 1972), born in Iwanai District, Hokkaidō, helped to establish what became the Scout Association of Japan. He was Japan's first Chief Scout.

== Background ==
His father, Shimoda Nisaburō (下田仁三郎), participated in the "Kigyōsha" (起業社) organization from the Kanezawa han, which developed land to make it suitable for habitation. After graduating from Hakodate Commercial High School (函館商業高等学校, Hakodate Shōgyō Kōtō Gakkō), he worked as an army officer.

== Scouting ==
In 1914, during the fall season training of the Army Seventh Division, he was asked by Lieutenant General Utsunomiya Tarō (宇都宮太郎), to set up a youth organization and in 1916, he founded the Hokkaido Iwanai Youth Organization (北海道岩内少年団, Hokkaidō Iwanai Shōnendan).

In 1920, from July 30 to August 7, he participated in the first World Scout Jamboree, held in London. The other participants from Japan were Koshiba Hiroshi and Richard Suzuki. He also met Sir Robert Baden-Powell.

After returning from the jamboree, he established the Nihon Kenjidan (日本健児団) ("Japan Stalwart Youth Troop") in 1921, and worked as Japan's first Chief Scout, using his own home as the organization's office.

In 1928, while climbing the Niseko mountain range, he discovered a beautiful marsh area. Moved by its beauty, he named it Shinsennuma (神仙沼), meaning "a marsh where gods and sennin live."

== Legacy ==
In 1964, the Japanese Scout Association awarded him the title of Senior Scout (先達, sendatsu). The Shimoda Toyomatsu Memorial Hall, Kutchan, Abuta District, Hokkaidō is named in his honor.

== Related books ==
- The tale of Shimoda Toyomatsu - the unnamed first Chief Scout (下田豊松物語 - 無名の初代チーフスカウト, Shimoda Toyomatsu Monogatari - Mumei no Shodai Chief Scout) (Kuniichi Komachi, Kuni Scouting Library)

New title	Chief Scout of the Scout Association of Japan; 1924-1929	Succeeded by Gotō Shimpei
