= 13th World Scout Jamboree =

Scouting event

Coordinates: 35°22′40″N 138°35′09″E

- Official badge
- Location: Asagiri Heights, Mount Fuji, Fujinomiya City
- Country: Japan
- Date: August 2, 1971 to August 10, 1971
- Attendance: 23,758 Scouts
Previous; 12th World Scout Jamboree	Next; 14th World Scout Jamboree

The 13th World Scout Jamboree (第13回世界スカウトジャンボリー, dai-jūsan-kai sekai sukauto jamborii) was held from August 2 to 10, 1971, on Asagiri Heights on the western side of Mount Fuji, in Fujinomiya, Japan, approximately 80 miles southwest of Tokyo.

The Jamboree was interrupted by Typhoon Olive in which 16,000 of the participating Scouts were evacuated to shelters in the countryside for 48 hours. Mainly the American contingent. Most all other nationals experienced the typhoon.

The Jamboree site was served from the south by Japan National Highway 139 and a turnpike from Fujinomiya. Arriving Scouts were met at the Haneda International Airport in Tokyo and transported by coach to the Jamboree site, or to the Olympic Village in Tokyo as an intermediate stop. British troops arrived earlier and were treated to Japanese home stays. After the Jamboree and Typhoon experience, British contingents toured Japan for a few more days.

The American contingent, (numbering c.3,000), was divided up. A code was given to the troops. Some might be JKT, which meant Jamboree, Kyoto, then Tokyo, before returning to the United States. Some others might tour Tokyo, then go to the Jamboree, then tour Kyoto.

The site itself covered an area of grassy sandbank of about 4 km^{2}, sloping gently from east to west. The Jamboree Camp headquarters, Subcamp #11 Chūō, in the center of the site, was roughly rectangular in shape.

Medical facilities at the Jamboree were operated by the United States Army and Air Force. Other facilities at the Jamboree were a Skill-o-Rama and Exhibits service center and a large Trading Post.

In the opening days of the jamboree the Scouts played a 'wide game' in which each Scout was given a hiragana on a colored card worn around the neck. At a signal the Scouts would fan out over the jamboree site looking for the other characters which would spell out the jamboree theme, 'For Understanding'—no two character cards could be the same color. The Scouts who accomplished this feat then proceeded to a station to have their cards validated with a stamp.
