= Asagiri Plateau =

Plateau in Fujinomiya, Shizuoka, Japan

Coordinates: 35°24′48″N 138°35′28″E

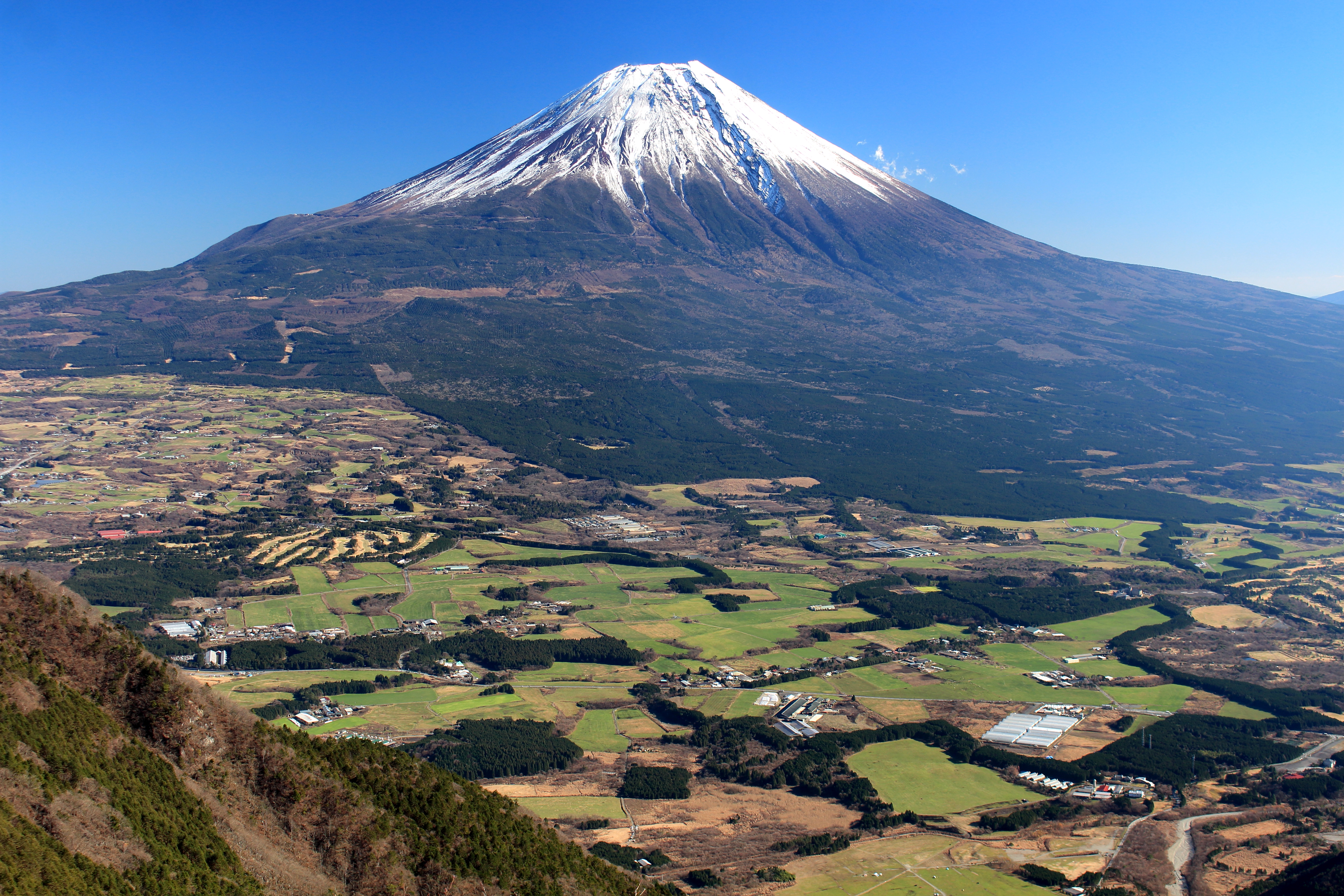
The Asagiri Plateau with Mount Fuji in the background, viewed from Mount Kenashi

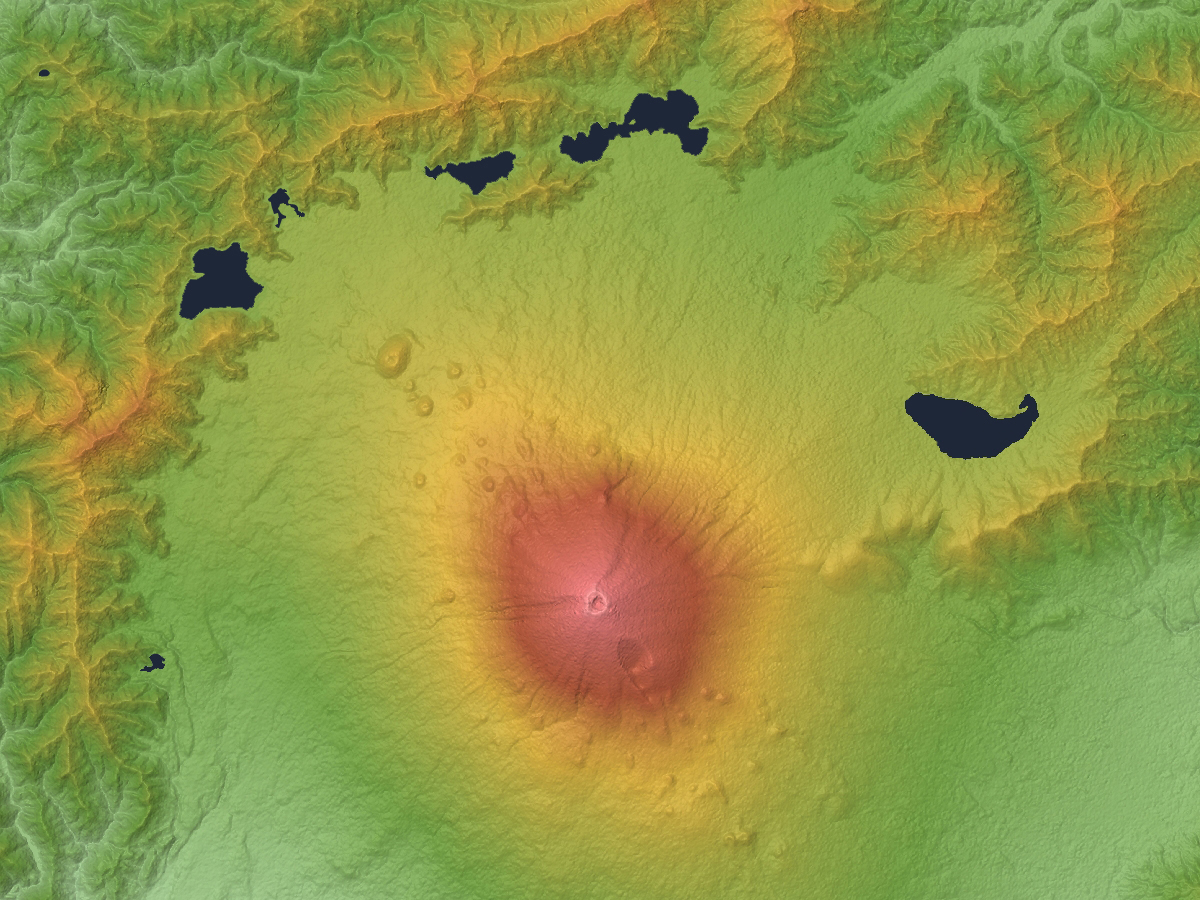
Mount Fuji and Asagiri Plateau

The Asagiri Plateau (朝霧高原, Asagiri Kōgen) is located at the southwest base of Mount Fuji in Fujinomiya, Shizuoka Prefecture, Japan. The Asagiri Plateau is richly utilized for its pastureland and many dairy farms are situated along it. The elevation of the plateau is generally around 800 m (2,625 ft) or 900 m (2,953 ft).

Asagiri Kogen is also home to one of the most spectacular Hang-gliding and Paragliding sites in Japan. With the backdrop of Fuji-san providing breathtaking photo opportunities, the site is extremely popular with both international and Japanese pilots alike.

== Climate ==
The summer climate is regarded as cool and comfortable, though the weather often changes. Fog can cover the plateau quickly, which gave rise to its name, which means "foggy morning."

The winter climate tends to be very cold.

== See also ==
- 13th World Scout Jamboree
