= Ebbe Lieberath =

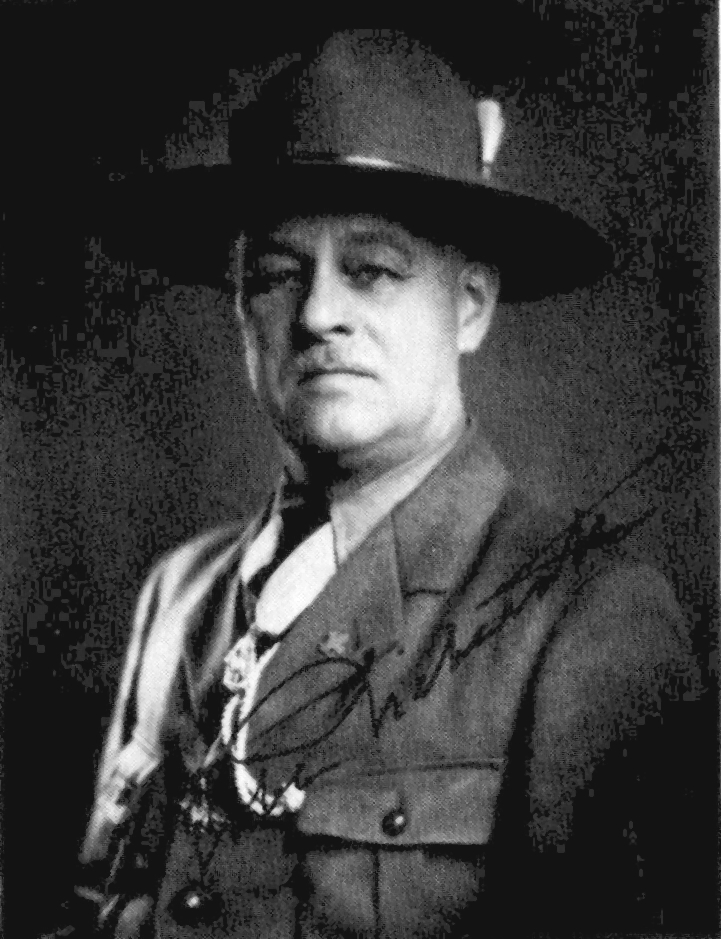
- Relatives: Allan Evers
- Military career
- Allegiance: Swedish
- Other work: Writer and pioneer of Swedish Scouting

Ebbe Harald Lieberath (25 June 1871 in Malmö - 1 November 1937 in Stockholm) was a Swedish military officer, writer and pioneer of Swedish Scouting.

== Background ==
Lieberath was a physical education teacher in Gothenburg when he found a copy of Scouting for Boys by Robert Baden-Powell during a boat trip. There are divided opinions about how Lieberath came in contact with the book. One version claims that it lay on a table in the lounge on board. Lieberath sat down and started to read the book and was thus inspired to try Scouting in Sweden. The second version claims that he had been sleeping on the boat and the book fell into his lap. Lieberath translated Scouting for Boys to Swedish in 1909.

He formed the first organized Scout group in Sweden which was Riddarpojkarna in Gothenburg. At the same time Lieberath started a magazine of the Swedish Scout Movement. The magazine survived only six months. Thanks to his translation of the book and personal boosting, Scouting ideas spread in Sweden. Lieberath co-founded the Swedish Guide and Scout Association in the Crown Prince Hotel in Stockholm in 1912. The union was not the first Scout association in Sweden. The YMCA's Scout association was first. The union was the first organization of free association. Lieberath was Scouting director of the Swedish Guide and Scout Association for many years. In 1920 he was awarded the first Silver Wolf Award, Swedish Scouting's highest award.

Lieberath wrote thirty books for young people, such as Klämmiga pojkar (Spirited Boys) (1924).

Ebbe Lieberathsgatan, neighbourhood in Gothenburg, was named after Lieberath in 1946. Lieberath spent his childhood in the district.

His nephew, Allan Evers (13 years old at the time), received the Gold Cross award in January 1915, for having saved people from drowning three times at the risk of his own life. The Gold Cross award is the Scout Movement's finest award.
