= Emil Winqvist =

Emil Winqvist is considered the founder of Scouting and Guiding in Sweden, in 1908. He was Chief Scout of the YMCA Scout Association from 1911 to 1917.

== See also ==
- Scouting in Sweden
