= Turpie =

Turpie is a surname. Notable people with the surname include:

- Craig Turpie
- David Turpie (1828–1909), American politician
- Harry Turpie (1875–1945), Scottish-American professional golf player
- Ian Turpie (1943–2012), Australian actor
- Jonnie Turpie, British film producer
- Stuart Turpie 1948–2015, British basketball player.

== See also ==
- Turpie Rock, a rock formation of Antarctica
