= Dan Ownby =

World Scout Committee member

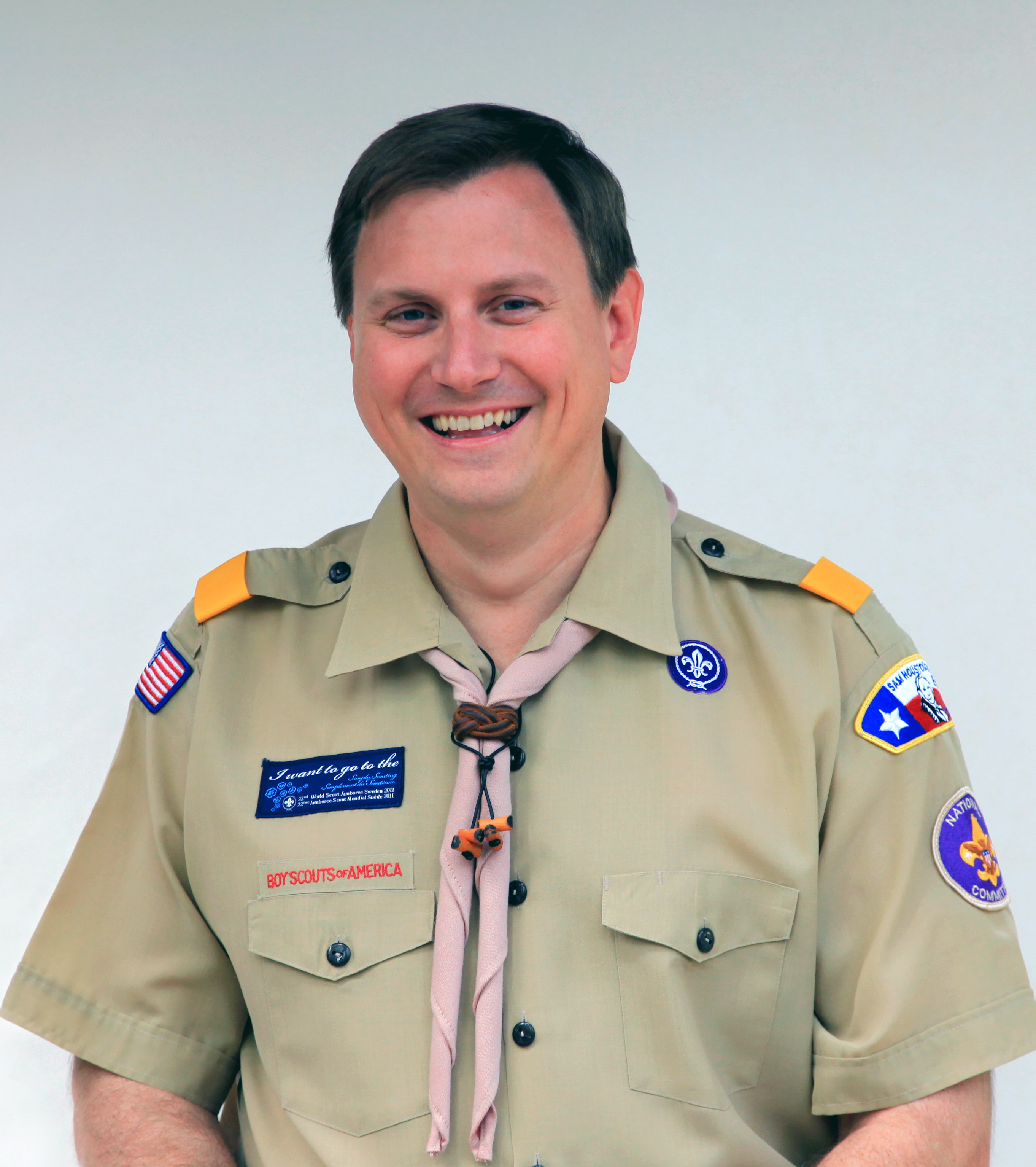

39th National Chair of the Boy Scouts of America
- In office 2019–2023
- Preceded by: Jim Turley
- Succeeded by: Brad Tilden

Personal details
- Born: Daniel Gil Ownby; December 2, 1968 Houston, Texas, US

Daniel Gil Ownby (born December 2, 1968) is an American energy professional. In 2020, Ownby was elected to a two-year term as National Chair for the Boy Scouts of America, the highest volunteer position in the Scout Organization. Previously, he served as International Commissioner for the Boy Scouts of America. He also was a member of the Executive Committee of the Boy Scouts of America and headed the United States Fund for International Scouting (USFIS). He is known as an advocate for youth leadership and a life-long volunteer with the Boy Scouts of America.

== Early life and education ==
Ownby graduated from Edison High School in Tulsa, Oklahoma in 1987 and in 1991 he received a Bachelor of Science degree in Marketing from Oklahoma State, where he was a member of the Phi Gamma Delta fraternity.

== Career ==
His professional career includes multiple roles in the energy industry and he currently serves as President of West Shore Pipe Line Company.

== Scouting ==
Ownby, a lifelong member of the Scout program, is a Distinguished Eagle Scout, a Vigil Honor member of the Order of the Arrow, he is Wood Badge trained and is a recipient of the Silver Buffalo Award. He has also been awarded the Silver Beaver, as well as several International awards, he was 2019 awarded the Gustaf Adolfs-märket, an award given by Scouterna (Sweden).

.In 2019, Dan was awarded the 370th Bronze Wolf, the only distinction of the World Organization of the Scout Movement, awarded by the World Scout Committee for exceptional services to World Scouting.

He served two terms (2011-2017) as one of 12 elected volunteer members of the World Scout Committee., the main executive body of the World Organization of the Scout Movement (first term as chairman of the Finance Committee and second term as Vice Chairman). During his terms, Ownby led the development of the Human Rights Task Force and was twice a member of the Secretary General Search Committee. It was here that Ownby introduced a greater sense of management and accountability in the areas of finance, governance, human resources, and reporting to the World Scout Committee and the World Scout Bureau at large.

Over the years, Ownby has been a supporter of the global profile of the Movement and has gone above and beyond to bring improvements to the educational aspects of International Scouting.

He has also served as a committee member of the Kandersteg International Scout Centre, located in Kandersteg, Switzerland. He is a World Scout Foundation BP Fellow, Life Member of Kandersteg International Scout Centre and Member of the Order of the Condor.

He was the host committee chairman for the Interamerican Regional Scout Conference held in Houston in 2016 and he serves as the BSA Contingent Leader for up to 10,000 USA scouts and scouters to the 24th World Scout Jamboree which takes place in 2019 at the Bechtel Summit Reserve in West Virginia. Dan has been on the organizing or planning team for the last four World Scout Jamborees, serving as the deputy camp chief at the 23rd World Scout Jamboree in 2015 in Yamaguchi, Japan.

In 2013, with the support of National Scouting Organizations in Central America, Ownby organized the pilot Interamerican Leadership Training (ILT), where 67 young people from nearly all National Scouting Organizations in the Region, attended a youth-led Leadership Training Course. The result enabled young people to be leaders in their Scout Organization and in the InterAmerican Region as well as to organize and lead Messenger of Peace projects which have involved thousands of Scouts all over the world. ILT is now in its seventh successful year.

For his tireless work for youth development in the US and abroad Ownby was presented, in 2016, the Youth of the Americas Award by the InterAmerican Scouting Region, and in 2019, the World Organization of the Scout Movement honored him with the Bronze Wolf Award, the highest recognition in World Scouting, of which less than 400 have been awarded since 1935.

Ownby has demonstrated his passion for Scouting at all levels, from being an Assistant Scoutmaster, COPE director, Philmont Ranger for 3 years, and Philmont Training Center Faculty member. He chaired the Philmont International Seminar in 2009.

In the Houston area, Ownby has served as a board member of the Sam Houston Area Council since 2005, he served as chairman of the council's centennial camporee SHACJAM (which was attended by over 27,000 participants), and in 2004 served as a Wood Badge Course Director.

== Personal ==
Dan is the grandson of former Houston school board Chairwoman and City Councilwoman Eleanor Tinsley. In 2000, he married Allison (Rinden). They met while Allison finished her doctorate in Philosophy/Political Science at Rice University. They reside in Houston, Texas.

In 2017 Dan and Allison Ownby served as the unofficial "Mom and "Dad" to twelve youth representing the Boy Scouts of America in Washington D.C. to deliver the Report to the Nation. During the trip the Ownbys offered mentorship to the Scouts.

"We got to see some of the top world leaders," Ownby said. "But for us, we're with some of the top leaders of the future. And that's what's great. For us, it was getting to meet each one of the Scouts and spending time with them that was rewarding."

== Awards and Recognitions ==
1984 - Eagle Scout, Boy Scouts of America

1999 - Vigil Honor, Order of the Arrow

2000 - Silver Beaver Award, Sam Houston Area Council

2016 - Outstanding Eagle Award, National Eagle Scout Association

2016 - Youth of the Americas Award, InterAmerican Scout Region

2017 - Silver Buffalo Award, Boy Scouts of America

2019 - Bronze Wolf Award #370, World Organization of the Scout Movement

More than 10 International Scouting Awards from various countries.
