= Silver World Award =

International-level service award of Scouting America

- Silver World medal and square knot
- Owner: Scouting America
- Country: United States
- Created: 1971
- Awarded for: Distinguished service to the world’s youth
- Recipients: 138 (2025)
Previous; Silver Buffalo Award	Next; Bronze Wolf Award

The Silver World Award is a distinguished service award of Scouting America. It is presented for noteworthy and extraordinary service to youth on an international basis. Recipients must be a citizen of a country with a member of the World Organization of the Scout Movement. Registered members of Scouting America are not eligible for this award.

== Award ==
The award consists of a silver medallion enameled in blue with meridian lines, stars and the universal emblem of Scouting America suspended from a red and white striped ribbon worn around the neck. The medallion represents the global scope of the award.

Recipients may wear the corresponding square knot, with a design that reflects the award.

== History ==
The Silver World Award was created in 1971 and originally was presented to those who provided international service to the programs of Scouting America, but were not registered members of the organization.

Nominations were to be approved by the Chief Scout Executive, the national president, the international commissioner, or the national commissioner, all of whom had the authority to present to any persons they might choose.

== Criterion ==
Today, public nominations for the award are no longer accepted, but it is used by the executive leadership of Scouting America for recognition of world leaders in International Scouting, on the following basis and procedure:

The award may be presented to citizens of any country whose Scout association is a member of the World Organization of the Scout Movement, in recognition of their service of exceptional character to the youth of their own country, or on an international basis. The recipient does not have to be a member of a Scout association. United States citizens may receive the Silver World Award for international service to youth, provided they are not registered members of Scouting America.

Approved awards may be presented by an authorized member of Scouting America either by a personal visit with the recipient or at an official meeting of a national Scout association.

As evidence of the award, a certificate, suitable for framing, duly authorized by Scouting America is presented.

== Recipients ==
As of May 2021, there have been 126 Silver World Awardees. Note: This list is presented in the order of awards as published by the Scouting America International Department.

- 1971— Charles Dymoke Green, Jr. (United Kingdom); László Nagy (Switzerland); John W. Sharp (Canada); Olave Baden-Powell (United Kingdom)
- 1972— Taizō Ishizaka (Japan); Saburō Matsukata (Japan); Tsunao Okumura (Japan); Antonio C. Delgado (Philippines); Charles Celier (France); E. Bower Carty (Canada) A. Wallace Denny (Canada); Misael Pastrana Borrero (Columbia); Adolfo Aristeguieta G. (Venezuela); Ramon Ocando Perez (Venezuela); Julio Montes Taracena (Guatemala); Samuel Hart (Jamaica); Nahim Isaias B. (Ecuador); Sir Paul Hasluck (Australia); Sir John Marshall (New Zealand); Sri Sultan Hamengku Buwono IX (Indonesia); Mohammad Reza Pahlavi Aryamehr Shahanshan of Iran (Iran); Golda Meir (Israel)
- 1973— Salvador Fernández Beltrán (Switzerland); Bruce H. Garnsey (Australia); Jomo Kenyatta (Kenya); Haile Selassie I (Ethiopia); Demetrios Alexantos (Greece); Oscar de Oliveira (Brazil)
- 1974— Victor Steiner (El Salvador); Dr. Gustavo J. Vollmer (Venezuela); Luis Esteban Palacios W. (Venezuela); Johan Kromann (Denmark); Robin Gold (United Kingdom); Arthur Eugster (Switzerland); Lakshmi Mazumdar (India); Pope Paul VI (Vatican)
- 1975— Chuan-kai Teng (Taiwan); Shintarō Negishi (Japan); Odd Hopp (Norway); Sven H. Bauer (Sweden); Hossein Banai (Iran); The Princess Benedikte (Denmark); Emperor Hirohito (Japan); King Olav V (Norway)
- 1976— King Carl XVI Gustaf (Sweden); Sherman K. Ramsingh (Trinidad and Tobago); Jorge Toral Azuela (Mexico); Sir William Gladstone, Bt., DL (United Kingdom); Shieh You-Hwa (Taiwan)
- 1977— Spencer W. Kimball (United States); Francisco Macías Valadéz (Mexico)
- 1978— John Beresford (United Kingdom); Roberto Dorion B. (Guatemala); Kenneth H. Stevens (United Kingdom)
- 1979— Col. Sang Myong Ree (Korea); J. Percy Ross (Canada)
- 1980— Ivo Stern Becka (Mexico); Wallace B. Smith (United States)
- 1981— Daniel Arap Moi (Kenya); Leonard F. Jarrett (Switzerland); Bennett B. Shotade (Africa Region World Organization of the Scout Movement (WOSM))
- 1982— Alexander Gibson (Bahamas); John R. Phillpot (Bahamas); Percival R. Siebold (World Scout Bureau); Yoshio Sakurauchi (Japan)
- 1983— Pope John Paul II, (Vatican); Tan Sri Kamarul Ariffin (Malaysia)
- 1984— Archbishop Iakovos of America (United States); Jarl Wahlström (Finland); Enrique Alfaro (Mexico); Rolando Gonzalez (Venezuela); Rudolgo Kantor (Chile); Reginald K. Groome, OC (Canada)
- 1985— John L. MacGregor (Canada)
- 1986— Antonio Pozzi Pardo (Mexico); Kō Yoshida (Japan); Patrick A. McLaughlin (Switzerland)
- 1987— Peter Pessoa (Brazil); Suk-Won Kim (Korea)
- 1988— Fritz Vollmar (Switzerland); James Blain (Canada)
- 1989— Franz Dunshirn (Austria); Morrey Cross (Canada)
- 1990— Juan Neiman (Guatemala); Sir Marc Noble (United Kingdom)
- 1991— F. O. Ogunlana (World Scout Committee, Nigeria)
- 1992— Herbert C. Pitts (Canada); Hartmut Keyler (Germany); Sven Erik Ragnar (Sweden); Garnet de la Hunt (South Africa)
- 1993— Jacques Moreillon (Switzerland)
- 1995— Garth Morrison (United Kingdom)
- 1996— Neil M. Westaway (Australia)
- 1997— Geoffrey W. Wheatley (Canada); Aleksander Kwasniewski of Poland; Ezer Weizman (Israel)
- 1998— Ryutaro Hashimoto; Carlos Enrique Rivera (Guatemala); President Mary McAleese of Ireland; Francisco Roman (Philippines)
- 1999— Joseph Estrada (Philippines); Klaus Johann Jacobs (Switzerland)
- 2001— Akira Watanabe (Japan)
- 2003— Jørgen G. Rasmussen (Denmark)
- 2004— John A. Gemmill (Canada); Howard E. Kilroy (Ireland)
- 2007— Lars Kolind (Denmark); Alexander S. Bondar (Ukraine); Emperor Akihito
- 2008— John Geoghegan (World Scout Foundation, Ireland); Göran Hägerdal (Sweden)
- 2010— Mohamed Ali Khalid (Asia Pacific Region WOSM, India)
- 2011— Simon Hang-Bock Rhee (Korea)
- 2012— Luc Panissod (Switzerland); Jejomar Binay of the Philippines; Abdullah Rasheed (Maldives)
- 2015— Siegfried Weiser, World Scout Foundation
- 2018— João Armando Gonçalves (Portugal); Jemima N. Nartey (Vice Chairperson, World Organization of the Scout Movement)
- 2019—Ahmad Alhendawi (Secretary-General of the World Organization of the Scout Movement)
- 2021— Michael (Mike) D. Scott (Canada); Omar Lugo Aguirre (Mexico)
