= Gustaf Adolfs-märket =

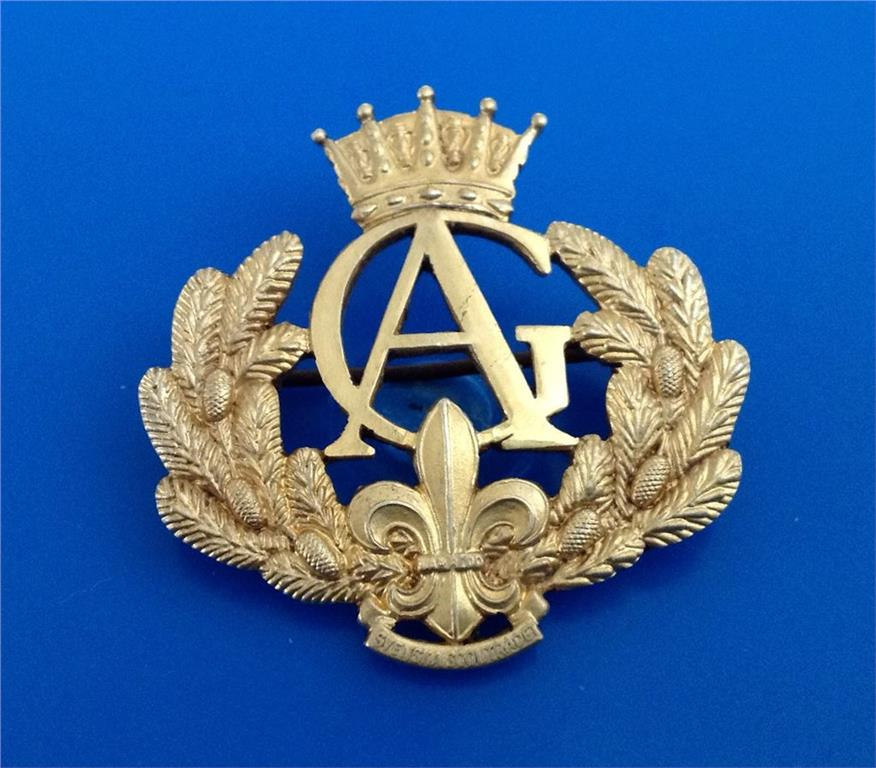
- Owner: Scouterna
- Created: 1947
- Awarded for: Particular meritorious service to Scouting and Guiding in Sweden

The Gustaf Adolfs-märket is, after the Silvervargen (Silver Wolf), the highest award in Scouterna (the Swedish Scout movement). It has been awarded by Swedish Scouting since 1947.

== Background ==
The Gustaf Adolfs-märket was created in 1947 in memory of Prince Gustaf Adolf, the prince was heavily involved in the scout movement and from 1930 to his death 1947 chairman of the Swedish Scout Union. Today, the award is awarded to "active leaders for particularly meritorious contributions to the Swedish Scout movement at least at district level.

The principles for the medal were in 1947 drawn up by the Prince's widow Princess Sibylla.

The Gustav Adolf medal consists of Prince Gustaf Adolf's crowned name cipher in a granite wreath with the Scout lily, executed in gilded silver.

Notable recipients include Folke Bernadotte, Princess Sibylla, King Carl XVI Gustaf, Luc Panissod, Bertil Tunje, Dan Ownby, Göran Hägerdal, Craig Turpie, John C. C. May and Stephen Peck.
