= John Philpot (disambiguation) =

John Philpot (1516–1557) was a martyr.

John Philpot or Phillpot may also refer to:

- John Philpot (MP) (died 1384) for City of London
- John R. Phillpot International Commissioner of the Scout Association of the Bahamas

== See also ==
- John Philipot (1588–1645) officer of arms
