= Reginald K. Groome =

Reginald K. Groome O.C. (December 18, 1927 - September 20, 1999), a native Montrealer, was known for his contributions to: the hotel and hospitality industries, the Scouting movement, and community service. At the time of his passing, he was chairman of the Board of Governors of Concordia University, Governor and Director of the Montreal General Hospital Center and Foundation, Director of the World Scout Foundation, Chairman of the World Scout Foundation in Canada, and Chairman of Scouts Canada Trust, chairman of the Board of Groome Capital.Com and a Director of the Voyageur Insurance Company.

Among his many past community service accomplishments, Groome was a noted radio broadcaster for 51 years from 1946 to 1997, with both CJAD and CFCF Montreal radio stations. He was President of the Boy Scouts of Canada, President of The Montreal Board of Trade, Chairman of The United Way / Centraide Campaign, Warden of the St. George's Anglican Church, Governor of La Chambre de Commerce du Québec, President of The Montreal Convention and Tourism Bureau, Director of the Quebec Society for the Defence of Animals, and Director of the Palais de la Civilization.

Groome was perhaps best known for his career as a hotel executive. He started as a bellman at the Mount Royal Hotel in 1956, prior to becoming Personnel Manager at The Queen Elizabeth Hotel in 1957, where he hired and trained all their employees, in advance of the hotel's opening. A series of promotions led Groome to become General Manager of The Queen Elizabeth Hotel, then to chairman and President of Hilton Canada Inc, and Vice-president Development for Hilton International Inc, and finally, to Chairman of The Hotel Association of Canada. After retiring from Hilton in 1990 with 33 years of service, Groome continued in the hotel industry as Special Advisor to the President of Canadian Pacific Hotels and Resorts for another 5 years.

Among his many corporate board memberships, Groome served on the board of directors of The Arctic Group Inc, Mpact Immedia Corporation (which became BCE Emergis Technologies Inc. in 1999), Transat A.T. Inc, Industrial Alliance Life Insurance Company, General Trust Corporation of Canada, United States Fire Insurance Company, Crum and Forster Canada Ltd, Crum and Forster United States, Westchester Fire Insurance Company, The North River Insurance Company, International Insurance Company, Herald Insurance Company, Assured Assistance Inc, and Dustbane Enterprises Inc. Groome was also Chairman of the Urbanism Committee for the Parish of Saint Sauveur, Quebec.

== Awards ==
Awards received by Groome for his past services to business and the community include the following:

- In Scouting: The Silver Acorn in 1964, The Silver Wolf in 1978, The Baden Powell Fellow Award in 1982 from the World Scout Foundation, The Silver World Award in 1984 from The Boy Scouts of America, and The Bronze Wolf in 1996 from The World Scout Organization, presented to him by the King of Sweden.
- For Community Service: The Outstanding Citizen Award in 1976 from the City of Montreal, The Queen's Jubilee Medal in 1977, The Inaugural Canadian B'Nai B'Rith Award of Merit in 1978, Officer of The Order of Canada in 1980, Meritorious Citizen Award in 1980 from the province of Quebec, The Canada 125 Medal in 1992, and The United Way / Centraide Canada Award of Excellence in 1992.
- In Business: Named a Fellow of the Canadian Hospitality Institute in 1981, awarded a gold medal and honorary diploma by the Quebec Government in 1983 for Hotel and Restaurant Achievement and Tourism, McGill University Management Achievement in 1984, and Hotelier of the Year Award in 1990 from the province of Quebec Hotel Association.
