= Sven Erik Ragnar =

CEO of Götabanken

Sven Erik Ragnar of Alingsås, Sweden (1937 - 19 October 2007)

Sven Erik was 1963 employed by the Skandinaviska Banken in Stockholm. Sven Erik was later CEO of Götabanken and after that CEO of Reinholds AB.

Sven Erik had a keen interest in Scouting and served as the secretary/treasurer of the Helenelund Scout Center Foundation, as well as chairman, treasurer and member of the board of the World Scout Foundation.

In 1993, Ragnar was awarded the 231st Bronze Wolf, the only distinction of the World Organization of the Scout Movement, awarded by the World Scout Committee for exceptional services to world Scouting.

During the World Scout Conference in Tunisia in 2005, Sven Erik was awarded the Silver Wolf, Sweden's highest Scout award.
