= Craig Turpie =

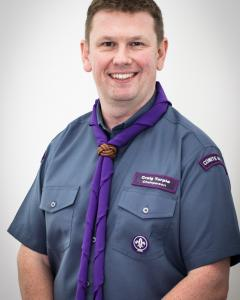
- Born: 17 December 1974 (age 51)
- Known for: Chairman of the World Scout Committee

Craig Turpie of Stirling, Scotland, served as chairman of the World Scout Committee, the main executive body of the World Organization of the Scout Movement from 2017 to 2021. Since then, Craig has served as the Deputy UK Chief Commissioner for Transformation. In 2022, he was awarded the Bronze Wolf Award for his contributions to world scouting.

== Scouting in the UK ==
Craig Turpie first got involved in Scouting by joining his local Cub Scout Pack, 1st Stirlingshire Scouts, in 1983 and followed the youth programme through, achieving both his Queen's Scout Award and Explorer Belt. He became Assistant Area Commissioner for Venture Scouts in Edinburgh, and later the first Area Scout Network Commissioner for Edinburgh. It was at this point that Turpie first became involved with the work of the organisation's Scottish Headquarters and UK Headquarters in a number of different roles.

Turpie was a member of The Scout Association's International Team between 2001 and 2007. He rejoined that team in 2013 for a brief stint as Deputy International Commissioner.

Turpie was appointed UK Commissioner for Programme on 1 April 2014. He held the role until elected chair of the World Scout Committee in 2017.

Then UK Chief Commissioner Wayne Bulpitt, who appointed Turpie to the programme role, said "I'm delighted that Craig has joined our UK leadership team. We'll benefit from his extensive experience and talents as we further develop our youth programme and the support given to leaders delivering it, both of which we know are key to our continued success."

In 2019 Craig was awarded the Gustaf Adolfs-märket, an award given by Scouterna (Sweden).

=== Roles in the United Kingdom ===
- 1993–1994: Chairperson, Scottish Venture Scout Council (Scottish Headquarters)
- 1993–1994: Member, Scottish Board (Scottish Headquarters)
- 1993–1994: Member, Finance and General Purposes (Scottish Headquarters)
- 1993–1994: Member, National Venture Scout Advisory Board (UK Headquarters)
- 1994–1998: Member, 18-25 Working Group (UK Headquarters)
- 1995–2001: Assistant Venture Scout Leader (Edinburgh)
- 1997–1998: National Communications Manager, Scout Network (UK Headquarters)
- 2000–2004: Chairperson, UK-Poland Network
- 2001–2007: Member, International Team (UK Headquarters)
- 2001–2007: Area Scout Network Commissioner (Edinburgh)
- 2002–2003: UK Contingent Leader, Roverway 2003, Portugal
- 2012–2013 Chairperson, Governance Working Group (Scottish Headquarters)
- 2013–2014 Deputy International Commissioner (UK Headquarters)
- 2014–2017 UK Commissioner for Programme (UK Headquarters)
- 2021–Present Deputy UK Chief Commissioner for Transformation (UK Headquarters)

== European Scout Committee ==
Turpie served as a member of the European Scout Committee from 2004 to 2007 and as Chairperson of the European Scout Committee for two terms from 2007 to 2013. In this role Turpie was also an ex-officio Member of the World Scout Committee.

=== Roles at a European Level ===
- 2004–2007: Coordinator, Adult Resources Core Group
- 2004–2007: Member, European Scout Committee (co-opted)
- 2007–2010: Chairperson, European Scout Committee
- 2010–2013: Chairperson, European Scout Committee

== World Scout Committee ==
Turpie was an ex-officio member of the World Scout Committee during his time as chair of the European Scout Committee from 2007 to 2013.

He was elected Chairman of the World Scout Committee at the World Scout Conference 2017 in Baku, Azerbaijan.

=== Roles at an International Level ===
- 2004–2005: 9th World Scout Youth Forum Planning Team
- 2004–2007: Youth Advisor, World Scout Committee
- 2005–2007: Member, Educational Methods Committee
- 2005–2007: Member, Adult Volunteer Task Team
- 2005–2008: Member, 2007 Task Force
- 2007–2010: Member, Budget Committee
- 2007–2013: Member, World Scout Committee (ex-officio)
- 2011–2013: Member, Membership Task Force
- 2011–2013: Member, Global Support Team
- 2014–2017: Member, Innovating Scouting Workstream
- 2016: Member, Secretary General Search and Selection Task Force
- 2014–2017: Chairperson, 2nd World Scout Education Congress Planning Team
- 2014–2017: Chairperson, Strategy Monitoring Group
- 2014–2017: Member, World Scout Committee
- 2017–2021: Chairman, World Scout Committee

== Personal life ==
Turpie was born in Stirling, Scotland, in 1974. He studied graphic design at the University of Edinburgh and then a master's degree in Design from 1996 to 1997, specialising in new media looking at visual communication through new technologies.

Turpie married his wife Cheryl in 2000. The pair met through Scouting. The couple have three children; Iain (2003), Sam (2005), and Ben (2009).

== Business ==
Turpie has since co-founded a number of spin-off digital businesses with interests in digital marketing, social media and health and well-being.

World Organization of the Scout Movement
Preceded by João Armando Gonçalves	Chairman, World Scout Committee; 2017-2021	Succeeded by Edward Andrew “Andy” Chapman
