= Tunje =

Tunje may refer to:

- Tunjë
- Bertil Tunje
- the Arabic name for Russian Bank, a card game
