= Bertil Tunje =

Bertil Tunje (born 1941) from Borås Sweden, was the vice-chairman of the World Scout Committee, the main executive body of the World Organization of the Scout Movement. He joined as a member of the World Scout Committee 1985 and was elected as Vice-chairman 1990 and served as that until 1996. He was a member of the Steering Committee of the World Scout Committee 1985 to 1996. Tunje served as a member of the WOSM/WAGGGS Consultative Committee 1985–1995, World Programme Committee 1985–1990. He was the chairman of the Educational Methods Group 1990-1996 and he was the chairman Strategy Task Force 1996–1999.

Tunje joined the scout troop Borås IV Kolonn/Sjömarkens Sjöscoutkår in 1948. He has hold several position in Swedish scouting, he was a member of the board of Svenska Scoutförbundet 1969–1972, 1977-1984 (vice chairman. 1981–1984) and he was a member of the board of the Swedish Scout Council 1977-1987 and was International Commissioner for Swedish Scouting 1978–1987.

Tunje was a participant in the 9th World Scout Jamboree, also known as the Jubilee Jamboree in England 1957. Tunje has in total participated in 11 World Scout Jamborees.

In 1996 Tunje served as the World Scout Committees contact person for the World Scout Moot in Sweden.

Tunje was in 1979 awarded the Swedish Gustav Adolfs-märket, in 1983 was he awarded the Swedish Silver Wolf Award (number 119) the highest award in Swedish scouting, and In 1996, was Tunje he awarded the 255th Bronze Wolf, the only distinction of the World Organization of the Scout Movement, awarded by the World Scout Committee for exceptional services to World Scouting.
