= Hugo Cedergren =

Swedish youth leader (1891–1971)

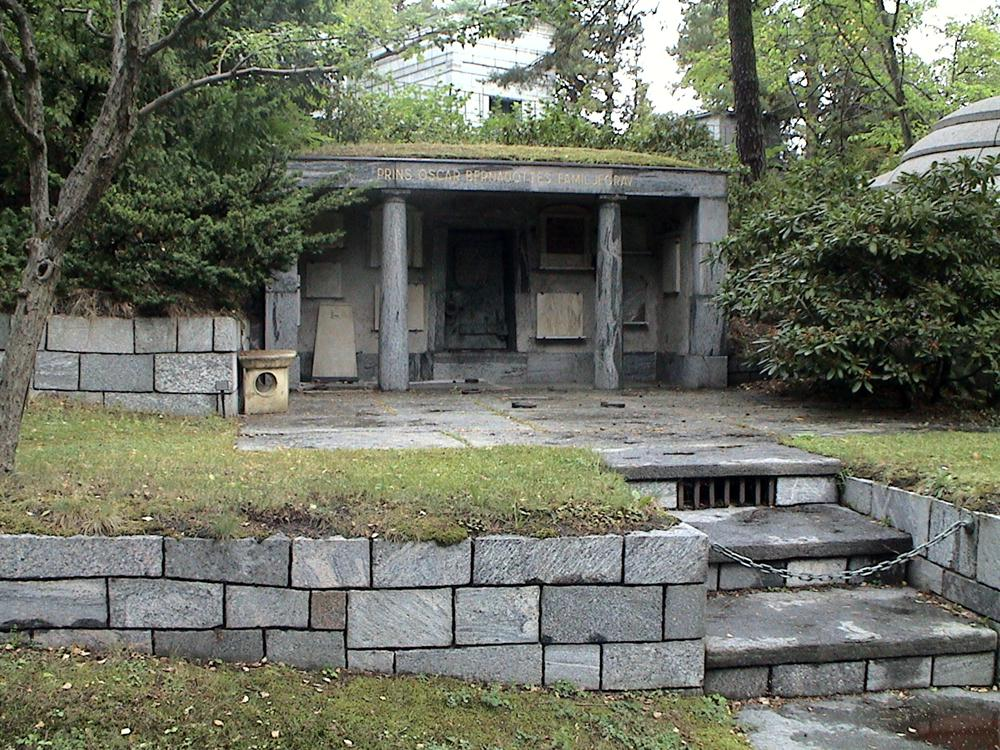
- Bernadotte family grave
- Born: 1891
- Died: 1971 (aged 79–80)
- Occupation: Scouting executive
- Known for: Ran the KFUK-KFUMs Scoutförbund YMCA Scout Association from 1934 to 1945

Carl Axel Hugo Cedergren (1891-1971) was an early Swedish Scouting executive, who ran the KFUK-KFUMs Scoutförbund YMCA Scout Association from 1934 to 1945.

Cedergren married Countess Elsa Victoria Bernadotte of Wisborg in 1929. The Cedergrens are buried in the Bernadotte family grave at the North Cemetery in Stockholm. At 102 years, 11 months and 14 days, Mrs. sv:Elsa Cedergren (1893–1996) is to date the second oldest member of the Bernadotte family.

In 1935, Cedergren was awarded the 12th Silver Wolf, the highest commendation of Swedish Scouting.
