= Bengt Junker =

- Born: 21 June 1913
- Died: 18 February 1970 (aged 56)
- Known for: Scouting notable

Bengt Junker (21 June 1913 – 18 February 1970 Stockholm) was a Swedish Scouting notable, head of the Sveriges Scoutförbund from 1951 to 1956 and from 1958 to 1966. In 1951 he succeeded Lennart Bernadotte, and in 1958 he succeeded Gösta Lewenhaupt. He was the last Scout manager of Sveriges Scoutförbund, and became the first chairman of the Svenska Scoutförbundet, formed by the merger of the Sveriges Scoutförbund and the Sveriges Flickors Scoutförbund. Junker was also instrumental in the start of the Swedish Scout Association's college sv:Kjesäters Folkhögskola, when in 1960 Vingåker Municipality sold Kesätters Castle to Sveriges Scoutförbund.

He was a 1949 recipient of the Silver Wolf, the highest commendation in Swedish Scouting.
