= John May (youth worker) =

British youth worker (born 1964)

John May CVO OBE DL
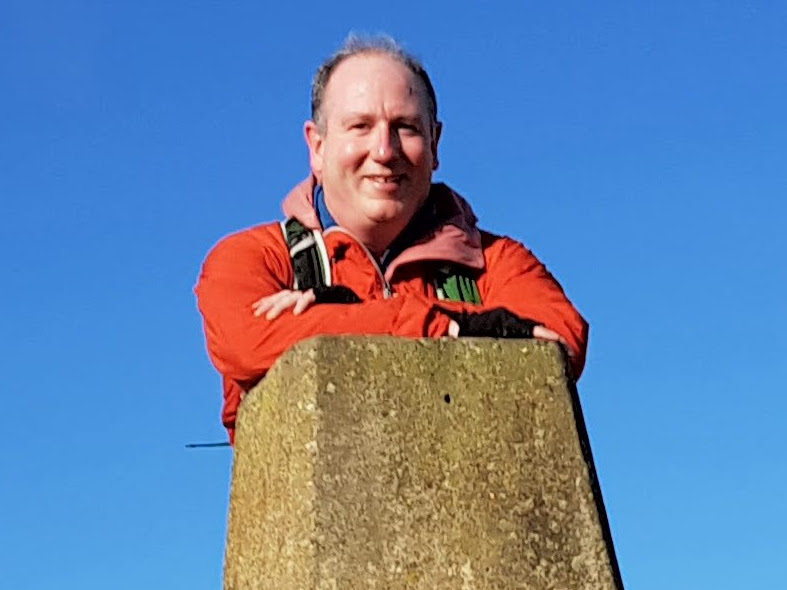
- Other name: John May
- Education: M.A. (Education), P.G.C.E., B.A. (Joint Honours), Drama and English
- Organization(s): World Scout Committee, Duke of Edinburgh's Award
- Known for: Vice-Chairman of the World Scout Committee, Secretary General of The Duke of Edinburgh's Award International Association
- Board member of: Teach First
- Awards: The Queen’s Award for Enterprise Promotion, 2008 The Silver Wolf Award, The Scout Association The Bronze Wolf Award, World Organisation of the Scout Movement

John Clive Cecil May CVO OBE DL (born 1964) is a British youth worker. He was born in the United Kingdom, and was educated at Beaudesert Park School and Wycliffe College, in Gloucestershire. He pursued higher education at Bristol University, where he achieved a Joint Honours degree in Drama and English, and then at Westminster College, Oxford, where he was awarded a postgraduate certificate in education.

== Professional career ==
=== Teaching ===
From 1986 to 1998, May taught in Staffordshire, West Sussex and Buckinghamshire, eventually becoming Headteacher of Manor Farm School in High Wycombe. In the early part of his career, May was achieved a master's degree in education from the Open University. During this time, he worked on a number of business education partnerships, culminating in his school being awarded the National Schools Curriculum Award in recognition of community links.

=== Business in the Community ===
May left teaching in 1998 to become the Director of Education and Community Campaigns at Business in the Community, where he ran Partners in Leadership, a mentoring programme for headteachers in partnership with the National College of School Leadership; Time to Read, a national scheme to encourage employee volunteers to support literacy in primary schools; and commissioned the work to create the educational charity Teach First, becoming one of its founding directors and trustees.

=== Career Ready / Career Academies UK ===
In 2002, May took on the role of founding CEO of the charity Career Academies UK, now known as Career Ready. Career Ready aims to bridge the gap between education and the workplace by providing young people with the skills, confidence, and networks needed to succeed in their careers. The charity partners with schools and colleges to offer a structured program of mentoring, masterclasses, workplace visits, and internships. During his tenure, the charity grew from working with an initial three schools to managing a network of more than 150 schools throughout the United Kingdom.

In 2008, May was honoured by being one of nine people nationally to receive The Queen's Award for Enterprise Promotion, a prestigious UK honour that recognises individuals who have made outstanding contributions to promoting enterprise skills and encouraging entrepreneurial attitudes. The award celebrates those who have demonstrated a sustained commitment to fostering business acumen and enterprise in others, often through education, mentoring, and support services

=== Young Enterprise / Junior Achievement ===
May joined Young Enterprise as its CEO in 2008, leading its work on equipping young people with the practical skills, knowledge, and confidence to succeed in the world of work and business. The charity's efforts focus on empowering young individuals from diverse backgrounds to achieve their full potential and make a positive impact on their communities and the economy. May worked with the boards of the charity’s ten autonomous regional charities in England and Wales, many facing unsustainable budgets, to merge into one single national charity. He rebranded and relaunched the charity, re-establishing it as a business-led (rather than public sector dependent) organisation, eventually gaining ‘model nation status’ for the charity within the Junior Achievement global family of organisations, of which Young Enterprise is a member.

=== The Duke of Edinburgh’s International Award ===
May moved on to take on the role of Secretary General of The Duke of Edinburgh’s International Award in 2011. He was responsible for overseeing the implementation and expansion of the Award across more than 130 countries, ensuring its principles and standards were upheld worldwide – and oversaw a growth in global participation from 750,000 to more than 1.3 million. He was particularly active in building relationships with education ministries in individual countries, using work he commissioned from PwC on the value of non-formal education and learning to put youth work at the heart of national education strategies. During the global COVID pandemic he worked with the United Nations and the World Health Organization to create opportunities for young Award participants to contribute to their communities. Through the Commonwealth Secretariat and at the Commonwealth Heads of Government Meeting in Kigali, Rwanda in 2011, May led discussions with delegations about the importance on non-formal education and learning.

=== Cats Protection ===
May's passion for charitable work also extends to animal welfare. He became Chief Executive of the UK’s leading feline welfare charity, Cats Protection, in 2022. This shift in sector leadership highlights May’s diverse interests and commitment to making a positive impact in various sectors. As Chief Executive, May has led the charity’s strategic planning and governance, helping the organisation to enhance its services and advocacy efforts for the well-being of cats across the country.

== Voluntary Career ==
=== Scouting ===
May is widely recognised for his extensive involvement as a volunteer in the Scout movement. His journey with the Scouts began in his youth with the Stroud Valley and Wycliffe College Scout Groups and evolved into various leadership roles, including International Commissioner of The Scout Association in the UK. In this role, May was instrumental in modernising the organization's approach to international youth engagement, focusing on inclusivity, diversity, and preparing young people with essential life skills. He served as a trustee of The Scout Association, chairing its programme and development committee, and was a member of the organizing committee of the 21st World Scout Jamboree in the United Kingdom in 2007. May was awarded The Scout Association’s Silver Wolf (the highest adult honour in UK Scouting) in 2015. He became Honorary President of British Scouting Overseas in 2017 and continues to support local Scouting in his home county of Oxfordshire.

His contributions extended internationally through his work with the World Organization of the Scout Movement (WOSM), promoting global citizenship and cross-cultural understanding. He was elected to the World Scout Committee in 2008 and served as Vice Chair of the World Scout Committee from 2011 – 2014. In 2014 May was awarded the Gustaf Adolfs-märket, an award given by Scouterna (Sweden). He was awarded The Bronze Wolf, World Scouting’s highest honour, in 2016.

=== Breakout Children's Holidays ===
With a group of former volunteers with the holiday organisation Colony Holidays (predecessor to ATE Superweeks), May founded Breakout Children’s Holidays in 1988 – a charity providing summer breaks for children in the West Midlands. Its aim was to provide a week or so of stability and normality for those for whom a holiday was a necessity.

=== The Marine Society & Sea Cadets ===
The Marine Society & Sea Cadets, a national youth charity offering nautical adventure and training, has also benefited from May's leadership as a trustee, where he served from 2015 until 2024. His role in the organisation underscores his dedication to youth development through maritime experiences. By supporting the Sea Cadets, May has helped provide young people with opportunities to develop nautical skills, leadership qualities, and a sense of discipline and community service.

=== Charity Mentors ===
Since 2017, May has volunteered for the organisation Charity Mentors, providing leaders of the voluntary sector with effective mentoring and support to facilitate strategic thinking and skilful leadership.

=== Oxfordshire Youth ===
In 2023, May became Chair of Trustees of Oxfordshire Youth, a charity supporting youth work across the county through a network of local youth organisations.The charity’s vision is for all young people to be empowered, feel respected and know that they are valued. They achieve this with, and through, their local network of youth sector organisations, together reaching more than 26,000 young people.

=== Civic Appointments ===
May was appointed a Deputy Lieutenant of Oxfordshire in 2017. In the United Kingdom, a Deputy Lieutenant is a Crown appointment and one of several deputies to the lord-lieutenant of a lieutenancy area. Deputy Lieutenants are appointed by the Lord-Lieutenant and come from all walks of life, from across their County. They come from all walks of life and serve until attaining the age of 75. Deputy Lieutenants assist the Lord-Lieutenant in carrying out their role as The King's representative.

He was appointed High Sheriff of Oxfordshire for 2025/26.

== Honours and Awards ==
- HM The Queen’s Award for Enterprise Promotion, 2008
- Freedom of the City of London, 2009
- Appointed Deputy Lieutenant of Oxfordshire (DL), 2018
- Appointed Officer of the Order of the British Empire (OBE) for services to young people in the 2020 New Year Honours
- Honorary Doctorate, University of Bolton, 2021
- Leadership Fellow, St George’s House, Windsor Castle, 2021
- Appointed Commander of the Royal Victorian Order (CVO) in the 2025 New Year Honours
