= Asociación de Scouts de Guatemala =

National Scouting organization of Guatemala

- Headquarters: Boulevard Rafael Landívar 2-01, Zone 15, Guatemala City
- Country: Guatemala
- Founded: 1920
- Membership: 6,020
- Affiliation: World Organization of the Scout Movement
- Website https://www.scouts.org.gt

The Asociación de Scouts de Guatemala is the national Scouting organization of Guatemala. Scouting was founded in Guatemala on September 24, 1920, and became a member of the World Organization of the Scout Movement in 1930. The association had xxxxxx members as of 2011.

The Scout Association is open to all young people, both boys and girls. Its aim is to promote positive cultural and civic activities and moral standards through out-of-school educational programs.

== Program and ideals ==
The Scout Motto is Siempre listo para servir, Always prepared to serve.

The Scout emblem of the Asociación de Scouts de Guatemala incorporates the quetzal of the coat of arms perched on a shield of the flag of Guatemala.

== Scout Promise ==
"Yo por mi honor prometo, hacer cuanto de mi dependa para cumplir mis deberes para con Dios y la patria, ayudar al prójimo en toda circunstancia y cumplir fielmente la Ley Scout."

== Scout Law ==
- El Scout cifra su honor en ser digno de confianza
- El Scout es leal para con su patria, padres, jefes y subordinados
- El Scout es util y ayuda a los demas sin pensar en recompensa
- El Scout es amigo de todos y hermano de todo Scout sin distincion de credo, raza, nacionalidad o clase social
- El Scout es cortez y actua con nobleza
- El Scout ve en la naturaleza la obra de Dios, protégé a los animales y plantas
- El Scout sonrie y canta en sus dificultades
- El Scout es economico, trabajador y cuidadoso del bien ajeno
- El Scout es limpio, sano y puro de pensamiento, palabras y acciones

== Awards and recognition ==
In 1974, Professor Armando Gálvez was awarded the Bronze Wolf, the only distinction of the World Organization of the Scout Movement, awarded by the World Scout Committee for exceptional services to world Scouting.

Other recipients include Julio Montes Taracena in 1977. He served as a member of the World Scout Committee of Geneva, Switzerland from 1979 to 1985. He was a recipient of the Silver World Award in 1972. He took part in 11 World Conferences in many countries, and attended 14 Interamerican Scout Conferences.

== See also ==
- Asociación Nacional de Muchachas Guías de Guatemala
