= Fritz Vollmar =

Swiss scouting leader (1926–2026)

Friedrich Emanuel "Fritz" Vollmar (17 October 1926 – 8 July 2026) was a Swiss scouting leader and the first Secretary General of the World Wildlife Fund (WWF).

== Early life and education ==
Friedrich Emanuel Vollmar was born in Lenzburg, Switzerland on 17 October 1926.

He studied economics, political science, and business administration, graduating at the University of Bern in 1956. For some years, he worked in humanitarian organizations, public administration, and industry.

== Career ==
In 1962, Fritz Vollmar was elected as first Secretary General of what was then known as the World Wildlife Fund (WWF) at Morges, Switzerland. Starting from scratch, he was responsible for establishing WWF's international headquarters, building up its network of national fundraising organizations, and developing and implementing its international nature conservation programme. At WWF's 10th anniversary in 1971, he was promoted to Director General.

In 1978, after 16 years of service, Fritz Vollmar retired from his position. During this time, WWF had managed to set up 26 national organization and financed 1,882 conservation projects in over 100 countries around the word. For his contributions to these achievements, he was elected Member of Honor of WWF.

In 1978, Fritz Vollmar was elected Director General of the World Scout Foundation in Geneva, created to generate, and provide regular financial support for the World Scout Movement with its over 25 million members in more than 200 countries and territories around the globe, at that time. Soon, the Foundation's regular contributions became a major source of support and helped Scouting to grow and remain the most important educational movement worldwide.

In 1988, Vollmar was awarded the 196th Bronze Wolf Award, the only distinction of the World Organization of the Scout Movement, awarded by the World Scout Committee for exceptional services to world Scouting. He was also a recipient of the Silver World Award.

In 1992, Fritz Vollmar retired from his professional life, to enjoy his retreat at home, at Tolochenaz, at Lake Geneva. There he devoted his time to reading and writing. Over the years, he published several booklets with his poems, aphorisms, and parodies.

== Death ==
Vollmar died in Lausanne on 8 July 2026, at the age of 99.
