= Sten Thiel =

International Commissioner of the Svenska Scoutförbundet

Sten Thiel served as the International Commissioner of the Svenska Scoutförbundet, as well as a member of the International Scout Committee.

In 1953, Thiel was awarded the 8th Bronze Wolf, the only distinction of the World Organization of the Scout Movement, awarded by the World Scout Committee for exceptional services to world Scouting. He was also a 1935 recipient of the Silver Wolf, the highest commendation in Swedish Scouting.
