= 22nd World Scout Jamboree =

International Scout event

- Theme: Simply Scouting
- Location: Rinkaby, Kristianstad, Scania
- Country: Sweden
- Coordinates: 56°0′13″N 14°18′9″E
- Date: 27 July to 7 August 2011
- Attendance: 40,061 Scouts
- Executive Director: Göran Hägerdal
- Chairman: Marie Tallberg
Previous; 21st World Scout Jamboree	Next; 23rd World Scout Jamboree
- Website

The 22nd World Scout Jamboree (Swedish: 22:a världsjamboreen) took place in Rinkaby, Kristianstad, Scania in southern Sweden from 27 July to 7 August 2011. The theme was Simply Scouting. 40,061 Scouts, leaders and adult volunteers participated from 166 different countries.

== Jamboree site ==
The Jamboree was held on the fields of Rinkaby. In 2001, a national Jamboree took place here with 26,700 participants, and another national Jamboree, Jiingijamborii was held here from 14–22 July 2007. The camp area itself lies near the coast on sandy ground surrounded by pine woods. Sandy earth helps rainwater runoff and thus there is no risk of any parts of the camp area being waterlogged. The campsite is approximately 1.5 km by 1.5 km. Small areas of forest divide the campsite into smaller fields. The temperature is varying, average day temperature in the period is 22 degrees Celsius (72 °F), average night temperature is 17 °C (63 °F). The sun rises at 5 o'clock in the morning (05:00). Sunset is at 9 in the evening (or 21:00). Drinking water is available from wells at the field. There is already an extensive water and power system in the ground, dimensioned with the World Scout Jamboree in mind. In the southern part of the field there is space for the arena with a natural amphitheatre. There are sandy beaches near the camp area with sand dunes formed by the wind, creating their own particular type of landscape. The camp organised shuttle buses to the beach.

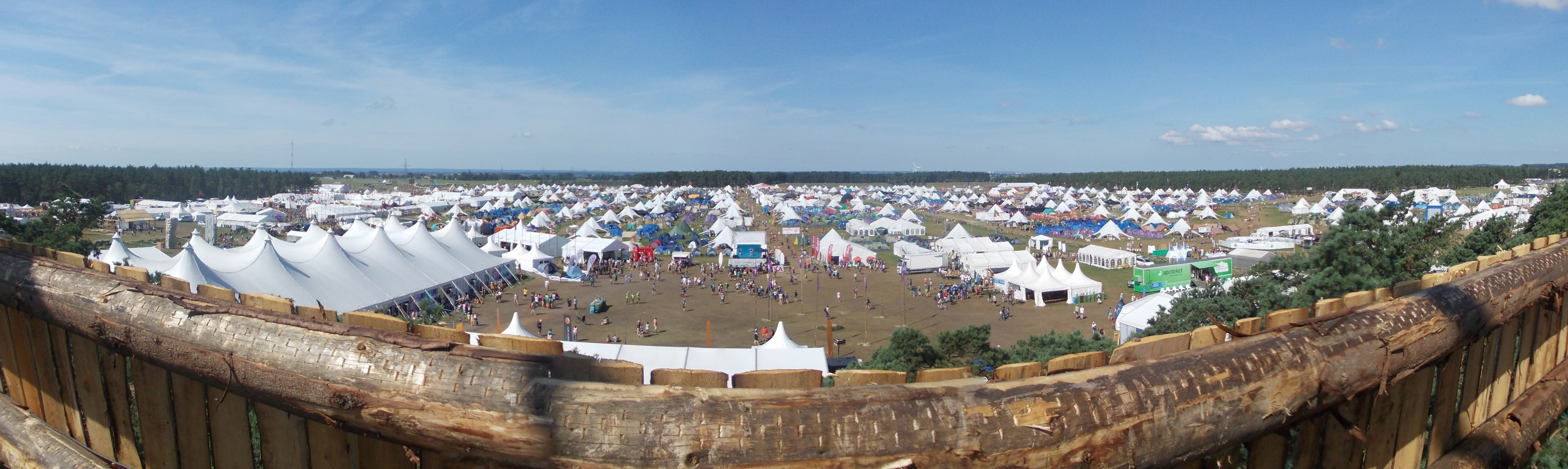
View on Jamboree Site

== Opening and closing ceremonies ==
The opening ceremony took place on 27 July 2011. It included a history and geography of Sweden, with music including the jamboree song "Changing the world" performed by Daniel Lemma and Pär Klang. Also included was a procession of flags (one from each country) and the official handover from Great Britain to Sweden, which involved Bear Grylls abseiling down from the roof of the stage (he had planned to paraglide in but had to change due to bad weather).

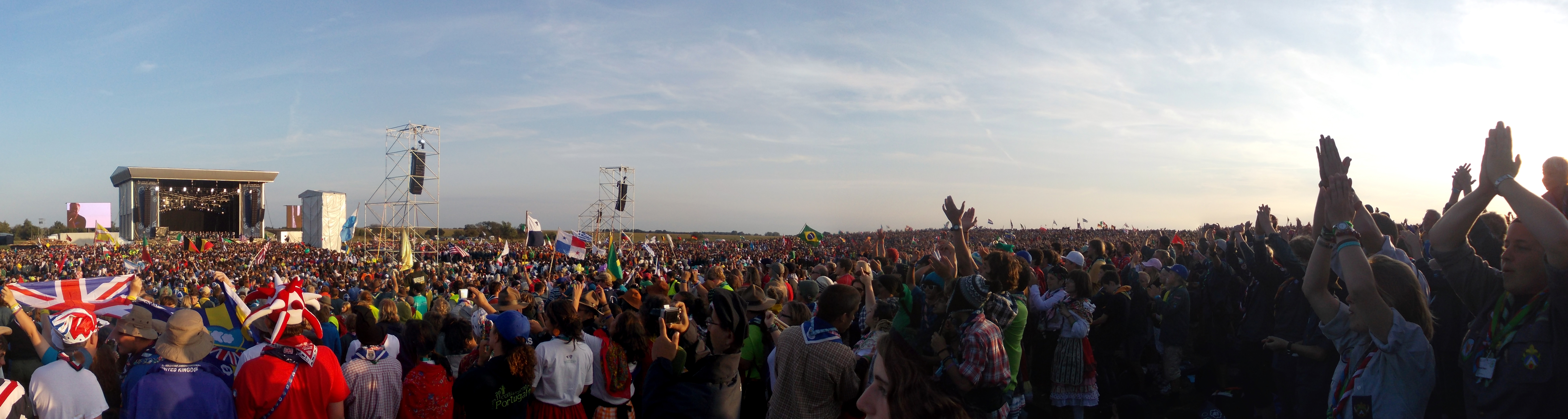
Opening ceremony of 22nd Jamboree 2011

The closing ceremony took place on 6 August 2011, with live music from rock band Europe, playing songs including "The Final Countdown", as well as the Belgian singer Kate Ryan; halfway through her set a storm started with heavy rain. Every Scout reaffirmed the Scout Promise, including the King of Sweden.

== Subcamps ==
Each Town contained six subcamps each consisting of 2,000 Scouts with its own programme of activities. The subcamps were named after different features of Sweden, including cities, rivers and provinces. Within the subcamps each unit consisted of 4 patrols; a patrol consisting of 9 youth and 1 adult. The three towns were:

- Summer
  - Finnerödja
  - Karlstad
  - Smögen
  - Stockholm
  - Vimmerby
  - Visby
- Winter
  - Jukkasjärvi
  - Kiruna
  - Mora
  - Polcirkeln
  - Åre
  - Örnsköldsvik
- Autumn
  - Bohuslän
  - Hunneberg
  - Kivik
  - Klarälven
  - Sarek
  - Svedala

The adult-only Town for IST members and other adults not affiliated with a Sub-camp or participant unit had its own programme of activities :

- Spring

== Module activities ==
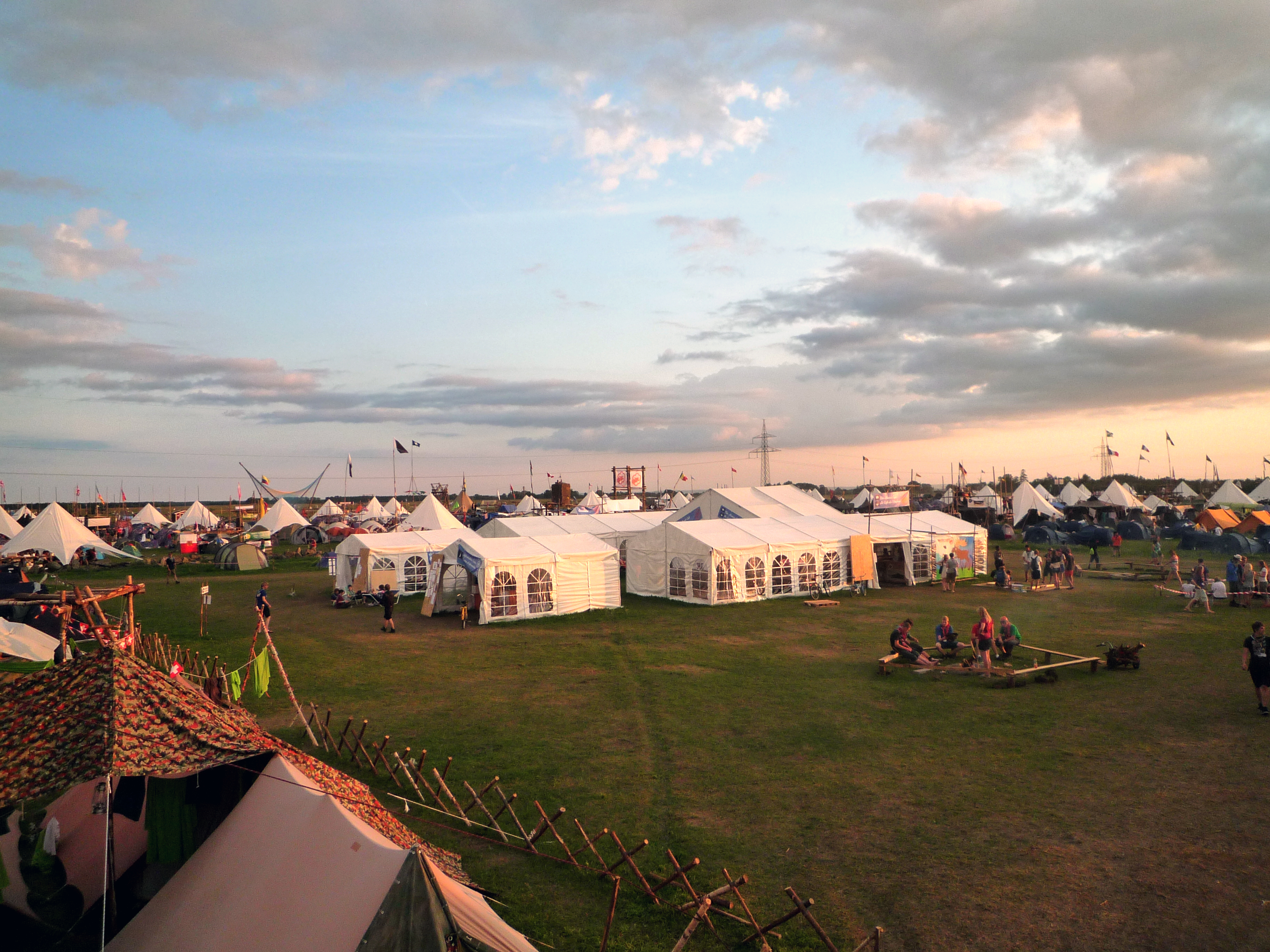
The Hunneberg Subcamp Center during the camp

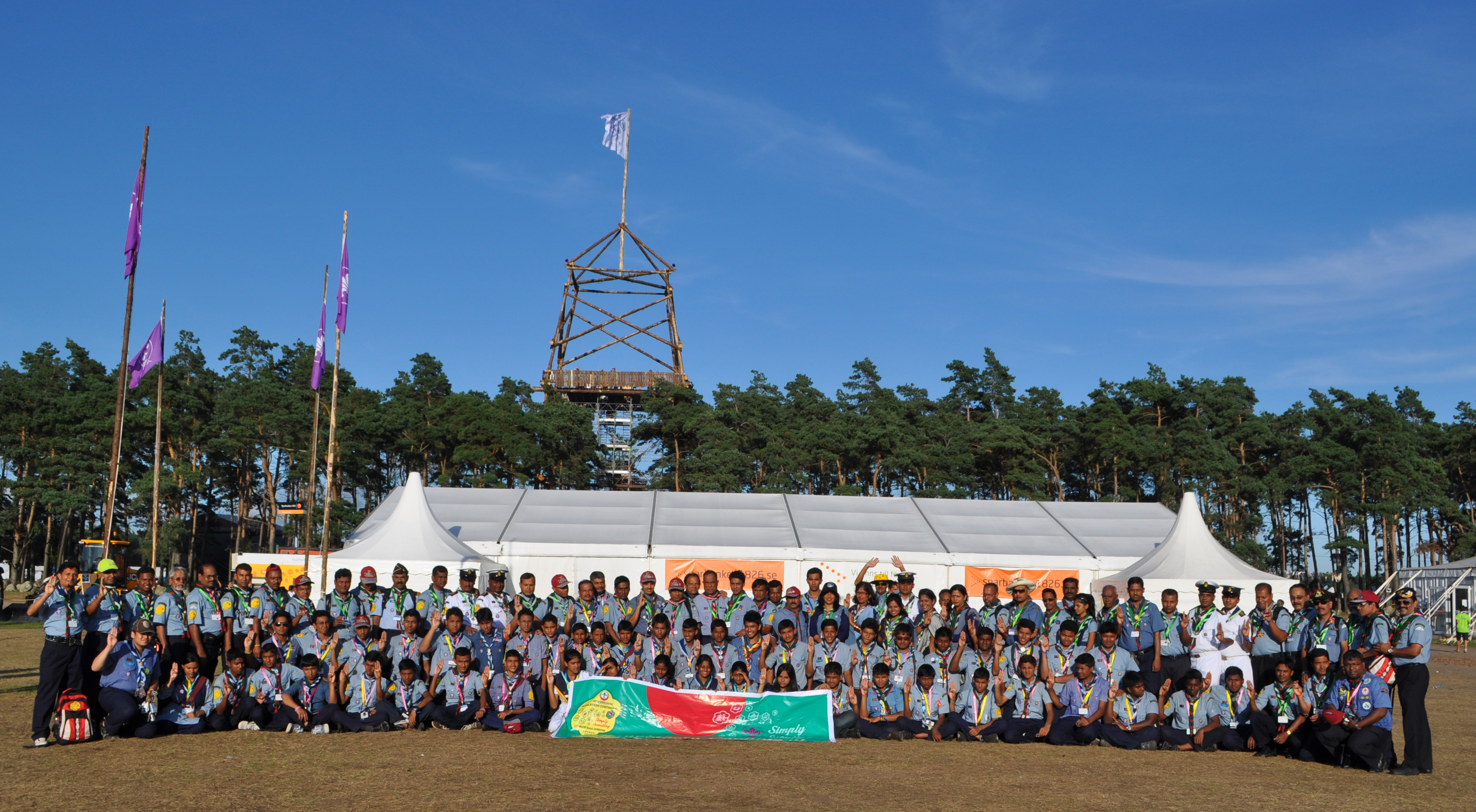
Bangladesh Scouts Contingent on 22nd World Scout Jamboree

The Module Activities Department created and delivered all Module programmes for all the participants at the World Scout Jamboree.

The module activities programme was made up of 5 separate but interlinked strands:

- "People"
- "Quest"
- "Global Development Village"
- "Dream"
- "Earth"

The Module Activities took place over seven days during the camp; every participating Scout was able to visit every Module (five Modules in five days) as well as Camp-in-Camp (for two days). The Activities were approximately 4–5 hours long.

Module Activities Philosophy The Module Activities were meant to provide an engaging Scout programme. Participants were given the opportunity to see modern and well planned activities which delivered new experiences, ideas and knowledge for everyone at the World Scout Jamboree.

Aim of the Modules Every Module had an individual aim and direction that gave the participating Scouts some specific experiences and insights; some of the Modules focused on personal insight and some on knowledge and engagement with more global issues. Some Modules focused on the Scout herself/himself, some on the Scout patrol, and some on a wider group in society or the whole world. All the Modules offered several different thoughts, questions, experiences and feelings – contributing to a positive development for the Scout Movement as well as every Scout at the jamboree.

The Module Activities contributed to a full and positive jamboree experience for the Scouts from all different countries and cultures represented at the camp. An experience that was intended to be unique and fun for each Scout and to contribute to their personal development by focusing on the five areas of personal growth through the use of the Scout Method. The Module Programme encouraged the young people to develop their skills and abilities in the following areas;

- Initiative
- Self-reliance
- Teamwork & cooperation
- Planning & organisation

The Module Programme also provided an opportunity for all of the Scouts to spend time with old friends and at the same time meet many new people and develop many new friendships. Through these new friendships, networks, shared experiences and feelings of solidarity the World Scout Movement continued to develop and prosper.

The activities of the Module Programme provided all Scouts with an opportunity to experience nature, try new ideas that they could take home and to learn how to develop their own ideas from concept to reality. Through this process the Scouts were encouraged and facilitated to challenge their expectations and assumptions and to develop new ways of thinking.

All the Module Activities had a clear objective. The Scout Method was fundamental in the preparation as well as the realization of the work; the Scout Law, “learning by doing” and personal progression were all important to the programme. The Activities also contributed to awareness of nature. Most of the Activities were patrol based – sometimes the Scouts would be in their own patrol and sometimes together with other patrols, or in an international patrol. This contributed to the Scout's individual growth and identity within the group as well as developing the group as a whole. The programme encouraged the Scouts to rethink, reflect and gain new understanding during the activities as well as afterwards.

== International Service Team ==
The International Service Team (IST) was a group of about 10,000 adult volunteers who ran the jamboree.

Program modules for the IST included four themes:

- Our world
- Personal Development
- Spiritual Experience
- New Skills

IST members had to attend at least two activities from two different themes to attain the IST Experience silver badge and three activities from three different themes to attain the gold badge. A patrol of IST consisted of from four to eight Scouts from different countries. Each patrol was assigned to a specific task.

The ISTs from larger contingents lived in Spring town, 40 people from one contingent in a plot.

== See also ==
- Scouting and Guiding in Sweden
