= Erik Ende =

President of the Svenska Scoutrådet
- In office 1976–1983

A. Erik Ende served as the President of the Svenska Scoutrådet, the Swedish national Scouting federation, from 1976 to 1983 for his association Svenska Scoutförbundet.

In 1977, Ende was awarded the 118th Bronze Wolf, the only distinction of the World Organization of the Scout Movement, awarded by the World Scout Committee for exceptional services to world Scouting. He was also the 73rd recipient of the Silver Wolf, Sweden's highest Scout award, in 1969.
