= Dorion =

Dorion can mean:

== Places ==
In Greece:

- Dorion (Greece), a town of ancient Messenia

In Canada:

- Former city of Dorion, which merged with Vaudreuil to make Vaudreuil-Dorion
- Laurier-Dorion, a current Quebec provincial electoral district in Montreal
  - Dorion, a former Quebec provincial electoral district
  - Montréal-Dorion, a former Quebec provincial electoral district in Montreal
- Dorion, Ontario, a township in northwestern Ontario
- Dorion Township, renamed in 1988 to Cayamant, Quebec
- Dorion-Rigaud line, a commuter rail line operated in the Greater Montreal, Quebec, Canada now known as Vaudreuil-Hudson

== Persons ==
- Antoine-Aimé Dorion (January 17, 1818 – May 31, 1891), a French Canadian politician and jurist
- Dan Dorion (born March 2, 1963), a retired American ice hockey player
- Éric Dorion (born June 24, 1970), a politician from Quebec, Canada
- Jacques Dorion (ca 1797 – December 29, 1877), a doctor and political figure in Lower Canada
- Jean Dorion (1942–2026), Canadian politician, sociologist, and a Quebec nationalist leader
- Jean-Baptiste-Éric Dorion (September 17, 1826 – November 1, 1866), a journalist and political figure in Canada East
- Marie Aioe Dorion (c.1786 – September 5, 1850), only female member of the Astor Expedition
- Noël Dorion (July 24, 1904 - March 9, 1980), a law professor, lawyer and Canadian politician
- Pierre-Antoine Dorion (ca 1789 – September 12, 1850), a businessman and political figure in Lower Canada
- Pierre-Nérée Dorion (October 16, 1816 – 1874), a Quebec land surveyor and political figure
- Roberto Dorion

== Given name ==
- Dorion Sagan (born 1959), an American science writer and son of Carl Sagan
