= Göran Hägerdal =

Swedish Scout leader (born 1966)

Karl Göran Hägerdal (Swedish pronunciation: [kɑːɭ ˈjø̂ːran ˈhɛ̂ːɡɛˌɖɑːl], born March 11, 1966, in Kristdala parish, Kalmar County, Sweden) is the Global Director of Scouting Development at the World Scout Bureau headquarters of the World Organization of the Scout Movement in Kuala Lumpur, and served as one of three camp chiefs of the 22nd World Scout Jamboree at Rinkaby, Skåne, from 27 July to 7 August 2011. Between 2004 and 2012 he was Deputy Secretary General of the Svenska Scoutrådet, the former umbrella organization for Swedish Scouting.

Hägerdal has been involved in the Scout movement in various roles since age eight. In 1996, he was deputy camp chief of the World Scout Moot conducted in Ransberg Manor, Ransäter, Värmland. In 2001, he was one of two responsible for the program in Scout 2001, Sweden's first national jamboree between all five Swedish Scout associations. In 2007 Hägerdal one of three camp chiefs of the Svenska Scoutrådet Jiingijamborii.

During the 21st World Scout Jamboree in England in 2007, Hägerdal was awarded the Silver Wolf, Sweden's highest Scout award, and is also a recipient of the Silver World Award.

In 2020, Hägerdal was awarded the 372nd Bronze Wolf, the only distinction of the World Organization of the Scout Movement, awarded by the World Scout Committee for exceptional services to world Scouting.
