= Luis Esteban Palacios =

Chairman of the Inter-American Scout Committee

Luis Esteban Palacios W. of Venezuela served as the Chairman of the Inter-American Scout Committee.

In 1974, he was awarded the 89th Bronze Wolf, the only distinction of the World Organization of the Scout Movement, awarded by the World Scout Committee for exceptional services to world Scouting. He was also a recipient of the Silver World Award.
