= Kō Yoshida =

- Known for: Member of the World Scout Committee

Kō Yoshida (吉田 宏, Yoshida Kō) (1913 – 27 February 2009) served as a member of the World Scout Committee, the International Commissioner of the Boy Scouts of Nippon, and as a member of the board of the World Scout Foundation.

== Background ==
Yoshida served in the Imperial Japanese Army as an officer during his youth and was a successful entrepreneur. He was an avid mountaineer and member of the Himalayan Club since 1978.

In 1993, Yoshida was awarded the 230th Bronze Wolf, the only distinction of WOSM, awarded by the World Scout Committee for exceptional services to world Scouting. In 2008 he also received the highest distinction of the Scout Association of Japan, the Golden Pheasant Award. He was then Chairman of the foundation of the Companions of Baden-Powell.

After his death on 27 February 2009, King Carl XVI Gustav of Sweden, President of the World Organization of the Scout Movement, sent flowers to express his condolences to his friend.
