= Howard Kilroy =

Irish accountant and businessman (1936–2019)

- Born: 30 January 1936
- Died: 17 May 2019 (aged 83)
- Occupation: Company Director
- Known for: World Scout Foundation

Howard Kilroy (30 January 1936 – 17 May 2019) was an Irish accountant and businessman. He was a governor of the Bank of Ireland, CFO of Smurfit Kappa and board member at Cement Roadstone Holdings (CRH). His involvement in Scouting at World Level, including his role as chairman of the investment Committee of World Scout Foundation, and of the Irish chapter of the Baden-Powell Fellowship, earned him a Bronze Wolf Award in 2011.

== Early life ==
Kilroy attended The High School in Rathgar, Dublin.
