= Shieh You-hwa =

- 謝又華

Member of the Asia-Pacific Scout Committee

Shieh You-hwa (Chinese: 謝又華; pinyin: Xiè Yòuhuá) served as a member of the Asia-Pacific Scout Committee. In 1976, Shieh was awarded the 111th Bronze Wolf, the only distinction of the World Organization of the Scout Movement, awarded by the World Scout Committee for exceptional services to world Scouting, as well as the Silver World Award of the Boy Scouts of America the same year.
