= H. Morrey Cross =

Canadian chemical engineer and scouting leader

International Commissioner of Scouts Canada

H. Morrey Cross (1921–2008) served as the International Commissioner of Scouts Canada.

Morrey Cross graduated as a chemical engineer from McGill University in 1943, and immediately began his Canadian Army service. Upon discharge in 1946, he launched his career with Canadian International Paper Company (CIP), and in 1955 began his decades-long career with JWI Ltd. where he held various management and executive positions, in Montreal, England and Kanata, until his retirement at age 70.

At age 12, he had begun a lifelong commitment to the scouting movement. Throughout his career he volunteered at all levels in the movement, from local troop leader, to International Commissioner for Scouts Canada, and representative at the World Scout Committee. During this time he was the recipient of numerous national and international awards for his service. His leadership and dedication to community service extended well beyond the Scouts, including serving with the Unitarian Service Committee of Canada (USC), and the Board of Bishop Hamilton School. His faith was an important element in his life, and he was always fully involved in his church community. For the past 30 years he was an active member of All Saints' Anglican Church, Westboro. He served the church in many capacities, in particular as Treasurer for over 20 years, retiring from that role at age 87. He also held a number of volunteer and elected positions with the Diocese over many years.

In 1983, Cross was awarded the 162nd Bronze Wolf, the only distinction of the World Organization of the Scout Movement, awarded by the World Scout Committee for exceptional services to world Scouting. He was also a recipient of the Silver World Award.
