= Robin Gold =

Lt. Col. Robin Gold

International Commissioner of the Scout Association

Lt. Col. Robin Gold served as the International Commissioner of The Scout Association.

In 1973, Gold was awarded the 79th Bronze Wolf, the only distinction of the World Organization of the Scout Movement, awarded by the World Scout Committee for exceptional services to world Scouting. He was also a recipient of the Silver World Award.
