= Rinkaby Church =

- Rinkaby kyrka
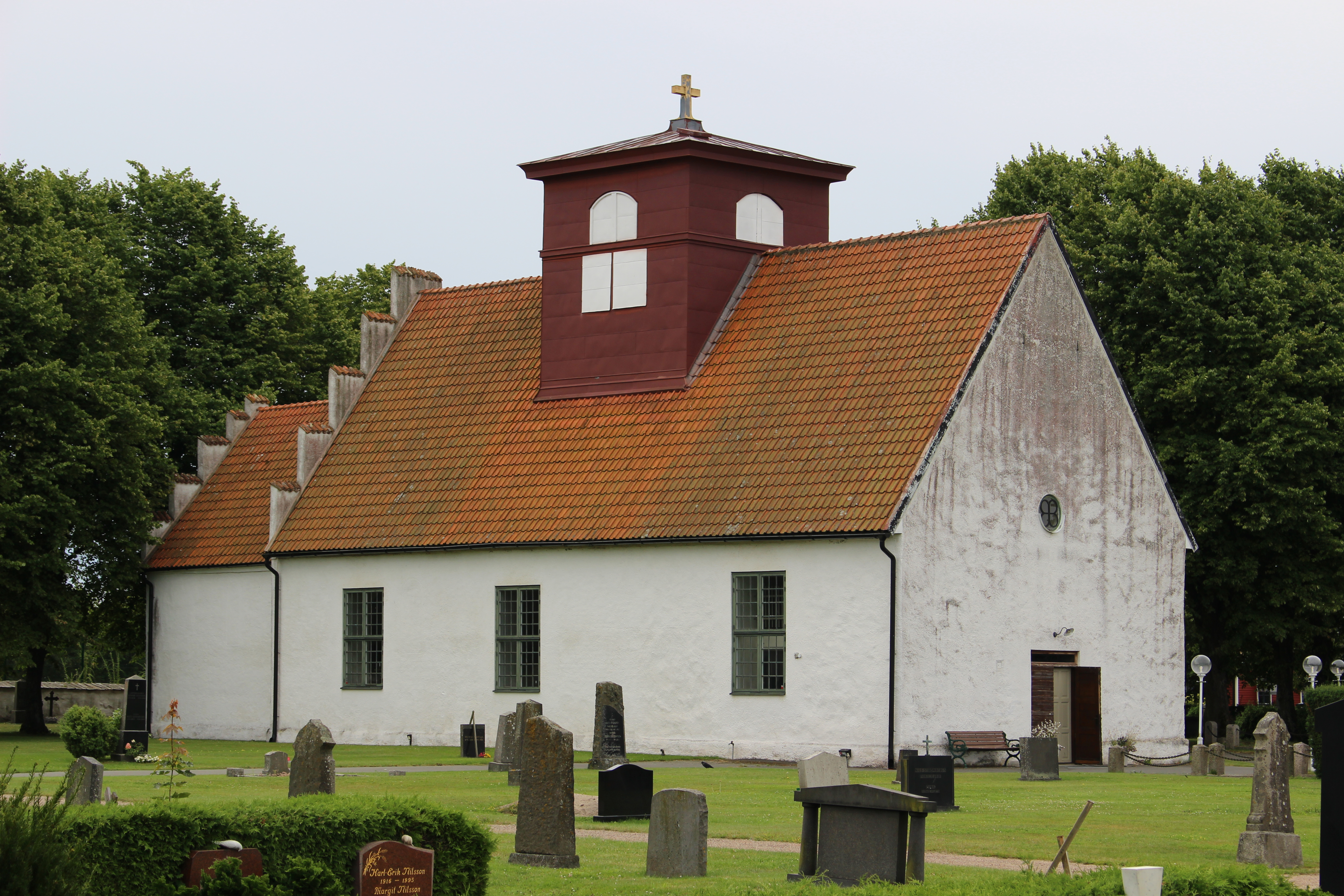
- Rinkaby Church

- Location within Skåne Location within Sweden
- 55°59′03″N 14°16′12″E
- Country: Sweden
- Denomination: Church of Sweden

Administration
- Diocese: Lund

Rinkaby Church (Swedish: Rinkaby kyrka) is a 13th-century church in Rinkaby, Scania, Sweden. Rinkaby Church contains medieval murals and an astronomical clock. It belongs to the Church of Sweden.

== History ==
Rinkaby Church was built c. 1250. The building material is brick, and it was probably loosely modeled on the church in Åhus. It originally consisted of a nave and a choir without an apse. The vaults of the choir probably date from the construction period, while the vaults in the nave were built during the 15th century. The church porch was built around the same time. The church was enlarged in 1794, and it was probably also then that the wooden superstructure on the roof, containing the church bells, was built.

== Interior ==
The church contains medieval murals from the late 15th century. They contain both religious subjects and scenes from late medieval everyday life. The altarpiece is from 1695 and contains the monogram of King Charles XI of Sweden. It is Baroque in style and its central panel contains a depiction of Christ carrying the cross. The decorated baptismal font is probably as old as the church. The pulpit is from the late 17th century and made of oak wood; the sides of it are decorated with gilded sculptures of the Four Evangelists. The church also has an astronomical clock made in the 1950s after medieval models by an electrician living in the vicinity of the church.
