= Hartmut Keyler =

German architect (1936–2025)

- Born: 29 June 1936; Esslingen am Neckar, Free People's State of Württemberg, Germany
- Died: 4 October 2025 (aged 89); Munich, Bavaria, Germany
- Education: Staatsbauschule München
- Occupation: Architect
- Awards: Bundesverdienstkreuz, Bronze Wolf, Silver World Award

Hartmut Keyler (29 June 1936 – 4 October 2025) was a German architect who served as a member of the World Scout Committee, as well as a member of the European Scout Committee.

== Early life and professional career ==
Keyler was born in Esslingen am Neckar, and attended school in Esslingen, Korntal and Munich. From 1953 to 1955 he was apprenticed as a carpenter. Beginning in 1955, Keyler studied architecture at the Staatsbauschule München (today: Munich University of Applied Sciences). Since 1959, he worked as freelance architect in Munich.

Keyler became a member of Bund Deutscher Architekten and Deutscher Werkbund in 1971. In 1994, he was appointed to the Bayerische Akademie Ländlicher Raum.

== Scouting ==
Being a Scout in the Christliche Pfadfinderschaft Deutschlands and the Verband Christlicher Pfadfinderinnen und Pfadfinder since 1949, Keyler served twice in the European Scout Committee (1968–1972 and 1977–1980) as well as in the World Scout Committee (1971–1975 and 1985–1993). In 1969, he was among the founders of the Deutschsprachige Konferenz der Pfadfinderverbände. He was a member of the World honours and awards committee of the World Organization of the Scout Movement since 2005.

In 1979, Keyler was awarded the 137th Bronze Wolf, the only distinction of the World Organization of the Scout Movement, for exceptional services to world Scouting. He was also a recipient of the Silver World Award.

== Death ==
Keyler died in Munich on 4 October 2025, at the age of 89.

== Works ==
- Bauer, Ulrich; Keyler, Hartmut; Besser, Jobst; Sudermann, Albrecht, eds. (2013). Kreuz und Lilie: Christliche Pfadfinder in Deutschland von 1909 bis 1972. Wichern-Verlag. ISBN 978-3-88981-365-7.
- Keyler, Hartmut (2015). "Eine historisch-gesellschaftliche Rekonstruktion zum weltweiten Pfadfinden". In Witte, Matthias D. (ed.). Pfadfinden weltweit. Die Internationalität der Pfadfindergemeinschaft in der Diskussion. Springer VS. pp. 19–33. ISBN 978-3-658-09951-0.
