= Franz Dunshirn =

Austrian Scout leader

President of the Pfadfinder und Pfadfinderinnen Österreichs

Franz Dunshirn was an Austrian Scout leader who served as the President of the Pfadfinder und Pfadfinderinnen Österreichs, the Austrian Scout and Guide association.

In 1988, Dunshirn was awarded the 190th Bronze Wolf, the only distinction of the World Organization of the Scout Movement, awarded by the World Scout Committee for exceptional services to world Scouting. He was also a recipient of the Silver World Award.
