= John L. MacGregor =

Canadian Scouts Movement official

Executive Director of the Relationships Committee of Scouts Canada

John L. MacGregor served as the Executive Director of the Relationships Committee of Scouts Canada.

In 1983, MacGregor was awarded the 164th Bronze Wolf, the only distinction of the World Organization of the Scout Movement, awarded by the World Scout Committee for exceptional services to world Scouting. He was also a recipient of the Silver World Award.
