= Julio Montes Taracena =

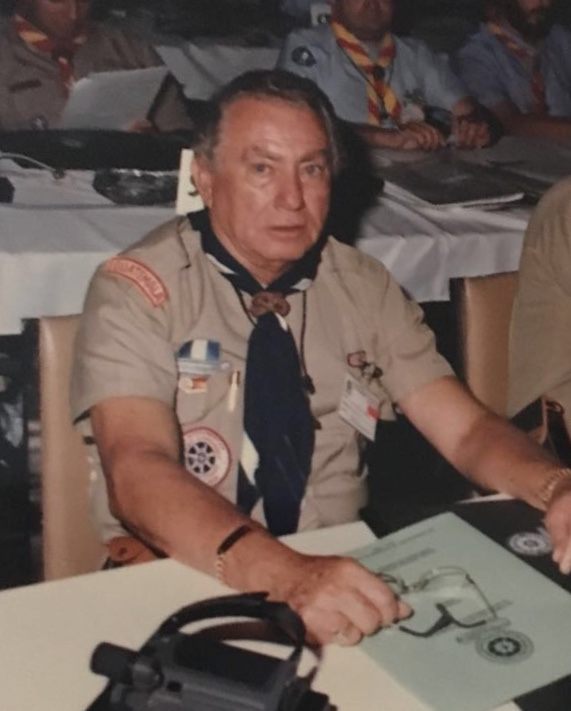
- Born: Julio Guillermo; 26 January 1915; Guatemala City
- Died: 13 April 1997 (aged 82); Antigua Guatemala
- Occupations: Owner of the El Rosario Grande farm, Tumbador, San Marcos, Guatemala
- Years active: 60
- Known for: Member of the World Scout Bureau of Geneva, Switzerland, 1979-1985
- Notable work: Chief of Scouts of Guatemala
- Spouse: Elena Dominguez de Montes
- Children: Ana Maria Montes D., Heinz Julio Montes D., Rosa Maria Montes D.

Julio Montes Taracena (1915–1997) of Guatemala served as a member of the World Organization of the Scout Movement in Geneva, Switzerland from 1979 to 1985.

In 1977, Montes was awarded the 120th Bronze Wolf, the only distinction of the World Organization of the Scout Movement, awarded by the World Scout Committee for exceptional services to world Scouting. He was also a recipient of the Silver World Award.

== Background ==
He was the owner of the El Rosario Grande farm in Tumbador, San Marcos, Guatemala.

He was an instrumental volunteer leader of Scouting in Guatemala.

== Scouting ==
Montes Taracena took part in the following World Scout Conferences:

- 1965 20th World Scout Conference Mexico City
- 1967 21st World Scout Conference Seattle, Washington, United States
- 1969 22nd World Scout Conference Espoo, Finland
- 1971 23rd World Scout Conference Tokyo, Japan
- 1973 24th World Scout Conference Nairobi, Kenya
- 1975 25th World Scout Conference Lundtoft, Denmark
- 1977 26th World Scout Conference Montreal, Canada
- 1979 27th World Scout Conference Birmingham, United Kingdom
- 1981 28th World Scout Conference Dakar, Senegal
- 1985 30th World Scout Conference Munich, West Germany
- 1988 31st World Scout Conference Melbourne, Australia

J. Montes attended the following Interamerican Scout Conferences:

- 1957 4th Interamerican Scout Conference - February in Rio de Janeiro, Brasil
- 1961 5th Interamerican Scout Conference - February in Caracas, Venezuela
- 1964 6th Interamerican Scout Conference - August in Kingston, Jamaica
- 1968 7th Interamerican Scout Conference - July in San Salvador, El Salvador
- 1972 8th Interamerican Scout Conference - August in Lima, Peru
- 1974 9th Interamerican Scout Conference - August in Miami, Florida, United States
- 1976 10th Interamerican Scout Conference - August in Mexico City, Mexico
- 1978 11th Interamerican Scout Conference - June in Guatemala, City, Guatemala
- 1980 12th Interamerican Scout Conference - October in Santiago, Chile
- 1982 13th Interamerican Scout Conference - July in Nassau, Bahamas
- 1984 14th Interamerican Scout Conference - September in Curitiba, Paraná, Brazil
- 1986 15th Interamerican Scout Conference - July in Port of Spain, Trinidad and Tobago
- 1988 16th Interamerican Scout Conference - September in Buenos Aires, Argentina
- 1990 17th Interamerican Scour Conference - September in Montevideo, Uruguay
