= Victor Steiner Sr. =

President of the Asociación de Scouts de El Salvador

Personal details
- Awards: Bronze Wolf Award, Silver World Award

Víctor Adriano Steiner Vilanova Sr. served as the President of the Asociación de Scouts de El Salvador.

In 1974, Steiner was awarded the 91st Bronze Wolf, the only distinction of the World Organization of the Scout Movement, awarded by the World Scout Committee for exceptional services to world Scouting. He was also a recipient of the Silver World Award.
