= Bennett B. Shotade =

Africa Regional Scout Commissioner of the World Scout Bureau

Bennett B. Shotade served as the Africa Regional Scout Commissioner of the World Scout Bureau.

In 1977, Shotade was awarded the 112th Bronze Wolf, the only distinction of the World Organization of the Scout Movement, awarded by the World Scout Committee for exceptional services to world Scouting. He was also a recipient of the Silver World Award.
