= F. O. Ogunlana =

F. O. Ogunlana served as the Treasurer of the Africa Scout Region of the World Scout Bureau.

In 1979, he was awarded the 138th Bronze Wolf, the only distinction of the World Organization of the Scout Movement, awarded by the World Scout Committee for exceptional services to world Scouting. He was also a recipient of the Silver World Award.
