= Marc Noble =

Major Sir Marc Noble

Commonwealth Commissioner of the Scout Association

Major Sir Marc Noble (1927– January 1991) was a Scouting official. He was the Commonwealth Commissioner of the Scout Association, as well as the Chairman of the World Budget and Treasury Committee of the World Organization of the Scout Movement.

In 1988, Noble received the 197th Bronze Wolf, the only award presented by the World Scout Committee, in recognition of outstanding service to the World Scout Movement. He was also a recipient of the Silver World Award.

Noble was the great grandson of the engineer Isambard Kingdom Brunel.

He was High Sheriff of Kent in 1985-86. He was awarded a CBE in the New Years Honours list 1991, but died of cancer a week later.
