= Hercules Bay =

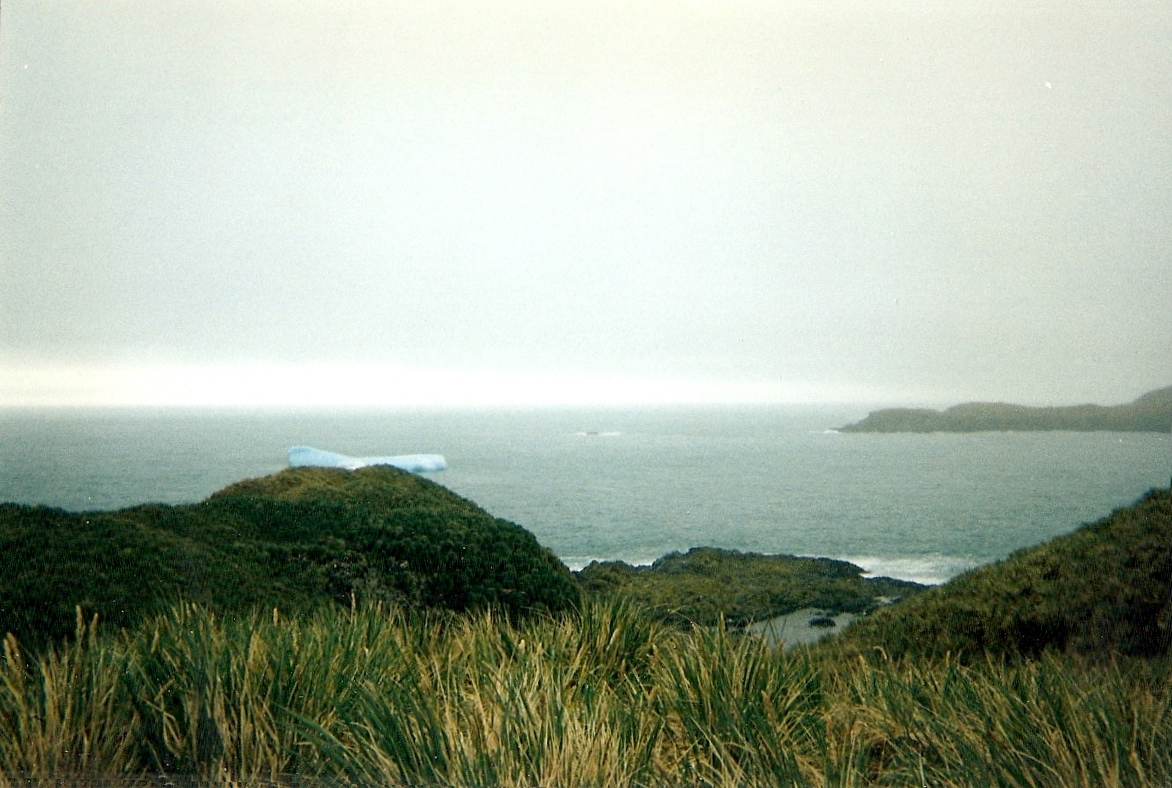
- Hercules Bay in South Georgia Island, 1996.

- Location within South Georgia Island
- Coordinates: 54°7′S 36°40′W
- Ocean/sea sources: South Atlantic Ocean
- Islands: South Georgia

Hercules Bay is a bay 0.5 nautical miles (1 km) wide, which lies 1 nautical mile (2 km) west-northwest of Cape Saunders along the north coast of South Georgia. It was named by Norwegian whalers after the Hercules (or Herkules), a whale catcher which had visited the bay. In the entrance of the bay lies Turpie Rock.
