= Armando Gálvez =

Professor Armando Gálvez

National Executive Commissioner of the Asociación de Scouts de Guatemala

Professor Armando Gálvez C. served as the National Executive Commissioner of the Asociación de Scouts de Guatemala.

In 1974, he was awarded the 85th Bronze Wolf, the only distinction of the World Organization of the Scout Movement, awarded by the World Scout Committee for exceptional services to world Scouting.
