= João Armando Gonçalves =

Portuguese Scouting professional (born 1963)

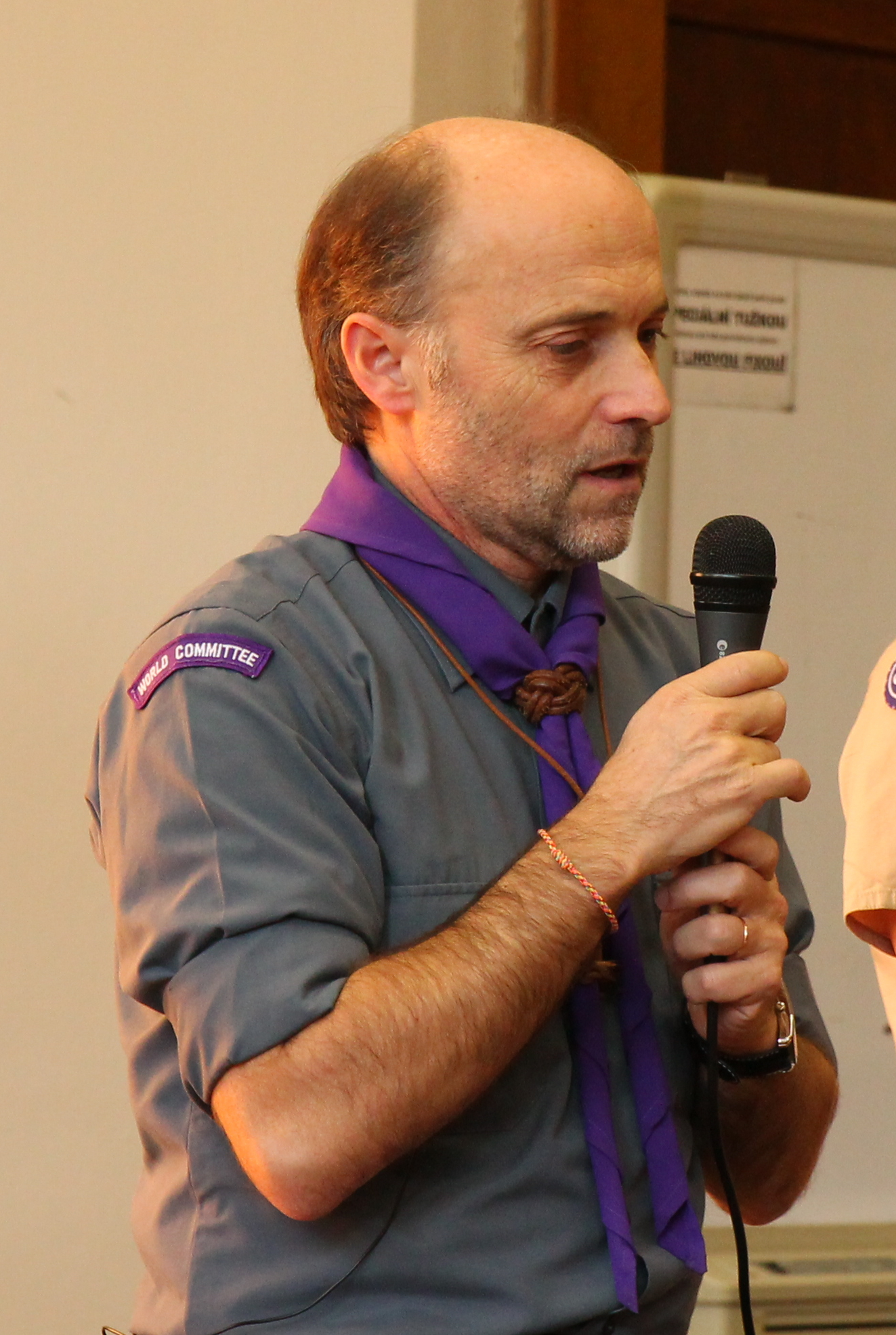
- Gonçalves in 2015
- Born: 19 September 1963 (age 61); Figueira da Foz, Portugal
- Occupation: Scouting professional
- Title: Chairperson of the World Scout Committee (2014–2017)

João Armando Pereira Gonçalves, ComIH of Figueira da Foz, Portugal (born 19 September 1963) is the former chairperson of the World Scout Committee, the main executive body of the World Organization of the Scout Movement. He was a member of the European Scout Committee for a period of six years, elected in 2004 and again in 2007, and was elected to the World Scout Committee at the 39th World Scout Conference in Brazil in January 2011. He was re-elected to the committee at the 40th World Scout Conference in Ljubljana, Slovenia in 2014.

Gonçalves started in his local Scout group in 1976, and is a member of the Corpo Nacional de Escutas – Escutismo Católico Português of the Federação Escotista de Portugal. He participated in the 1995 World Jamboree in the Netherlands, took office in the National Team of the CNE in 2000 as the national commissioner of the Rover branch (Caminheiros), and served as director of the first Roverway, held in Portugal in 2003. Later he was installed as the International Commissioner of the CNE.

In 2018, João was awarded the 363rd Bronze Wolf, the only distinction of the World Organization of the Scout Movement, awarded by the World Scout Committee for exceptional services to world Scouting.

In 2018, João was awarded the Silver World Award a distinguished service award of the Boy Scouts of America (BSA).

World Organization of the Scout Movement
Preceded by Simon Hang-bock Rhee	Chairman, World Scout Committee; 2014–2017	Succeeded by Craig Turpie
