= Asociación Nacional de Muchachas Guías de Guatemala =

- National Girl Guide Association of Guatemala

- logo
- Country: Guatemala
- Founded: 1935
- Membership: 980
- Affiliation: World Association of Girl Guides and Girl Scouts
- Website www.guiasguatemala.org

The Asociación Nacional de Muchachas Guías de Guatemala (ANMG; roughly National Girl Guide Association of Guatemala) is the national Guiding organization of Guatemala. It serves 980 members (as of 2003). Founded in 1935, the girls-only organization became an associate member of the World Association of Girl Guides and Girl Scouts in 1957 and a full member in 1969.

== Program ==
The association is divided in five sections according to age:

- Abeja - ages 4 to 6
- Caperucita - ages 7 to 9
- Guía pequeña - ages 10 to 12
- Guía intermedia - ages 13 to 15
- Guía mayor - ages 16 to 18

== See also ==
- Asociación de Scouts de Guatemala
