= Roberto Dorion =

President and International Commissioner of the Asociación de Scouts de Guatemala

Roberto Dorion B. served as the president and international commissioner of the Asociación de Scouts de Guatemala, as well as the chairman of the Interamerican Scout Committee.

In 1995, he was awarded the 239th Bronze Wolf, the only distinction of the World Organization of the Scout Movement, awarded by the World Scout Committee for exceptional services to world Scouting. He was also a recipient of the Silver World Award.
