= Silver Wolf Award (Scouterna) =

Silver Wolf
- Owner: Scouterna
- Awarded for: Outstanding service to Scouting and Guiding in Sweden

The Silver Wolf (Swedish: Silvervargen) is the highest award made by Swedish Scouting, to active leaders at the national level for exceptionally meritorious work. The award consists of a stylized silver wolf with a fleur-de-lis with the words "Scouterna", suspended from a turquoise neck ribbon. The Silver Wolf will be distributed by someone who already holds the award.

The Silver Wolf was established in 1920 for extraordinary contributions to Scouting. The original badge also meant that apart from being first-class, the Scout also passed tests for first aid and another 15 specific merit badges.

When the 1935 World Scout Conference decided that each country would have a Silver Wolf as the highest award at the national level, Sweden chose to continue with the Silver Wolf, but then changed so that the Svenska Scoutunionen (Swedish Scout Union) distributed it. At this time the Silver Wolf took on the form it has today.

The first Silver Wolf was awarded to Ebbe Lieberath in 1920. The first awarded the Silver Wolf in its new form was Prince Gustaf Adolf, Duke of Västerbotten in 1935. In 1970, Ingrid Ericsson was the first woman awarded the Silver Wolf.

== Recipients ==
Notable recipients included Lord Baden-Powell, Hubert S. Martin, Hugo Cedergren, Sten Thiel, Folke Bernadotte, J. S. Wilson, Bengt Junker, Daniel C. Spry, John Thurman, A. Erik Ende, Bertil Tunje, King Carl XVI Gustaf, Göran Hägerdal, Rick Cronk, and Wayne M. Perry.

== See also ==
- Bronze Wolf of the World Scout Committee
- Silver Wolf of The Scout Association
- Silver Wolf of the Norwegian Guide and Scout Association
- Silver Buffalo Award of the Boy Scouts of America
- Silver World Award of the Boy Scouts of America
- Silver Fish Award of the Girl Guides Association
