= E. Bower Carty =

Canadian scouting official

Chairman of the World Scout Committee

Personal details
- Born: Edward Bower Carty; 24 April 1916 Ottawa, Ontario, Canada
- Died: 23 May 2001 (aged 85) Ottawa, Ontario, Canada

Edward Bower Carty (24 April 1916 – May 23, 2001) was a Canadian public servant who served as the Chairman of the World Scout Committee. In 1975, Carty was awarded the 95th Bronze Wolf, the only distinction of the World Organization of the Scout Movement, awarded by the World Scout Committee for exceptional services to world Scouting, at the 25th World Scout Conference. He was also a recipient of the Silver World Award.

He received his degree in communication from McGill University in 1939. He was awarded an honorary doctorate by Carleton University in 1994.
