= Johan Kromann =

Chairman of the Programme Committee of the World Organization of the Scout Movement

Johan Kromann of Denmark served as the Chairman of the Programme Committee of the World Organization of the Scout Movement.

In 1975, Kromann was awarded the 101st Bronze Wolf, the only distinction of the World Organization of the Scout Movement, awarded by the World Scout Committee for exceptional services to world Scouting, at the 25th World Scout Conference. He was also a recipient of the Silver World Award.
