= El Tumbador =

- Municipality
- Location in San Marcos Department, Guatemala El Tumbador (Guatemala)
- Coordinates: 14°52′00″N 91°56′00″W
- Country: Guatemala
- Department: San Marcos

Government
  - Mayor: Augusto Echeverría (LIDER)

Area
  - Municipality: 166 km^{2} (64 sq mi)

Population (2018 census)
  - Municipality: 44,395
  - Density: 267/km^{2} (693/sq mi)
  - Urban: 8,856
- Climate: Am

El Tumbador is a town and municipality in the San Marcos department of Guatemala. The population is mostly of Mam people, who speak their own language. It was founded in 1878.

The main source of income is agriculture—farming and animal husbandry. People produce mostly coffee, but also sugarcane, beans, cassava, fruits and spices—cardamom and macadamia. Cattle, horses, sheep and goats are bred in the area as well.

El Tumbador gave its name to the Belgian Non-governmental organization Tumbador vzw that used to support a project in the municipality.

== Climate ==
El Tumbador has tropical climate (Köppen: Am).

Climate data for El Tumbador
Month	Jan	Feb	Mar	Apr	May	Jun	Jul	Aug	Sep	Oct	Nov	Dec	Year
Mean daily maximum °C (°F)	28.7 (83.7)	29.0 (84.2)	29.9 (85.8)	30.0 (86.0)	29.6 (85.3)	28.4 (83.1)	29.0 (84.2)	29.2 (84.6)	28.3 (82.9)	28.3 (82.9)	28.4 (83.1)	28.6 (83.5)	29.0 (84.1)
Daily mean °C (°F)	22.6 (72.7)	22.9 (73.2)	23.6 (74.5)	24.0 (75.2)	23.9 (75.0)	23.2 (73.8)	23.4 (74.1)	23.5 (74.3)	23.1 (73.6)	23.1 (73.6)	22.9 (73.2)	22.8 (73.0)	23.3 (73.9)
Mean daily minimum °C (°F)	16.6 (61.9)	16.8 (62.2)	17.3 (63.1)	18.1 (64.6)	18.3 (64.9)	18.0 (64.4)	17.8 (64.0)	17.9 (64.2)	17.9 (64.2)	17.9 (64.2)	17.5 (63.5)	17.0 (62.6)	17.6 (63.7)
Average precipitation mm (inches)	47 (1.9)	58 (2.3)	121 (4.8)	260 (10.2)	536 (21.1)	724 (28.5)	513 (20.2)	543 (21.4)	747 (29.4)	618 (24.3)	187 (7.4)	76 (3.0)	4,430 (174.5)
Source: Climate-Data.org

== Geographic location ==
It is surrounded by San Marcos Department municipalities:
