= Scouting and Guiding in Sweden =

Scouting and Guiding in Sweden is represented by one organisation Scouterna as a member of the World Organization of the Scout Movement and World Association of Girl Guides and Girl Scouts. It was formed in 2012 as the successor to Svenska Scoutrådet (The Swedish Guide and Scout Council, SSR) which consisted of five different associations.

Scouting in Sweden was founded in 1916 by Ebbe Liberath and Guiding followed in 1910. The Swedish Boy Scouts were among the charter members of the World Organization of the Scout Movement in 1922. The Girl Guides were among the founders of the World Association of Girl Guides and Girl Scouts in 1928.

Swedish Scouting has close relations to the Swedish royal family. King Carl XVI Gustaf of Sweden is the most prominent member of the Scouterna and the Honorary President of the World Scout Foundation- All his children are members of the movement.

The Swedish Scout motto is: "Var redo!" – "Alltid redo!" (Be Prepared! – Always prepared!; the first phrase issued, and the second phrase as a reply).

== Svenska Scoutrådet ==
The Svenska Scoutrådet was formed in 1961 and consisted of five associations, some of them with a number of affiliates:

- Svenska Scoutförbundet (The Swedish Guide and Scout Association, SSF) was Sweden's largest Scouting organization with 55,500 members. Their approach to Scouting is interreligious.
- Svenska Missionskyrkans Ungdom Scout (SMU), commonly known as "SMU Scout" is the Guide and Scout organization of the Mission Covenant Youth of Sweden and was Sweden's second biggest Scouting organization with 18,500 members. Since 2008 it included two former member organizations of KFUK-KFUMs Scoutförbund:
  - Baptistscouter (Scout Association of the Baptist Union of Sweden) with 3,000 members
  - Metodistscouter (Scout Association of the United Methodist Church) with 140 members.
- KFUK-KFUMs Scoutförbund (The Swedish YMCA-YWCA Guide and Scout Association) was Sweden's third biggest Scouting association with 12,500 members. They are affiliated with:
  - EFS-Scouter (Scout Association of the Evangeliska fosterlandsstiftelsen) with 3,000 members
  - Svenska Frälsningsarméns Scouter (Swedish Salvation Army's Scouts) with 140 members
  - Scout groups within the Swedish Church
  - Adventistscouter (Seventh-day Adventist's Scouts) with 250 members; also affiliated to Pathfinders
  - Blåbandsscouter (Scouts of the Blue-Ribbon-Movement—a temperance movement founded by Francis Murphy) with 60 members.
  - Muslim Scout groups.
- Nykterhetsrörelsens Scoutförbund (The Temperance Guide and Scout Association, NSF) was a Scouting organization in Sweden with 5,000 members.
- Frälsningsarméns Scoutförbund, (The Salvation Army Guide and Scout Association, FA Scout) was a Scouting association in Sweden with 1,400 members. On 1 January 2010 FA Scout joined SSF.

The majority of the country's Scout sections are co-educational; only a few remains Boy Scouts/Girl Scouts only.

== Other Groups ==
=== Independent associations ===
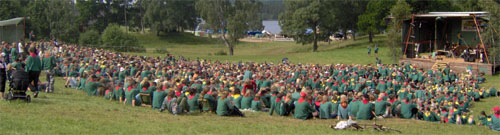
UV-Scout, national jamboree 2005

Independent associations exist and are not members of WOSM or WAGGGS

- Royal Rangers with 1,500 members
- UV-Scout (Scout Association of the Svenska Alliansmissionen) with 6,000 members
- EFK-Scout (also: Nybyggarscout; Scout Association of the Evangeliska Frikyrkan)

=== Older Scouts ===
- St Georgs Scoutgillen i Sverige are members of the International Scout and Guide Fellowship

=== International Scout Units ===
- Armenian Scouting, served by Homenetmen
- Girlguiding UK, served by British Guides in Foreign Countries
- Girl Scouts of the USA, served by USAGSO headquarters
- Hungarian Scouting, served by Külföldi Magyar Cserkészszövetség
- Polish Scouting and Guiding, served by ZHP pgK (ZHP aboard) and NHHP "LS-Kaszuby"
