= Rinkaby =

Village in Skåne County, Sweden

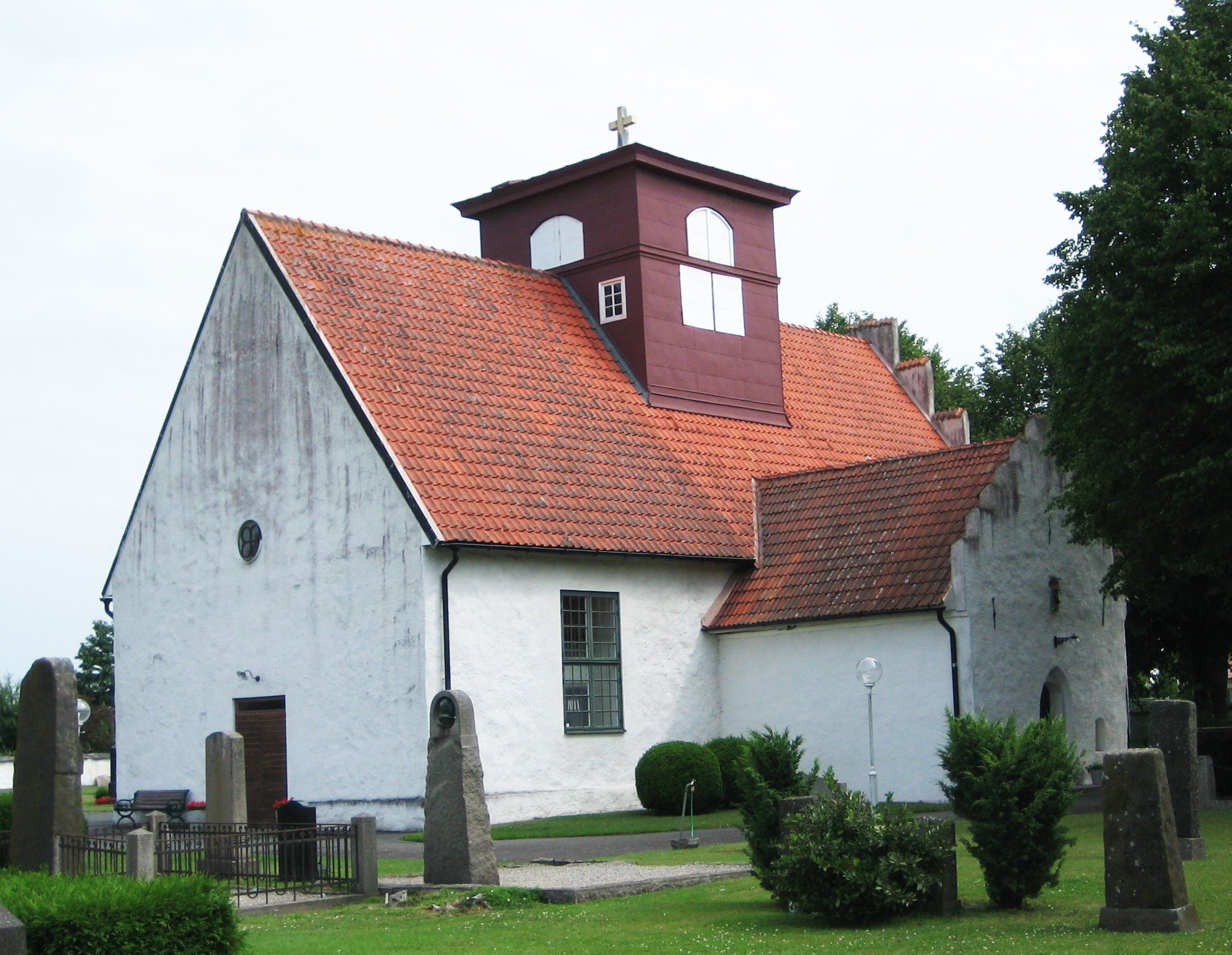
- Rinkaby Church

- Location within Skåne Location within Sweden
- Coordinates: 55°59′N 14°16′E
- Country: Sweden
- Province: Skåne
- County: Skåne County
- Municipality: Kristianstad Municipality

Area
  - Total: 1.11 km^{2} (0.43 sq mi)

Population (31 December 2010)
  - Total: 745
  - Density: 674/km^{2} (1,750/sq mi)
- Time zone: UTC+1 (CET)
  - Summer (DST): UTC+2 (CEST)

Rinkaby is a locality situated in Kristianstad Municipality, Skåne County, Sweden with 745 inhabitants in 2010. It is close to Lake Hammarsjön and roughly halfway between Kristianstad and Åhus. The village has a pre-school and primary school housed in a 19th-century building. There is a leisure centre, a football club and some shops.

== History and geography ==
The area has Stone Age remains; the name of the village is probably derived from the word rinkʀ (Old West Norse rekkr), meaning 'man' or 'warrior', and by denotes a settlement in Old Swedish. Rinkaby Church was built in the 13th century and contains medieval murals and an astronomical clock. It is an agricultural community; in the 19th century, the area was famous for growing tobacco, but now specialises in the rearing of Angus cattle.

Outside the village is a military training area called Rinkabyfältet which is often used for major Scouting events. A national jamboree called "Scout 2001" had 26,500 participants; the 22nd World Scout Jamboree in July–August 2011 was attended by more than 40,000 Scouts, Leaders and adult volunteers participating, from 143 different countries.

== Notable people ==
- Sabina Zweiacker, soprano singer, grew up here.
