= World Scout Education Congress =

Educational event of World Scouting

The World Scout Education Congress is a recurring event that takes place every few years. Its primary focus is education within the Scouting movement. The congress brings together leaders from National Scout Organizations, educators, and partners with the aim of inspiring the development of educational programs and initiatives. The event is organized by the World Organization of the Scout Movement (WOSM).

== 1st World Scout Education Congress ==
The First World Scout Education Congress held in Hong Kong in 2013. In the event 500 participants from more than 100 countries participated. This is the first scout educational congress in the history of scouting. Over 1,000 people also took part in live video sessions via Internet and shared their ideas and questions in the comment section. The main areas of the congress was 21st century life skills, promoting diversity, youth empowerment and inter-connectivity.

Topics discussed at the Congress:

- Leadership
- Scouting's unity and identities
- Values
- Trends in youth and education
- Youth empowerment
- Competencies and skills for life
- The Scout Method
- Reaching out and diversity in scouting
- Learning environments
- Managing our adult resources

== List of the World Scout Education Congress ==
Year	Name	Country	City	Dates	Theme
2013	1st World Scout Education Congress	Hong Kong	Hong Kong	22–24 November 2013	Scouting: Education for Life
2017	2nd World Scout Education Congress	Switzerland	Kandersteg	11–15 May 2017	Prepared: For a Changing World
2019	3rd World Scout Education Congress	Brazil	Rio de Janeiro	7–10 December 2019	
2023	4th World Scout Education Congress	France	Paris	1–3 December 2023	Reimagine education in Scouting

== See also ==
- Bangladesh Scouts
- Scout Association of Hong Kong
- Asia-Pacific Scout Region (World Organization of the Scout Movement)
- 23rd World Scout Jamboree
