= Turpie Rock =

Geographical feature in Antarctica

Coordinates: 54°7′S 36°39′W

Turpie Rock is a rock 1 m high, lying in the entrance to Hercules Bay off the north coast of South Georgia. Positioned by the SGS in the period 1951–57, and named by the United Kingdom Antarctic Place-Names Committee (UK-APC) for the Turpie, which was for many years used by the South Georgia Whaling Co. as a hulk at Leith Harbor and is now sunk there.
