= Equmenia =

Swedish Christian youth organization

equmenia
- Founded: November 17, 2007
- Type: Christian youth organization
- Purpose: Christianity, children's rights, democracy
- Location: Tegnérgatan 8, Stockholm, Sweden
- Origins: SMU, SBUF, and MKU
- Region served: Sweden
- Method: Scouting, music, athletics, youth and child activities
- Members: 39,000
- Key people: Carin Dernulf (Secretary General); Johan Nilsson (Chairman of the Board)
- Employees: 14
- Website: www.equmenia.se

Equmenia, officially written equmenia, is a Swedish Christian youth organization founded in 2007 as a merger of the three previous organization Mission Covenant Youth of Sweden (SMU), Baptist Union Youth of Sweden (SBUF), and United Methodist Church Youth of Sweden (MKU). Equmenia has approximately 39,000 members, which makes it one of the largest youth organizations in the country. 18,000 of these are members of Svenska Missionskyrkans Ungdom Scout (SMU-scout), the second largest Guide and Scout organization in Sweden, outnumbered only by the Swedish Guide and Scout Association. Equmenia is, through SMU-scout, one of five members of the umbrella organization Svenska Scoutrådet, which is a member of World Organization of the Scout Movement and World Association of Girl Guides and Girl Scouts.

Equmenia is the youth organization affiliated with Equmeniakyrkan, former Mission Covenant Church of Sweden, the Baptist Union of Sweden, and the United Methodist Church of Sweden.

== Name and logo ==
The name equmenia stems from the word ekumenik (English: ecumenism) and the abbreviation EQ, emotional intelligence. The logo of the organization takes the form of a cross to denote the Christian connection of Equmenia. The name is supposed to be spelled in only lowercase letters.

== See also ==
- Svenska Missionskyrkans Ungdom Scout
- Mission Covenant Church of Sweden
- Baptist Union of Sweden
