= John R. Phillpot =

Bahamian scout commissioner

International Commissioner of the Scout Association of the Bahamas

John R. Phillpot served as the International Commissioner of the Scout Association of the Bahamas.

== Background ==
In 1986, Phillpot was awarded the 187th Bronze Wolf, the only distinction of the World Organization of the Scout Movement, awarded by the World Scout Committee for exceptional services to world Scouting. He was also a recipient of the Silver World Award.
