= Scouterna =

National Scouting and Guiding organisation of Sweden

- Scouterna - the Guides and Scouts of Sweden
- Headquarters: Instrumentvägen 19
- Location: Stockholm
- Country: Sweden
- Founded: 1 January 2012
- Membership: 70,000
- Chairperson: Ida Texell
- Chairperson: Viktor Lundqvist
- Secretary General: Anna-Karin Hennig
- Affiliation: World Association of Girl Guides and Girl Scouts, World Organization of the Scout Movement
- Website http://www.scouterna.se

Scouterna - the Guides and Scouts of Sweden (Swedish for the Scouts) is the national Scouting and Guiding organisation of Sweden. The organisation was formed in 2012 by a restructuring of the Svenska Scoutförbundet and accepted as the successor of the Svenska Scoutrådet by the World Association of Girl Guides and Girl Scouts and the World Organization of the Scout Movement in 2013. The co-educational organisation has about 70,000 members.

== History ==
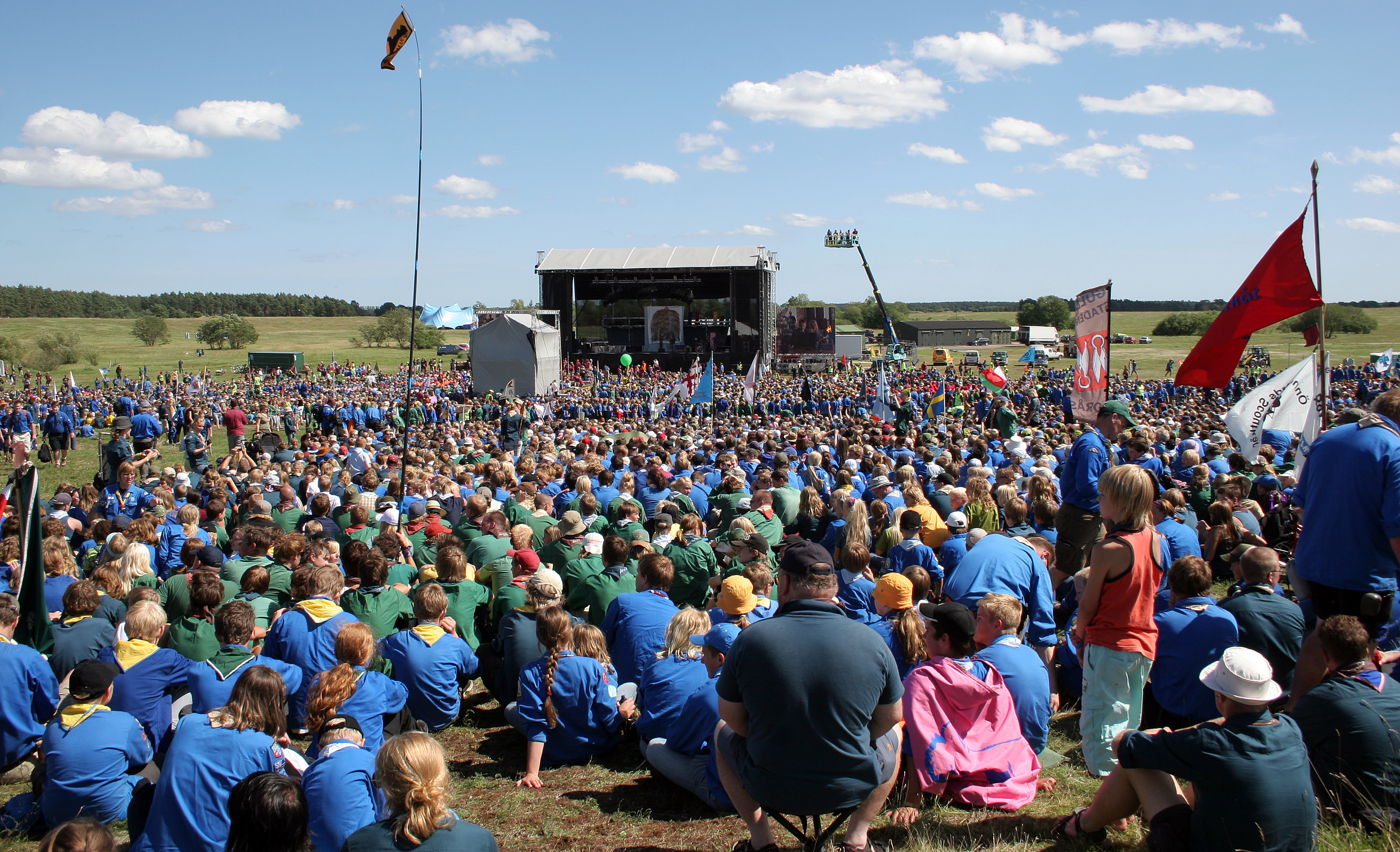
The national jamboree Jiingijamborii in 2007 was an important step towards the unification of Scouting and Guiding in Sweden.

The first Swedish organisations for Boy Scouts were founded in 1911 and 1912 and for Girl Guides in 1913. The movement developed mainly in two distinct branches: Non-religious units were organised in Sveriges Scoutförbundet (for boys) and Sveriges Flickors Scoutförbund (for girls) and Protestant units formed the KFUM:s Scoutförbund (YMCA Scouts for boys) and the Sveriges KFUK:s Scoutförbund (YWCA Guides for girls). Scouting and Guiding existed also within temperance organisations like the IOGT and the NTO.

In 1930, the Sveriges Scoutförbund and the KFUM:s Scoutförbund founded the Svenska Scoutunionen (Swedish Scout Union) as an umbrella organisation aiming at the external representation of Swedish Scouting and at the harmonisation of the Scout programme. The Girl Guides followed in 1931 with the foundation of Sveriges Flickscoutråd (Girl Guide Council of Sweden).

In the 1960s, Swedish Scouting and Guiding became co-educational. Sveriges Scoutförbundet and Sveriges Flickors Scoutförbund merged into Svenska Scoutförbundet in 1960, and KFUM:s Scoutförbund and Sveriges KFUK:s Scoutförbund formed the KFUK-KFUMs Scoutförbund in 1966. In 1968, this was followed by the merger of both national bodies into the Svenska Scoutrådet.

Started by a grassroots' movement within the then five member associations of the Svenska Scoutrådet, the unification of the Swedish Scout and Guide movement was discussed since the mid-1990s. Important steps towards this goal were the national jamborees in 2001 and 2007 as well as the introduction of a common Scout uniform in 2007. In 2010 and 2011, the general meetings of all five associations voted for the unification. The Svenska Scoutförbundet was renamed to Scouterna in 2012. The Frälsningsarméns Scoutförbund and the KFUK-KFUMs Scoutförbund were fully integrated into Scouterna, and Nykterhetsrörelsens Scoutförbund and SMU Scout partly.

== Structure ==
The current structure of Scouterna – the Guides and Scouts of Sweden reflects the historical development of Scouting and Guiding in Sweden, which originally consisted of several distinct organisations, many of them sponsored by religious institutions. Scouterna seeks to unite these movements into a single national organisation while maintaining the traditional ties between local Scout groups and their sponsoring bodies.

All local units are equally represented in the national assembly, Scouternas stämma, but their degree of integration and the form of organisational support vary.

About two-thirds of the approximately 1,100 local Scout groups are directly affiliated with the national organisation and served by Scouterna’s regional structure. These include the former Svenska Scoutförbundet units, as well as all units previously part of the Frälsningsarméns Scoutförbund and the KFUK-KFUMs Scoutförbund. The latter two organisations continue to exist legally but are now fully integrated into Scouterna and no longer conduct independent activities.

The remaining groups belong to three so-called samverkansorganisationer (co-operating organisations): the Nykterhetsrörelsens Scoutförbund (temperance movement), Equmeniascout (formerly SMU Scout of the Equmenia Church), and SALT Scout (the Scouting organisation of the Swedish Evangelical Mission). These co-operating organisations maintain their own internal administrative structures but follow Scouterna’s national programme and share its uniform, values, and representation.

---

== Organisational framework ==
Scouterna operates on several interconnected levels that together form a unified national movement.

=== National level ===
The national level includes:

- the National Board and central office, responsible for leadership, training, programme development, and international representation;
- the National General Assembly (Scouternas stämma), where all local groups, both integrated and co-operating, are represented.

=== Integrated units (≈ two-thirds of all groups) ===
Roughly two-thirds of the Scout groups are directly integrated into Scouterna’s organisational framework. They are structured into two geographical tiers:

1. Regions (regioner) – based on Sweden’s 21 administrative counties (län) such as Västra Götaland, Stockholm, or Norrbotten.
2. Scout districts (Scoutdistrikt) – local federations within each region that support and coordinate the local groups (Scoutkårer).

Example:

Scouterna (National)
 └── Region Västra
      └── Skaraborgs Scoutdistrikt
           └── Active Scout (local group)

=== Co-operating organisations (≈ one-third of all groups) ===
The remaining groups belong to one of three co-operating organisations (samverkansorganisationer) that retain their own governance structures while adhering to Scouterna’s national programme and educational goals.

Co-operating organisation	Background / affiliation	Example of local group
Equmeniascout	Equmenia youth movement (formerly SMU Scout) of the Equmenia Church	Abrahamsbergskyrkans Ungdom
Nykterhetsrörelsens Scoutförbund (NSF)	IOGT-NTO temperance movement	Alanwar Scoutkår
SALT Scout	Swedish Evangelical Mission	Various local SALT Scout groups

These organisations are not attached to Scouterna’s regional or district structure, but are directly connected to the national level.

Example:

Scouterna (National)
 └── Equmeniascout
      └── Abrahamsbergskyrkans Ungdom (local group)

=== Representation and unity ===
All local Scout groups — whether integrated or part of co-operating organisations — are represented in the Scouternas stämma (National Assembly). They all follow the same national programme, educational method, and uniform, ensuring a unified Scouting identity across Sweden.

=== Summary diagram ===
WOSM / WAGGGS (World level)
 └── Scouterna – The Guides and Scouts of Sweden (National level)
      ├── Regions (based on 21 counties)
      │    └── Scout Districts
      │         └── Local integrated groups (≈ 2/3)
      └── Co-operating Organisations (≈ 1/3)
           ├── Equmeniascout
           │    └── Local groups
           ├── Nykterhetsrörelsens Scoutförbund (NSF)
           │    └── Local groups
           └── SALT Scout
                └── Local groups

=== Key points ===
- Integrated groups belong to regional and district structures.
- Co-operating organisations maintain independent internal governance.
- All groups share Scouterna’s national programme, uniform, and representation within the National Assembly.

== Programme ==
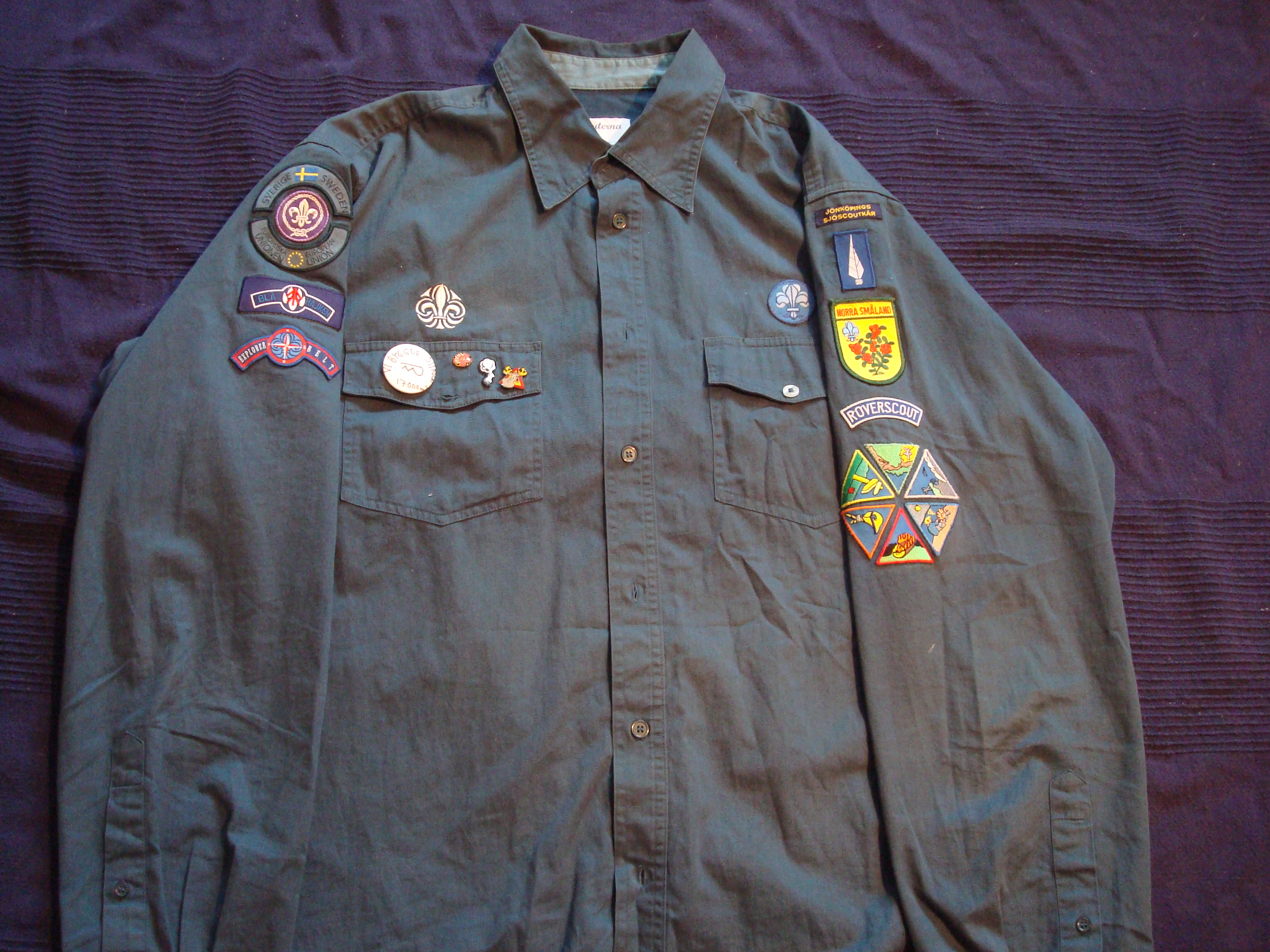
The current uniform of Scouterna was introduced in 2007.

=== Age groups ===
Scouterna is divided in five age groups. Most local units cater for all age groups; some districts organise the Rover Scouts in separate regional units.

- Spårarscout (Tracker Scout) — ages 8 to 10
- Upptäckarscout (Discoverer Scout) — ages 10 to 12
- Äventyrsscout (Adventurer Scout) — ages 12 to 15
- Utmanarscout (Challenger Scout) — ages 15 to 18
- Roverscout (Rover Scout) — ages 19 to 25

=== Ideals ===
All age groups use the same Scout promise:

Jag lovar att efter bästa förmåga följa scoutlagen. — I promise to do my best in following the Scout Law.

The Scout law was formulated in 1970 for all member organisations of the then Svenska Scoutrådet:

En scout söker sin tro och respekterar andras. — A Scout seeks her/his faith and respects the faith of others.
En scout är ärlig och pålitlig. — A Scout is honest and reliable.
En scout är vänlig och hjälpsam. — A Scout is friendly and helpful.
En scout visar hänsyn och är en god kamrat. — A Scout is considerate to others and trustworthy as a friend.
En scout möter svårigheter med gott humör. — A Scout faces difficulties without complaining.
En scout lär känna och vårdar naturen. — A Scout learns about nature and is concerned with its conservation.
En scout känner ansvar för sig själv och andra. — A Scout feels responsibility for her/himself and others.

The Scout motto is Var redo! - Alltid redo! — Be Prepared! - Always Prepared!

=== Sea Scouts ===
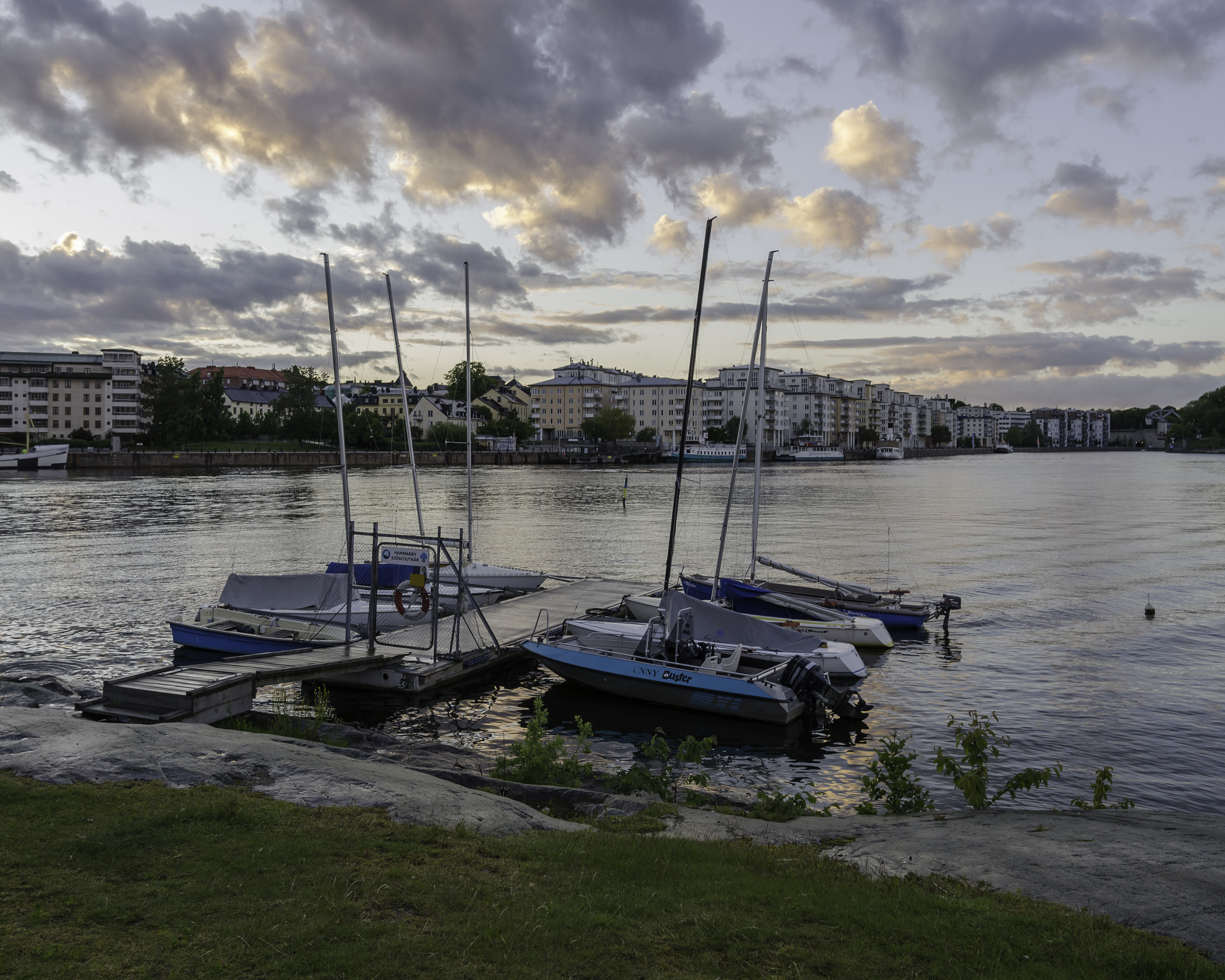
The jetty of Hammarby Sjöscoutkår in Hammarby, Stockholm.

Sea Scouting is available to all age groups within Scouterna. About 70 local units with 7,000 members are active in Sea Scouting, mostly along the coastline, especially in the Stockholm archipelago. They are organised in Sveriges sjöscouters riksskeppslag, the national council of Swedish Sea Scouts, a special interest group which coordinates the activities of the Sea Scout units.

=== Awards ===
Adult members can be awarded medals based on years of service. "Scouternas Stora Förtjänstmärke" can be awarded to active leaders for particularly meritorious efforts for the local level. "Ledfyren" can be awarded an active Scout leader under the age of 25 years who created opportunities for young people to develop according to Scouting values. The "Gustaf Adolfs-märket" can be awarded to active leaders for particular meritorious service at least on district level. The highest award in Swedish Scouting is the "Silvervargen" (the Silver Wolf) that can be awarded for extraordinary contributions to Scouting on at least national level.

== Facilities ==
The national headquarters is located in Sweden's capital Stockholm. The organisation runs its own Scout shop and the building also hosts a scouting museum, displaying objects from the history of Swedish scouting.

Scouterna and its local structures run a large number of Scout camps and huts. Internationally known is the island of Vässarö, owned by the Stockholm Scout district. The Campground at Ransbergs Herrgård near Ransäter in Värmland County was acquired by Nykterhetsrörelsens Scoutförbund in 1963; it was the venue of the World Scout Moot in 1996. Kopparbo Scout camp near Söderbärke in Dalarna County can accommodate up to 5,000 Scouts, Hörrs Nygård Scout camp near Sjöbo in Skåne County up to 3,000 and Kragenäs Scout camp near Tanumshede in Västra Götaland County up to 1,000.

Frustunaby is national scout facility owned by Scouterna, given as a gift to the Guides of Sweden in 1925.

The national sailing vessel of Scouterna, Biscaya av Vindalsö, was scheduled to be sold in 2016.
