= World Scout Foundation =

The World Scout Foundation (WSF) is an international, non-profit institution based in Geneva, Switzerland. Its mission is to develop World Scouting by providing financial and other support through the World Organization of the Scout Movement (WOSM). Scouting is the world's leading educational youth Movement empowering 60 million young people and volunteers to be active global citizens and agents of change in their communities.

The World Scout Foundation was established on 14 February 1969, and reorganised into its current form in 1977, under the patronage of His Majesty Carl XVI Gustaf, The King of Sweden, the first Honorary Chairman (1977-2026). In May 2026, HRH Grand Duke Guillaume of Luxembourg became the Honorary Chair. The organisation is headed by the WSF Chairperson, Beat Wenger, and CEO Mark Knippenberg.

The WSF invests capital donations from individuals, foundations, corporations, governments, and members of the Scout Movement. Profits earned from investments are donated to the WOSM. The Foundation also seeks non-capital donations to support specific World Scouting projects, such as the Messengers of Peace initiative.

== World Baden-Powell Fellowship ==
=== Honours Programme ===
All gifts to the Foundation are counted towards the Bade-Powell Fellowship and achieving the eight Circles of the Honours Programme. These include contributions to the World Baden-Powell Fellowship, Annual Appeals, and the Scout Donation Platform. Those who make a financial commitment to Scouting in their Last Will and Testament are also recognised in “The Founder’s Heritage”.

==== Circles of Recognition ====
- The Benefactor Circle honours those who have made gifts of or over USD 25,000.
- The International Circle honours those who have made gifts of or over USD 50,000.
- The Chairman's Circle honours those who have made gifts of or over USD 100,000.
- The Diplomat Circle honours those who have made gifts of or over USD 250,000.
- The Ambassador Circle honours those who have made gifts of or over USD 500,000.
- The Regal Circle honours those who have made gifts of or over USD 1 Million.
- The Regal Circle — Double Crown honours those who have made gifts of or over USD 2.5 Million.
- The Regal Circle — Triple Crown honours those who have made gifts of or over USD 5 Million.

Recognition for the attainment of these Circles of Membership is given on a special occasion, usually by the Honorary Chairman of the World Scout Foundation.

== See also ==
- Messengers of Peace (Scouting)
