= Svenska Scoutrådet =

Defunct council

- Swedish Guide and Scout Council
- Headquarters: Instrumentvägen 19
- Location: Stockholm
- Country: Sweden
- Founded: 1961
- Defunct: 2013

Svenska Scoutrådet (The Swedish Guide and Scout Council, SSR) was, until 2012, the national Scouting and Guiding Federation of Sweden. The council was dissolved in September 2013 after a restructuring process creating the new single national Scout association, Scouterna (The Guides and Scouts of Sweden).

Scouting in Sweden was founded in 1908, and Guiding followed in 1910. The Swedish Boy Scouts were among the charter members of the World Organization of the Scout Movement in 1922; the Girl Guides were among the founders of the World Association of Girl Guides and Girl Scouts in 1928.

== Member organizations ==
The members of the Swedish Scouting Federation were:

- Svenska Scoutförbundet (SSF, The Swedish Guide and Scout Association: interreligious: 40,200 members)
- Svenska Missionskyrkans Ungdom Scout (SMU, The Guide and Scout Organization of the Mission Covenant Youth of Sweden: 10,600 members)
- KFUK-KFUMs Scoutförbund (The Swedish YMCA-YWCA Guide and Scout Association: 9,300 members)
- Nykterhetsrörelsens Scoutförbund (NSF, The Temperance Guide and Scout Association: 6,400 members)
- Frälsningsarméns Scoutförbund (FA, The Salvation Army Guide and Scout Association: 600 members)

Since 2012, all of the member organizations have been incorporated into Scouterna.

== Svenska Scoutförbundet ==
Svenska Scoutförbundet (SSF) (English: The Swedish Guide and Scout Association) founded in 1909, was Sweden's largest Scouting organization with 55,000 members. Their approach to Scouting was interreligious. Headquarters were in Tellusborgsvägen 94, Stockholm.

=== Vässarö ===
Vässarö is a Scout campsite located on the island of Vässarö (sometimes Vässarön or Wessarö) in the archipelago of Öregrund.

Vässarö was long used for farming but was bought in 1936 by sea captain Ragnar Westin, who planned to use it for his retirement. But in 1942, his ship was torpedoed, and he died. In his will, he stated that the island was to be donated to the Scout Group of Stockholm.

In 1956, the first confirmation camp for Boy Scouts was held. The first camp for Girl Guides was in 1966.

== Svenska Missionskyrkans Ungdom Scout ==
Svenska Missionskyrkans Ungdom Scout (SMU), commonly known as "SMU-Scout" was the Guide and Scout Organization of the Mission Covenant Youth of Sweden, and Sweden's second-largest Scouting organization with 18,500 members. Its headquarters were in Stockholm. The organization was co-ed and open to both boys and girls. Since 2007, all duties at the national level within SMU have been transferred to the collaborative organization equmenia.

The members were distributed into 545 local Scout groups (kårer), which in turn are assembled in seven districts. These districts were shared with SMU's mother denomination, the Mission Covenant Church of Sweden.

Since SMU-Scout was an integral part of equmenia, the board of trustees in equmenia delegated the Scouting issues to a Scout Committee to deal with other issues. The remunerated chairman of the board, however, was also the chairman of the Scout Committee. Since 2012, SMU-Scout has been incorporated into Scouterna, Sweden's national Scouting and Guiding organisation. The organization had a campsite called Skräddartorp, Ludvika, which accommodated approximately 1,000 participants.

=== History ===
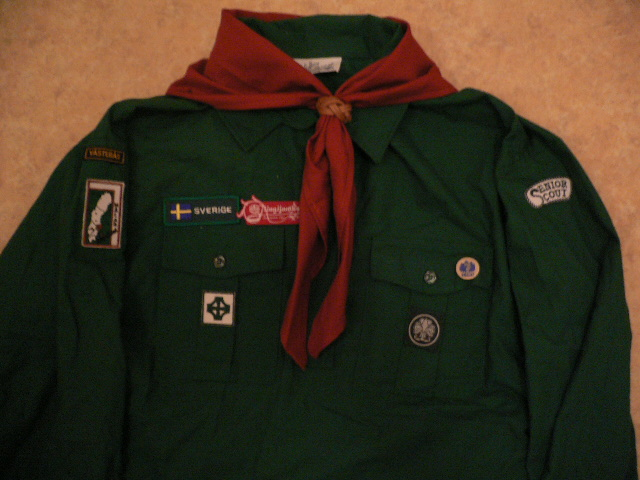
Former uniform of SMU Scout, in use until 2007

The programme for boys (Våra Pojkar) started in 1931 and for girls (Våra Flickor) in 1936. Boys and girls got the same name and programme in 1957, but still in different sections. The sections became co-ed in 1972. Nyingscout started in 1974 and Seniorscout in 1988.

In 1961, SMU-Scout applied for membership in Svenska Scoutrådet, which was granted in 1963.

== KFUK-KFUMs Scoutförbund ==
KFUK-KFUMs Scoutförbund (The Swedish YMCA-YWCA Guide and Scout Association) was Sweden's third largest Scouting association with 12,500 members. The headquarters were in Stockholm.

Scouternas almanacka was a wall almanac sold annually by KFUK-KFUMs Scoutförbund, starting in 1945. Each month is represented by a season-related nature illustration. While most illustrations depict children, some others depict anthropomorphic animals. For many years, Kerstin Frykstrand was famous for the illustrations.

== Nykterhetsrörelsens Scoutförbund ==
Nykterhetsrörelsens Scoutförbund (The Temperance Guide and Scout Association, NSF) was a Scouting organization in Sweden with 6,000 members. It was founded in 1926 and headquartered in Stockholm.

== Frälsningsarméns Scoutförbund ==
Frälsningsarméns Scoutförbund, (The Salvation Army Guide and Scout Association, FA Scout) was a Scouting association in Sweden with 600 members. It was founded in 1912, and headquartered in Stockholm. From 2010 it functioned as an "ideological district" within Svenska Scoutförbundet.

== See also ==
- equmenia
