= World Scout Jamboree =

Large-scale youth event which occurs every four years

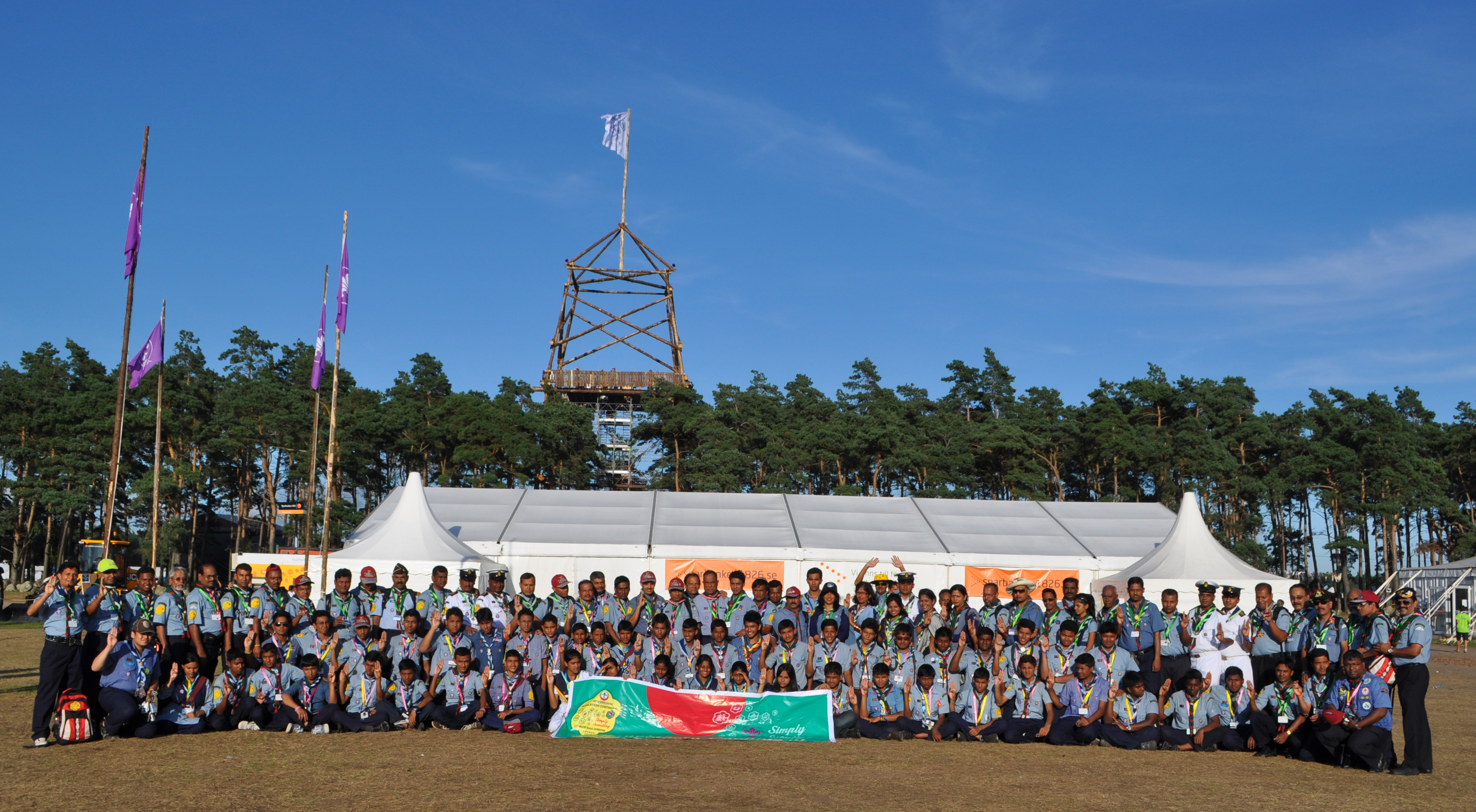
- Scouts at the 22nd World Scout Jamboree in Rinkaby, Sweden (2011)
- Owner: World Organization of the Scout Movement
- Date: 1920

The World Scout Jamboree is a Scouting jamboree of the World Organization of the Scout Movement, typically attended by several tens of thousands of Scouts from around the world, aged 14 to 17. At the jamboree, many scouts swap badges or neckerchiefs.

The first World Scout Jamboree was organized by The Scout Association in London. With exceptions for the World War years and the Iranian Revolution, it has been organized approximately every four years, and in the more recent years has been organised by the World Organization of the Scout Movement (WOSM), in different locations over the world. The 25th World Scout Jamboree was held in South Korea in 2023.

In lexicography, "Jamboree" is considered an Americanism that traces back to 1860–65 and refers to a joyful, noisy gathering. The term is believed to originate from the words jabber (rapid, indistinct talk) and shivaree (noisy celebration), with "m" from jam (crowd).

== History ==
While World Scout Jamboree is the expression used by the World Organization of the Scout Movement, other organizations held events called "jamborees" for their members.

The Scouting program became an international success following its founding by Robert Baden-Powell in 1907. With its continuing growth, the founder of the movement saw a need for a gathering of representatives of Scouting from all around the world. The general aim was to foster a worldwide brotherhood, and to help the young Scouts in the movement learn about other peoples and nations by direct interaction with them.

The idea of organizing such periodical international gatherings was originally conveyed to Baden-Powell by the General Chief of the Scouts of Greece, Konstantinos ("Kokos") Melas, during the 1918 international Scout meeting, in England. Captain Melas proposed the gatherings should repeat every four years, in the same way Olympic Games were held in Ancient Greece. The suggestion was accepted with enthusiasm by Baden-Powell, who named the gatherings "Jamborees".

It was in 1920 that the first World Scout Jamboree was realized, held in the Olympia halls in Kensington, London. Symbolically, the Jamboree site bore the name of the birthplace of the Olympic Games, Olympia. 8,000 Scouts from 34 countries attended the event.

Cartoon in Punch, published in 1929 for the 3rd World Scout Jamboree

Thereafter, a Jamboree has been held every four years. There are two exceptions to this: no Jamboree was held between 1937 and 1947 because of the Second World War, and the 1979 Jamboree, which was to be held in Iran, was cancelled due to the political upheaval in the region at that time. The Jamboree has been held in different countries around the world. The first seven Jamborees were held in Europe. The eighth World Jamboree was held in North America where the tradition of moving the Jamboree among the continents began. As yet, Africa has not hosted a jamboree.

To replace the cancelled event of 1979, the World Scout Committee determined that an alternative celebration, the World Jamboree Year should take place. Several regional camps took place, such as the 12th Australian/4th Asia-Pacific Jamboree, held in Perth, Western Australia, along with countless Join-in-Jamboree activities — designed to allow Scouts from around the world to participate in an activity that thousands of other Scouts around the world were also participating in at the same time. This Join-in programme was reproduced again as part of the Scouting 2007 Centenary celebrations.

The greatest attendance of all Jamborees was in 1929, where over 50,000 members experienced a Jamboree in Arrowe Park, UK. This number represented the number of scouts present at the opening ceremony. As it was usual at the time, some scout troops arrived later and some other left before the end of the camp.

The first Jamboree was more akin to an exhibition of Scouting, allowing visitors to see how things were done in other parts of the world. The Second Jamboree was conducted on a camp basis and each successive Jamboree has developed on this format where the programme is typically more activity oriented, with plenty of time for Scouts from different nations to interact and learn about each other in less formal ways than an exhibition would allow.

The 16th World Scout Jamboree went to the Southern Hemisphere for the first time, in Sydney, NSW, Australia.

The 21st World Scout Jamboree in 2007 was held in Hylands Park, Essex, United Kingdom, and celebrated the Centenary of Scouting. Because of this, the honour of hosting the event was again bestowed upon the United Kingdom, as the birthplace of Scouting. Over 40,000 young people camped in August at Hylands Park in Chelmsford, Essex. Hundreds of thousands of day visitors attended events in the south-east of England as part of the Jamboree.

The 22nd World Scout Jamboree was at Rinkaby, Sweden from 27 July to 8 August 2011; the 23rd World Scout Jamboree was at Kirara-hama, Yamaguchi City, Japan from 28 July to 8 August 2015; the 24th World Scout Jamboree was at The Summit Bechtel Family National Scout Reserve in West Virginia, United States, from 22 July to 2 August 2019.

The 25th World Scout Jamboree was at Saemangeum in South Korea from 2 to 12 August 2023. It was accompanied by great heat from the beginning, several contingents, including British and American, therefore left the camp. On August 7, the Korean government decided to end the jamboree in Saemangeum early and to evacuate the participants to Seoul, the heat wave was to be replaced by a tropical storm. The jamboree program continued in the capital city of Seoul, with participants staying at various locations throughout the city, including military bases and universities. The closing ceremony was held at the Seoul World Cup Stadium, which hosted the 2002 FIFA World Cup.

The 26th World Scout Jamboree will be held in 2027 at Sobieszowo Island near Gdańsk in Poland. The 27th World Scout Jamboree will be held in 2031 at Silkeborg, Denmark.

== Events ==
Year	Event	Location	Host country	Theme/Name	Dates	Attendance	Countries/ regions Attended
1920	1st World Scout Jamboree	London	United Kingdom	Develop World Peace	July 30, 1920– August 8, 1920	8,000	34
1924	2nd World Scout Jamboree	Ermelunden	Denmark	World Citizenship	August 10, 1924– August 17, 1924?	4,549	32
1929	3rd World Scout Jamboree	Arrowe Park, Upton, Birkenhead	United Kingdom	Coming of Age (21st Anniversary of Scouting)	July 31, 1929– August 13, 1929	50,000	69
1933	4th World Scout Jamboree	Gödöllő	Hungary	Face New Adventures	August 2, 1933– August 15, 1933	25,792	33
1937	5th World Scout Jamboree	Bloemendaal	Netherlands	Lead Happy Lives	July 31, 1937– August 9, 1937	28,750	54
1941	(6th World Scout Jamboree)		France	Cancelled due to World War II			
1947	6th World Scout Jamboree	Moisson	France	Jamboree of Peace	August 9, 1947– August 20, 1947	24,152	71
1951	7th World Scout Jamboree	Bad Ischl	Austria	Jamboree of Simplicity	August 3, 1951– August 13, 1951	12,884	61
1955	8th World Scout Jamboree	Niagara-on-the-Lake, Ontario	Canada	New Horizons	August 18, 1955– August 28, 1955	11,139	71
1957	9th World Scout Jamboree	Sutton Park, Warwickshire	United Kingdom	Jubilee Jamboree (50th Anniversary of Scouting)	August 1, 1957– August 12, 1957	31,426	82
1959	10th World Scout Jamboree	Los Baños, Laguna	Philippines	Building Tomorrow Today	July 17, 1959– July 26, 1959	12,203	44
1963	11th World Scout Jamboree	Marathon	Greece	Higher and Wider	August 1, 1963– August 11, 1963	11,398	89
1967	12th World Scout Jamboree	Farragut State Park, Idaho	United States	For Friendship	August 1, 1967– August 9, 1967	12,011	105
1971	13th World Scout Jamboree	Fujinomiya, Shizuoka	Japan	For Understanding	August 2, 1971– August 10, 1971	23,758	87
1975	14th World Scout Jamboree	Lillehammer	Norway (Note: Hosting duties split between Norway, Denmark, Finland, Iceland and Sweden)	Five Fingers, One Hand	July 29, 1975– August 5, 1975	17,259	91
1979	(15th World Scout Jamboree)	Nishapur	Iran		July 15, 1979– July 23, 1979	cancelled	
1983	15th World Scout Jamboree	Kananaskis, Alberta	Canada	The Spirit Lives On	July 5, 1983– July 15, 1983	14,752	106
1987–1988	16th World Scout Jamboree	Sydney	Australia	Bringing the World Together	December 31, 1987– January 7, 1988	14,434	84
1991	17th World Scout Jamboree	Seoraksan National Park, Gangwon	South Korea	Many Lands, One World	August 8, 1991– August 16, 1991	19,083	135
1995	18th World Scout Jamboree	Dronten	Netherlands	Future is Now	August 1, 1995– August 11, 1995	28,960	166
1998–1999	19th World Scout Jamboree	Picarquín	Chile	Building Peace Together	December 27, 1998– January 6, 1999	31,534	157
2002–2003	20th World Scout Jamboree	Sattahip	Thailand	Share our World, Share our Cultures	December 28, 2002– January 8, 2003	24,000	147
2007	21st World Scout Jamboree	Chelmsford, Essex	United Kingdom	One World, One Promise; Scouting Centenary	July 28, 2007– August 8, 2007	37,868	155
2011	22nd World Scout Jamboree	Kristianstad	Sweden	Simply Scouting	July 27, 2011– August 7, 2011	40,061	146
2015	23rd World Scout Jamboree	Kirarahama, Yamaguchi	Japan	A Spirit of Unity	July 28, 2015– August 8, 2015	33,628	155
2019	24th World Scout Jamboree	Glen Jean, West Virginia	United States (Note: Hosting duties split between Boy Scouts of America, Scouts Canada, and Asociación de Scouts de México)	Unlock a New World	July 22, 2019– August 2, 2019	41,559	124
2023	25th World Scout Jamboree	Saemangeum, North Jeolla / Seoul	South Korea	Draw Your Dream	August 1, 2023– August 12, 2023	43,281	158
2027	26th World Scout Jamboree	Gdańsk	Poland	Bravely	July 30, 2027– August 8, 2027		
2031	27th World Scout Jamboree	Silkeborg	Denmark	Amplify Your Impact	July 28, 2031– August 8, 2031		

== Related world-wide events ==
=== Jamboree on the Air ===
Jamboree on the Air, usually referred to as JOTA, is an international Scouting and Guiding activity held annually on the third full weekend in October. The event was first held in conjunction with the fiftieth anniversary of Scouting in 1957, and was devised by radio amateur operator Leslie R. Mitchell who used the callsign G3BHK. It is now considered the largest event organized by the WOSM annually.

Amateur radio operators from all over the world participate with over 500,000 Scouts and Guides to teach them about radio and to assist them to contact their fellow Scouts and Guides by means of amateur radio and since 2004, by the VOIP-based Echolink. Scouts and Guides are also encouraged to send paper or electronic confirmations known as "QSL cards", or "eQSLs" when they are sent electronically. This provides the Scouts and Guides with a means of learning about fellow Scouts and Guides from around the world. It is an adjunct to the World Scout Jamboree.

=== Jamboree on the Internet ===
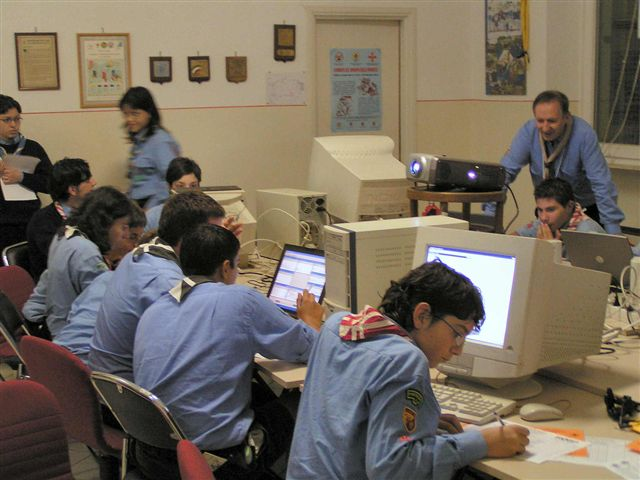
Scouts at their computers during Jamboree on the Internet

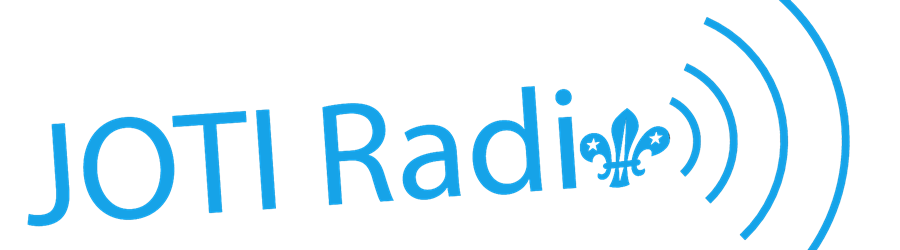

Jamboree on the Internet, known by its acronym JOTI, is an international Scouting activity held annually. Participants, through the use of designated Chats from all over the world, can contact their fellow Scouts by means of the Internet. Common communication methods include ScoutLink (IRC), e-mail, and VOIP. This provides the Scouts with a means of learning about fellow Scouts from around the world. JOTI operates alongside JOTA (Jamboree on the Air) and is an official event of the World Organization of the Scout Movement.

JOTI was pioneered in 1995 by Queanbeyan Rovers whilst one Rover, Norvan Vogt was on a student exchange in the Netherlands, with the home crew in Australia co-ordinated by Brett Sheffield. They connected Putten, Netherlands and Queanbeyan, Australia with dedicated IRC servers. In November 1996 the World Scout Committee, noting that Scouting already had a considerable presence on the Internet, and that there was already an informal and rapidly growing Jamboree on the Internet, decided that JOTI should become an official international Scouting event, and that it should be held on the same weekend as the Jamboree on the Air (JOTA).

2011 saw the first ever 'JOTI Radio' station, a broadcast internet radio station based in the UK to provide entertainment for the JOTI weekend, which had live interviews from Scouts all over the world, the team that lead JOTI Radio are made up of the 'Avon Scout Radio' team, which are a County Active Support Unit for Avon Scouts and provide broadcast radio services within the Scouting Movement worldwide. JOTI Radio is now part of the annual JOTA/JOTI weekend.

=== Jamboree on the Trail ===
Following on the idea of the Join-in events from the World Jamboree Year, Jamboree on the Trail (or JOTT), is a co-ordinated event where Scouts around the world simultaneously participate in local hikes. It takes place on an annual basis on the 2nd Saturday in May.

This type of event allows Scouts to take part in activities at the same time as other Scouts, promoting the idea of the Scouting brotherhood. Participants are awarded a JOTT badge as a recognition of having participated in this worldwide event.

== Smaller events ==
There are up to ten smaller Jamboree (or Jamborette) events held each year around the world. This includes Regional Jamborees, which are held every three years in their areas of the world. Scouts from outside these regions are invited, but attendance is generally lower (for example, the EuroJam 2005 event hosted 10,000 Scouts, mostly from Europe).

National associations, and sub-national groups, also organise a number of events, such as the WINGS event and Essex International Jamboree, which is organised by a County level body.

== Gallery ==
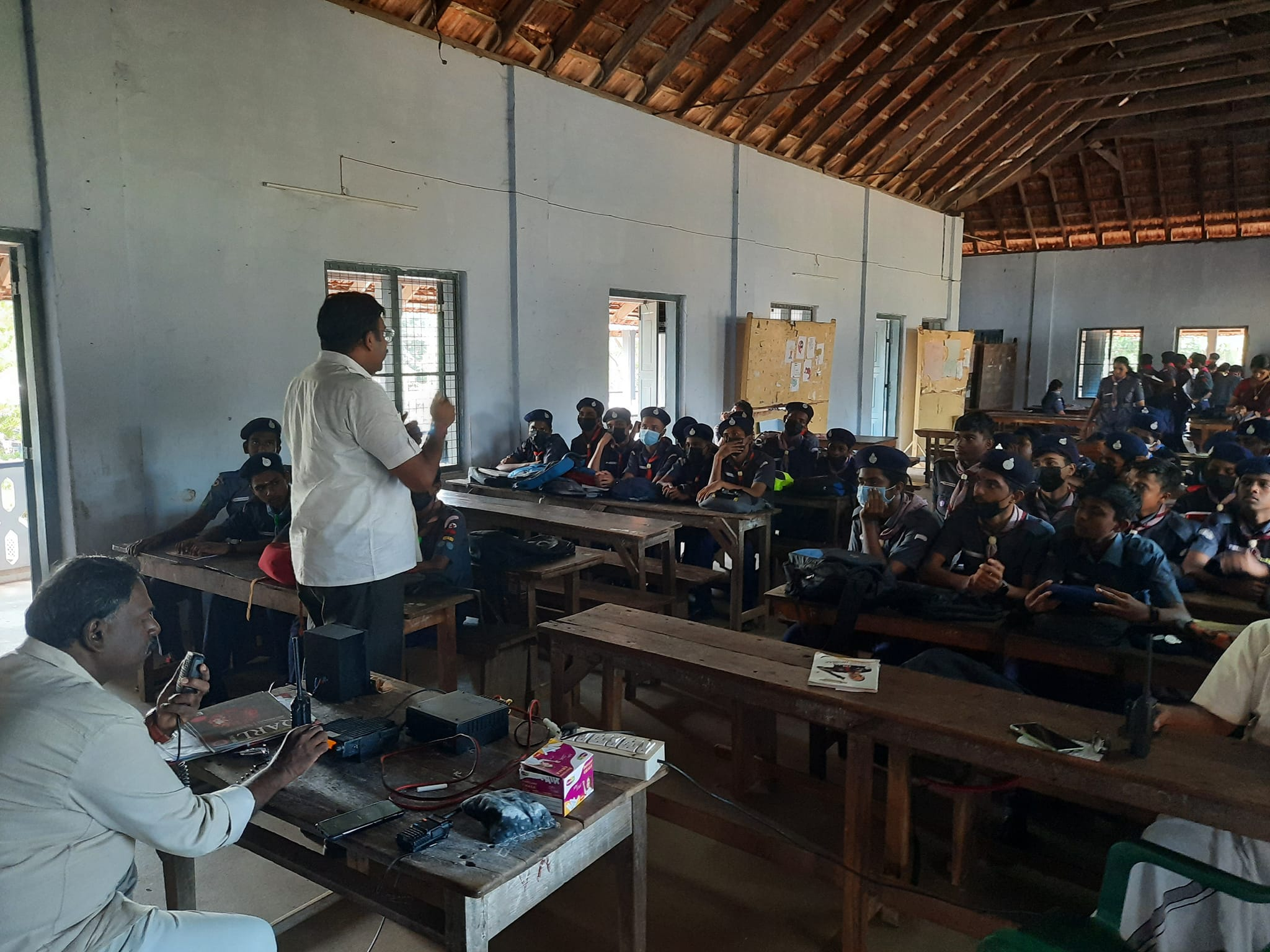
Jota joti programme conducted by Kollam Dist scouts and Quilon Amateur Radio League 2025

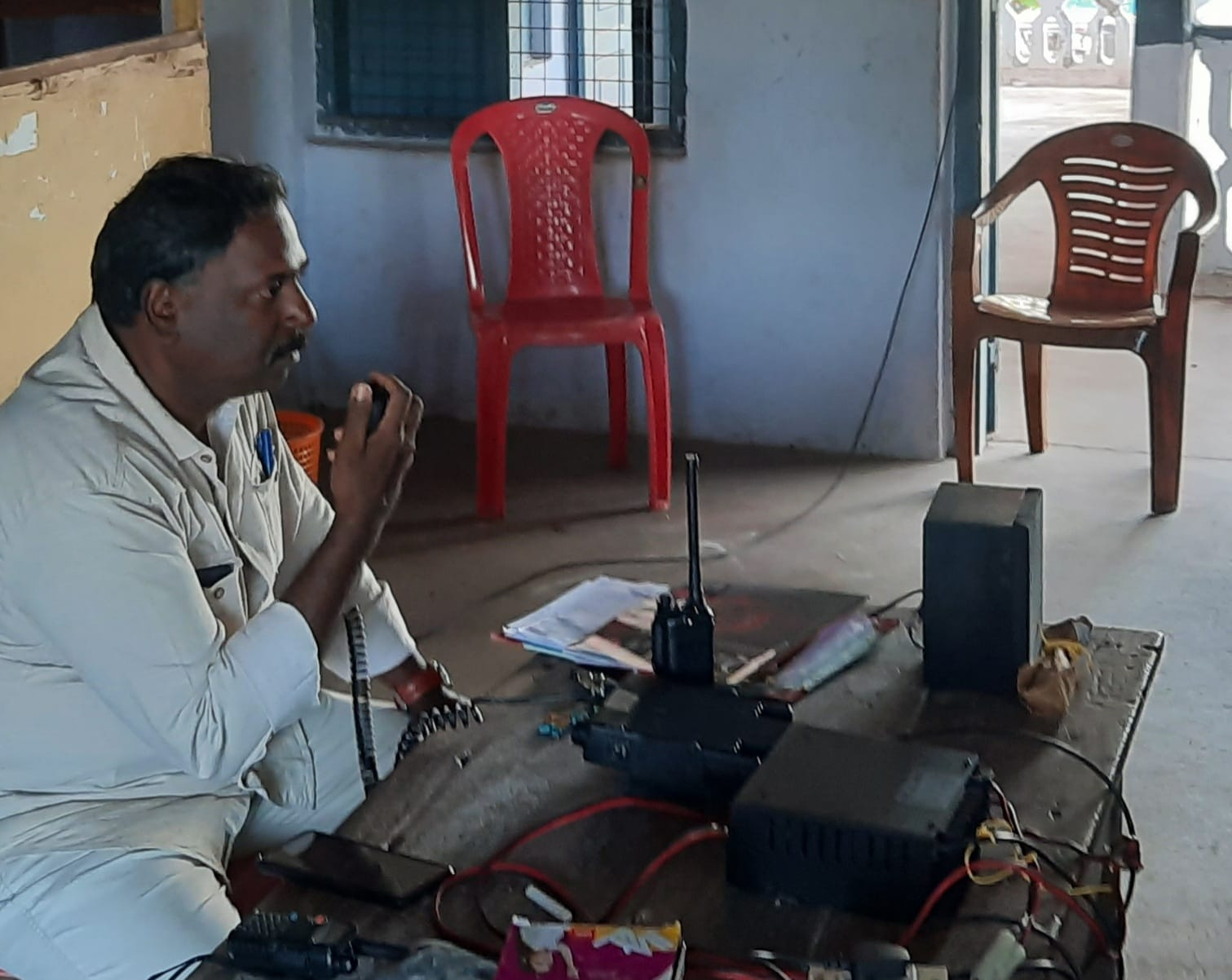
Jota joti programme conducted by Kollam Dist scouts and Quilon Amateur Radio League 2025

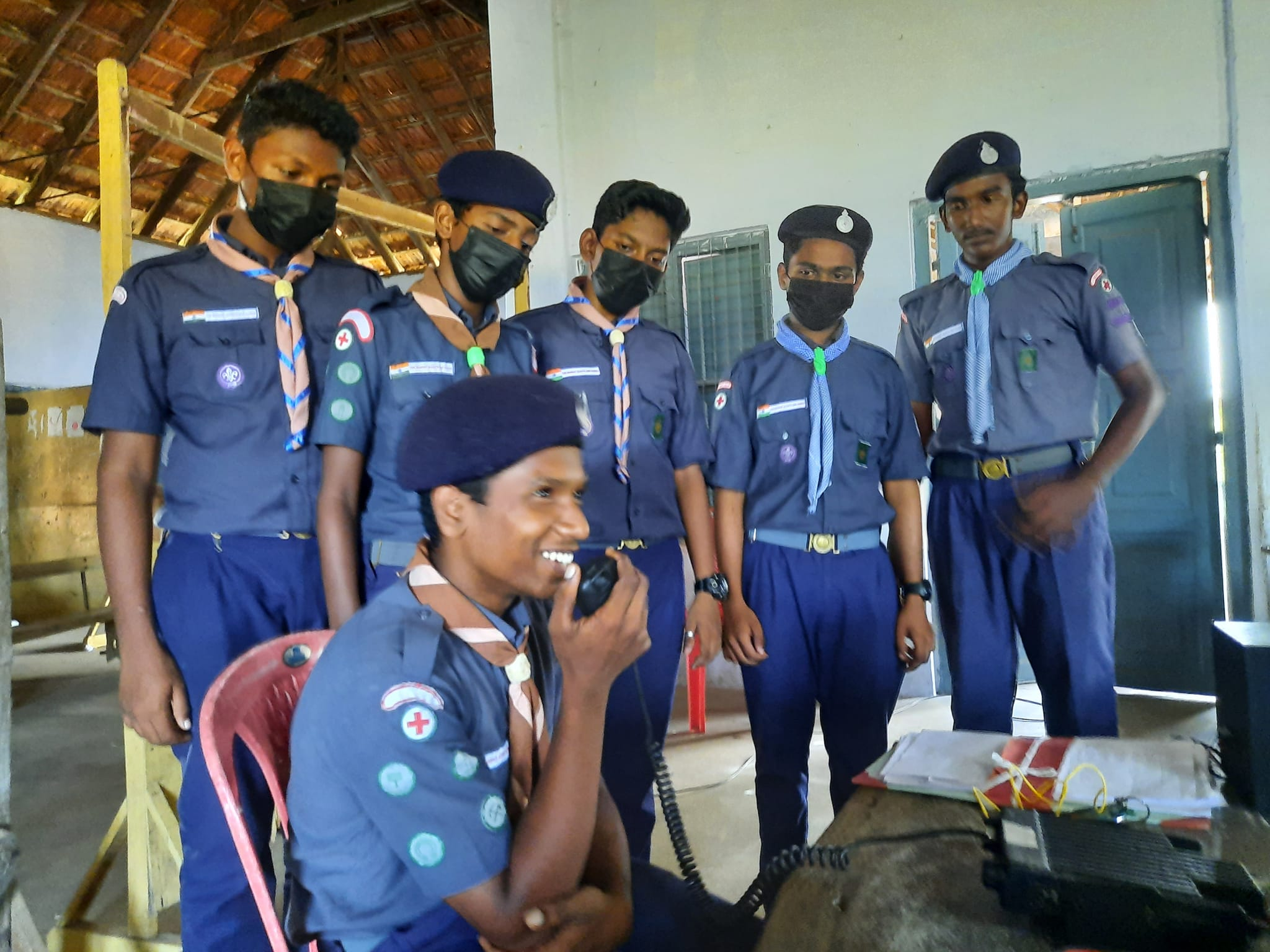
Jota joti programme conducted by Kollam Dist scouts and Quilon Amateur Radio League 2025

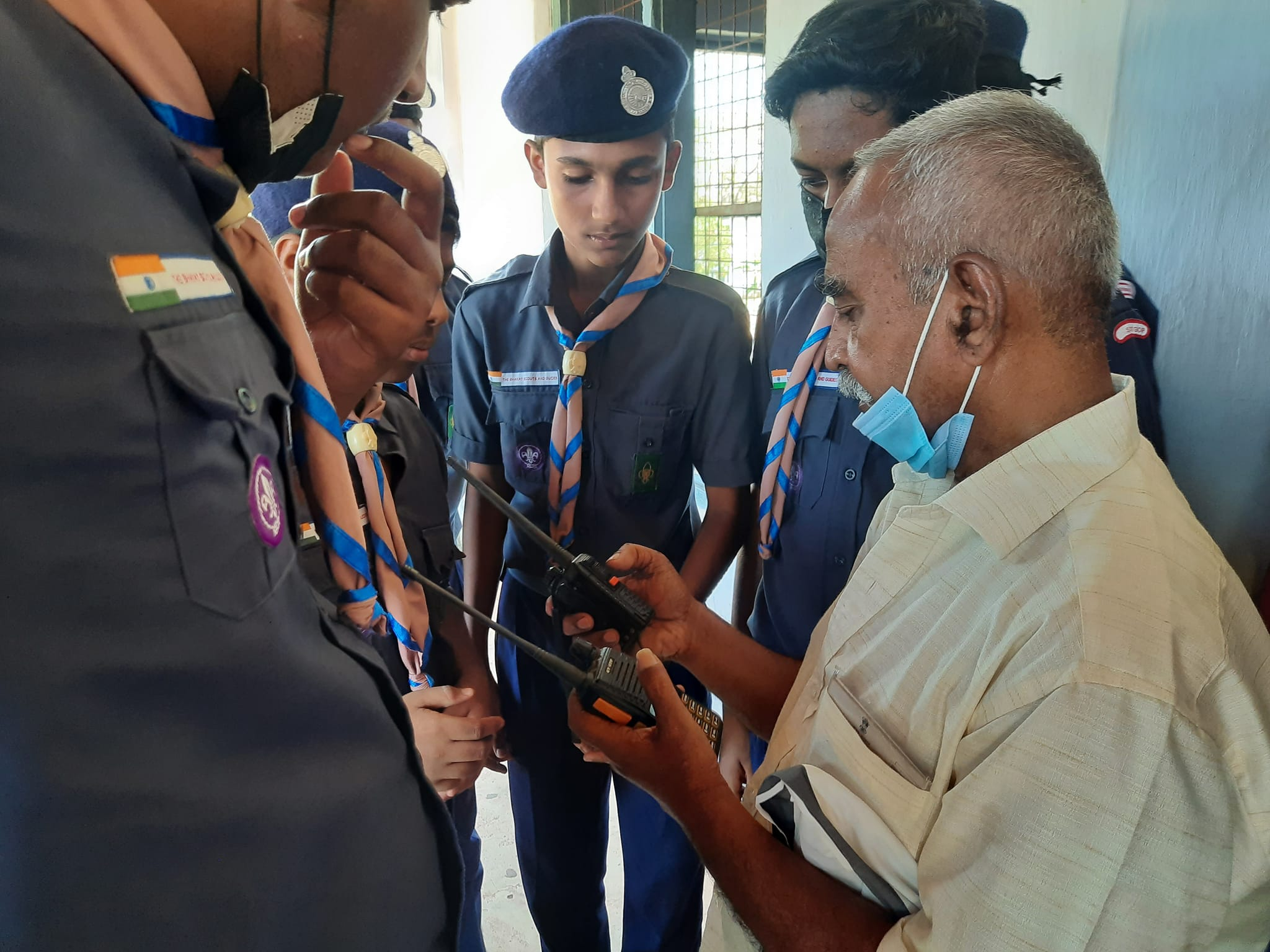

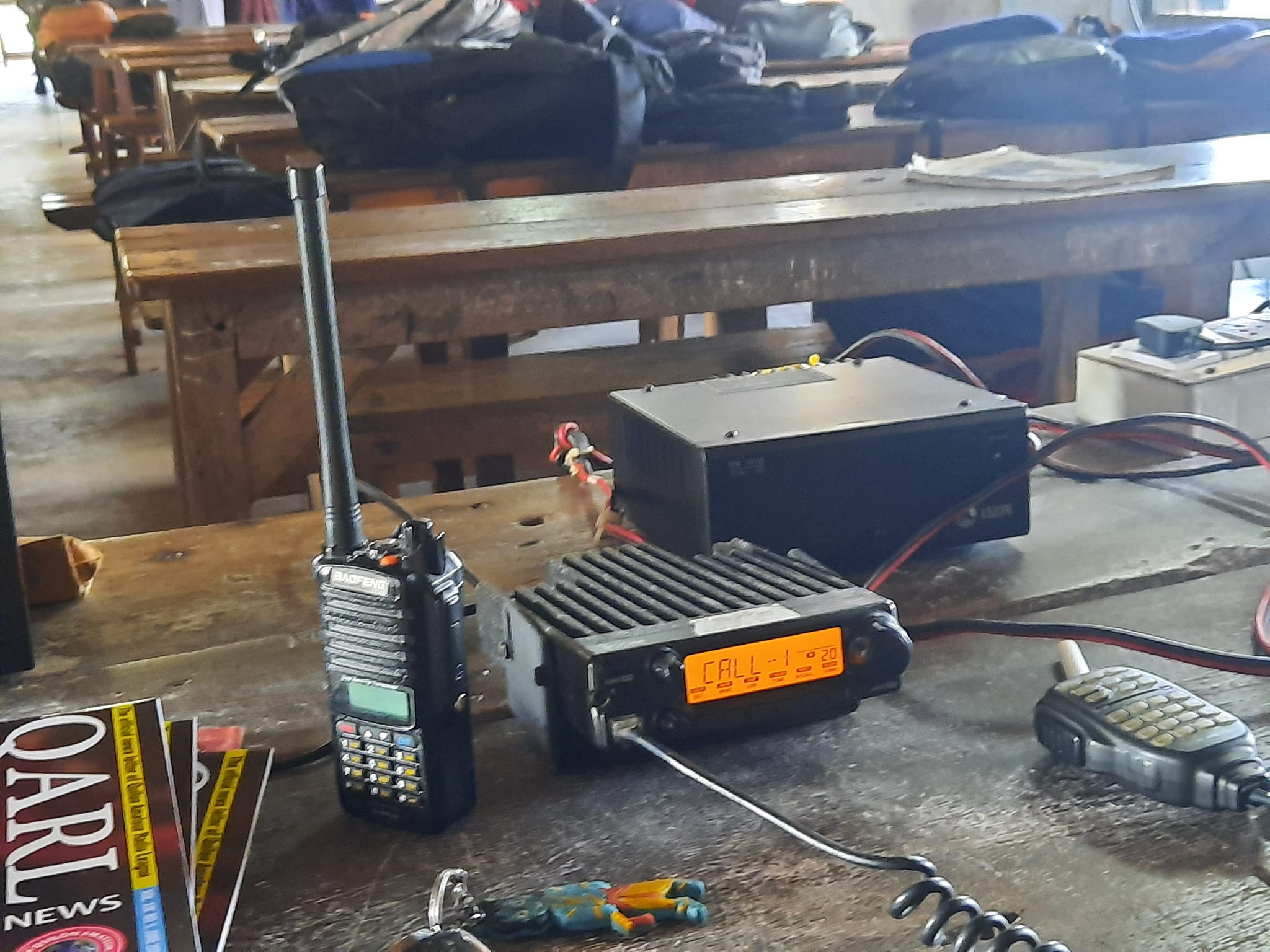

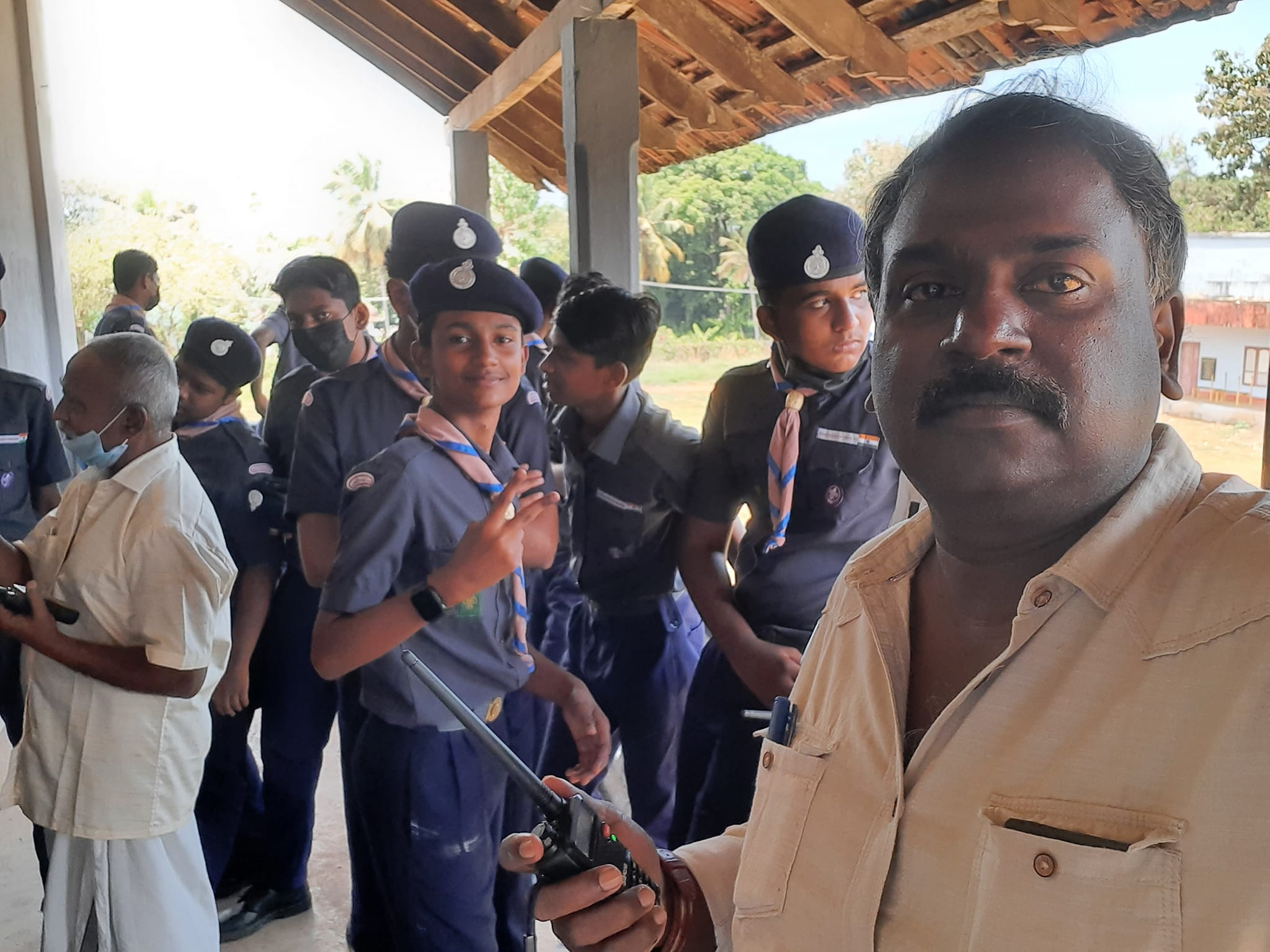

== See also ==
- World Scout Moot
- World Scout Indaba
- World Camp (Guiding)
