= 25th World Scout Jamboree =

2023 event held in South Korea

- Official logo for 25th World Scout Jamboree
- Theme: Draw Your Dream
- Location: Saemangeum, Buan-gun
- Country: South Korea
- Coordinates: 35°42′56″N 126°35′39″E
- Date: 1–12 August 2023
- Camp Chief: Simon Hang-bock Rhee
- Affiliation: World Organization of the Scout Movement
Previous; 24th World Scout Jamboree	Next; 26th World Scout Jamboree
- Website https://www.2023wsjkorea.org/

The 25th World Scout Jamboree was the 25th edition of the World Scout Jamboree, the biggest in-person event of the scout movement, that happens every four years in a different country, held from 1–12 August 2023 at Saemangeum, North Jeolla, South Korea. It was hosted by Korea Scout Association with the theme, "Draw Your Dream". About 43,000 participants from 158 countries attended. The location, Saemangeum, is a reclaimed tidal flat on the coast of the Yellow Sea in South Korea. The campsite is flat, overlooks the sea on one side and features a view of the mountains. The site is about 8.8 square kilometres (3.4 sq mi), 6.2 km × 1.7 km (3.9 mi × 1.1 mi) (based on the longest points).

The purpose of the event is for the participants to participate in cultural exchange activities with other scouts from different parts of the world, such as cooking, setting up camp, leisure activities, culture, spirituality, and others, guided by the educational program.

Planning and execution failures, in conjunction with recent flooding and a heat wave, led to health issues among attendees. A report of the Board of Audit and Inspection of Korea, released on April 10, 2025, "concluded that misleading updates from both the Jamboree organising committee and the Ministry of Gender Equality and Family (Mogef) – the primary supervisory agency – hampered the government's ability to step in and implement urgent corrective actions." "In the week preceding the event, heavy rainfall turned the campsite into a muddy swamp and breeding ground for mosquitoes and flies. (...) Participants complained about poor sanitation, rotten food, a lack of shelter and privacy." South Korean media pointed out that "Scouts from Southeast Asia and Japan would have been used to such summer climate, but they would never have been exposed to the scorching heat wave without air conditioners for so long. Humidity averaged 85 percent from morning to evening around the camping site on the coast. That level of humidity is hardly endurable even for adults if they are forced to use tents without electric fans or air conditioners." Others called for the Government to "give back some 6.5 million won ($5,000) in participating fees to 43,000 scouts. The government could find the money from its budget or 2.6 trillion won spending for the entire Saemangeum project." Several countries removed their large groups of scouts from the campsite and started with preparations for their early return. On August 8, the South Korean government, in cooperation with World Organization of the Scout Movement, finally decided to evacuate the rest of the attendees - about 37'000 scouts from 156 countries - due to Typhoon Khanun. The scouts were placed in university dormitories, that students had been asked to leave, government and corporate training centres, and sometimes hotels. A program of visits to cultural and historic sites and pop music concerts was improvised for the displaced participants in various regions of the country. The closing ceremony, staging a K-Pop-concert, was relocated to a football stadium in Seoul. "South Korean Prime Minister Han Duk-soo, in his closing speech, issued a sincere apology to the attendees: 'First of all, throughout the event, I am sorry that the Scouts suffered from the unprecedented heat wave and typhoon caused by climate change,' Han said." He expressed his appreciation for the bravery and perseverance of the scouts, who had been put through a tough ordeal and said, "he was touched by how they overcame difficulties and took care of one another 'with extraordinary sense of responsibility and selflessness." For their part, the participants noted the friendliness and great helpfulness of the Korean people toward them: "The Korean people have taken extreme responsibility for what happened to us and the other contingents from around the world and have in return treated us with an immense amount of kindness and compassion."

== Bid process ==
Both the ZHP (Polish Scouting and Guiding Association) and Korea Scout Association (KSA) launched bids to host the 25th World Scout Jamboree. The World Organization of the Scout Movement (WOSM) was to have selected the host country in 2014 at the 40th World Scout Conference in Ljubljana, Slovenia, however this was postponed past the 23rd World Scout Jamboree, where both contingents still made bids.

The ZHP's proposed theme, "Be the Spark", received support from the city of Gdańsk to host the jamboree. Mayor Paweł Adamowicz wrote an article for the Huffington Post promoting Gdańsk as an ideal host city.

Korea Scout Association's proposed theme, "Draw Your Dream" and location at Saemangeum, were supported by the Jeollabuk-do Provincial Government and Korea Government's Ministry of Gender Equality and Family. The jamboree would also celebrate the Scouting centenary in Korea, and the legacy of the 17th World Scout Jamboree, held in 1991, in Goseong, Gangwon-do with 19,093 participants from 135 countries under the theme of "Many Lands, One World". Korean President Moon Jae-in and former United Nations Secretary-General Ban Ki-moon actively and publicly promoted KSA's candidacy.

On 16 August 2017, during the 41st World Scout Conference in Baku, Azerbaijan, WOSM announced that the 25th World Scout Jamboree would be held in South Korea.

== Programme ==
=== Opening ceremony ===
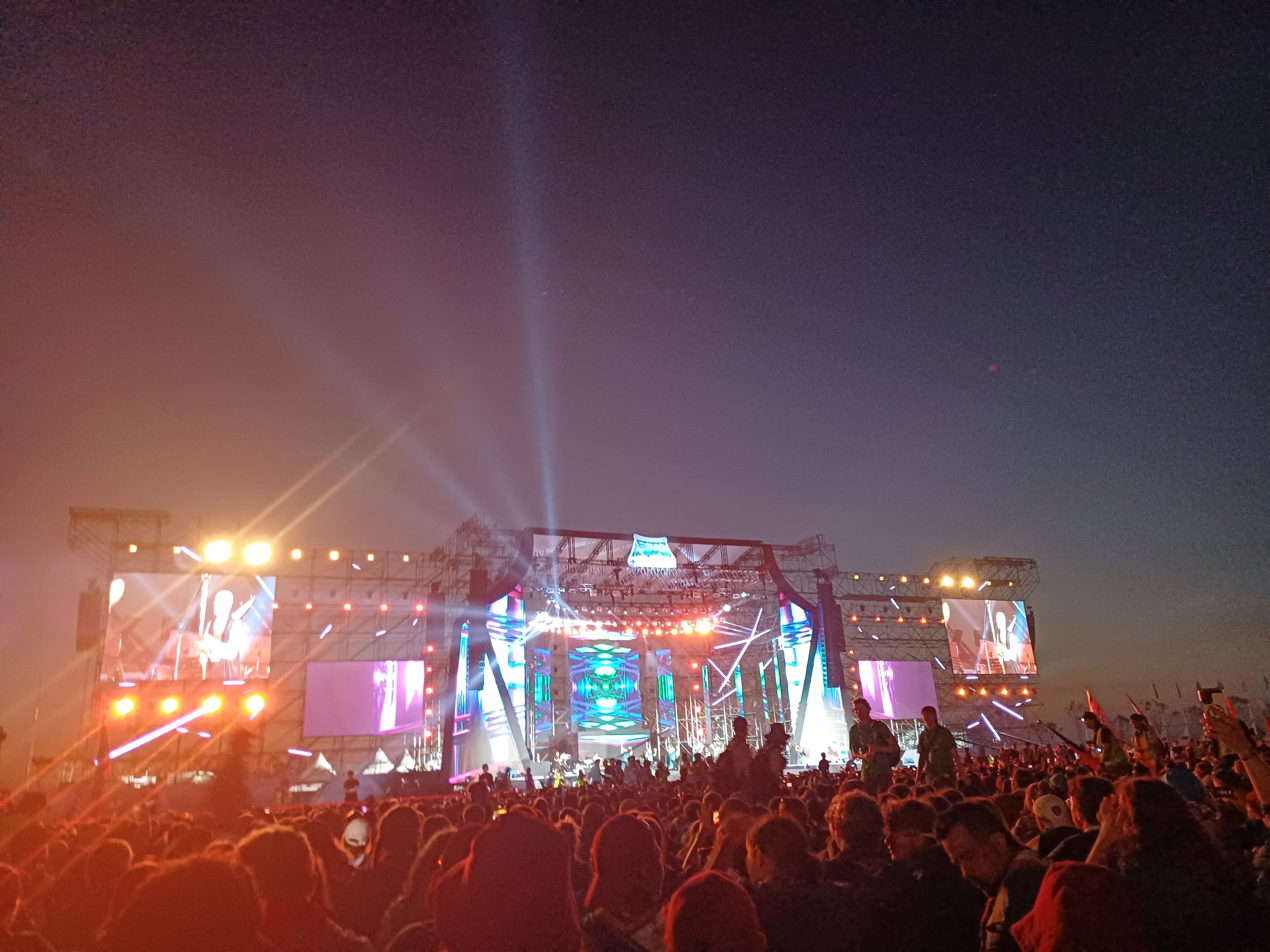
The Jamboree Opening Ceremony at Saemangeum; stage show at with lights and people below

The opening ceremony was held at Saemangeum on the evening of Wednesday 2 August. The main speaker was the President of South Korea, Yoon Suk Yeol with his first lady, Kim Keon-hee, who both wore Scout uniforms. Also speaking was Bear Grylls, the Chief Ambassador of World Scouting. The event included music and a drone light show.

During the opening ceremony, 108 Scouts suffered from heat-related illnesses and exhaustion due to the extreme heatwave and were taken to the hospital that night. Social media profiles of certain Scouts who attended clearly conveyed the poor preparation of the Korean Scout Association. Some parents of the Scouts pointed out the poor management and lack of sufficient infrastructures against the heatwave.

=== Pillars of the jamboree program ===
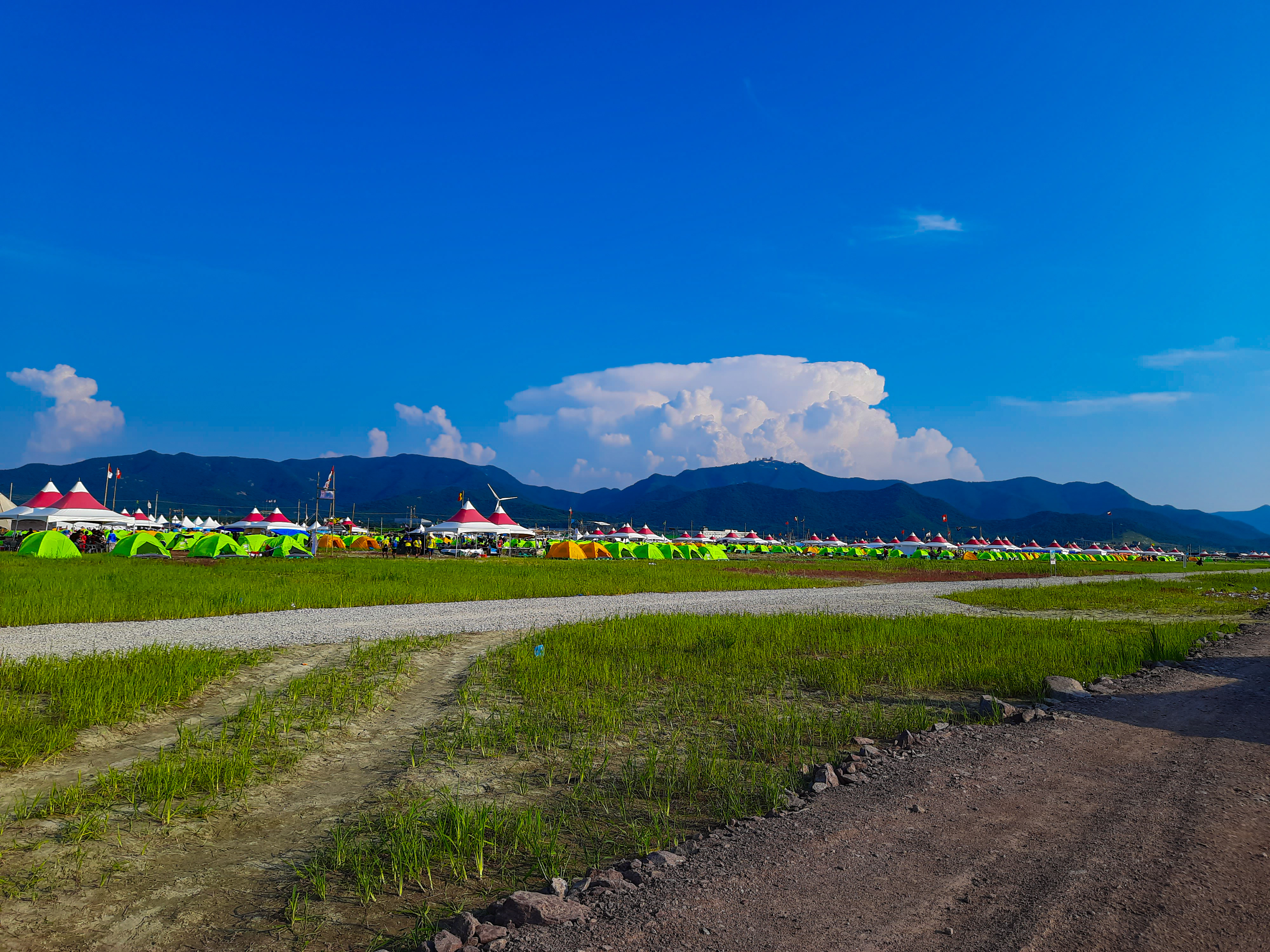
View of part of the Jamboree site.

The jamboree program is composed of five pillars: Scouting for Life, Smart & Scientific, Safe & Secure, Sustainability, and ACT (Adventure, Culture, and Tradition):

1. Scouting for Life: Refers to activities enabling participants to develop leadership and life skills through Scouting activities, challenging their perception about global issues and encouraging them to become active citizens. It incorporates Scouting's values, methods, and current emphasis concerning global citizenship education and sustainable development education.
2. Smart & Scientific: Refers to activities featuring the latest technology, from robotics to virtual reality, including Science, Technology, Engineering and Mathematics (STEM) programs.
3. Safe & Secure: Refers to activities educating and raising awareness to prevent and respond to communicable diseases, natural disasters, and other emergencies. It also showcased Korea Scout Association's diverse safety education programs. These are aimed at improving the ability of participants responding to danger and contributing as responders in emergencies.
4. Sustainability: Refers to activities that educate and raise awareness about the United Nations' Sustainable Development Goals, and methods that allow participants to act as peace messengers. It also promotes sustainable development in the scouts' respective communities. The jamboree featured Better World Tent and Global Development Village, where participants learned about their role and connection with nature, procedures to create a culture of peace and dialogue, promote diversity and inclusion, and more.
5. ACT (Adventure, Culture, Tradition): Refers to various adventurous activities featuring the environment and diverse terrain around Saemangeum, including the mountains and rivers, cross-cultural exchanges to experience the best of Korean culture and tradition from K-pop music to Bibimbap food to the Hangul alphabet and others.

== Criticism and failures ==
=== Infrastructure problems ===
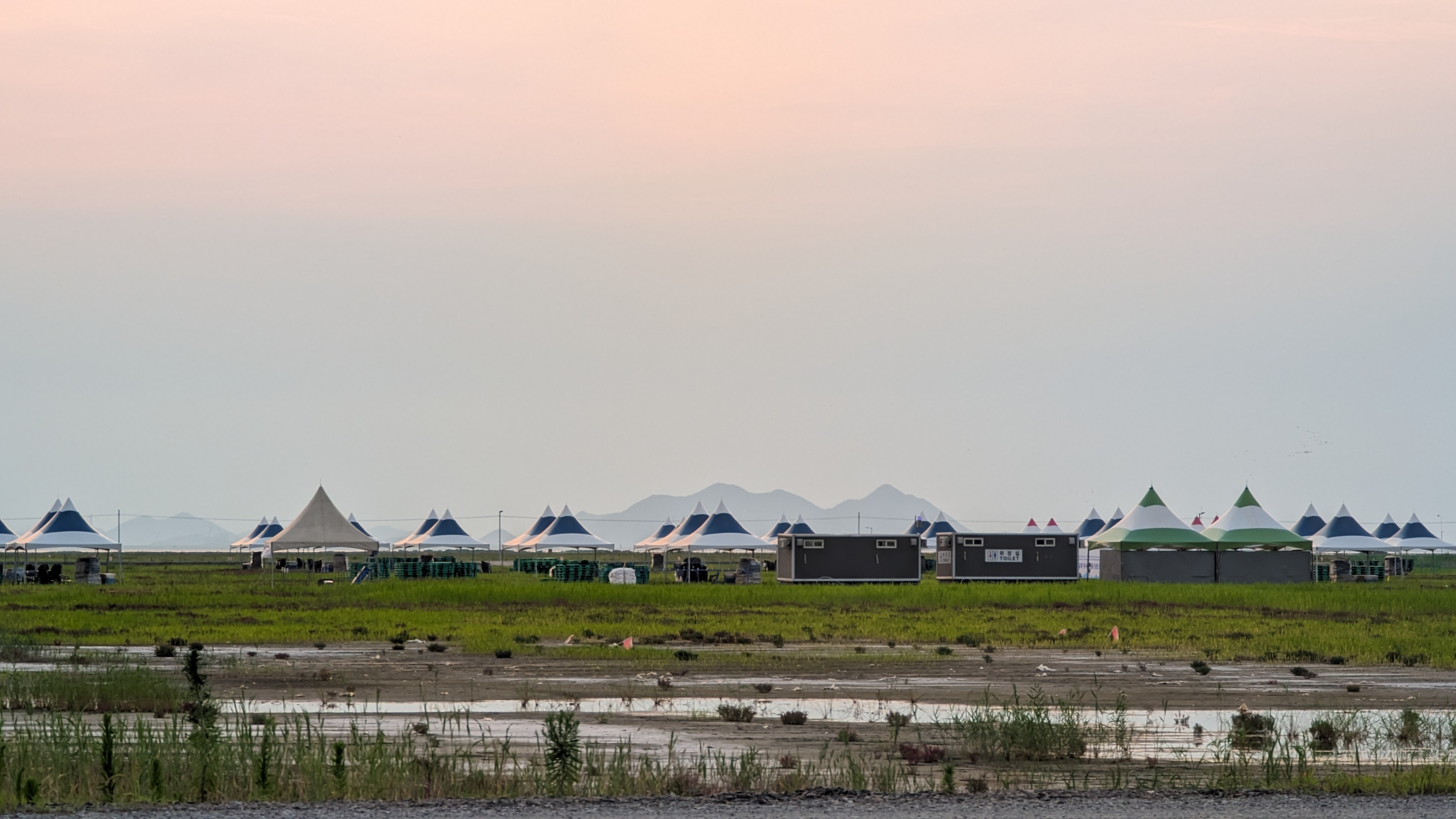
Saturated camping ground at Saemangeum, two days before the arrival of the participants.

Soon after Scouts began arriving it became evident that sanitation, transportation, infrastructure, and other basic needs of the visiting Scouts were not going to be met. Poor planning and execution led to serious issues that were later heightened by the higher than anticipated temperature. The site of the Jamboree was previously tideland and the increased rainfall immediately before the opening ceremony only worsened the issues with the site.

According to SBS News, the Ministry of Gender Equality and Family, which prepared for the festival, received an estimated budget of about ₩200 billion (about US$153 million), constructional costs included. There was no proper drainage facility on the event site, so the site experienced flooding before the opening ceremony. This was seen as more evidence of poor planning of the campsite by the KSA. The start of the Jamboree was delayed when unusually heavy rainfall resulted in flooding of part of the site, causing problems with water and power supplies. Despite organisers digging drainage ditches and deploying water pumps, in some areas tents had to be pitched on pallets because of standing water.

Food shortages and hygiene issues including insufficient food and unmanaged facilities were also raised. Basic infrastructure, such as operational showering facilities, toilets, and trashcans, were not sufficiently provided by the organizers to sufficiently accommodate the 43,000 Scouts. Cases of dermatitis caused by P. fuscipes firebugs were also reported.

=== Heat wave ===
The Jamboree was also significantly affected by a heat wave, with temperatures reaching 35 °C (95 °F). On 4 August, 1,486 people went to the local hospital, which the organizing committee's general secretary, Choi Chang-haeng, attributed to high energy exertion during the opening ceremony's K-pop concert. At the opening ceremony, 88 people required medical attention, and the number of young people affected by the heat rose to over 1,000 the following day, and the organizing committee announced plans to deploy an additional 30 doctors and 60 nurses. Outdoor activities were replaced by cultural programs outside the event area, and authorities provided cooling equipment such as air conditioners.

President Yoon Suk Yeol instructed the government to provide air-conditioned buses and refrigerated trucks to protect participants suffering from the heat wave. Calls for the government's resignation continued in September, with North Jeolla provincial council members calling for the resignation of Minister of Gender Equality and Family Affairs Kim Hyun-sook. The minister was later replaced by Prime Minister Yoon with Kim Haeng.

=== Harassment charge ===
The day after the opening ceremony, a case of a Thai scout leader entering the women's shower area at the camp sparked a wave of criticism. Kim Tae Yeon, leader of the North Jeolla Scout Association, reported that at around 5 a.m., the Thai scout leader followed his female leader into the women's shower area. When caught, he claimed he was there to take a shower. About 100 people witnessed the incident, which was reported to the event organizers. The scout leader received only a warning.

=== Contingent responses ===
On 4 August, UK Scouts (with 4,500 participants) began removing all of their Scouts from the event over the next 2 days to stay in hotels in Seoul instead. Matt Hyde, chief executive of The UK Scout Association, stated that they did this out of concern for four reasons: sanitation issues, especially toilet cleanliness; the lack of food and ability to accommodate dietary restrictions; the heatwave and lack of substantial relief measures; and lack of adequate medical services. He credited the British Embassy in Seoul as their biggest partner in planning new events. The Boy Scouts of America contingent (with 1,100 participants) also decided to withdraw from the jamboree, and had their Scouts evacuated to Camp Humphreys, a US military base, on 6 August.

On 6 August, the Scouts of China, which represents Taiwan (with 1,613 participants), withdrew its contingent from the event citing to the inhospitable environment and safety concerns. The Scout Association of Hong Kong (460 participants), Scouts Aotearoa of New Zealand and the Singapore Scout Association contingents also withdrew on 6 August. On the next day, 7 August, units from the South-East Asian Continent and certain units from the European Continent were offered immediate evacuation.

=== Typhoon Khanun ===
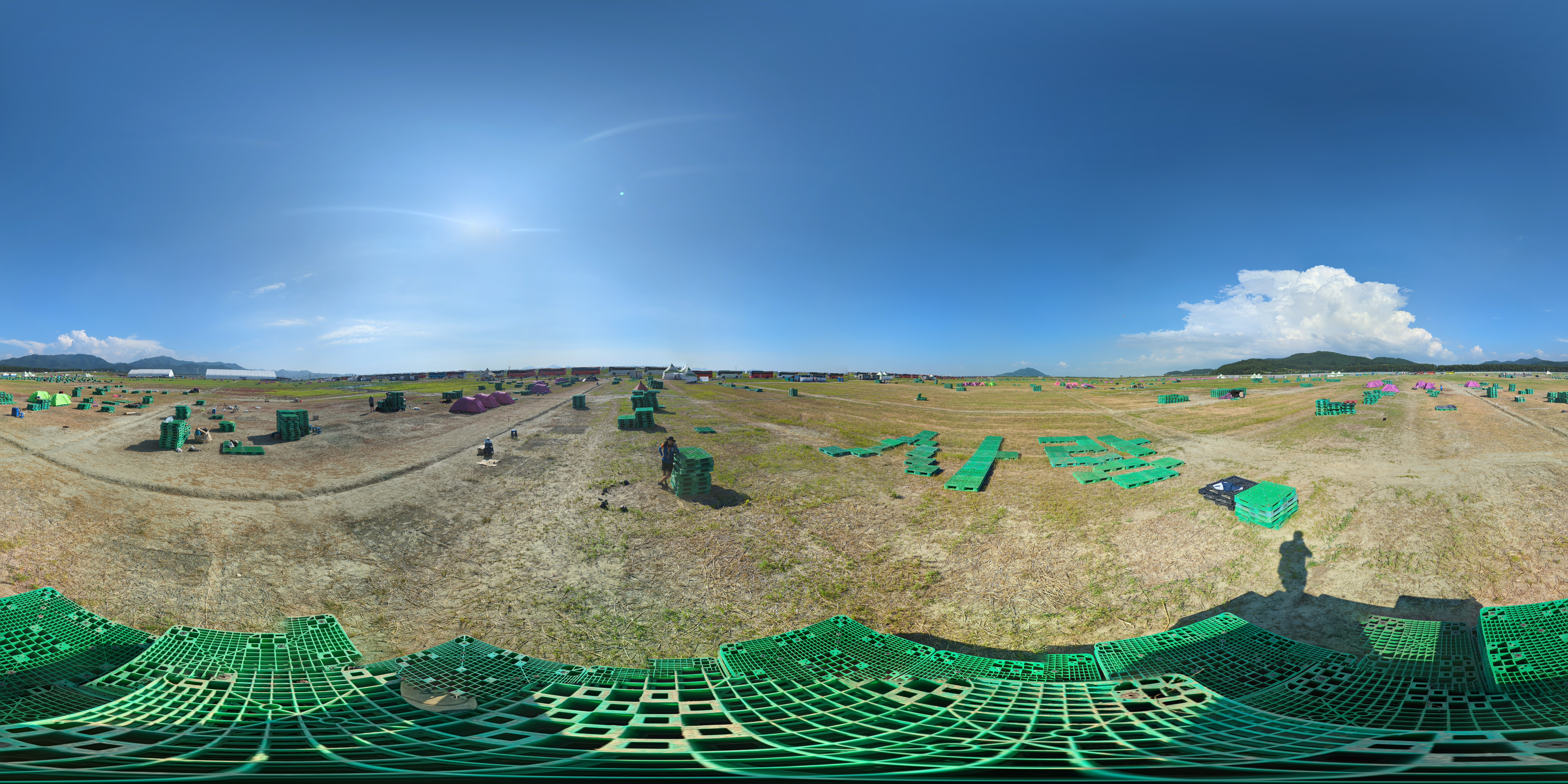
Panorama of the evacuated Jamboree campsite, showing discarded plastic pallets which had been required in inundated areas to pitch tents on.

With Typhoon Khanun being forecast to affect the site, on 7 August the World Organization of the Scout Movement requested that the South Korean government end the Jamboree early and have all participants leave the site. All attendees were relocated to hotels and accommodation in Seoul or whatever the contingent had decided on. However, IST's (International Service Teams) were left to fend for themselves in Saemangeum. There were claims from minor Scout associations of IST's who went missing after Typhoon Khanun hit the campsite. These claims were not confirmed. President Yoon asked local governments across the country to devise tourist programs for the displaced Jamboree participants. The city of Busan found accommodation for 10,000 Scouts and arranged visits to Haeundae Beach and Taejongdae nature park. In North Chungcheong Province, accommodation was found in universities, training centers and hotels. The Jogye Order of Korean Buddhism made facilities available at 170 of their temples. The Ministry of Interior and Safety said it would later settle the local governments' food and accommodations expenditures, which amounted nearly to ₩15 billion (about US$11 million).

=== Review by WOSM ===
In September after the event, the World Organization of the Scout Movement announced to start an independent review of the shortcomings that let to delivery of the event. The panel of reviewers contained members of the Scouts organization as well as external event planners previously involved in high-profile events, like the FIFA World Cup. The report was made public through WOSM's online learning platform in April 2024. In the report, it was claimed that the South Korean government took the leading role of organizing the event, became the "de-facto organizer" while sidelining Korea Scout Association. The report indicated that the government misled the international and national scout organizations over the preparation of the event, and also accused the government of hindering the investigation post-event by not providing information. The government denied the claims, indicating that they were supporting KSA and that no one asked them for information. As of April 2024, this case was still open.

== Closing ceremony ==
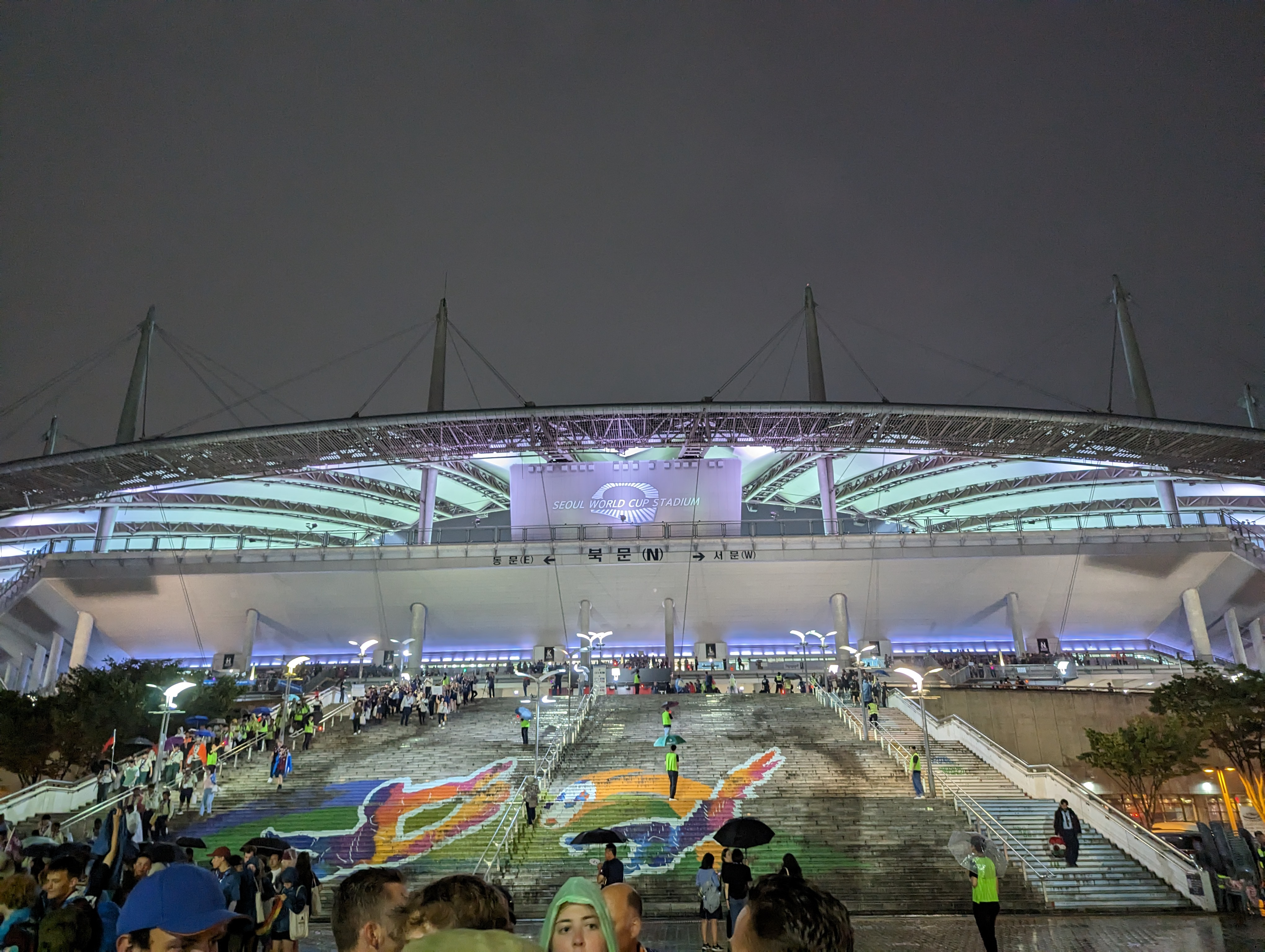
The Seoul World Cup Stadium shortly after K-pop Super Live.

The 2023 Saemangeum World Scout Jamboree K-pop Super Live was a concert that also served as the closing ceremony of the 25th World Scout Jamboree held at the Seoul World Cup Stadium on 11 August 2023. The concert was originally planned to be held on 6 August at an outdoor stadium in Saemangeum, before being rescheduled to 11 August at the Jeonju World Cup Stadium, and then moved to the latter venue. A Korean FA Cup game and an episode of KBS2's Music Bank was cancelled to facilitate the staging of the event.

=== Setlist ===
The presentations were:

- HolyBang – "Venom" and "FTF (Face To Face)"
- The Boyz – "Lip Gloss" and "Thrill Ride"
- The New Six – "Kick It 4 Now"
- ATBO – "Next To Me"
- Xikers – "Do or Die"
- Jo Yu-ri – "Taxi"
- KARD – "Icky"
- P1Harmony – "Jump"
- Libelante – "Musica"
- Zerobaseone – "New Kidz on the Block" and "In Bloom"
- NewJeans – "ETA" and "Hype Boy"
- Kwon Eun-bi – "The Flash"
- Fromis 9 – "#menow"
- Kang Daniel – "SOS"
- Shownu X Hyungwon – "Love Me a Little" and "Wildfire"
- Ive – "I Am" and "Love Dive"
- Itzy – "Cake" and "Wannabe"
- Mamamoo – "Starry Night" and "Hip (Remix ver.)"
- NCT Dream – "Yogurt Shake" and "ISTJ"
- All performers – "Balloons"

== See also ==
- Jamboree on the Internet
- Jamboree on the Air
