= 18th World Scout Jamboree =

1995 event in the Netherlands

- 18th World Scout Jamboree
- Theme: Future is Now
- Location: Dronten
- Country: Netherlands
- Date: 1–11 August 1995
- Attendance: 28,960 Scouts
Previous; 17th World Scout Jamboree	Next; 19th World Scout Jamboree

The 18th World Scout Jamboree (Dutch: 18e Wereldjamboree) was held from 1 to 11 August 1995, and was hosted by the Netherlands on a polder near Biddinghuizen, Dronten community, Flevoland. 28,960 Scouts and staff members from 166 countries and territories participated in the event, the largest representation of countries to date, including 34 countries where Scouting was being born or reborn.

== Opening and royal attendees ==
The event was officially opened by Queen Beatrix of the Netherlands and her husband Prince Claus. The theme was Future is Now and the Jamboree was also visited by Carl XVI Gustaf of Sweden, Princess Basma bint Talal of Jordan and Sadako Ogata, United Nations High Commissioner for Refugees, who inaugurated the second Global Development Village, a major attraction, with Scouts from all over the world sharing experiences and learning more about other ways of life. Various activities and stalls at the Plaza, in the middle of the Jamboree site, provided lighter entertainment.

== Activities ==
Some of the range of activities were the Jamboree Friendship Award, the interreligious ceremony on violence and peace, a Scout Forum and connection via satellite with Boutros Boutros-Ghali, Secretary-General of the United Nations, celebrating the 50th anniversary of the United Nations, with the participation of Scout associations, non-governmental organizations and specialized agencies of the United Nations, in particular UNHCR and the United Nations Children's Fund.

== First steps in forming the Community of Lusophone Scouting ==
The Comunidade do Escutismo Lusófono is based on the Carta do Escutismo Lusófono (Charter of Lusophone Scouting), formulated during the Jamboree on 6 August 1995. The original signatory organizations were the Corpo Nacional de Escutas - Escutismo Católico Português, the União dos Escoteiros do Brasil, the Corpo Nacional de Escutas da Guiné-Bissau and the Associação de Escuteiros de São Tomé e Príncipe.

== Subcamps ==
The 13 subcamps were named after constellations:

- 1 Lyra
- 2 Aries
- 3 Cygnus
- 4 Gemini
- 5 Pegasus
- 7 Leo
- 8 Phoenix
- 9 Aquarius
- 10 Serpens
- 11 Canis Major
- 12 Libra
- 13 Scorpius

The adult-only Hub for IST (International Service Team) members and other adults was:

- 15 Staff: Polaris

== See also ==
- World Scout Jamboree
