= 16th World Scout Jamboree =

- 16th World Scout Jamboree
- Location: Sydney
- Country: Australia
- Date: 1987–1988
- Attendance: 14,434 Scouts
Previous; 15th World Scout Jamboree	Next; 17th World Scout Jamboree

The 16th World Scout Jamboree was held from 30 December 1987 to 7 January 1988, the first World Scout Jamboree held in the Southern Hemisphere, and the first to change the date from the traditional August to January to coincide with summer. The Jamboree was hosted by Australia at Cataract Scout Park a specially constructed Scout tent city situated on a 160-hectare site at Appin, New South Wales, near Sydney, New South Wales. 14,434 Scouts from 84 countries attended the Jamboree, with around 13,000 more in attendance on "Visiting Day". The theme was Bringing the World Together.

The course of New Year's Day passed during the Jamboree, and the opening ceremony of the Jamboree, at midnight on 31 December 1987, was the first official event of Australia's Bicentenary.

Highlights included the Challenge Valley obstacle course, the Bike Bungle, and the Great Aussie Surf Carnival, for which all Scouts were shuttled in over 50 buses to Thirroul Beach.

The United Kingdom contingent included Betty Clay, daughter of the founder of Scouting, and eleven members of the Baden-Powell family, nine of whom were direct descendants of Robert Baden-Powell, 1st Baron Baden-Powell. In addition 18 Ranger Guides attended, the first time members of the Guide Association were allowed to take part in a World Jamboree.

== See also ==
- World Scout Jamboree
