= 26th World Scout Jamboree =

Scout Jamboree

- Official logo for 26th World Scout Jamboree
- Theme: Bravely
- Location: Gdańsk, Pomeranian Voivodeship
- Country: Poland
- Coordinates: 54°20′3.72″N 18°51′35″E
- Date: 30 July to 8 August 2027
- Affiliation: World Organization of the Scout Movement
Previous; 25th World Scout Jamboree	Next; 27th World Scout Jamboree
- Website https://www.jamboree2027.org

The 26th World Scout Jamboree (Polish: XXVI Światowe Jamboree Skautowe) is an upcoming World Scout Jamboree that is scheduled to be held in 2027 in Gdańsk, Sobieszewo Island, Pomeranian Voivodeship, Northern Poland. Participants, also called Youth Participants (YP), will be between the ages of 14 and 17. Individuals who are older than 18 years of age can take part as volunteer International Service Team (IST) members or as volunteer leaders, being directly responsible for 36 Youth Participants with three other Unit Leaders (UL). The event will mark 120 years since the beginning of Scouting worldwide, which will be an important part of the programme.

It was announced that Poland would host the 26th World Scout Jamboree in August 2021 during the 42nd World Scout Conference, held virtually.

The event is scheduled to take place from 30 July to 8 August 2027. On 1 August, a special Friendship Day festivity will take place to mark the 120th anniversary of Scouting. The theme of the jamboree is "Bravely".

== Bid process ==
Both the ZHP (Polish Scouting and Guiding Association) and the Korea Scout Association each launched bids to host the 25th World Scout Jamboree.

The ZHP's proposed theme was "Be the Spark". They received support from the city of Gdańsk to host the jamboree there and the mayor of the city, Paweł Adamowicz, wrote an article for the Huffington Post about why Gdańsk was the ideal host city for the event. The Korea Scout Association was also seeking to host the jamboree to celebrate their centenary, which was in 2022. Their proposed location for the jamboree was Saemangeum. Their theme was "Draw Your Dream". The Korea Scout organisation ultimately won the bid, becoming the host city of the upcoming 25th World Scout Jamboree.

Following this unsuccessful bid to host the 25th World Scout Jamboree, Poland bid to host the Jamboree in 2027. In August 2022, it was announced that Poland would host the 26th World Scout Jamboree.

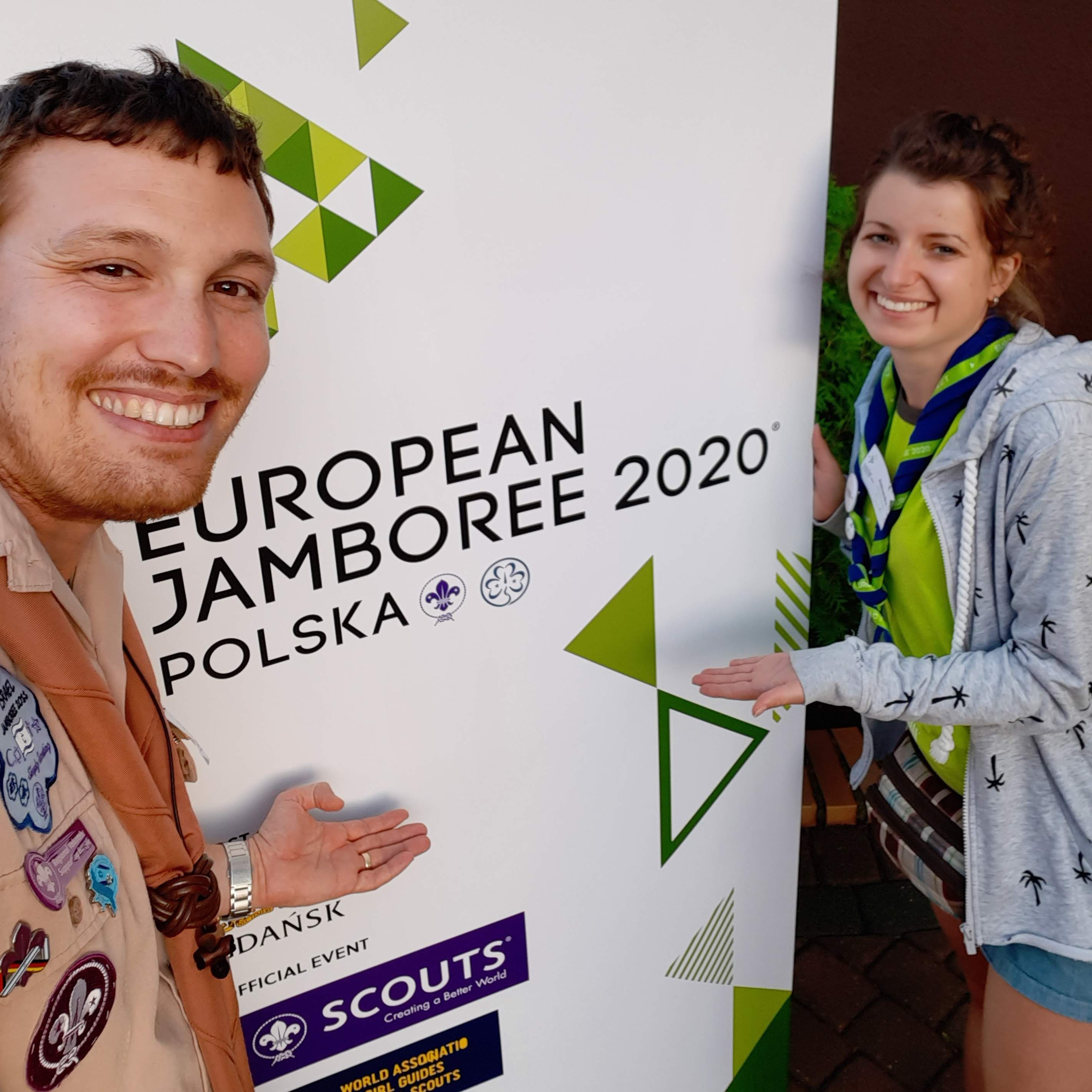
Advertisement for the European Scout Jamboree in Gdansk

=== European Scout Jamboree 2020 ===
In response to the initial failed bid for the hosting of the 25th World Scout Jamboree, Scouts from almost 30 European countries requested the Polish Scouting Association to consider organizing the European Scout Jamboree, which would have taken place in Gdańsk, Poland, in 2020. In April 2020, the Jamboree was postponed, and rescheduled to take place instead in August 2021 due to the ongoing COVID-19 pandemic. In November 2020, the Jamboree Executive Team and Jamboree Planning Team made the decision to cancel the Jamboree in 2021. The decision came after registered participant numbers dropped below the minimum needed of 10,000 as well as more COVID-19 related risks emerged. The result of this meant it was not financially viable for the Jamboree to go ahead and ultimately led to the full cancellation.
