= Typhoon Khanun (2023) =

Pacific typhoon in 2023

Typhoon Khanun (Falcon)
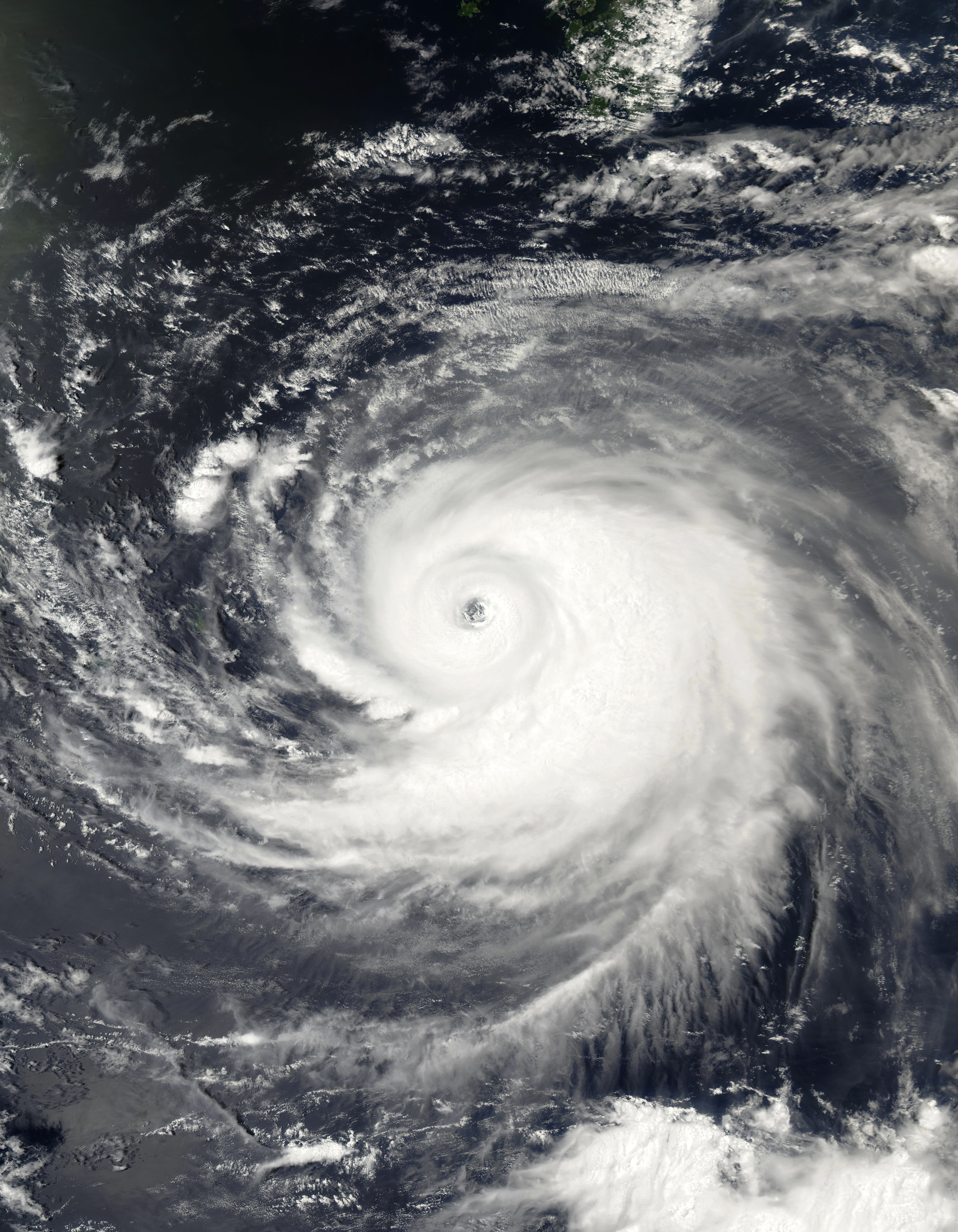
- Khanun at peak intensity while approaching the Okinawa Islands on August 1

Meteorological history
- Formed: July 26, 2023
- Extratropical: August 10, 2023
- Dissipated: August 12, 2023

Very strong typhoon
- 10-minute sustained (JMA)
- Highest winds: 175 km/h (110 mph)
- Lowest pressure: 930 hPa (mbar); 27.46 inHg

Category 4-equivalent typhoon
- 1-minute sustained (SSHWS/JTWC)
- Highest winds: 230 km/h (145 mph)
- Lowest pressure: 924 hPa (mbar); 27.29 inHg

Overall effects
- Fatalities: 13
- Injuries: 115
- Missing: 16
- Damage: $268 million (2023 USD)
- Areas affected: Philippines, Taiwan, Japan, Korean Peninsula, China, Russian Far East
- IBTrACS
- Part of the 2023 Pacific typhoon season

Typhoon Khanun, (Note: The name Khanun (Thai: ขนุน, [kʰa˨˩ nun˩˩˦]) was contributed by Thailand and means jackfruit (Artocarpus heterophyllus) in Thai.) known in the Philippines as Typhoon Falcon, was a powerful, erratic and long-lived tropical cyclone that moved along Okinawa, Japan and the west coast of the Korean Peninsula in early August 2023. It was the sixth named storm and fourth typhoon of the 2023 Pacific typhoon season. Khanun started as a low-pressure area, where it then rapidly intensified into a Category 4-equivalent typhoon on the Saffir–Simpson scale over the Philippine Sea on August 1, before undergoing an eyewall replacement cycle.

Khanun weakened slightly as it moved closer to the Ryukyu Islands, battering them with heavy rain and strong winds. Khanun began to degrade its eye on satellite imagery due to quasi-stationary and warming cloud tops. Steady weakening continued as Khanun approached the Korean Peninsula and it eventually made landfall on Geojedo in South Korea. The storm dissipated shortly thereafter.

Khanun became the first to pass through the Korean Peninsula from south to north since recordkeeping began in 1951. In South Korea, approximately 40,350 people lost power. At least 159 different facilities were reportedly damaged. More than 1.019 ha (2.52 acres) of farmland in South Gyeongsang Province suffered damage. State media in North Korea reported that Khanun also caused minor damage. In Russia, Khanun brought heavy rains to parts of the Primorsky Krai in the Russian Far East, Russia dispatched a task team to observe the cleanup of areas of the country. A state of emergency was declared in 21 municipalities.13 people have been reported dead and 16 have been reported to have gone missing following the typhoon, another 115 remain injured, and damage totaled at US$268 million.

== Meteorological history ==
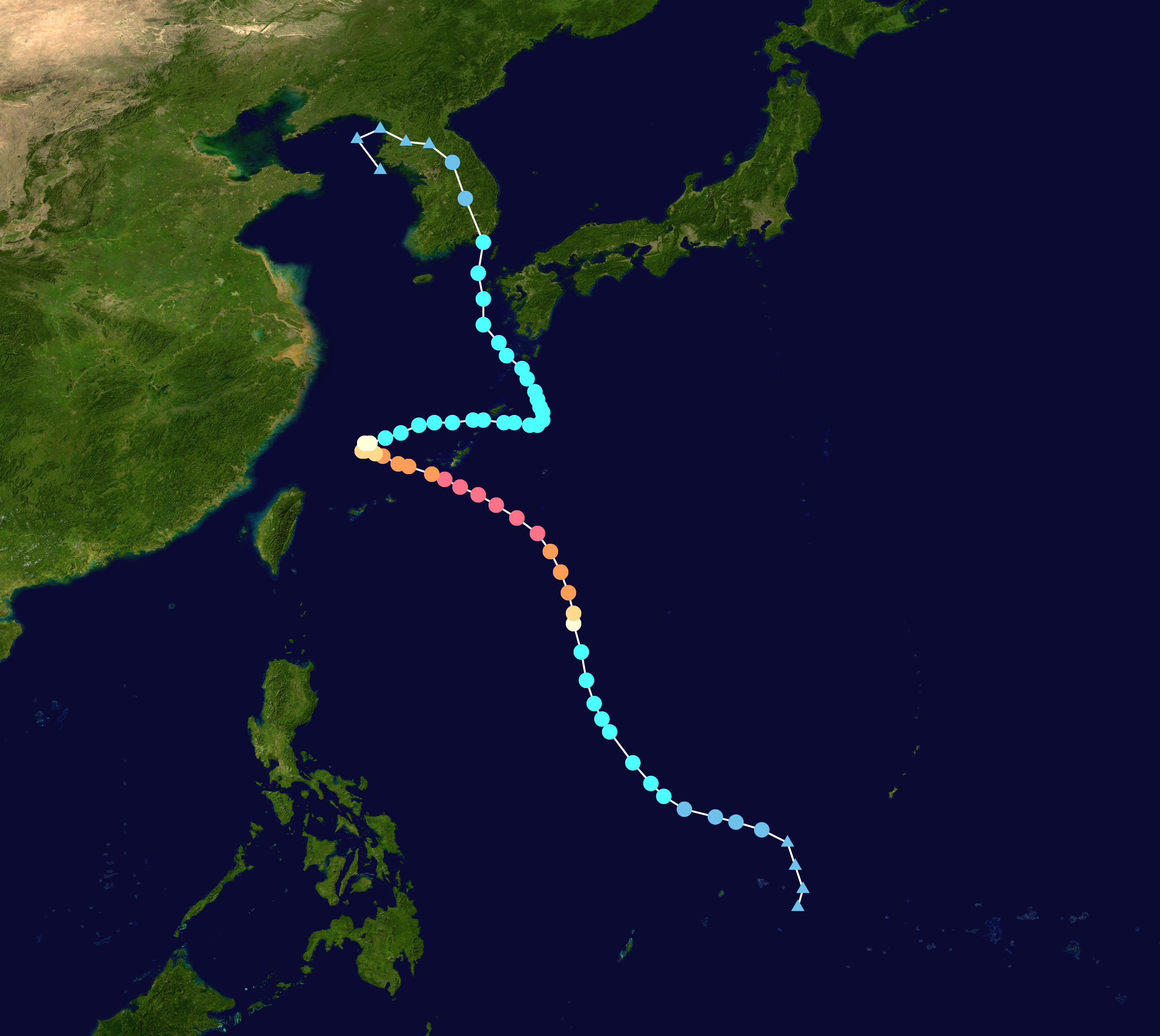
Map plotting the storm's track and intensity, according to the Saffir–Simpson scale Map key Saffir–Simpson scale Tropical depression (≤38 mph, ≤62 km/h) Tropical storm (39–73 mph, 63–118 km/h) Category 1 (74–95 mph, 119–153 km/h) Category 2 (96–110 mph, 154–177 km/h) Category 3 (111–129 mph, 178–208 km/h) Category 4 (130–156 mph, 209–251 km/h) Category 5 (≥157 mph, ≥252 km/h) Unknown Storm type Tropical cyclone Subtropical cyclone Extratropical cyclone, remnant low, tropical disturbance, or monsoon depression

After Typhoon Doksuri devastated several countries, the Japan Meteorological Agency (JMA) announced the formation of a low-pressure area in the Pacific Ocean. The JMA started warning the system, declaring it a tropical depression. Analysis from the JMA indicated that the system was in a favorable environment for development, with warm sea surface temperatures and low vertical wind shear. The Joint Typhoon Warning Center (JTWC) issued a Tropical Cyclone Formation Alert for an area of convection, east of Yap.

By 09:00 UTC on July 27, the agency subsequently initiated advisories on the system and classified it as 06W. Satellite imagery found that its low-level circulation center had become defined, however, the convective structure continued to remain disorganized, the JMA and the JTWC upgraded the system to a tropical storm, with the JMA assigning the name Khanun for the system. Khanun consolidating LLCC with formative convective banding and deep convection over the eastern semicircle.

Khanun entered the Philippine Area of Responsibility around 03:00 UTC (11:00 PHT) on July 29, and was named Falcon by the Philippine Atmospheric, Geophysical, and Astronomical Services Administration (PAGASA). Tracking northward due to a nearby mid-level subtropical high-pressure area, Khanun intensified into a severe tropical storm. A central dense overcast (CDO) and a ragged eye developed, indicating that Khanun intensified into a typhoon. Over 24 hours, its maximum sustained wind speeds grew by 130 km/h (80 mph) and eventually reached a peak of 220 km/h (140 mph), equivalent to Category 4 status on the Saffir–Simpson scale. The JMA simultaneously assessed Khanun to have winds of 175 km/h (110 mph), and a minimum pressure of 930 hPa (27.46 inHg). Khanun left the Philippine Area of Responsibility at around 03:00 PHT (19:00 UTC) on August 1. Khanun weakened slightly as it moved move closer to the Ryukyu Islands, battering them with heavy rain and strong winds.

Khanun weakened further due to an ongoing eyewall replacement cycle, allowing its eye to grow massively, but degrading its overall structure. The inner eye began to encounter colder ocean temperatures on infrared satellite imagery, surrounded by a symmetric ring of cold. Despite the cycle on August 3, Khanun had moved over cooler sea surface temperatures, and hence continued its weakening trend. Khanun's eye had degraded on satellite imagery due to quasi-stationary and the warming cloud tops. However, as Khanun tracked poleward, the storm turned towards the northwest as it rounded the southern edge of the subtropical high. Following structural weakening, the JMA and JTWC downgraded Khanun to a severe tropical storm, with estimated winds of 95 km/h (60 mph). The storm began to look strong on satellite images with deep banding features over the quadrants. After passing north of Tokunoshima, the storm accelerated to the southeast. The center of the storm becoming exposed and deep convective banding wrapping into a broad circulation. Satellite imagery showed a consolidating LLCC with formative convective banding and deep convection over the northern semicircle, the storm passed southwestern island of Kyushu. Around 00:00 UTC on August 10, Khanun made landfall on Geojedo Islands in South Korea with winds of 85 km/h (50 mph). Rapidly moving towards the northwest, the storm low-level circulation center was obscured by a lingering deep convection. The JMA continued to monitor Khanun as a tropical cyclone until early on August 11.

== Preparations, impact, and aftermath ==
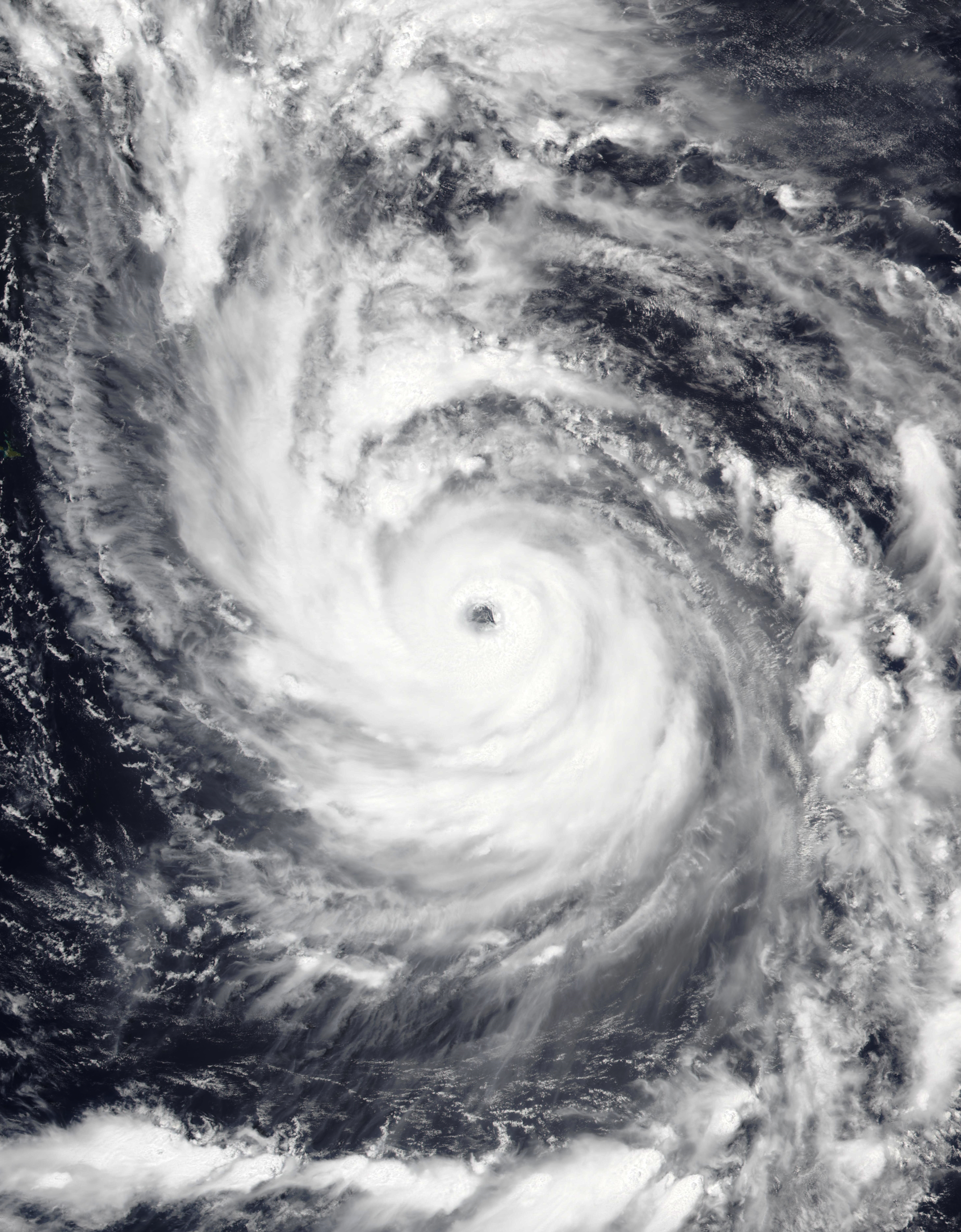
Typhoon Khanun intensifying rapidly and developing an eye feature off the Philippines Sea on July 31.

=== Japan ===
Residents within the Okinawa and Amami regions in Japan's southwest were advised to prepare for a typhoon. The JMA predicted up to 100 mm (3.9 in) of rain in Okinawa over the next 24 hours, and up to 150 mm (5.9 in) in Amami. Thunderstorms with up to 400 mm (16 in) of rain were anticipated to hit the regions of Kyushu and neighboring Shikoku. Nagasaki moved a commemoration of the 78th anniversary of the atomic bombings of Hiroshima and Nagasaki from a park to an inside convention center. As of August 7, at least 115 people have been injured and two deaths were reported in Okinawa. In the village of Ōgimi, a 90-year-old-man was found underneath a collapsed garage and was later pronounced dead. In Uruma, an 89-year-old-woman suffered burns all over her body after a concrete house burned down caused by a candle that was used during a blackout. The woman later died at a local hospital. The only road leading to the small village of Kitauehara collapsed, leaving residents stranded. According to the Okinawa Electric Power Company, the typhoon knocked off power to approximately 220,000 residences or around 30% of Okinawans.

At least 7,000 houses are without electricity on Amami, an island northeast of the Okinawan islands. Off the coast of Ishigaki Island, the cargo ship Xin Hai Zhou 2 (which had run aground in January) broke in half amid rough seas produced by the typhoon. Damage across Okinawa exceeded ¥2.05 billion (US$14.3 million). On 6 August, the city of Naha began distributing 1,170 L (310 US gal) of water to apartment complexes and farms suffering from prolonged water and power shortages. On mainland Japan, poor weather forced the cancellation of 25 San'yō Shinkansen services between Hiroshima and Kokura stations on August 9 and 10, affecting 5,200 passengers. Local train services in Yamaguchi Prefecture were similarly suspended.

=== Korean Peninsula ===
Satellite loop of Tropical Storm Khanun a few hours before landfall in South Korea on August 10.

Typhoon Khanun became the first to pass through the Korean Peninsula from south to north since recordkeeping began in 1951. Khanun impacted Geojedo in South Korea, a small island located off the southeastern coast of the nation. A man drowned in flooding in Daegu. while another man in a wheelchair who was reported missing was found dead in a reservoir. More than 15,862 people were evacuated. Across the country, approximately 40,350 people lost power. Although electrical power was restored or around 94% Accumulated rainfall totaled 382.5 mm (15.06 in) in Yangsan, 322.4 mm (12.69 in) in Gangneung, 315.7 mm (12.43 in) in Sokcho, 302 mm (11.9 in) in Chilgok, and 296 mm (11.7 in) in Gimcheon. At least 159 different facilities were reportedly damaged. Due to flooding and landslides, some 680 roads were closed, primarily in the southeast. In total, 34 schools suffered minor damage. At least 1.019 ha (2.52 acres) of farmland in South Gyeongsang Province suffered damage. South Korean President Yoon Suk Yeol ordered the government to provide immediate and sufficient support to those affected by Typhoon Khanun. Total damage was calculated at ₩55.8 billion (US$42.4 million). Due to the changed path and expected impact of the typhoon, the Korean government in cooperation with the World Organization of the Scout Movement relocated the 43,000 international attendees camping at the 25th World Scout Jamboree to hotel or other accommodation. Gangwon Province was anticipated to receive up to 600 mm (24 in) of precipitation, while the Seoul was expected to receive up to 200 mm (7.9 in). As Khanun approached, at least 144 flights within and outside of Jeju Island were canceled, according to the Korea Airport Corporation.

In North Korea, the government also stated that if the country did not prepare for disaster prevention before the storm, the country's economy would suffer severely. North Korea warned its citizens to prepare for the typhoon, declaring that all governing party organizations "should wage a dynamic struggle to minimize the damage." Heavy rains from the storm triggered significant flooding in Wonsan. The Workers' Party of Korea's official newspaper, the Rodong Sinmun reported that officials were ordered to implement a disaster emergency response and devise evacuation plans. The Korean Central News Agency (KCNA) reported that Khanun also caused minor damage, which resulted in broken tree branches. The KCNA also reported that South Hwanghae Province had directed efforts toward protecting crops from the storm. North Koreans were instructed to take all necessary precautions to protect the images of the Kim dynasty. Additionally, the state-run North Korean newspaper, requested North Koreans to preserve statues, mosaics, paintings, and other Kim dynasty monuments. The Korean Central Television reported wind speeds of more than 18 km/h (11 mph) with averaging 181 mm (7.1 in) in Kangwon Province. North Korean leader Kim Jong Un reportedly visited the typhoon-affected districts in Ogye-ri, Anbyon County in Kangwon Province, oversaw the recovery efforts. The North Korean leader slammed "irresponsible" officials for failing to take preventive measures.

=== Elsewhere ===
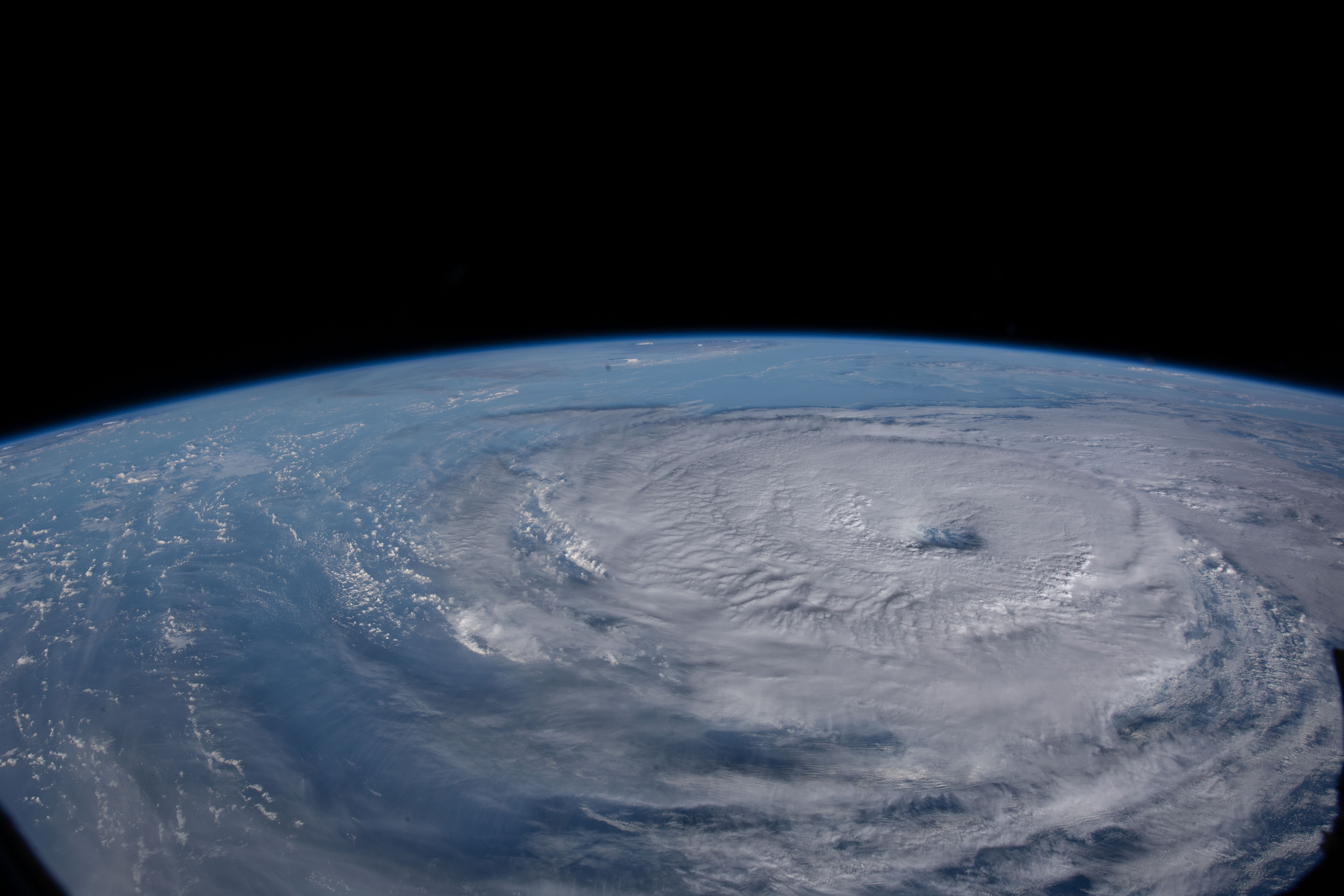
Typhoon Khanun from the International Space Station as it orbited 259 miles above the Pacific Ocean.

As Khanun (known locally as Typhoon Falcon) entered the PAR, the PAGASA issued their subsequent bulletins, Although Khanun did not directly affect the Philippines, both Khanun and Typhoon Doksuri enhanced the monsoon for several days, which caused severe flooding throughout the country. Local governments across Luzon also suspended classes in public schools and work in government offices. Khanun exited the PAR, with the PAGASA issuing their final advisory on the system. After days of rain triggered by the southwest monsoon, some communities in Bulacan remained inundated. At least 2,462,730 individuals (670,792 families) and 1,042 barangays across Luzon and Visayas were reported by the DSWD to be affected by the southwest monsoon rains. As rains continued throughout the day, the Angat Dam reached its spilling level of 195.88 cubic metres (6,917 cu ft). Khanun is posing a threat to Taiwan, and President Tsai Ing-wen urged the public to avoid outdoor activities including hiking, fishing, and other coastal pursuits. Transportation was disrupted with several domestic flights cancelled.

As a precautionary measure, 900 people in the districts of Kaohsiung have been evacuated. Power outages were reported in 1,300 households. A car accident in Taoyuan's Fusing District resulted in four fatalities and two injuries. Approximately 500 people were stranded on the mountainous villages across central and southern Taiwan due to the rainfall caused by Khanun. Khanun caused a total of NT$238 million (US$7.5 million) in agricultural losses. In China, more than 1,200 people in Heilongjiang Province were evacuated. The Heilongjiang Province issued a two red alerts for rainstorms while Hegang, Jiamusi, Shuangyashan, Jixi and Mudanjiang is anticipated to receive 40 mm (1.6 in) to 80 mm (3.1 in) of precipitation. Local government reported that Shangzhi would cease classes, work, production, operations, and business activities. Khanun's heavy rains caused widespread flash floods and mudslides, killing at least two people and 16 were missing. The torrential rain caused damage to roads, bridges, and power supply, along with disrupting at least 20 passenger train services. Damage in Northeast China reached CN¥920 million (US$127 million).

Khanun brought heavy rains to parts of the Primorsky Krai in the Russian Far East, resulting in flooding. After the storm passed, Russia dispatched a task team to observe the cleanup of areas of the country. A state of emergency were declared in 21 municipalities in Russia. State media reported 4,368 flooded homes, along with 5,654 adjacent sites and 7 apartment structures. More than 2,000 people from the flooded areas, evacuated from Typhoon Khanun. Three were reports casualties in Russia. At least 4,368 residential buildings, 5,654 household and 43 roads were submerged. Total damage of the region were about ₽7.7 billion (US$77 million).

== See also ==
- Weather of 2023
- Tropical cyclones in 2023

Other significant typhoons that affected the Korean Peninsula:

- Typhoon Sarah (1959) – an intense typhoon which also affected the Ryukyu Islands and South Korea, and is considered the second most powerful typhoon to strike the latter.
- Typhoon Prapiroon (2000) – another system that took a similar path, becoming one of South Korea's costliest typhoons ever.
- Typhoon Saomai (2000) – a long-tracked and intense tropical cyclone that brought heavy rainfall and flooding in Japan and the Korean Peninsula in September 2000, compounding the effects of Prapiroon.
- Typhoon Rusa (2002) – the most powerful typhoon to strike South Korea since Sarah in 1959.
- Typhoon Ewiniar (2006) – a powerful typhoon which had a similar track.
- Typhoon Kompasu (2010) – the first significant system to directly strike the Seoul Metropolitan Area since Prapiroon in 2000
- Tropical Storm Khanun (2012) – a deadly tropical storm with the same name and affected the same area in 2012.
- Typhoon Bolaven (2012) – the most powerful storm to strike the Korean Peninsula in nearly a decade.
- Typhoon Soulik (2018) – an unusually large typhoon which became the deadliest typhoon to strike the Korean Peninsula since 2012's Khanun.
- Typhoon Hinnamnor (2022) – a powerful typhoon that also stalled before making tracking north and hit the peninsula a year prior.
