= 20th World Scout Jamboree =

2002–2003 Scout jamboree in Thailand

Coordinates: 12°36′40″N 100°56′26″E

- Theme: Share our World, Share our Cultures
- Location: Sattahip
- Country: Thailand
- Date: 28 December 2002 – 8 January 2003
- Attendance: 30,000 Scouts (est.)
Previous; 19th World Scout Jamboree	Next; 21st World Scout Jamboree

The 20th World Scout Jamboree took place in the naval base in Sattahip, Thailand between 28 December 2002 and 8 January 2003 - the 62nd anniversary of the death of Lord Baden-Powell, the founder of the Scout Movement. It was the second World Jamboree to be held in Southeast Asia after the Philippines hosted the event in 1959.

The Jamboree provided an opportunity for 30,000 Scouts from all over the world to spend 12 days camping together and attend activities designed for them in self-development and social responsibility, within the framework of the educational Scout method. The Jamboree fostered the progress and unity of World Scout Movement and strongly linked it to Asian culture, both in terms of activities, mainly Thai dancing, and method.

The theme of the 20th World Scout Jamboree was Share our World, Share our Cultures.

As with previous Jamborees, the standard troop size was 36 youths plus 4 adult leaders.

The camp was held in Sattahip, Chonburi Province, about 180 km (110 mi) southeast of Bangkok. The camp site was located on a beach on the Gulf of Thailand, covering 1,200 ha (3,000 acres) and consisting of flat plains, foothills, and a white sandy beach.

The daily newspaper SawasdeeJam (Sawasdee + Jamboree), was produced for the camp.

The emblem shows a typical Thai roof. The A-shaped gables in the roof represent Thailand's development of traditions and cultures and the sharing of these traditions from generation to generation.

At the Closing Ceremony, a recorded message from The Hon. Betty Clay (née Baden-Powell), then 85, the younger daughter of the Founder, was broadcast.

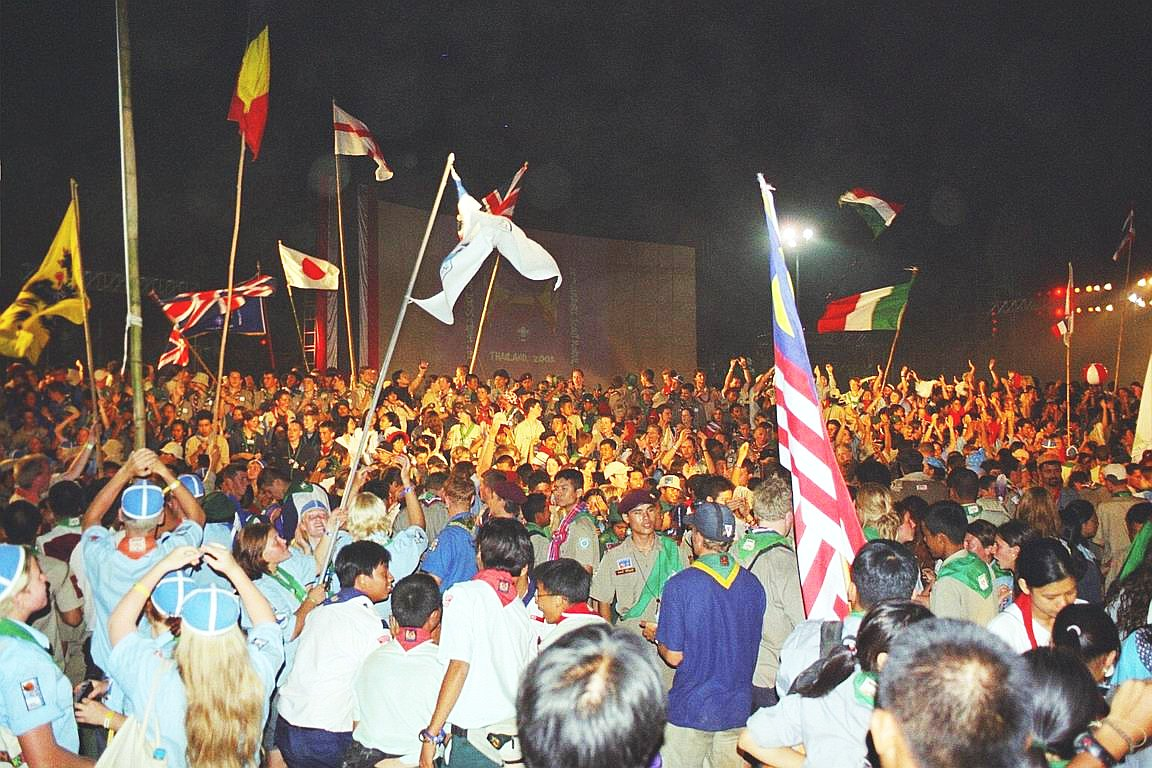
Scouts at the closing ceremony.
