= 17th World Scout Jamboree =

Scouting event in South Korea

- Location: Seoraksan National Park
- Country: South Korea
- Date: 1991
- Attendance: 18,000 Scouts
Previous; 16th World Scout Jamboree	Next; 18th World Scout Jamboree

The 17th World Scout Jamboree was held from August 8 to 16, 1991, and was hosted by South Korea at Seoraksan National Park, 200 km from the border with North Korea, and another 200 km from Seoul.

Many Lands, One World was the theme, which brought together approximately 20,000 Scouts from 135 countries and territories, and in particular, Eastern European nations, as all the formerly communist states of Central and Eastern Europe and the Soviet Union were developing Scouting in the months preceding the dissolution of the Soviet Union. Scouts from Czechoslovakia and Hungary participated as members of the World Scout Movement for the first time since 1947. Bulgaria, Belarus, Estonia, Latvia, Lithuania, Poland, Romania, Russia, Ukraine and Yugoslavia each fielded contingents.

The Jamboree started with bad weather, with rain and flooding providing major problems. The opening and closing ceremonies were designed to rival those of the 1988 Summer Olympics. The Jamboree sported the first Global Development Village program and was visited by Korean president Roh Tae-woo, Carl XVI Gustaf of Sweden and Prince Moulay Rachid of Morocco.

A newspaper "SorakDaily" was produced for attendees.

The British contingent transported a replica Brownsea Island Scout camp to re-enact Robert Baden-Powell, 1st Baron Baden-Powell's 1907 experiment in Scouting. It became the most photographed and filmed event at the Jamboree.

Scouts also experienced home hospitality in South Korea and Japan.

== See also ==
- 25th World Scout Jamboree, held in Korea in 2023
