= Picarquín, Chile =

Coordinates: 33°57′35″S 70°37′41″W

Picarquín, Chile was the site of the 19th World Scout Jamboree, held in December 1998 and January 1999, which brought together 31,000 Scouts and Guides from all over the world. It is located in the commune of Mostazal, in the northern portion of the Libertador General Bernardo O'Higgins Region. Since December 2011 Picarquín is the site where Mystery Land Chile takes place.
