= 19th World Scout Jamboree =

- Location: Picarquín
- Country: Chile
- Date: 27 December 1998 to 6 January 1999
- Attendance: 30,519 Scouts (est)
Previous; 18th World Scout Jamboree	Next; 20th World Scout Jamboree

The 19th World Jamboree (Spanish: 19º Jamboree Scout Mundial) in Chile, the first ever in South America, took place at a 7,400-acre (30 km^{2}) site (Hacienda Picarquín) in the foothills of the Andes, some 38 miles (61 km) south of the capital city of Santiago. For 11 days, from 27 December 1998 to 6 January 1999, approximately 30,519 Scouts and leaders from nearly every Scout association in the world assembled for this 4-yearly event.

The Jamboree started with a drought, prompting water to be diverted from the City of Rancagua, with sailing activities proving difficult owing to the lack of proper water bodies on Picarquín. The Jamboree sported the third Global Development Village program and was opened by Chilean president Eduardo Frei Ruiz-Tagle.

A daily newspaper, el Talí, was produced for the camp.

== Theme ==
The jamboree theme was "Building Peace Together". The program included full days of patrol activities. These included:

- The Global Development Village, with exhibits and workshops devoted to science and technology, cultural and artistic expression, environmental issues, and intercultural peace and understanding.
- A tournament trail of physical challenges and typical games from all across the Americas.
- A day of community service in nearby villages.
- An overnight hike through the site's 5,700 acres (23 km^{2}) of rugged and desert-like countryside.
- Day visits to area farms, fruit-packing factories, and mining works — ending with a country barbecue and folklore activity in Rancagua, the region's capital city.
