= Kirarahama (Yamaguchi) =

Beach in Yamaguchi, Japan

Coordinates: 34.008087°N 131.372635°E

Location of Kirarahama in Yamaguchi Bay

Kirarahama (きらら浜) or Kirara Beach is a recreational beach located on the Seto Inland Sea in Ajisu, Yamaguchi City, Yamaguchi Prefecture, Japan. The name Kirara (雲母, "mica") or "isinglass," is similar to the Japanese sound effect "kirakira" used for something glittery. Kirara Beach glitters in the sunlight, fitting the appearance of mica.It is a manmade beach that has a few restaurants and a glass-making factory.

Kirara Beach and Yamaguchi Bay are resting places for migratory birds heading to Southeast Asia from Siberia and Kamchatka, as well as those from Mongolia and China heading for Shikoku and Kyūshū. Millions of wild birds visit Kirara Beach every year. The climate is mild, the waters are clear, the air is clean, and the beach is abundant in greenery. There is a natural park on the site, where wildlife living on Kirara Beach is preserved.

Kirara Beach was the site of the 23rd World Scout Jamboree, in 2015.
