= 23rd World Scout Jamboree =

Scouting event

- Theme: 和 Wa: A Spirit of Unity
- Age range: 14-18 participants, 18+ Unit Leaders/ISTs
- Headquarters: 1-34-3 Hongo, Bunkyo-ku, Tokyo 〒113-0033
- Location: Kirarahama, Yamaguchi
- Country: Japan
- Coordinates: 34°01′N 131°23′E
- Date: 28 July to 8 August 2015
- Attendance: 33,628 participants
- Camp Chief: Takayasu Okushima
- Affiliation: Scout Association of Japan, World Organization of the Scout Movement
Previous; 22nd World Scout Jamboree	Next; 24th World Scout Jamboree
- Website www.23wsj.jp

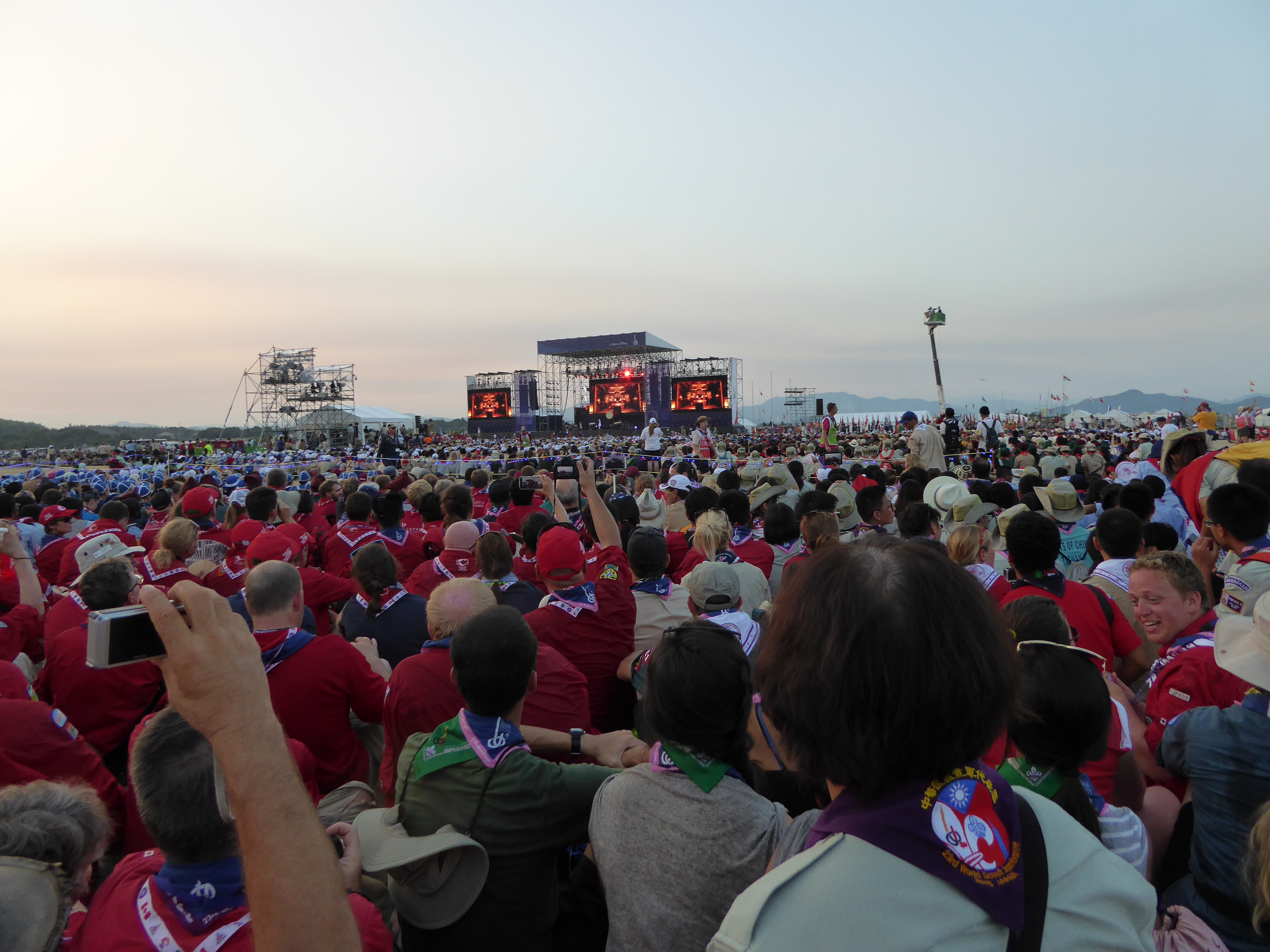

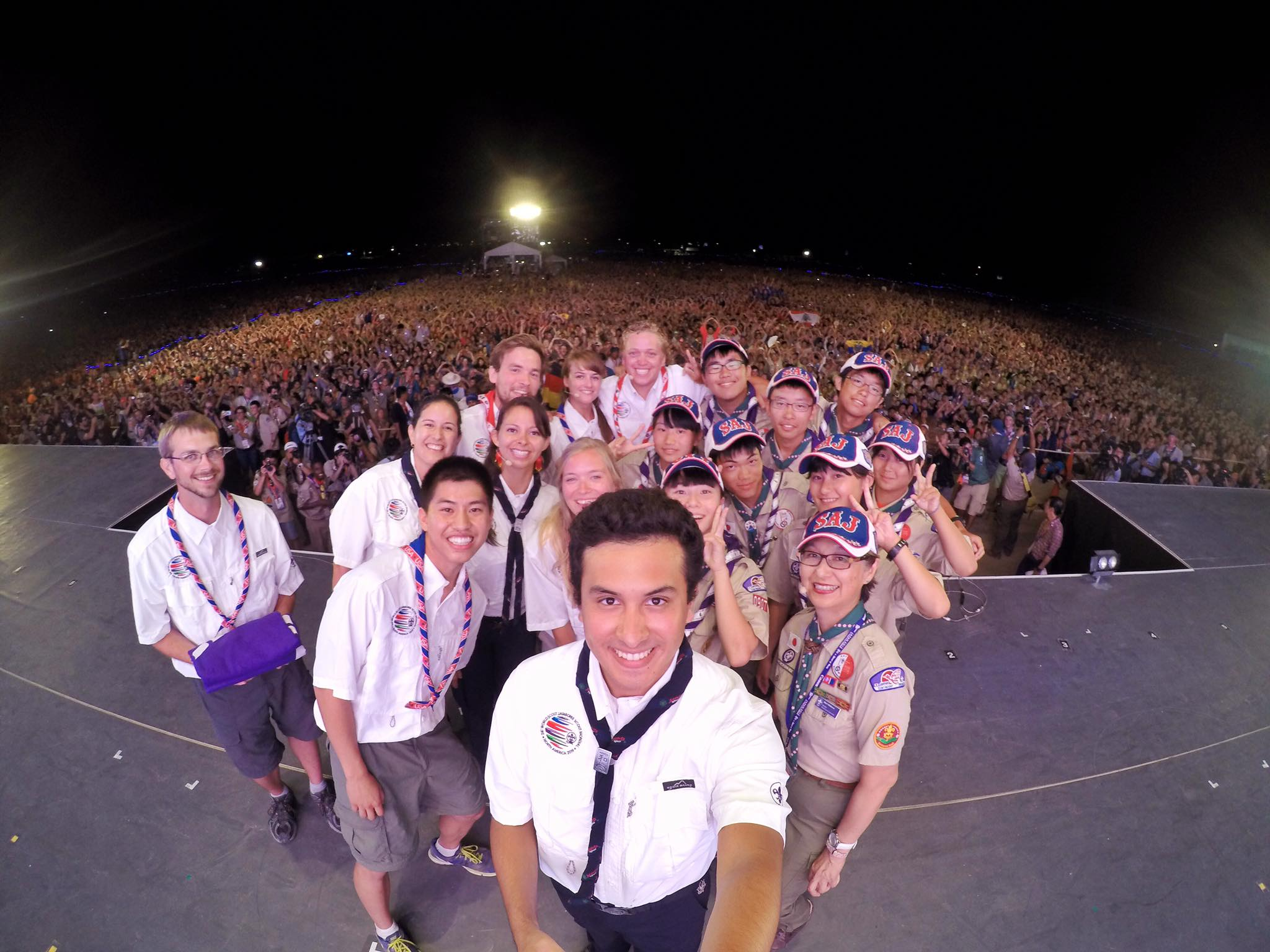

The 23rd World Scout Jamboree (Japanese: 第23回世界スカウトジャンボリー, Hepburn: dai-nijūsan-kai sekai sukauto jamborii) took place in Kirarahama, Yamaguchi in western Japan from 28 July to 8 August 2015. The event was attended by 33,628 Scouts and leaders (including 7,979 International Service Team (IST) members who served as volunteer staff). The theme was 和 Wa: A Spirit of Unity. The kanji 和, meaning harmony, unity or togetherness, was part of the theme. Wa is also an early name for Japan.

== Site ==
The Jamboree site is a flat land with an area of 2.8 km north to south by 1 km east to west. There is a natural park on the site, where wildlife living on Kirarahama is preserved. Millions of wild birds visit Kirarahama every year. In addition, the site is equipped with water supply and sewage systems, as well as a sports dome and a swimming pool that were used for programs. Especially for the 23rd WSJ, two supermarkets, a hospital and an arena were temporarily erected. Access to the site is easy by airplanes and Shinkansen bullet trains.

The site is located 30 minutes from Shin-Yamaguchi Station on the JR Shinkansen line, which is capable of carrying a large number of passengers. Four international airports serve within a 2-hour radius of the site, out of which Fukuoka International Airport and Kansai International Airport are located west and east of the site.

Several inspections have been carried out on the Jamboree site by the Japanese government and other foreign governments and organizations. The site is approximately 1200 km away from Fukushima, the area affected by the Fukushima Daiichi nuclear disaster, so the inspections have concluded that the country is safe for hosting the Jamboree. Members from the World Organization of the Scout Movement also concluded that the site location is safe.

== Operation Kirara ==
At each World Scout Jamboree, a solidarity project is undertaken to support the attendance of Scouts from around the world who might not be able to attend the Jamboree for financial reasons. This Jamborees project was called Operation Kirara. Operation Kirara was the largest solidarity operation ever undertaken for any World Scout Jamboree. Support was provided to enable 480 Scouts from 90 countries to attend the Jamboree. Scouts were supported from every Scout region of World Scouting. The financial support covered the cost of transportation, visas, camp equipment as well as the cost of the Scouts stay before and after the Jamboree. Special support was given from the Japanese government and the Scout Association of Japan who helped make the project possible.

Theme of the 23rd World Scout Jamboree

== Ceremonies ==
The opening ceremony was held in the evening of 29 July 2015, and was broadcast live online at www.scout.org. It included a flag ceremony of all attending contingents, a speech from the governor of Yamaguchi Prefecture, Tsugumasa Muraoka and a speech from the Chairperson of the World Scout Committee, João Armando Gonçalves. Entertainment shows included a small find-the-differences game played on the screens, and a traditional taiko drum performance by the "da da da band". The closing ceremony was held in the evening of 7 August 2015, and was broadcast live online at www.scout.org.

== Activities ==
Activities include Nature, Culture, Science, Faith and Beliefs, Global Development Village, Water, Peace, and Community.

=== Water ===
For the all day off-site module, water activities such as sailing, wind surfing, snorkeling, rafting and fishing were carried out at the pool and on the nearby coast.

A half day on-site module was also available, with beachside activities such as volleyball, soccer, sand biking, tug-of-war, and water gun fights being carried out at the beach.

=== Community ===
A full day module, participants could compare their own community to another community. This programme included practical implementation of the "Reaching Out" strategy in the local community. Participants were also able to experience the real Japan by working with local people.

=== Peace ===
An all day off-site module that took participants to the Hiroshima Peace Memorial Museum about two hours' drive away, where the participants could understand and feel the history of what happened on August 6, 1945. There was also a small gathering to hear the memoirs and poems by the survivors of Hiroshima, followed by an invitation for participants to come onstage and share their thoughts on peace.

On 6 August 2015, two participants from each national contingent took part in a ceremony in Hiroshima to mark the 70th anniversary of the atomic bombings of Hiroshima and Nagasaki.

=== Global Development Village ===
Global Development Village (GDV) was an on-site module programme, which attempted to raise awareness of global issues such as peace, the environment, development, human rights and health among participants. As the 23WSJ was held in Japan, GDV focuses on disaster mitigation and world peace. The World Scout Organization requested active involvement of UN agencies, NGOs and NPOs. The GDV programme was also part of the Join-in-Jamboree programme.

=== Nature ===
A full day module programme, it was an attempt to foster better understanding of the surrounding nature, bringing appreciation to the environment. It was held in nearby Yamaguchi City where the Kirarahama cave is.

=== Culture ===
"Crossroads of Culture" (CRC) was an activity to promote the exchange of cultures, and learning respect for the cultures amongst participants. The event also had a programme aimed at deepening the cultural understanding of Japan from traditional culture to pop culture among the participants.

=== Science ===
An on-site programme that aimed at deepening the understanding of advances in science and technology, and the benefits and problems associated with science. This programme provided a venue for learning about the development of fuel cells and other energy sources for the future, ecological problems, robotics and automotive technologies.

== Media ==
The event made use of a number of internal media outlets. There were dedicated video and social media teams and a daily Jamboree Newspaper, titled 和 Wa.

=== Young Correspondent/Young Spokesperson project ===
In addition to dedicated IST members, there were around 200 young correspondents from around the camp working with the media center of the jamboree. They may have chosen to communicate with the press of their own country, to write about the jamboree on their own online blogs or social media using the hashtag #WSJ2015, or write daily themed articles for the jamboree newspaper.

== Football ==
The 23rd World Scout Jamboree hosted its first Scout World Cup which was held in a knockout tournament format. The final was played between Scouts from Brazil and the Merseyside & the Isle of Man Unit from the United Kingdom. The Merseyside unit won 4–1. The first victory since 1966.

== Logo ==
"The Jamboree logo is in the form of a knot (traditional Japanese mizuhiki). The three colors represent the Jamboree concepts: "Energy, Innovation and Harmony". The mizuhiki knot is presented at times of celebration. The kanji character "和" [WA] also forms art of the logo." It is said that the motion of the knot represents the bond between people, to create the bond between the Scouts gathered from all over the world. On the lower right side of the logo, the kanji character "和" [WA] illustrates the meaning of the mizuhiki.

== Collaborations ==
The World Scout Jamboree worked with Canon, a main sponsor. Four live action cameras were set around the camp, and Canon had a stall in the science activity module. The company also lent out 10 EOS kissx8i DSLR cameras (currently not on the market) to the young correspondent program.

== Subcamps ==
Each Jamboree hub contained four subcamps, each consisting of 2,000 scouts with their own programme of activities. The subcamps were named after notable mountains in Japan. Within the subcamps each unit consisted of 4 patrols; a patrol consisting of 9 youth and 1 adult. The three hubs were:

- Northern Hub
  - Akagi
  - Bandai
  - Chokai
  - Daisetsu
- Western Hub
  - Ishizuchi
  - Jakuchi
  - Kujū
  - Miyanoura
- Eastern Hub
  - Ena
  - Fuji
  - Goryu
  - Hotaka

The adult-only Hub for IST members and other adults not affiliated with a Sub-camp or participant unit had its own programme of activities :

- Southern Hub
  - Zaō

== Participation ==
	Male	Female	Total
Scouts	14,144	8,752	22,896
Unit Leaders	1,795	958	2,753
ISTs	4,539	2,455	6,994
CMTs	703	282	985
Total	21,181	12,447	33,628

== See also ==
- Scout Association of Japan
- Scouting in Japan
