= Max I. Silber =

American businessman and Distinguished Eagle Scout (1911–2004)

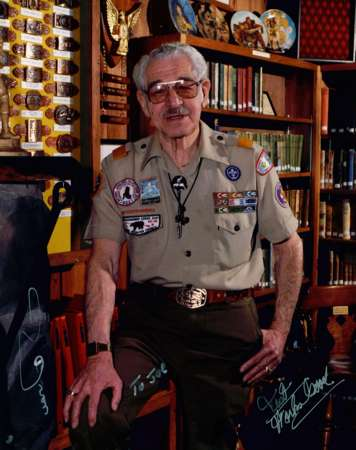
- Born: February 15, 1911
- Died: June 15, 2004 (aged 93)
- Awards: Distinguished Eagle Scout Award; Silver Buffalo Award; Silver Antelope; Silver Beaver; Vigil Honor Order of the Arrow

Max I. Silber (February 15, 1911 – June 15, 2004) was an American businessman from New Hampshire who through his philanthropic works became not only a formative figure for Boy Scouting in New Hampshire, but a distinguished citizen of his home state. A devout Jew, Silber was an active supporter of religious Scouting programs, and was distinguished not just by the Jewish Committee of Scouting, but by the Roman Catholic Committee on Scouting as well. Perhaps the most famous endeavor of Silber's was the development of his "friendship gifts" which were most commonly belt buckles made of bronze. These buckles have evolved into popular Scouting collectibles.

== Early life ==
Max I. Silber was born in Manchester, New Hampshire, in 1911. At the age of 14, he became a member of Boy Scout Troop 1 in Manchester. Silber earned his Eagle Scout in 1926, the Explorer Scout Ranger Award, and was recognized as a Vigil Honor member of the Order of the Arrow in 1958.

== Personal life ==
Max married Edith Kamenske in June 1934. Their marriage lasted 65 years until her death in May 2000. One of their children, Allan, succeeded Max as the president of Kamenske & Company, but died after a long battle with Hodgkin's lymphoma in August 2003. Silber was a 60-year member of Ancient York Lodge #89, Free & Accepted Masons, in Nashua, N.H. Silber died on June 15, 2004, in Nashua, New Hampshire. He is buried along with his wife Edith and son Allan at the Temple Beth Abraham Cemetery in Nashua, New Hampshire.

== Scouting ==
After 1929 Max became a Scout leader, eventually becoming a Scoutmaster. During his tenure, Silber influenced the lives of many young adults including future U.S. Senator Warren Rudman. His involvement with Scouting beyond his troop was extensive, holding many positions, including unit commissioner, district commissioner, council commissioner, district chairman and council president. He was a member of the council executive board for 65 years. Silber served as the Region One chairman in 1957 and on regional jamboree committees in 1960, 1964, 1969, 1973, and 1977. He also served on the Jewish Relationships Committee of the BSA National Council and on the National Jewish Committee on Scouting.

In recognition of Silber's service, he was awarded the Silver Beaver, Silver Antelope, and Silver Buffalo awards and the Distinguished Eagle Scout Award. He was also awarded both the Jewish Shofar award, and the Roman Catholic St. George Award as testament to his hard work to promote Scouting to those of any faith.

== Buckles for Friendship ==
Silber became known in Scouting circles for his belt buckles. In 1950, he was chosen to be a Scoutmaster for the National Scout Jamboree. He was in the metal ingot business and had souvenir buckles produced for the event which he gave out as friendship gifts. Over the next half century, he made fifty more buckles for state, national, and world Scout jamborees, as well as for other special occasions. Additionally, he created recognition buckles for significant awards such as Eagle Scout, Vigil Honor, and Wood Badge. His buckles have become world-famous and are considered highly prized collector's items.

The tradition of creating buckles was carried on by the museum he founded, the Lawrence L. Lee Scouting Museum, in cooperation with his daughter, Natalie Weil of Southport, North Carolina, and artist Rob Hoitt, formerly of Manchester. They produced two official "Max" buckles (2005, 2007). Starting in the 1990s (though there are some earlier examples), Silber started the tradition of offering two versions of each buckle. One version was made from a nickel-silver bronze, and issued as a collector's edition of the buckle. The second, was generally offered in red bronze and issued as a contingent version of the buckle, which for national and world jamborees are given to the contingent of the Daniel Webster Council, any buckles left over after this are also made available to the public in a limited edition. In 2007, Hoitt proposed a one-time change in the tradition of red bronze buckles to commemorate the 100th anniversary of Scouting's founding. The contingent buckle for the 21st World Scout Jamboree was made of polished naval brass with a royal blue lacquer.

In 2010, to commemorate the 100th anniversary of the BSA, and the 60th anniversary of Max's buckles, the Lawrence L. Lee Scouting Museum, again in cooperation with his daughter, issued what would be the last Max Silber "event" buckle. The buckle is a replica of the first Max buckle, the "half-moon" cast in 1950, and replacing the 'New Hampshire' was 'BSA,' a Scout fleur-de-lis, and a '100.' A limited supply of the buckles were cast and they were all in red bronze. Each Scout and leader who attended the Centennial Jamboree at Fort A.P. Hill, Virginia, received a buckle as a gift of the museum. The remaining buckles were made available by the museum and sold out by early 2011.

There are also several collectors buckles made to commemorate specific milestones such as Silver Beaver, Eagle Scout, Wood Badge and Order of the Arrow Vigil Honor, or programs such as the Exploring Division, Region One, Northeast Region, and two Camp Carpenter buckles amongst others. Some of these buckles were released in unlimited editions to act as a constant fundraiser to sustain the Lawrence L. Lee Scout Museum where they are exclusively available.

== The buckles ==
Buckle	Year	Event/Honor	Location (If applicable)	Editions†	Quantity
	2007	21st World Scout Jamboree	Brownsea Island, United Kingdom	White Bronze; Naval Brass	100; 150
2005	2005	16th National Scout Jamboree	Fort A.P. Hill, VA	White Bronze; Red Bronze	100; 250
2003	2003	Daniel Webster Council Jamboree	Gunstock Mountain Resort, NH	White Bronze; Red Bronze	100; 300
2003	2002, 2003	20th World Scout Jamboree	Sattahip, Thailand	White Bronze; Red Bronze	50; 300
2001	2001	15th National Scout Jamboree	Fort A.P. Hill, VA	Red Bronze	300
	1999	Daniel Webster Council Jamboree	Gunstock Mountain Resort, NH	White Bronze; Red Bronze	50; 350
	1998, 1999	19th World Scout Jamboree	Picarquín, Chile	Red Bronze	300
	1997	14th National Scout Jamboree	Fort A.P. Hill, VA	Red Bronze	300
	1995	Daniel Webster Council Jamboree	Sunapee Ski Area, NH	White Bronze; Red Bronze	50; 250
1995 Scout World Jamboree Max I. Silber belt buckle	1995	18th World Scout Jamboree	Flevoland, Netherlands	White Bronze; Red Bronze	50; 300
	1995	Camp Carpenter 50th Anniversary	Manchester, NH	Red Bronze	500
	1993	13th National Scout Jamboree	Fort A.P. Hill, VA	Red Bronze	550
	1995	Eagle Scout		White Bronze	Unlimited
	1992	Silver Beaver		Silver	Unlimited
	1991	17th World Scout Jamboree	Soraksan, South Korea	Red Bronze	350
	1991	Commissioner's Buckle (Re-Release)	Daniel Webster Council	Red Bronze	200
	1989	Museum/Library 20th Anniversary		Red Bronze	Unlimited
	1989	Vigil Honor		Red Bronze	Unlimited
	1989	12th National Scout Jamboree	Fort A.P. Hill, VA	Red Bronze	1300
	1987/88	16th World Scout Jamboree US Contingent	Sydney, Australia	Red Bronze	500
	1987/88	16th World Scout Jamboree	Sydney, Australia	Red Bronze	1200
	1988	"Adventure '88"; Daniel Webster Council Jamboree	Sunapee Ski Area NH	Red Bronze	1000
	1985	Eagle Scout		Red Bronze	Unlimited
	1985	11th National Scout Jamboree	Fort A.P. Hill, VA	Red Bronze	1400
	1985	14th Australian National Scout Jamboree	Cataract Scout Park Australia	Red Bronze	125
	1984	Daniel Webster Council Jamboree	Hopkinton Fairgrounds, NH	Red Bronze	1200
	1983	15th World Scout Jamboree	Calgary, Canada	Red Bronze	1100
	1981	10th National Scout Jamboree	Fort A.P. Hill, VA	Red Bronze	1200
	1981	Commissioner's Buckle	Daniel Webster Council	Red Bronze	300
	1979	15th World Scout Jamboree	Nishapur, Iran	Red Bronze	100*
	1979	Exploring		Red Bronze	100
	1977	9th National Scout Jamboree	Moraine State Park, PA	Red Bronze	1450
	1977	All Out for Scouting		Red Bronze	400
	1976	Wood Badge		Red Bronze	Unlimited
	1976	Northeast Region		White Bronze; Red Bronze	125; 125
	1975	14th World Scout Jamboree	Lillehammer, Norway	Red Bronze	1100
	1974	Silver Buffalo		Silver	25
	1973	Lawrence L. Lee Museum		Red Bronze	Unlimited
	1973	8th National Scout Jamboree	Farragut State Park, ID & Moraine State Park, PA	Red Bronze	2000
	1972	Daniel Webster Council Boypower		Red Bronze	350
	1971	13th World Scout Jamboree	Fujinomiya, Japan	Red Bronze	700
	1970	Camp Carpenter 25th Anniversary	Manchester, NH	Red Bronze	350
	1969	7th National Scout Jamboree	Farragut State Park, ID	Red Bronze	1000
	1967	12th World Scout Jamboree	Farragut State Park, ID	Red Bronze	1000
	1964	6th National Scout Jamboree	Valley Forge, PA	Red Bronze	1000
	1964	1964 New York World's Fair		Red Bronze	400
	1960	5th National Scout Jamboree	Colorado Springs, CO	Red Bronze	800
	1957	4th National Scout Jamboree	Valley Forge, PA	White Bronze; Red Bronze	50; 750
	1955	Region One		Red Bronze	500
	1955	8th World Scout Jamboree	Niagara-on-the-Lake, Canada	Red Bronze	700
	1953	3rd National Scout Jamboree	Irvine Ranch, CA	Red Bronze	800
	1950	2nd National Scout Jamboree	Valley Forge, PA	Red Bronze	700

† There may also exist "flat cast" test samples or limited variations in metals used for testing purposes, as these were not considered "official." In the cases of the 1950 and 1953 National Jamborees, there was an initial run in brass as well; which according to folklore was made from the many .22 shells littering the ground in the rifle range at Camp Carpenter. * The 1979 Iran buckles were for the most part melted down. The number reflected is of those that are known to remain.

== The museum and library ==
The Lawrence L. Lee Scouting Museum, established in 1969, was a place for Max to display Scouting Memorabilia that he acquired during his many trips nationally and internationally in the service of Scouting, including many items related to Lord Robert Baden-Powell, the founder of the Scouting Movement, and his wife Lady Olave Baden-Powell, with whom he was personally acquainted. In 1978, a Scouting Library was named for him to honor his contributions to Scouting and the community. The museum has grown through donations from Scouters, families of Scouters and visitors to include one of the largest collections of Scouting memorabilia. The museum has also traditionally hosted a Jamboree on the Air station, as well as hosting the New England Tradeoree each fall.

== Professional life ==
Professionally, Max was the President of Kamenske & Company, a manufacturer of brass and bronze ingots.

== Honors ==
- Brandeis University in Waltham, MA confers the Max I. Silber Award to the university’s outstanding female student-athlete.
- The United Way of Greater Nashua, NH confers The Max I. Silber Community Service Award to members of the community who exemplify the ideals of community service and volunteerism.
- The National Eagle Scout Association chapter for New Hampshire is named The Max I. Silber Chapter.
- Camp Carpenter in Manchester, NH has a campsite named "Silber" in his honor.
- Max was awarded the Daniel Carter Beard Masonic Scouter Award in 2002 by the members of his lodge, Ancient York Lodge #89, F&AM and presented the award by the Grand Master of Masons in New Hampshire at the time, Most Worshipful Brother Wendell Lear Woodward.
- In 2004, Just after his death, the New Hampshire Scouting Service Club acquired the Amateur Radio Callsign 'N1S' (S being for Silber) for use during its Jamboree On The Air station, and dedicated the event to his memory. The club still uses the call each October to this day.
