= Griswold Scout Reservation =

Coordinates: 43°28′37″N 71°19′23″W

- "The Land Made for Scouting"
- Owner: Scouting America New Hampshire
- Age range: Scouts BSA - 11-17; Venturing - 14-20
- Location: 254 Griswold Lane; Gilmanton Ironworks, New Hampshire 03837
- Country: United States
- Founded: 1971
- Head Ranger: Bryan Boyajian
- Reservation Director: Amanda Rydlewski
- Camp Director: Scott Rodrigue
- Website nhscouting.org

Griswold Scout Reservation (GSR) is a 3,500-acre (14 km^{2}) reservation for Scouting located near Gilmanton Ironworks, New Hampshire, and operated by the New Hampshire Council of the Boy Scouts of America. It comprises two camps, Hidden Valley Scout Camp and Camp Bell, which both ran an eight-week summer camping program. As of 2025 GSR has been running as one defined camp which runs a seven-week Scouts BSA summer camp program. Founded in 1971, Griswold Scout Reservation serves Venturing crews and Scouts BSA troops all across New England.

== History ==
=== Camp Manning ===
In 1925, the Manchester Council purchased 38 acres (15 ha) on the shores of Guinea Pond (now Lake Manning) in Gilmanton Ironworks, opening Camp Manning. It hosted 144 campers in its inaugural season. When the Manchester Council was replaced by the Daniel Webster Council in 1929, it was decided to continue to use Camp Manning as the primary camp. In 1932, Camp Manning expanded an additional 100 acres (0.40 km^{2}), allowing 305 campers to utilize the camp.

As Scouting's numbers continued to increase, it was determined that Camp Manning would no longer be able to accommodate the continuing growth. The Daniel Webster Council moved all summer programs to Camp Carpenter in Manchester, New Hampshire. In 1945, the decision was made to sell Camp Manning. Four years later, in 1949, Camp Manning was sold to an independent church group, which opened Camp Leo.

=== Hidden Valley and Camp Bell ===
On the nearby property, the Norumbega Council (based in Waban, Massachusetts, now a part of the Mayflower Council) opened Hidden Valley Scout Reservation. The Norumbega Council operated Hidden Valley from 1961 to 1970. After struggles to maintain the property, the Daniel Webster Council purchased Hidden Valley in the fall of 1970. Shortly after, an additional 1,000 acres (4.0 km^{2}) were added to the property. The purchase was made possible through the generosity of Earle A. Griswold, a supporter of the Daniel Webster Council. The name of the property remained the same, Hidden Valley Scout Reservation. It opened for its first season in 1971.

In 1988, Camp Leo closed. Despite a long run, Camp Leo mostly flourished in the 1950s-'60s. The Daniel Webster Council purchased the property again in 1990. This property was incorporated into the existing camp. Around this same time period, Hidden Valley Scout Reservation became the Griswold Hidden Valley Scout Reservation, in remembrance of Earle A. Griswold.

In 2000, Camp Bell, a second camp on the property, was established, utilizing the former land of Camp Leo and Camp Manning. The camp is named for the support of Daniel Webster Council Executive Board Member Ernest "Tutt" Bell III. Due to the creation of Camp Bell, Griswold Hidden Valley Scout Reservation's name was simplified to Griswold Scout Reservation. The two camps on the Griswold Scout Reservation are now Hidden Valley Scout Camp and Camp Bell.

=== Camp Sno-Mo ===
In 1989, a unique, "first-in-the-nation" partnership was formed between Easter Seals of New Hampshire and the Daniel Webster Council. Griswold Scout Reservation became home to the "Easter Seals Lodge", which was built alongside an accompanying campsite in 1991. Together, they compose Camp Sno-Mo (named for their primary donor, the NH Snowmobile Association). Campers with a variety of disabilities begin to mainstream into Scouting and other specialized programming at GSR. Many new programs for Scouts, including the Disabilities Awareness Merit Badge, are offered as part of this new partnership.

== Landscape ==
Griswold Scout Reservation is situated in the Lakes Region of New Hampshire. The property extends through the towns of Alton, Gilford, and Gilmanton and covers over 3,500 acres (14 km^{2}) of forest, lakes, and mountains.

Griswold Scout Reservation is situated in the Belknap Mountain Range. Six mountain peaks are located on the property, Mt. Klem, Mt. Anna, Mt. Mack, Mt. Shannon, Lookout Knob, and Goat Pasture Hill. The property includes three lakes, which are Sunset Lake, Manning Lake, and Lake Eileen. Both Manning Lake and Sunset Lake are public bodies of water, while Lake Eileen is owned by Griswold Scout Reservation. GSR is surrounded by remote wilderness on most sides, with hiking trails leading to nearby Gunstock Mountain or Belknap Mountain State Forest. Several ponds, four swamps, caves, rock faces, and many hills are situated across the reservation.

Several points of interest exist across the property, including the site of a 19th-century iron mine, a plane wreck from 1973, and a quarry site from the 1800s.

In 1991, a conservation easement held by the New Hampshire Fish and Game Department was placed on the entirety of Griswold Scout Reservation. Due to this, public use of the property is authorized year-round. The property welcomes hiking, horseback riding, trail running, fishing, and non-motorized boating. In addition, snowmobile use is allowed in the winter. However, certain areas will be restricted during the summer season.

In 2016, Griswold Scout Reservation and the Daniel Webster Council were awarded the "2016 Outstanding Community Tree Farmer of the Year". The Griswold Scout Reservation exemplifies sound forest management and long-term forest stewardship.

== Hidden Valley Scout Camp ==
Hidden Valley Scout Camp is overseen by a Camp Director, Head Commissioner, and Program Director.

=== Facilities ===
Hidden Valley features sixteen established campsites of varying sizes. Campsites feature canvas walled tents which rest on raised, wooden platforms. Each campsite is equipped with a latrine, with two large shower houses spread among the camp.

The Gilbert Dining Hall, which was built in 1997, serves Scouts three "family style" meals a day. It is capable of seating 620 people. Hidden Valley also features a campfire & ceremony amphitheater capable of seating 850 (completed in 2016), and Carter Lodge, which is used for training or meeting purposes, along with a leader's lounge.(A small fire happened in Carter Lodge in 2023 and repairs were being done during 2025.) A 24-hour health lodge, trading post, and recently renovated chapel are available for Scouts. The chapel is dedicated to Marc P. Decoteau who was killed in action in Afghanistan while serving in the army. He was an eagle scout in Troop 56. The majority of these facilities are available for both scout and non-scout groups throughout the calendar year when summer camp is not in session.

=== Programs ===
Hidden Valley is run as a traditional Scout camp with full dining facilities and a wide variety of program areas and activities. Over 60 merit badges are able to be earned by Scouts, along with various training opportunities for Scouters. Three hour-long merit-badge blocks take place after breakfast, with troops participating in various activities after lunch. After dinner, many program areas open for camp-wide activities, often going into the night.

Programs include a high ropes courses as part of the COPE program, a 12-station archery range, a 16-station rifle/pistol range, an automated trap shooting range, two waterfronts (Chase, and Main) with swimming and boating of all kinds on Lake Eileen, and any of the various week-long high-adventure treks.

An annual week-long National Youth Leadership Training course takes place at Hidden Valley.

== Camp Bell ==
Camp Bell is overseen by a Camp Director, Head Commissioner, and Program Director. Camp Bell is run with a higher emphasis on strengthening the Patrol Method.

=== Facilities ===
Camp Bell features seven campsites, which are named after various mountains in New Hampshire. They are nearly identical to those of Hidden Valley. The Camp Bell Main Lodge features a health lodge, trading post, camp office, and commissary. A "safety pavilion" was built on the property after numerous Scouts were injured in a lightning strike in 2013. Recently, several primitive Adirondack shelters were built. The majority of these facilities are available for both scout and non-scout groups throughout the calendar year when summer camp is not in session.

=== Programs ===
Camp Bell is run with a higher emphasis on strengthening the Patrol Method. Campers do their own cooking in their sites and participate in day-long living-history activities as patrols. Patrols can focus on blacksmithing, logging, snorkeling, water-skiing, or various shooting sports. Camp Bell features an indoor rock climbing barn, an all-terrain vehicle hub with a one-acre, terrain-neutral training site, a 200-seat campfire circle, and a functioning farm. It is ideal for an older-scout bracket. Camp Bell includes various thematic program areas including Challenge Valley (an extreme obstacle course), Mountain Man (muzzleloaders & sporting clays), Brownsea (outdoor skills area), Logging Camp (lumberjack), and Foxfire (blacksmithing).

Due to declining numbers of campers in 2024 Camp Bell has been absorbed into the Hidden Valley summer camp program and does not run as a separate camp.

== Other history ==
GSR is one of the first Boy Scouts of America properties to utilize a year-round forester, helping implement good forest management practices.

In 2013, 23 Scouts were transported to nearby hospitals after a lightning strike at Camp Bell. They had non-life-threatening injuries. They were a part of the National Youth Leadership Training course.

Due to the COVID-19 pandemic, all Daniel Webster Council summer camps were closed for the entirety of the 2020 season.

In June 2023, an 11-year-old Scout from Lexington Massachusetts died in a boating accident on Manning Lake.

December 2023 Carter Lodge, the former dining hall of Hidden Valley, experienced an electrical fire resulting in the complete loss of the building.

February 2025, Daniel Webster Council rebranded as Scouting America New Hampshire

As of 2025 Griswold Scout Reservation only runs as one camp offering both Hidden Valley and Camp Bell style programs. Troops have the option to participate in the Dining Hall or Patrol Cooking experiences while at camp.
