= Scouting in Iran =

Scouting Organizations in Iran

Scouting in Iran is served by

- the Iran Scout Organization

and was previously served by

- the Dokhtarān-e Pīshāhang-e Īrān (Iranian Scouting Girl Scout Section)
