= LTSR =

LTSR may refer to:

- Lithuanian Soviet Socialist Republic (Lithuanian: Lietuvos Tarybų Socialistinė Respublika)
- London, Tilbury and Southend Railway, an English former railway company
  - London, Tilbury and Southend line, a railway line
  - LTS Rail, a post-privatisation train operating company, later renamed c2c (1996–2025)
- Lone Tree Scout Reservation
