= Manchester Council =

Manchester Council may refer to:

- Manchester City Council, the local government authority for the city of Manchester, UK
- Greater Manchester County Council, the top-tier local government administrative body for Greater Manchester from 1974 to 1986
- Manchester Council (New Hampshire), division of the Boy Scouts of America serving New Hampshire
