= Lion Scout =

Lion Scout can refer to several ranks in Scout organizations around the world:

- Lion Scout, the highest rank in The Kenya Scouts Association
- Lion Scout, the highest rank in the Iran Scout Organization until 1979
- Lion Scout rank in the Scouts of China
- Lion Scout, a rank in the Cub Scouting program of the Boy Scouts of America
