= Rutland County Council (disambiguation) =

Rutland County Council is a council in England.

Rutland County Council may also refer to:

- Rutland County Council (Vermont), United States
- Rutland Scout County (The Scout Association), England
