= Spirit of Adventure Council =

Regional Boy Scouts council in Massachusetts, U.S.

- Headquarters: Woburn, MA
- Location: Greater Boston Area
- Country: United States
- Founded: July 1, 2015
- Founders: Boston Minuteman Council and Yankee Clipper Council
- Membership: 18,000+
- Scout Executive: John Judge
- Website www.scoutspirit.org

The Spirit of Adventure Council is a regional council of Scouting America. It serves the greater Boston, Massachusetts, area.

== History ==
The Yankee Clipper Council and Boston Minuteman Council merged on July 1, 2015. As part of this merger, New Hampshire towns of the former Yankee Clipper Council were transferred to the Daniel Webster Council, headquartered in Manchester.

=== Boston Minuteman Council ===
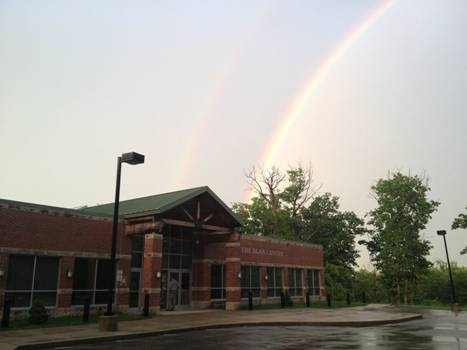
Egan Center

In 1993, the Boston Minuteman Council #227 was formed from the merger of Minuteman Council #240 (Stoneham, 1959–1993) and the Greater Boston Council #227 (Boston, 1980–1993), formerly Boston Council #227 (1921-1980 when only the name changed).

In 1966, the Quincy Council (Quincy, Massachusetts) (1918–1966) merged with the Boston Council.

In 1959, the Minuteman Council (Stoneham, 1959–1993) was formed from a merger of Sachem Council #223 (Lexington, 1926–1959), Fellsland Council #242 (Winchester, 1932–1959), and Quannopowitt Council #240 (Malden, 1993-1959).

The Cambridge Council #229 (Cambridge, 1919–2001) and their Kahagon Order of the Arrow Lodge #131 were merged into the Boston Minuteman Council in 2001.

=== Yankee Clipper Council ===
Yankee Clipper Council {{#236}} was formed from a merger of the North Essex Council, North Bay Council, and Lone Tree Council in 1993. The Greater Lowell Council merged with Yankee Clipper in 2000, choosing it over three adjacent councils. The Greater Lowell District formed the fifth spoke on the ship's wheel totem of the YCC council strip. The council operated two camps in its final years: Wah-Tut-Ca Scout Reservation, a Boy Scout camp, and Lone Tree Scout Reservation for Cub Scouts and Boy Scouts, after selling Camp Onway in 2007.

== Organization ==
The council is divided into the following districts:

- Flintlock District (includes the communities of Bedford, Burlington, Carlisle, Concord, Hanscom AFB, Lexington, Lincoln, North Reading, Reading, Stoneham, Wakefield, Winchester, and Woburn)
- Sons of Liberty District (includes the communities of Arlington, Belmont, Cambridge, Charlestown, Chelsea, East Boston, Everett, Malden, Medford, Melrose, Revere, Somerville, Waltham and Watertown)
- Great Blue Hill District (includes the communities of Allston, Back Bay, Beacon Hill, Brighton, Brookline, Dedham, Dorchester, Dover, Hyde Park, Islington, Jamaica Plain, Mattapan, Milton, Needham, Quincy, Roslindale, Roxbury, South Boston, West Roxbury, Westwood)
- West Wind District (includes the communities of Andover, Billerica, Chelmsford, Dracut, Dunstable, Lawrence, Lowell, Tewksbury, Tyngsborough, Westford, and Wilmington)
- Northern Light District (includes the communities of Amesbury, Georgetown, Groveland, Haverhill, Ipswich, Merrimac, Methuen, Newbury, Newburyport, North Andover, Rowley, Salisbury, and West Newbury)
- The Great Eastern District (includes the communities of Beverly, Boxford, Danvers, Essex, Gloucester, Hamilton, Lynn, Lynnfield, Manchester-by-the-Sea, Marblehead, Middleton, Nahant, Peabody, Rockport, Salem, Saugus, Swampscott, Topsfield, Wenham, and Winthrop)

== Camps ==
Wah-Tut-Ca Scout Reservation
- Location: Northwood, New Hampshire
- Country: United States
- Coordinates: 43.2084°N 71.2305°W
- Founded: July 1, 2015
- Founder: Greater Lowell Council
- Website www.scoutspirit.org

It has several camps:

- New England Base Camp (formerly Camp Sayre), in the Blue Hills Reservation, Milton, Massachusetts
- T.L. Storer Scout Reservation in Barnstead, New Hampshire (part of the Northern NeXus)
- Parker Mountain Scout Reservation in Strafford, New Hampshire (part of the Northern NeXus)
- Wah-Tut-Ca Scout Reservation in Northwood, New Hampshire (part of the Northern NeXus)

== Order of the Arrow ==
Pennacook Lodge is the Order of the Arrow lodge chartered to the Spirit of Adventure Council, Boy Scouts of America. Established January 1, 2016, it was formed as a result of the merger between its two predecessor lodges: Moswetuset Lodge (Boston Minuteman Council) and Nanepashemet Lodge (Yankee Clipper Council).

== Gallery ==
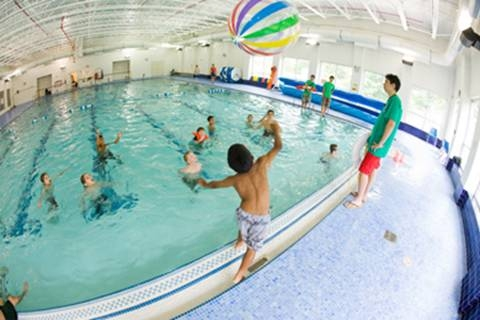
New England Base Camp Pool

== See also ==
- Scouting in Massachusetts
- Scouting in New Hampshire
