= Ajapeu Lodge =

Ajapeu Lodge is the Order of the Arrow lodge in two local councils of the Boy Scouts of America:

- Ajapeu Lodge (Washington Crossing Council)
- Ajapeu Lodge (Green Mountain Council)
