= Hossein Banai =

Iranian scouting leader

- Occupations: educator, illustrator and cartoonist
- Known for: Served on the World Scout Committee of the World Organization of the Scout Movement

Under the direction of Hossein Banai (Persian: حسین بنایی), Iranian Scouting became a member of the World Bureau of the World Organization of the Scout Movement for the second time in 1955.

Banai served on the World Scout Committee of the World Organization of the Scout Movement from 1959 until 1965 and again from 1967 until 1973.

In 1965, Banai was awarded the Bronze Wolf, the only distinction of the World Organization of the Scout Movement, awarded by the World Scout Committee for exceptional services to world Scouting.
