= Camp Onway =

Coordinates: 43.0354°N 71.209°W

Camp Onway, in Raymond, Rockingham County, New Hampshire, on the shores of Onway Lake, was a property owned by local councils of the Boy Scouts of America. The site is now known as Zion's Camp and has been owned by the Church of Jesus Christ of Latter-day Saints (LDS Church) since 2007.

== History ==
Lake Onway was named after the Native American leader, Passaconaway, a 17th century sachem and bashaba (chief of chiefs) who led the Pennacook people.

Camp Onway consisted of nine campsites: Abnaki, Algonquin (Provo), Jacunda, New Magee, Old Magee, Pedhela, and Travers. The other two campsites, Gillwell Fields and Nawachapo, were being used by Scoutcraft and the Woodsman program. The "hill" consisted of six cabins that housed the junior staff and the "Hill Patrol". The senior staff were housed in four cabins: the Screenhouse, the Lawrence Cabin, the Andovers Cabin, and the Methuen Cabin. The director and program director were in Cabin 13, also known as the Director's cabin.

This land has been used as a camping place since 1900. The first camp was a county YMCA camp for boys. The YMCA used the Pine Grove, located at approximately the center of the waterfront property. For five to ten years the YMCA shared this land for one month with the Girls Work Community Council of Exeter. They operated together until 1924, at which time the county YMCA purchased a camp site in Kingston. The Girls Work Community Council operated the land until 1929.

In 1929, the North Essex Council consisting of Lawrence, Methuen, Andover, and North Andover purchased the land for $4,400. A mortgage of $2,700 was held by Burchard E. Horne who, through his contribution, liquidated the entire amount. The mortgage was burned at the tenth anniversary of Camp Onway, July 21, 1940. The dining hall was named for Horne, in recognition of his interest in Scouting.

When the camp opened in 1930, there were two troop campsites. The first was Abnacki, which came from the Native American Abenaki tribe who were ruled by Passaconaway. The second was Pedhela, whose name was taken from the two presidents of North Essex Council, William Peddler and James Hennessey, and from the chairman of the Camping Committee, Stanley Lane: PEDdler + HEnnessey + LAne = PEDHELA.

In 1930, the St. James cabin was built. It is the oldest standing building in camp today. As the camp grew, so did the facilities. Between 1940 and 1945, the cabin just uphill from the dining hall (cabin 7) and the George Wilson Lodge (before 1998 this was the Health Lodge) were built. A new road was added to make travel in and out of camp easier. In 1964, the Camp Ranger's house burned down and was rebuilt along with a new maintenance building. In the years to follow, more additions were made such as the shower facilities, rifle and archery ranges, the Catholic chapel, and the Charrette Activity Center and Takesian Memorials. The kitchen was rebuilt and the dining hall was modernized in 1971 after fire struck again. Other additions include the staff cabins, the expansion of the waterfront area, an increase in the conservation practices, including multi-land use, and a Wood Badge/Leadership Development area.

In 1989, Onway's 60th anniversary, Camp Onway and North Essex Council welcomed the North Bay Council in the first year of a shared camping venture between the two councils. In the following years improvements were made to the campsite latrines, the Trail Center was converted to become the new Commissary/Trading Post, and renovations were made to the central shower house and Magee Lodge. In 1992, thanks to a $20,000 gift from the George W. Magee Trust Fund, a floating swimming dock system was added to the waterfront.

On January 1, 1993, North Essex Council, North Bay Council, and Lone Tree Council merged to form the new Yankee Clipper Council. A joint camp use committee decided to concentrate the council's summer Boy Scout program at Camp Onway and move all Cub and Webelos programs to Lone Tree Scout Reservation.

The Friends of Onway contributed $70,000 to expand and renovate the dining hall to a first-class facility in 1994. Additional improvements included construction of a parking lot, a redesigning of the rifle range, and renovations to the newly dedicated Rheaume Nature Lodge. A new latrine was added to the waterfront and another was built in 1996 at the rifle range. 1997 saw the construction of a new storage shed for the Archery Range as well as a weather shelter. In 1998 a new health lodge was constructed and later named the Robert Mundry Health Lodge at the June 2000 council annual meeting. Also in 1998 the waterfront lookout tower was rebuilt, and a new walk-in freezer was added to the kitchen.

The summer of 2007 marked the last at Camp Onway before it was sold to the LDS Church.

== Sale ==
In 2005 the Properties Study Committee started reviewing all council camp properties to determine the best use of assets for the sustainability of the scouting program in the council's service area as part of the long-term strategic planning process. A recommendation to sell the Camp Onway property was eventually forwarded to the Yankee Clipper Council executive board.

The sale was met with a large amount of opposition from Scouts, Scouters and staff members. Numerous arguments were presented to reject the sale. A petition was signed by over 1,000 Scouts, Scouters, and friends of Scouting. Many of the articles are available at SaveCampOnway.com.

At a meeting on March 22, the Yankee Clipper Council (YCC) executive board voted 26-10 in favor of selling Camp Onway. The sale, originally set to take place in late August, was delayed due to controversy surrounding the original deed from 1929. After a drawn-out legal debate as to whether the YCC had the right to sell the camp, it was decided that they did. More than seven months after the initial vote, the YCC was contacted by the LDS Church, saying that because of the declining property market, they must lower the price of $2.8 million to $2.45 million. The YCC immediately had a vote to push the sale through.

On November 30, 2007, Camp Onway was sold to the LDS Church for $2.45 million, which the YCC put into an endowment fund. The new owners have since changed the name to "Zion's Camp".

== Building projects ==
1929

- Burchard E. Horne Dining Hall — the original structure, consisting of the "main" dining area and kitchen, was on the property at the time of the purchase.
- Saint James Cabin — originally used as the cook's cabin, it is the oldest building in the camp. (Plans to renovate were set forth for the 2006-2007 off-season.)
- Cabin #7 — formerly the Office and Trading Post. It was then used to house junior staff, waterfront staff, or kitchen staff. In 2005, Cabin 7 was turned into the commissioner's office and storage space.
- Craft Barn — A small cabin that was on the property at the time of the purchase. This building was used for many years as a craft shop; it was torn down in the late 1940s.

1940

- George F. Wilson Lodge — until 1999 this building was the Health Lodge. Currently the building is used as a guest lodge. The building was funded in part by the Lawrence Lions Club. It was dedicated in 1940, the 10th anniversary of the summer camp operations at Camp Onway. The burning of the mortgage, which was paid off by Burchard E. Horne, took place during the dedication of the Wilson Lodge.

1945

- Quonset hut — built with government surplus supplies by North Essex volunteers, it now houses the aquatics equipment in the off season.

1946

- Magee Cabin — through the funds from the George Magee Fund, the land from Pulpit Rock to Magee Cabin was obtained. The cabin has been the residence of the Camp Director since it was purchased.
- Aquatics tower — built through donations from the George Magee Fund.
- Steel docks — gift from the Lawrence Lions Club. These docks were originally used for swimming; currently they are used for the boating area.

1948

- Dining hall renovations — the kitchen area was rebuilt through funding provided by the citizens of Greater Lawrence.

1950

- Water line improvements — the first set of four improvements and extensions made to the water line, financed by the George Magee Fund.

1956

- Magee Lodge — originally built as the camp office and trading post, it now serves as a Scoutmaster lounge. In the winter it is an excellent place to warm one's toes after a day in the snow.

1957

- Water line improvements — the second set of improvements, funded by the George Magee Fund.
- Loon Lodge (George Russell Lodge) — built as an interdenominational chapel by the Lawrence Exchange Club and later moved to Onway. It was named after George Russell, who was a Council Commissioner. As the story goes, he died while packing his car to go to Lawrence, Kansas with the Order of the Arrow (OA). The OA was going to perform an Ordeal Ceremony at the National Conference. The project to move the building was led by Ray Sheehan, former Board Member. Today the building houses OA equipment.
- Pump house — until 1998 the building, located on the cement slab next to the amphitheatre, housed a water pump. 1993 was the last year that the fire hoses were set out. The building and pump were a gift from the Lawrence Lions Club.
- Dining Hall fireplace — the fireplace was built through funding provided by the Lawrence Lions Club.

1958

- Ranger's House — the original house and property were purchased in 1958 when Bruno Prevost was Council President.

1960

- George Russell Memorial Chapel — the present outdoor chapel was built in the early 1960s by Henry Bevin and Donald Smith, Chairman of the Lay Committee. It was named in memory of George Russell, who was a Council Commissioner.

1961

- Commissary & Trading Post — originally built as a trading post with funds from Mr. and Mrs. Bruno Prevost. Later it was used as trail center after the Takesian Memorial was built. Today, after many renovations, it serves as the camp's trading post.
- Main Gate Way — funded by the Lawrence Lions Club.
- "Pop Bacon" Road — built by the U.S. Army Reserves and the 879th Corps of Engineers.

1962

- St. George Chapel — funds and labor provided by Monsignor Joseph Burke and St. Patrick's Parish, sponsor of Troop 18. Joe Muzerall was the chairman of the Lay Committee. Named after the patron saint of Scouting, Saint George.

1963

- Ed Rheaume Nature Lodge — funded and built by Shingebis Lodge #490.
- Maintenance Building — built through funding provided by George Magee Fund.
- Jack Ingalls Amphitheatre — planned and built by Jack Ingalls and a "few good boys and men" from Shingebis Lodge #490. The seats are old railroad ties from the Boston and Maine R.R., which used to rumble past the camp.

1964

- Ranger's House — on February 29 the house was completely destroyed by fire. The present house was relocated and rebuilt with funds from an insurance policy. At the time, "Chip" Hastings, a fire chief for Kingston, New Hampshire, was Camp Ranger.

1965

- Water tank — located in Upper Algonquin, the tank holds 10,000 gallons of water which is fed throughout the camp by gravity. The tank was purchased with funds from the George Magee Fund.

1968

- Water line improvements — again improvements were made in the line to accommodate the addition of the new tank.
- Rifle range shelter — original shelter was funded by Stuart Wilson and the Greater Lawrence Auto Parts Dealers.
- A new Trading Post was erected thanks to a donation by Prescott. The camp now had a store.

1969

- Charette Memorial — built as a program pavilion, it was later closed in. Overhead doors were added along with siding to make the building adaptable for winter camping. The back wall of the building (facing Abnaki) covers a foundation for a fireplace that was proposed, but never constructed. Funded and built by Shingebis Lodge #490 for Albert Charette Sr., Assistant Scoutmaster, Troop 14, Lawrence, Massachusetts. "Al" was an avid camper who had a severe heart condition; he died on a Sunday morning, at an OA Ordeal.
- Central Shower Facility
- Lawrence, Andover, North Andover Cabins — built with funds from George Magee Fund for the senior staff.
- Methuen Cabin — built with funds from Durwood Farnsworth, Camping Chairman. Currently a senior staff cabin.
- Lower Shower Facility — built with funds from the George Magee Fund.

1970

- Aquatics Tower — an addition the rear of the building added space for storage and equipment during and after the season, funded by the George Magee Fund. Back room currently houses the Jr. Aquatics Staff during the camping season.

1972

- Dining hall renovations — during the summer of 1971 fire struck the kitchen and the kitchen was renovated to its present size.

1973

- Takesian Building — originally built as a museum/camp office and staff lounge. It is dedicated to Dick Takesian, Scoutmaster of Troop 15, First Calvary Baptist Church, Lawrence, Massachusetts. The constructions was funded by the Takesian family, First Calvary Church, and the Friends of Onway. Today the building is used as the camp's main office and, in the off season, is a cozy winter cabin.

1974

- Junior Staff cabins #1, 2, & 3 — constructed to house the junior staff.
- Cabin #1 — funded by Friends of Onway
- Cabin #2 — funded by Allen B. Roger Foundation
- Cabin #3 — funded by Allen J. Ash Foundation

1984

- George Russell Chapel improvements — the A-frame structure was completed by the Greater Lawrence Council of Churches.

1986

- Baseball backstop — erected in memory of John W. Ramsden, Scoutmaster of Troop 9, Primitive Methodist Church. Funding provided by his family.

1988

- Swimming docks — floating docks were purchased through the George Magee Fund.
- Ingalls Amphitheatre — rededicated to "Jack" Ingalls.

1989

- Maintenance building additions — with the help of the shared Camping Committee, North Essex and North Bay Council, additions were completed.

1990

- Central shower facility renovations — through funding from the George Magee Fund, extensive renovations and improvements were made to the shower house.

1991-92

- Reinhold — Adirondack shelter constructed and dedicated to Reinhold (??).

1994

- Dining Hall renovations — the Friends of Onway contributed $70,000 to expand and renovate the dining hall to a first class dining facility. This project included lifting the building, in two sections, and constructing a foundation underneath, thus creating a basement. In addition, a new wing was added to the building, later dedicated to James B. Coffey. Finally, the fireplace was rebuilt with the original stones by Robert Mundry. An article in the Lawrence Eagle Tribune referenced many more volunteers.
- Parking lot — also funded by the Friends of Onway, the parking lot allowed for less traffic on Onway's roads and created a more rustic appearance during the summer program.

2004

- Troop 60, Methuen, Massachusetts, donated the materials and labor to build a new archery range shelter.

2005

- The Trading Post was remodeled to fit more shelf space and to create a more friendly atmosphere toward the customers.

2006

- A timber cut was held and, as a result, a new parking lot facility was made to the right of the entrance. A sizable clearing was cut behind the berm at the rifle range to make room for a new shotgun range.
