= 15th World Scout Jamboree (cancelled) =

Cancelled 1979 Scout Jamboree in Iran

- 15th World Scout Jamboree
- Location: Nishapur
- Country: Iran
- Date: 1979
- Attendance: cancelled
Previous; 14th World Scout Jamboree	Next; 15th World Scout Jamboree

The 15th World Scout Jamboree (Persian: پانزدهمین گردهمایی جهانی پیشاهنگان) was scheduled to be held 15–23 July 1979 and was to be hosted by Iran at Nishapur, but was cancelled due to the Iranian Revolution which took place in 1979.

== Background ==
The 15th World Jamboree was to be held at the 10 square kilometres (3.9 sq mi) "Omar Khayyám Scout Park" in the city of Nishapur. The Second Asia-Pacific Jamboree was held at the site in preparation, in the summer of 1977. However, the destabilizing events of the Islamic Revolution caused the 15th World Jamboree to be cancelled near the end of 1978.

However, a number of commemorative items had already been made for the event, the demand for which and the value of which was greatly inflated by the Jamboree's cancellation. The few items of memorabilia in existence are of huge value to collectors when they, albeit rarely, come on the market.

The next Jamboree, hosted by Canada in 1983, was named The Spirit Lives On to show how Scouting's spirit of international brotherhood could overcome the setback of cancelling the 1979 Jamboree.

== World Jamboree Year ==
Instead, the World Organization of the Scout Movement announced the "World Jamboree Year" by holding several international World Jamboree Year camps in Australia, Canada, Sweden, Switzerland and the United States that took up the momentum.

== See also ==
- Iranian Scouting Organization
