= Scouting in New Hampshire =

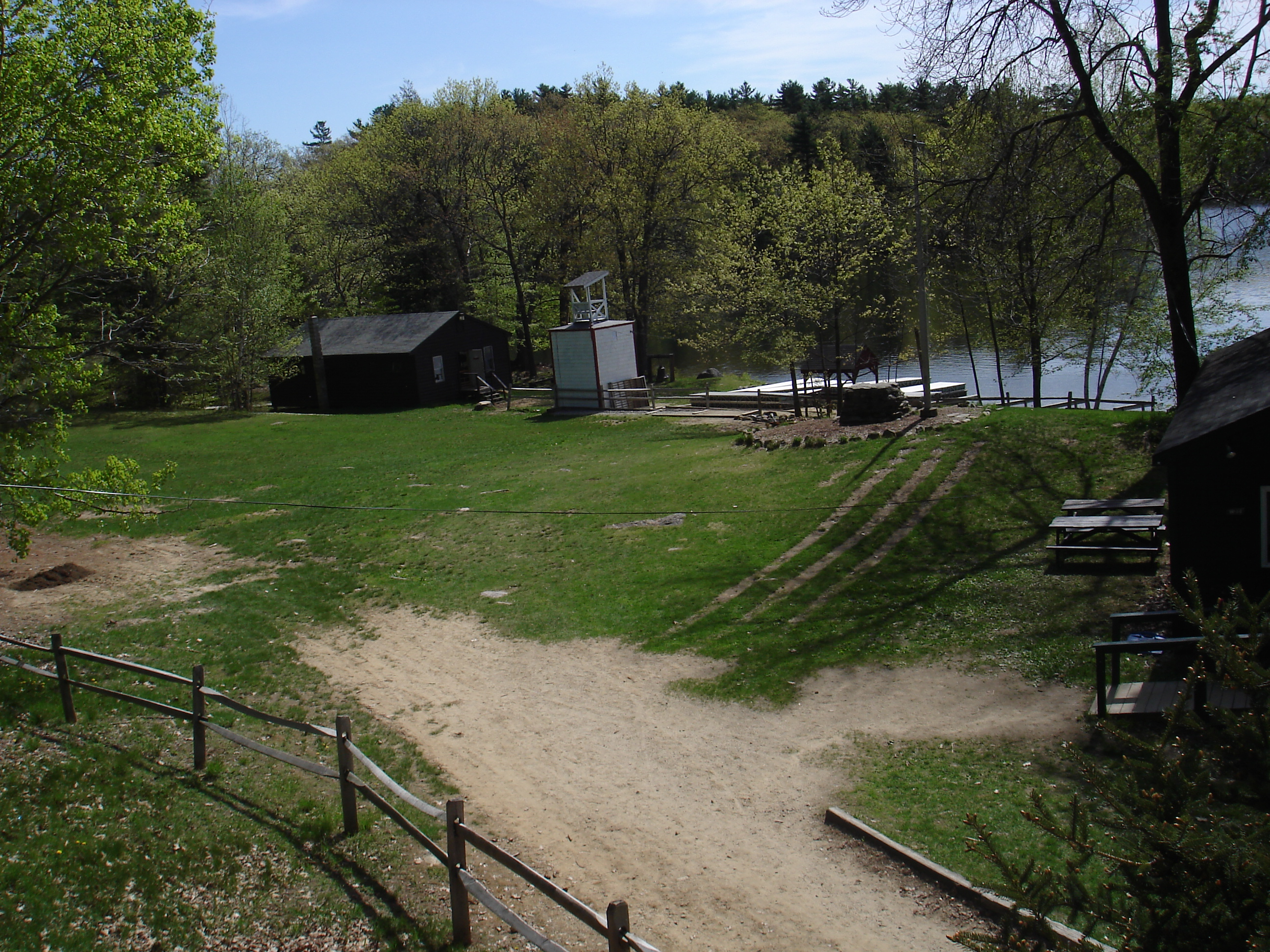
- Camp Wanocksett main field

Scouting in New Hampshire has a long history, from the 1910s to the present day, serving thousands of youth in programs that suit the environment in which they live.

== Early history (1910-1950) ==
In 1912, two years after the Boy Scouts of America (BSA) was founded in the United States, the Manchester Council (#330), a volunteer-led council, was organized. Initially, only two troops were chartered by the YMCA. As Scouting grew in popularity, three more makeshift and unrecognized councils sprang up in Dover, Claremont, and Portsmouth. The council grew steadily and added a Scout Executive to its staff in 1919.

On January 9, 1920, the Manchester Council was granted an official charter with the Boy Scouts of America. At that time, the council represented ten troops and 256 Scouts within Manchester, and 87 troops with 1,621 Scouts in New Hampshire. In 1925, the Manchester Council acquired Camp Manning in Gilmanton as a summer camp. While the Manchester Council grew rapidly, the rest of New Hampshire's Scouting program saw limited growth.

On May 25, 1929, the Manchester Council was renamed the Daniel Webster Council (#330) and expanded to cover Scouting for the entire state. The new name was derived from New Hampshire statesman Daniel Webster.

== Recent history (1950-present) ==
The Daniel Webster Council initially operated Camp Manning in Gilmanton and Camp Carpenter in Manchester. In 1945, Camp Carpenter became the official Scout camp for the Daniel Webster Council. In 1969, under the leadership of Max I. Silber, the council established the Lawrence L. Lee Scout Museum at Camp Carpenter to recognize the council's longtime Scout Executive. In 1971, the Daniel Webster Council acquired Hidden Valley Scout Reservation from the Norumbega Council in Massachusetts. Hidden Valley is near Gilmanton Iron Works, New Hampshire. In the late 1980s, Camp Carpenter became a Cub Scouts camp during the summer months. In the early 2000s, Hidden Valley was renamed the Griswold Scout Reservation. It was divided into two camps: Hidden Valley and the new Camp Bell.

Hidden Valley and Camp Carpenter are traditional Scout camps with full dining facilities and various program areas and activities. Camp Bell is run with a higher emphasis on strengthening the Patrol Method. Campers cook at their sites and participate in day-long activities as patrols. Camp Bell has a different variety of activities from Hidden Valley, including their "living history areas, " and a different set of merit badges are available.

Together, Hidden Valley and Camp Bell make up the Griswold Scout Reservation, which covers over 3,500 acres (14 km^{2}) including several lakes, ponds, and mountains. The land currently used primarily by Camp Bell has been used as the homes of many other camps, most recently Camp Manning, which, after being sold by the Daniel Webster Council to private owners, changed ownership several times and had previously existed as a camp run by various organization such as the YMCA who called it Camp Leo. Camp Bell was named for an attorney member of the Council's Executive Board who was instrumental in reacquiring the property for the Daniel Webster Council.

The Council also operates three additional facilities—Pierre Hoge in Walpole, Camp Whipporwill in Merrimack, and the Unity Program Center in Unity.

== Boy Scouts of America in New Hampshire ==
One Boy Scouts of America local council serves New Hampshire.

=== Spirit of Adventure Council ===
With the Boston Minuteman Council and Yankee Clipper Council merging to form the Spirit of Adventure Council, the units of Yankee Clipper Council in New Hampshire have been transferred into the Daniel Webster Council, effective April 1, 2015.

On January 1, 1993, the North Essex Council, the North Bay Council, and the Lone Tree Council were merged to form the Yankee Clipper Council. In December 1999, the Greater Lowell Council was merged into the Yankee Clipper Council. Today, the council has five districts, serving a large corner of northern Massachusetts and southern New Hampshire. With eight towns (Atkinson, East Kingston, Hampstead, Kingston, Newton, Plaistow, Seabrook and South Hampton) located in the Lone Tree District, Yankee Clipper Council is the smaller of the two councils in the Granite State. Until 2007, Yankee Clipper Council operated Camp Onway in Raymond, New Hampshire.

== Girl Scouting in New Hampshire ==
Girl Scouts of the Green and White Mountains
- Map of Girl Scout Councils in New Hampshire
- Owner: GSUSA
- Headquarters: Bedford, New Hampshire
- Location: New Hampshire and Vermont
- Country: United States
- Website www.girlscoutsgwm.org

In January 2009, the Girl Scouts of Swift Water Council, which served New Hampshire and 60 towns in southeastern Vermont, merged with the Girl Scout Council of Vermont.

Girl Scouts of the Green and White Mountains serves over 10,000 girls and adults in New Hampshire and Vermont. It is one of 112 councils chartered by Girl Scouts of the USA.

=== Service centers ===
- Bedford, New Hampshire - One Commerce Dr. Bedford, NH 03110 603.627.4158 or 888.474.9686
- Portsmouth, New Hampshire - Camp Seawood 603.436.1938 or 603.610.0285

=== Camps ===
New Hampshire

- Camp Kettleford - 30 acres (0.12 km^{2}) near Bedford
- Camp Seawood - 38 acres (0.15 km^{2}) near Portsmouth

Vermont

- Camp Farnsworth is over 300 acres (1.2 km^{2}) in Thetford, Vermont. It surrounds 50-acre (0.20 km^{2}) Lake Abenaki. It started as an all-girls camp in 1909 as, Camp Hanoum and became a Girl Scout camp in 1959. The 100th anniversary was celebrated in 2009.
- Twin Hills in Richmond

Financial aid (also known as campership) assists girls living in Green and White Mountains' jurisdiction who could not otherwise afford to attend a Green and White Mountains camp.

== Scouting museums in New Hampshire ==
In 1967, prominent Scouter Max I. Silber sought to display several articles he had acquired from his many Scout trips worldwide. Amongst other artifacts, Max had been given many personal effects of Scouting founder Robert Baden-Powell from his widow, Lady Olave Baden-Powell, including original drawings and writings from the founder. Max and his good friend Council Executive Lawrence L. "Larry" Lee discussed the idea of displaying the collection, and they decided to build a small museum at Camp Carpenter in Manchester. . Larry died before the museum was finished, and it was decided that it was only fitting to name the museum after him. The Lawrence L. Lee Scouting Museum opened its doors in 1969.

In 1978, the museum needed to expand, and it was decided also to build a library where the large collection of Scout books could be displayed and used to learn about Scouting's vast history. The Museum Committee elected to name the library after Max, who on top of his great dedication and service to Scouting around the world was the catalyst for the museum's founding.

The Lawrence L. Lee Scouting Museum and Max I. Silber Library are run by volunteer staff and a committee that keeps the museum open every Wednesday 10-4, Select Saturdays 10-3 and select days during Cub Scout Summer Camp in July and August. They never have had to charge for admission. (jb 12/24)

== Scouting events in New Hampshire ==
The Daniel Webster Council sponsors a statewide Scouts BSA Jamboree every four years, a three-day program that gathers up to 5,000 Scouts and guests from New Hampshire and the surrounding areas. The most recent New Hampshire Jamboree was named "NHXperience" and was held May 4-6, 2018, at the New Hampshire Motor Speedway in Loudon.
