= Scouting in Massachusetts =

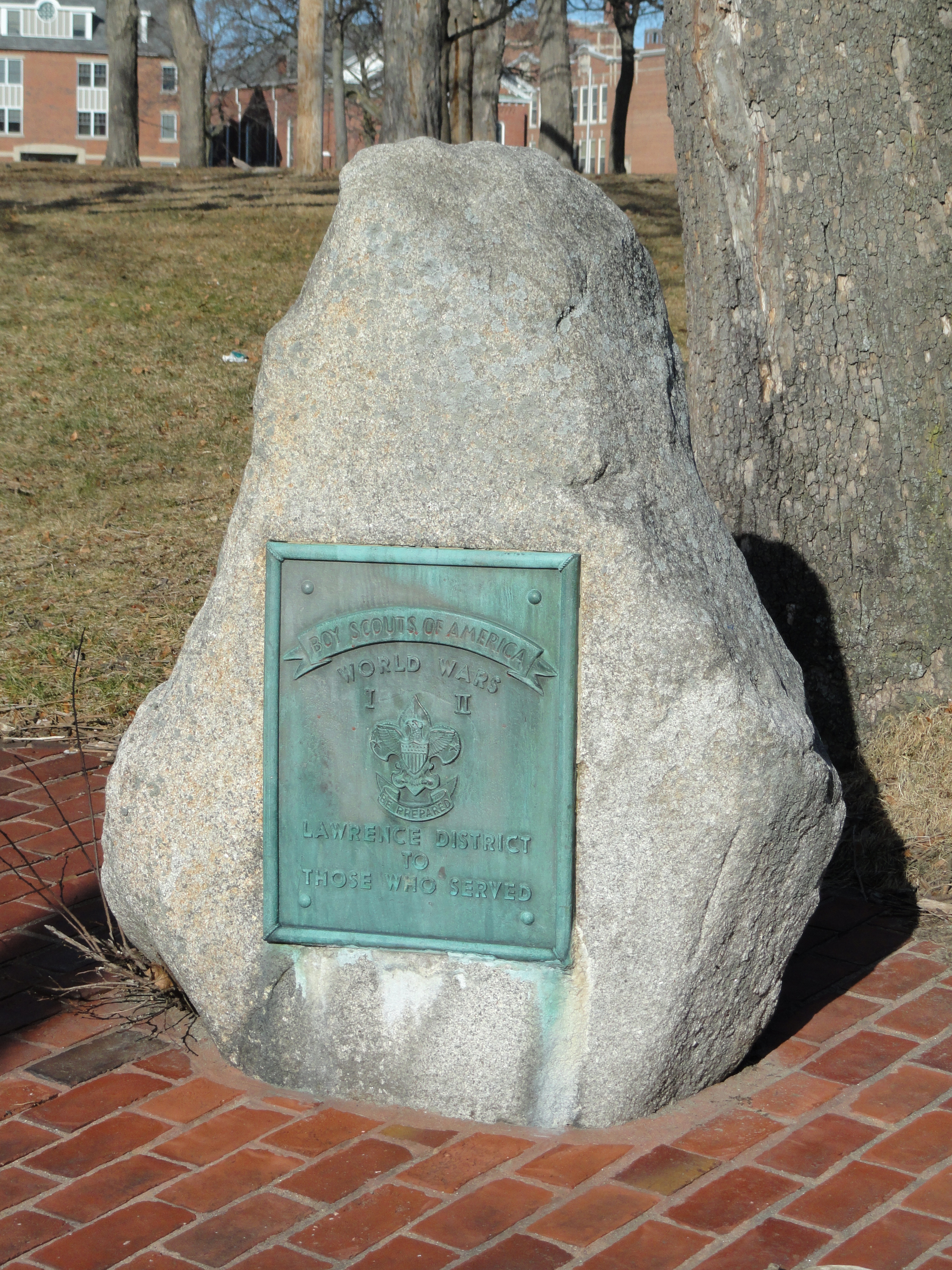
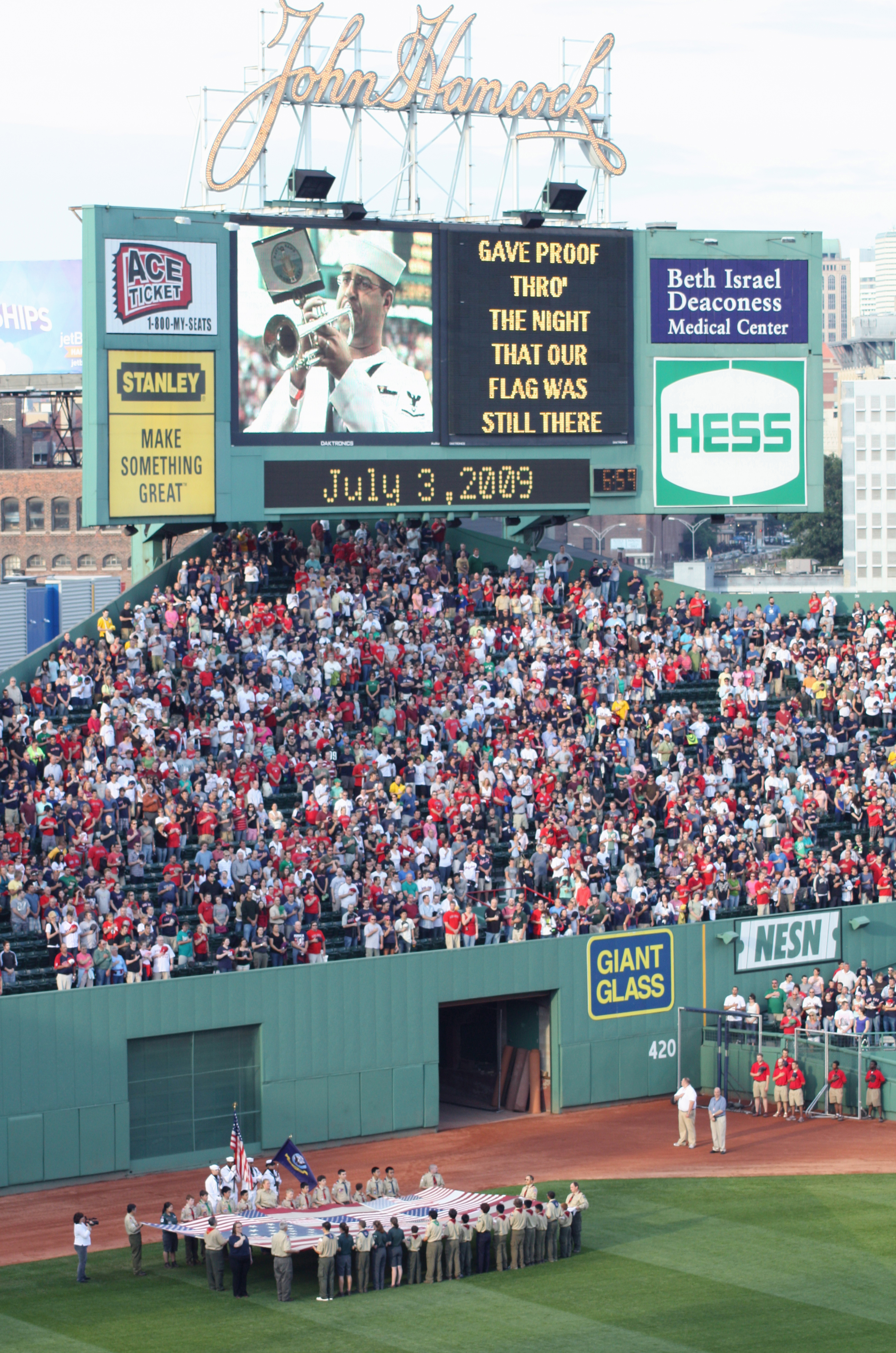
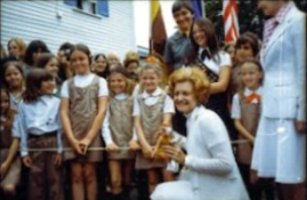
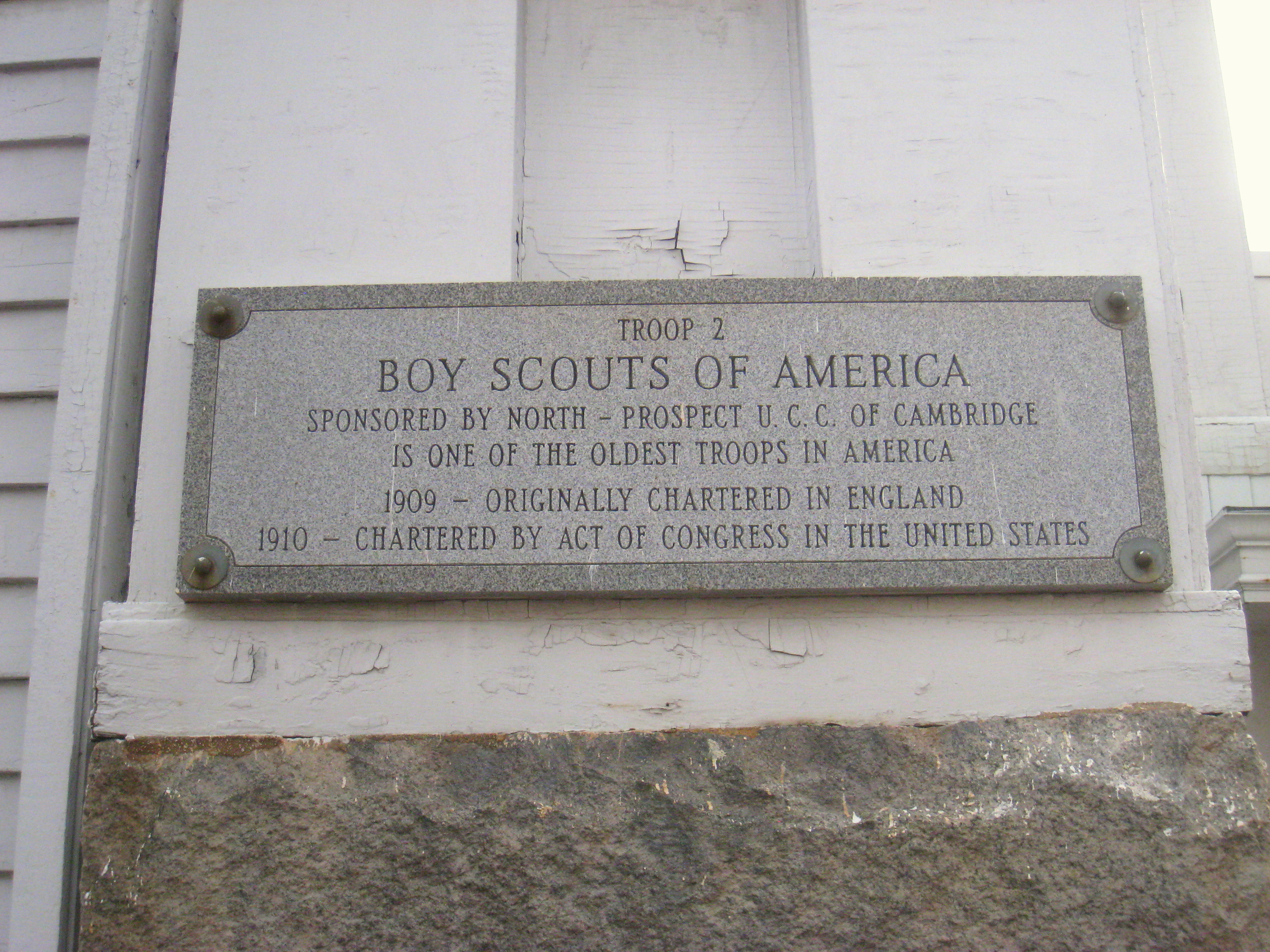
- Boy Scouts World Wars memorial Scouts at Fenway Park Betty Ford with Girl Scouts Cambridge plaque

Scouting in Massachusetts includes both Girl Scout (GSUSA) and Scouting America organizations. Boy Scouts of America was founded in the 1910s in Massachusetts. Girl Scouts USA was founded in 1912, by Juliette Gordon Low. With a vigorous history, both organizations actively serve thousands of youth in programs that suit the environment in which they live.

== History ==
By 1910, a scout like group, Boston City Guard, was founded by Frank O. Carpenter of the English High School. In June 1910, the American Boy Scouts started organizing the Department of New England which was operational in August or September under chief department scout General William H. Oakes and based in Boston. On February 1, 2019, Boy Scouts of America started allowing all-girl troops to be formed. A number of all-girl troops have been formed in Massachusetts.

== Scouting America in Massachusetts today ==
=== Cape Cod and the Islands Council ===
Cape Cod and the Islands Council
- Owner: Scouting America
- Headquarters: Yarmouthport, Massachusetts
- Country: United States
- Website www.scoutscapecod.org

The Cape Cod and the Islands Council serves Cape Cod, Martha's Vineyard, and Nantucket with their headquarters residing in Yarmouthport, Massachusetts. The Council owns Greenough Scout Reservation. The Order of the Arrow lodge is Abake Mi-Sa-Na-Ki Lodge #393.

=== Mayflower Council ===
Mayflower Council
- Owner: Scouting America
- Headquarters: Milford, Massachusetts
- Country: United States
- Founded: 2017
- President: Ian Johnson
- Council Commissioner: Josh Paulin
- Scout Executive: Bryan Feather
- Website mayflowerbsa.org

On March 28, 2017, Knox Trail Council and Old Colony Council voted to merge and create a new, combined council. The merger was executed on May 10, 2017; with the new council using the name 'Council 251' pending the selection of a new name. On August 30, 2017 members voted to become the Mayflower Council. Mayflower Council was headquartered at the former Knox Trail Council office in Marlborough, Massachusetts. On October 2, 2020, the council moved into its new service center at 83 Cedar Street in Milford. Massachusetts. Mayflower Council comprises five districts covering 62 communities: Post Road, Metacomet. Cranberry Harbors, Sachem, and Headwaters Districts.

Mayflower Council owns three camp properties: Camp Resolute, Bolton; Camp Squanto, Plymouth and Nobscot Scout Reservation, Sudbury/Framingham. Camps Resolute and Squanto are summer residential camps while Nobscot is a short-term camping facility.

The Order of the Arrow is represented by the new Tantamous Lodge #223; with the Owl as its totem.

=== Heart of New England Council ===
The Heart of New England Council was created in 2018 with the merger of the Mohegan Council and the Nashua Valley Council. Mohegan Council and Nashua Valley Councils voted to merge on May 31 and May 30, 2018, respectively. The Heart of New England Council consists of two districts and serves 62 communities in Central Massachusetts.

On October 20, 2018, the Order of the Arrow lodges from the former Councils merged, creating Catamount Lodge.

The Council operates Camp Wanocksett, founded in 1924 in Dublin, New Hampshire. Camp Wanocksett serves as a summer camp for both Scouts BSA and Venturing BSA during seven weeks of program. Camp Wanocksett is over 230 acres of land that borders Mount Monadnock, one of the most frequently climbed mountains in the world.

Heart of New England Council
- Owner: Scouting America
- Headquarters: Rutland, Massachusetts
- Country: United States
- Founded: 2018
- President: Chris Baker
- Council Commissioner: Brian Anders
- Scout Executive: Mark Barbernitz
- Website heartofnewenglandbsa.org

The Council operates Treasure Valley Scout Reservation, founded in 1926 in Rutland, Massachusetts. Treasure Valley Scout Reservation serves as a summer camp for both Scouts BSA and Cub Scouts. Treasure Valley Scout Reservation consists of over 1600 acres of land expanding over the towns of Rutland, Spencer, Paxton, and Oakham, Massachusetts.

The Council also operates Camp Split Rock, founded in 1945 in Ashburnham, Massachusetts. Camp Split Rock has previously served as a Scouts BSA and Cub Scout camp since its founding. The camp now operates as a weekend retreat location with campsites and cabins available for rent by units.

=== Narragansett Council ===
Narragansett Council
- Owner: Scouting America
- Headquarters: Cranston, Rhode Island
- Country: United States
- Website www.narragansettbsa.org

Narragansett Council is based in East Providence, Rhode Island and serves part of Massachusetts, as well as all of Rhode Island and part of Connecticut. The council gained a significant foothold in Massachusetts through merger with the former Moby Dick Council in 2001, and increased its area through merger with the former Annawon Council in 2016. Council camps in Massachusetts include Camp Norse (Kingston) and Camp Buxton (Rehoboth). The council also operates Camp Champlin (Cranston) and Yawgoog Scout Reservation in Rhode Island. The Order of the Arrow Lodge is Tulpe Lodge #102.

=== Spirit of Adventure Council ===
Spirit of Adventure Council
- Owner: Scouting America
- Headquarters: Milton, MA
- Country: United States
- Founded: 2015
- President: Dave Clayman
- Council Commissioner: Jason Maffetore
- Interim Scout Executive: Jonathan Pleva
- Website www.scoutspirit.org

The Spirit of Adventure Council was formed from a merger of the Yankee Clipper Council and Boston Minuteman Council on July 1, 2015. As part of this merger, New Hampshire towns of the former Yankee Clipper Council were transferred to Daniel Webster Council headquartered in Manchester, NH.

=== Western Massachusetts Council ===
Western Massachusetts Council (#234)
- Owner: Scouting America
- Headquarters: Holyoke, MA
- Country: United States
- Founded: 2008
- President: L. Scott Rice
- Council Commissioner: Richard Belford
- Scout Executive: Craig Sims
- Website www.wmascouting.org

The Western Massachusetts Council was created on June 28, 2008 with the merger of Great Trails Council and Pioneer Valley Council. Geographically, it is the largest BSA council in Massachusetts serving Berkshire, Franklin, Hampden, and Hampshire counties and the town of Stamford, Vermont. The council operates a Scout office-service center in Westfield and year-round camping facilities at Horace A. Moses Scout Reservation in Russell. It formerly operated Chesterfield Scout Reservation in Chesterfield, Massachusetts.

Organization

The Western Massachusetts Council is divided into three districts:

- Appalachian Trail District
- Metacomet District
- General Knox District

Order of the Arrow

The Pocumtuc Lodge of the Western Massachusetts Council was formed by the merger of Memsochet Lodge 507 (Great Trails Council) and Allogagan Lodge 83 (Pioneer Valley Council) on September 28, 2008. Pocumtuc Lodge serves the BSA summer camp at Horace A. Moses Scout Reservation, with OA days occurring on Wednesdays during summer weeks. During OA days, Brotherhood conversations are done and there is lodge fellowship.

== George W. Magee Memorial Trust Fund ==
The George W. Magee Memorial Trust Fund is a Massachusetts-based trust whose proceeds are used to support the purchase and improvement of the camps operated by BSA Councils in Massachusetts.

=== History ===
George W. P. Magee was a theatrical agent and manager who most notably managed Boston's Grand Opera House from the 1890s through 1916. Being very involved in the community, he saw Scouting as a program making significant positive impact on the lives of young men. He turned this belief into a permanent commitment to Scouting, by establishing a trust upon his death.

George Magee died in 1939, with France Cornell and Frederick W. Cook becoming the original Trustees of the fund. It took nearly 5 years, until 1944, for the fund to reach the minimum level for income to be distributed ($500,000). In 1944, the fund distributed $11,000. Upon the death of Mr. Cornell in 1961, the Old Colony Trust Company became the sole corporate trustee of the fund.

=== Today ===
As of 2004, the fund had a market value of approximately $7.3 million, with an annual distribution of $210,000. Over its lifetime, the fund has contributed over $6.2 million to hundreds of projects, impacting over a million youth, at various scout camps. Funds are held by the Private Bank at Bank of America, the current successor of the Old Colony Trust Company, and they are advised by a committee composed of local Scouting professionals and volunteers. Many Massachusetts camps conduct a "Magee Night" competition or other similar event to celebrate Mr. Magee's contribution, and it is quite easy to find buildings named after Mr. Magee or with plaques bearing his name.

Councils requesting money typically make proposals to the advisory committee, stating the purpose of the project, the amount being requested, and any moneys being provided through other sources. Only Councils located in Massachusetts are eligible, although as the will reads the camps that benefit may be located elsewhere in New England.

== Girl Scout Councils in Massachusetts ==
Map of Girl Scout councils in Massachusetts

There are three Girl Scout councils serving Massachusetts, one of which is headquartered in Rhode Island.

=== Girl Scouts of Central and Western Massachusetts ===
Girl Scouts of Central and Western Massachusetts serves 15,000 girls in 186 communities. It was formed by a merger in early 2008 of three councils: Girl Scouts of Montachusett Council, Girl Scouts of Pioneer Valley, Girl Scouts of Western Massachusetts.

Headquarters: Holyoke, Massachusetts and Worcester, Massachusetts
website: www.gscwm.org

Camps

- Bonnie Brae, East Otis, Massachusetts
- Green Eyrie, Harvard, Massachusetts
- Laurel Wood, Spencer, Massachusetts
- Lewis Perkins, South Hadley, Massachusetts

=== Girl Scouts of Eastern Massachusetts ===
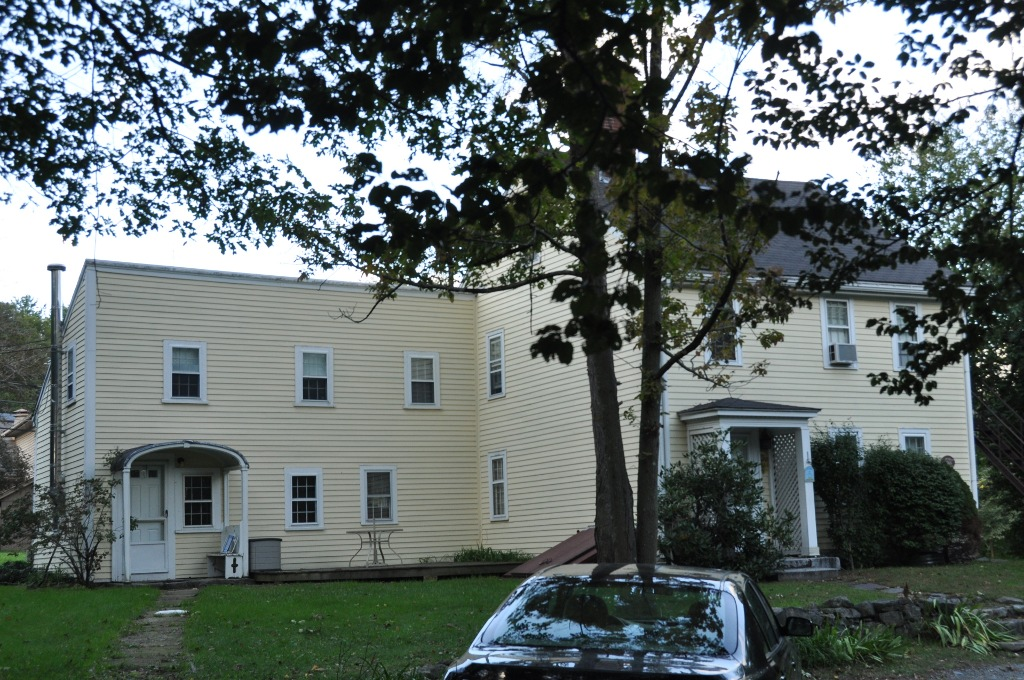
The historic Ephraim Hammond House in Waltham. The estate is now owned by the Girl Scouts of Eastern Massachusetts.

Girl Scouts of Eastern Massachusetts serves more than 19,000 girls and 11,000 adults in 177 Massachusetts communities and South Hampton, New Hampshire. It was formed February 1, 2008 by a merger of three councils: Girl Scouts, Patriots' Trail; Girl Scout Council of Southeastern Massachusetts; Girl Scouts of Spar and Spindle Council.

Headquarters: Waltham, Massachusetts
website: www.gsema.org

==== Service Centers ====
- Andover, Massachusetts
- Middleboro, Massachusetts
- Waltham, Massachusetts

==== Camps ====
- Camp Maude Eaton, Andover, Massachusetts
- Camp Favorite, Brewster, Massachusetts Available activities include sailing and accommodations are usually platform tents.
- Camp Rice Moody, Reading, Massachusetts
- Camp Runels, Pelham, New Hampshire
- Camp Wind-in-the-Pines, Plymouth, Massachusetts
- Camp Cedar Hill, Waltham, Massachusetts
- Friendship House, Gloucester, Massachusetts
- Wampanoag Girl Scout Center (Chilmark), Martha's Vineyard, Massachusetts
- Cedar Hill Program Center, Waltham, Massachusetts

==== Former Girl Scout Camps ====
- Camp Edith Reed, Norton, Massachusetts
- Greenbrier Girl Scout Center, Acushnet, Massachusetts
- Camp Virginia, Bolton, Massachusetts
- Camp Winnetaska, Ashland, Massachusetts
- Marion White, Richmond, Massachusetts
- Neyati, Leicester, Massachusetts
- Kinnebrook, Worthington, Massachusetts
- Camp Malcolm, Needham, Massachusetts
- Camp Wabasso, Bradford, New Hampshire
- Camp Menotomy, Meredith, New Hampshire

=== Girl Scouts of Southeastern New England ===
This council supports Massachusetts girls in Bellingham, Blackstone, Attleboro, Fall River, North Attleboro, Plainville, Somerset, Swansea, Westport, Wrentham, Millville, Rehoboth and Seekonk.

=== Former Girl Scout Camps ===
- Camp Muriel Flagg is a locale in Williamstown, Massachusetts named for Muriel Flagg, a Girl Scout leader and teacher. Originally a Girl Scout camp, it opened in June 1964 and probably ceased operations in the late 1970s or early 1980s. It is located at an elevation of 1,004 feet (306.0 m) and is 1.5 miles (2.4 km) north of Williamstown in Berkshire County Latitude 42°44′28″N 073°11′08″W

== Scouting museums ==
- Girl Scout Museum at Cedar Hill, Waltham, Massachusetts
- Norman Rockwell Museum, Stockbridge, Massachusetts
- Girl Scout Museum, Leeds Service Center, Leeds, Massachusetts
- Casoni Scout Museum, Camp Sqaunto, Plymouth, Massachusetts
- Lee Lawrence Scouting Museum, Camp Carpenter, Manchester, New Hampshire
- Leominster Scouting Museum, Leominster, Massachusetts
- Camp Norse Scouting Museum, Kingston, Massachusetts

== See also ==
- Essex, Massachusetts
- Shingebiss
