= Iran Scout Organization =

Youth organization in Iran

Iran Scout Organization سازمان پیشاهنگی ایران
- Badge of the Iranian Scout Organization in the 70s
- Country: Iran
- Founded: 1925
- Website pishahang.org

Iran Scout Organization (Persian: سازمان پیشاهنگی ایران, Sazman-e Pishahengi-ye Iran) was founded in 1925 under the rule of Reza Shah Pahlavi. Currently Iran is one of 29 countries where Scouting exists (be it embryonic or widespread) but where there is no National Scout Organization which is a member of the World Organization of the Scout Movement at the present time.

== History ==
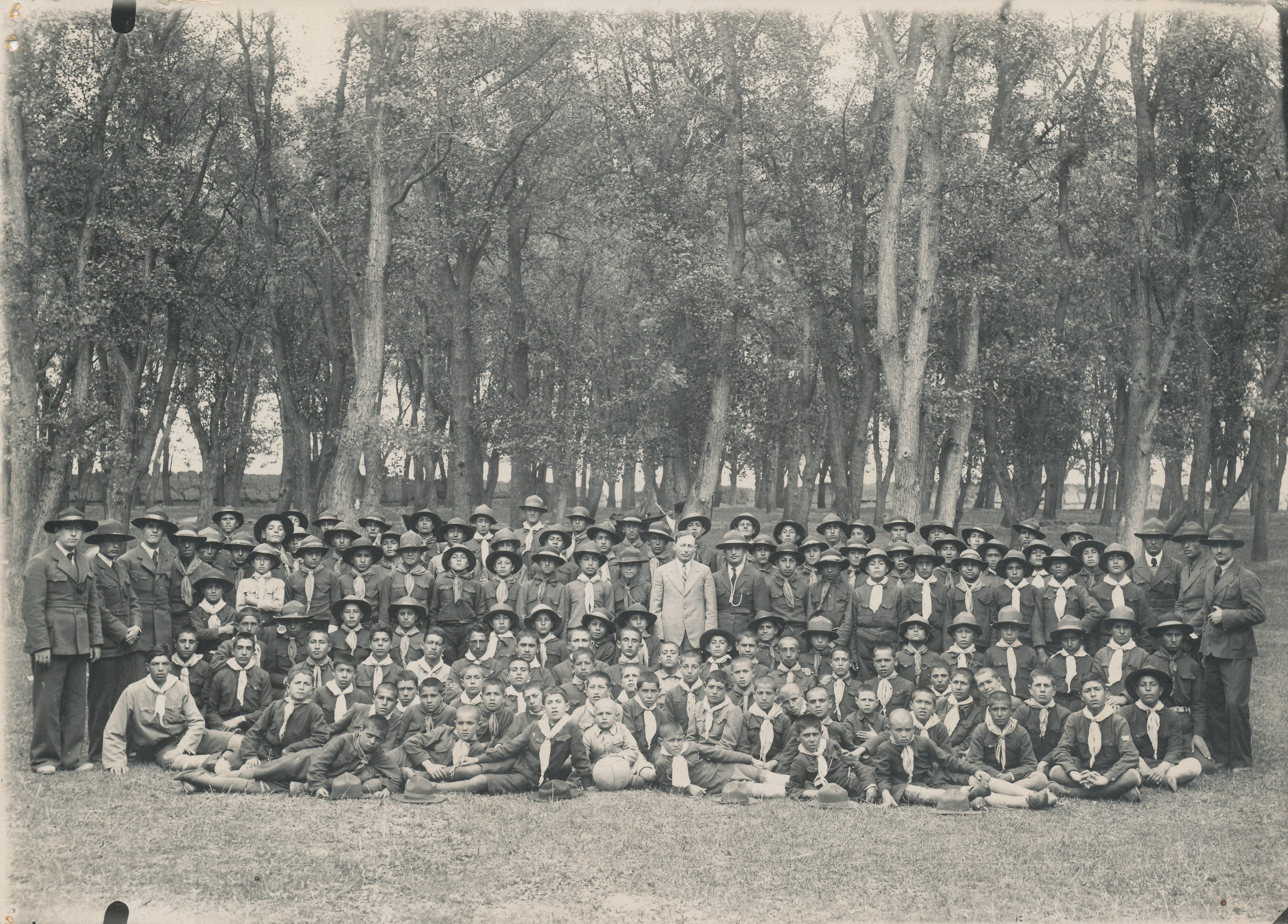
A group of scouts from Hedayat School in Ardabil in 1314 (1935–1936)

Scouting in Iran was founded by volunteers and established by Sir Mirza Ahmad Aminzadeh in 1925, and formally developed in 1928 as a department of the Ministry of Education, which at the time engendered a lack of public support. It was first recognized as a member of the World Organization of the Scout Movement that year. Despite obstacles, Aminzadeh continued his work, followed by Seyed Reza Akhavi.

The first 15-day leadership classes were held at Camp Manzariyeh at Bahonar in May 1935. Forty leaders from Tehran and forty-four from other cities participated. During that summer, Scouting laws and Promises were formulated.

Gradually, Scouting expanded across the country, but was suddenly suppressed when in August 1941 Britain and the USSR invaded Iran, arrested Reza Shah and sent him into exile during World War II. In 1943, the government again became interested in Scouting movement. The Ministry of Culture was put in direct control of Scouting, working with new plans and focus. in October, 1943, an American expert, Mr. Gibson, was invited to Iran to manage Scouting and the Physical Education Organization. However, during the next eleven years, only one or two small groups were functioning. Later notables of Iranian Scouting Ebrahim Sadri, Jalil Ketabi and others were active in this difficult period, and their interest and effort would assist in Scouting's full rebirth on December 3, 1952.

In 1953 Dr. Hossein Banai, recently returned from university in the United States with degrees in Psychology and Physical Education, became the commissioner of the Iran Scout Organization (سازمان پیش آهنگی ایران). Dr. Banai started the new movement with great enthusiasm and held the first course of Scout leader training for the revived organization. The Iran Scout Organization movement faced many social problems and obstacles, but with the efforts of Dr. Banai, the Iran Scout Organization achieved several successes.

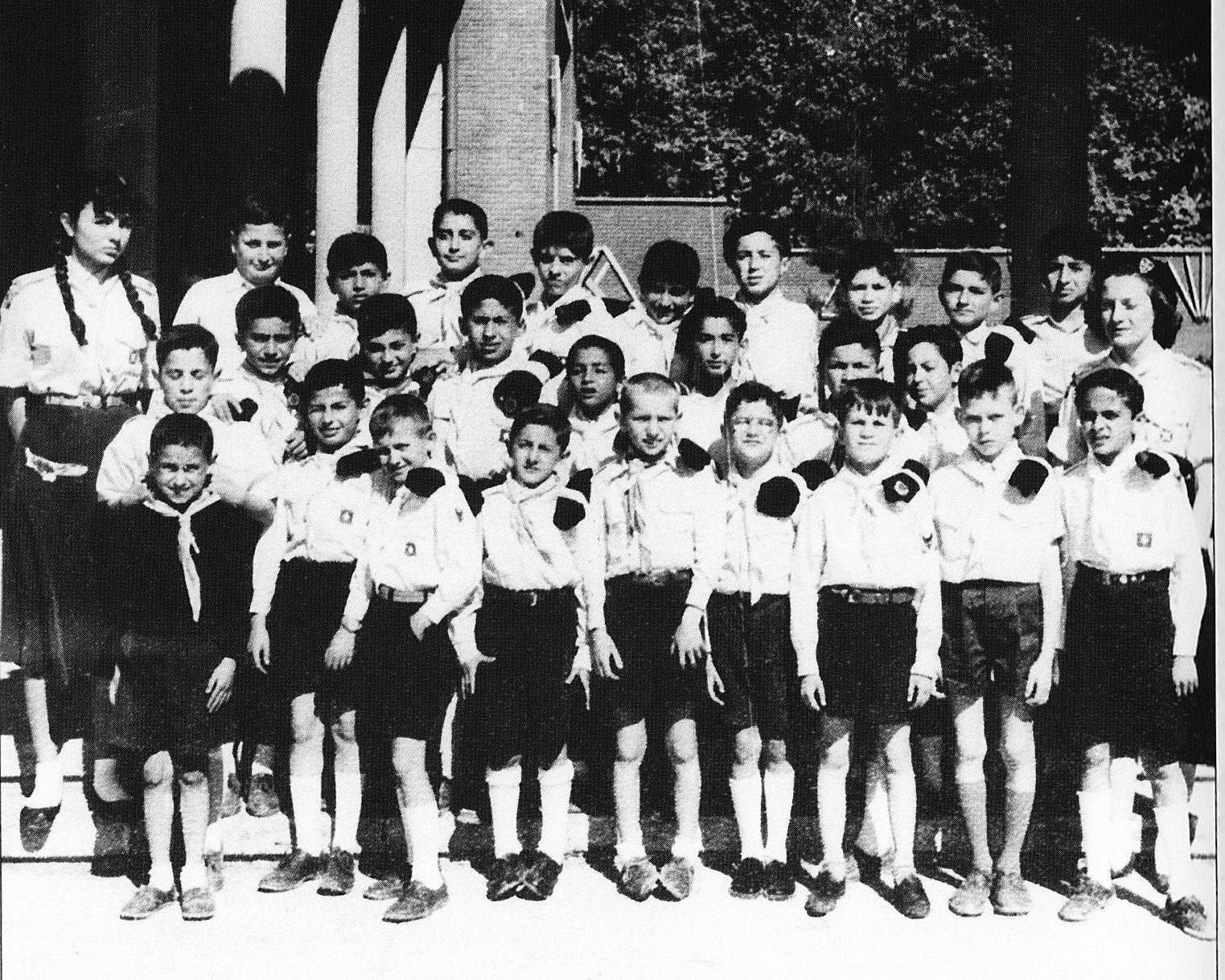
Farah Pahlavi (on the left) with Iranian Boy Scouts in Paris, (c. 1956)

Iran became a member of the World Bureau of the World Organization of the Scout Movement for the second time in 1955. The first National Jamboree of Iran was held in 1956 and was recognized with 2 postage stamps issued on August 5, 1956. In the late 1950s, more than 15,000 boys joined Scouting in Iran. The Majlis of Iran passed an act in 1958 recognizing Iranian Scouting as an independent national association. 1958 was a busy year for Iranian Scouting as the next national jamboree was held, with 4,000 Scouts participating, as well as Scouts from Pakistan, Turkey, Iraq, Jordan, England, Japan, Germany and Americans living in Iran. Scouts also established a small poultry farm for fundraising at the national Scout campsite at Manzariyeh, at the foot of the Alborz Mountains outside Teheran, as well as fields and greenhouses for flower-raising. At the meeting of the International Committee in Athens in August 1958, Manzariyeh (meaning "pleasant prospect") was chosen as the site of an international Scout training center, similar to Kandersteg in Switzerland, and deputy camp chiefs from around the world were invited to staff and run the training courses. During the 1950s, the focus was on introducing Scouting in rural, agrarian districts, and by 1961, Iran had a total membership of 21,829 Scouts.

The third National Jamboree was held in 1960 and was also recognized with 2 postage stamps issued on July 18, 1960.

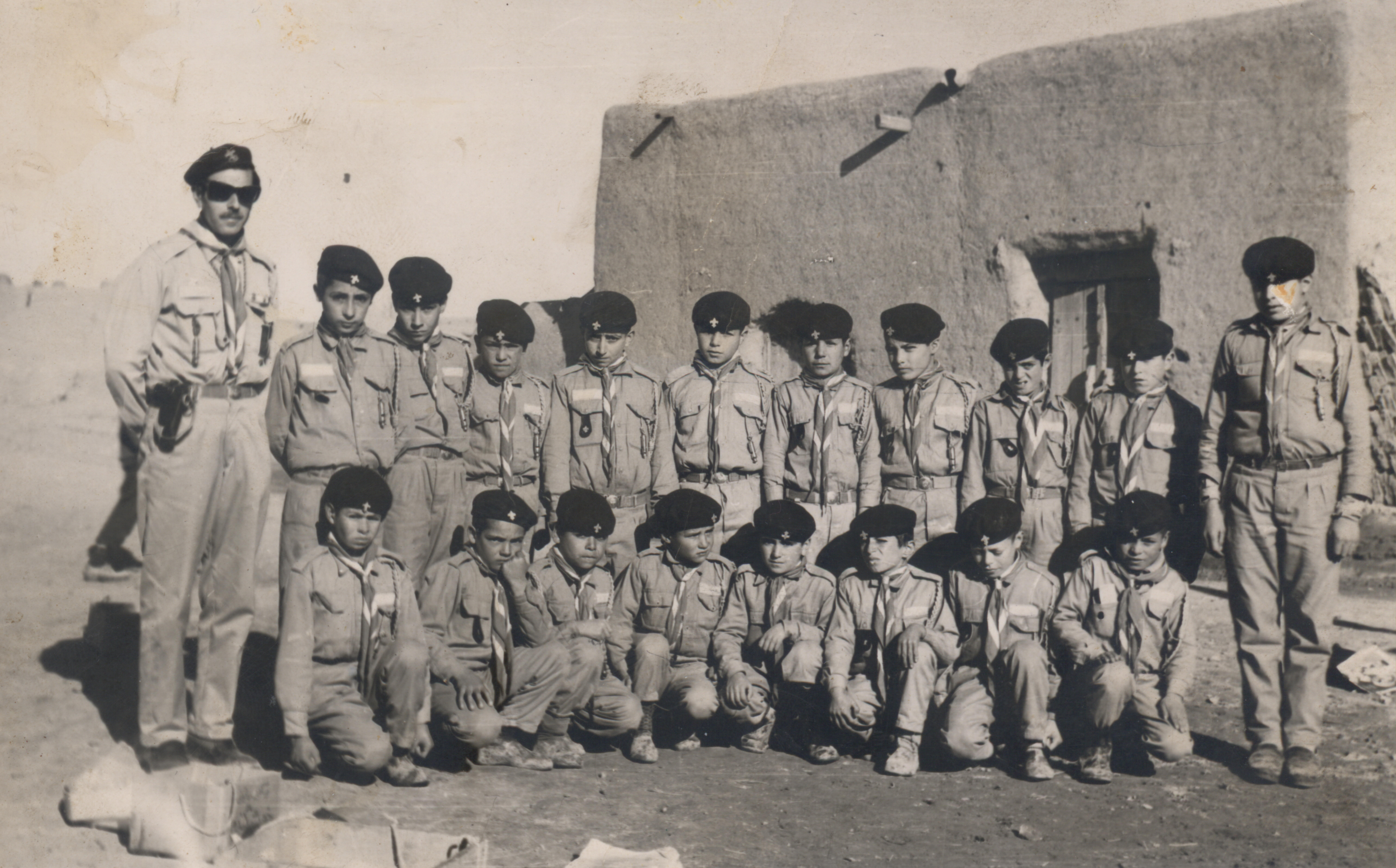
Iranian Scouts in Lalejin, Hamadan Province in the early 1960s

In 1962, the first Scout Congress was held at Camp Bahonar, Manzarieh, and representatives of all cities participated.

In 1963, in addition to the annual Scout High Council, the second Nationwide Scout Congress was held in Tehran, and all cultural executive directors from all cities participated.

Iranian Scouting uniform in the 1960s

In 1965 the Middle East Rover Moot was held in Iran and recognized with a postage stamp issued July 23, 1965.

In 1965, Dr. Banai was awarded the Bronze Wolf, the only distinction given by the World Organization of the Scout Movement, for exceptional services to world Scouting.

In 1966, Manzariyeh was recognized as an international Scout training center; Dr. Banai became one of 12 members of the World Scout Committee; and Mr. Ali Hashemi established the Scout Supporting Association.

The fifteenth anniversary of the rebirth of Iranian Scouting was recognized by "Cooperation Week" and a postage stamp issued on December 3, 1967. the twentieth anniversary was also recognized with a postage stamp on December 9, 1972.

A new national headquarters was completed in 1973. In the 1970s, Iranian Scouts assisted the Red Lion and Sun Society in blood drives and first aid work, hosted the Asia-Pacific Regional Conference in 1976, (recognized with a postage stamp on October 2, 1976) and collected books for literacy drives. Scout houses, which were used as meeting places, training centers, hostels, and local headquarters, could be found in every major city during the period, and in 1975 there were 262,702 Scouts. In 1977 Iran hosted the Second Asia-Pacific Jamboree and this was recognized with a postage stamp issued on August 5, 1977.

At that time, the Iranian Scout organization was one of the strongest Scout's organizations in the world. Iran served as a model for other Scout associations in desert areas, with its publication of "The Stone Badge" by Ebrahim Sadri, which described Scoutcraft for Scouts living in areas where there is little wood. The Iranian Scouting uniform of that period consisted of a khaki shirt and trousers: short for summer, long for winter. The vision of the Iran Scout Organization at that time brought hope, as this organization brought honor to Iran. There was a single, unified, interfaith and joint (but not coeducational) Scouting and Guiding movement in Iran. The Guide organization hosted the 23rd World Conference of the World Association of Girl Guides and Girl Scouts (WAGGGS), and this was recognized with a postage stamp issued on September 2, 1978. These organizations grew for many years and included 20 Scouting campsites in different provinces, until the overthrow of Mohammad Reza Shah Pahlavi in 1979.

Until the Islamic Revolution, there were American Boy Scout troops in Tehran and Isfahan, serving in the Damavand District of the Direct Service branch of the Boy Scouts of America, which supports units around the world.

== 15th World Jamboree ==
The 15th World Jamboree was scheduled to be held in Nishapur, Iran, in July 1979, at the 10 square kilometre Omar Khayyám Scout Park, near the Afghan and Turkmen borders. The Second Asia-Pacific Jamboree was held at the site in preparation, in the summer of 1977. However, the destabilizing events of the Islamic Revolution resulted in the cancellation of the 15th World Jamboree near the end of 1978. Instead, the World Organization announced the "World Jamboree Year" by holding several international World Jamboree Year camps in Australia, Canada, Sweden, Switzerland and the United States.

== Difficulties and rebirth ==
Since the 1970s, Iranian Scouting has faced difficulties, and lost WOSM membership. The government placed restraints on Scouting during the 1980s, and the wars in which Iran became involved drew away many Scout-age boys and adult leaders for military service.

On March 15, 1979, two weeks before establishment of the Islamic Republic of Iran, two thousands of Scouts and leaders were gathered in Feizieh School in Qom, to meet the supreme leader Ayatollah Khomeini, where he stated that "You Dear ones, must keep up your enthusiasm. You must Guard your movement."

However, his explicit and clear command was disregarded, when in 1987, the Majlis canceled the Iran Scout Organization with one or two opposing votes.

The 35th World Scout Conference, convened in Durban, South Africa from July 26 to 30, 1999, voted to remove Iran from membership because the national Scout organization had ceased to exist.

Finally, Mohsen Zanjani, a former Scout who was interested in renewing Scouting and was present for Khomeini's speech, decided to rebuild the organization in Iran. He is now the director of Scouting in Iran. Born in Tehran in 1925, Zanjani lived his childhood and adolescence with the older Scouters, from whom he learned much Scoutcraft. Because of his drive, he served as patrol leader and Scoutmaster, and became a teacher and director of Air Scouting prior to the Revolution.

In 2003, the Iranian Scouting Organization was re-launched with endeavors in the fields of youth development, social skills, and training young people physically, mentally, socially, and spiritually. All of these activities are non-governmental, and Zanjani has responsibility for all activities. The Iran Scout Organization Constitution states that "all of the activities of the Iranian Scouting Organization are voluntary, educational, non-political and non-profitable... all about young people with no discrimination regarding about their race or beliefs. The members should follow the goals and the methods of the director of the Iranian Scouting Organization, and also the laws of the Islamic Republic of Iran."

The current Iranian Scouting uniform likely has longer shirt sleeves and full-length trousers, in accordance with Islamic edicts.

== Ideals and program ==
The Cub Scout Motto is Koushesh Kon!, translating as "Try Hard!" in Persian (equivalent to 'Do Your Best'). Cub Scouts were known as Shirbach'cheh, literally "Lion's Cubs" in Persian, but carrying the meaning brave children.

The Scout Motto is Aamaadeh Baash, (آماده باش) translating as "Be Prepared" in Persian. The Persian noun for Scouts is Pishahangi Pesharan, and Senior Scouts are known as Salaran.

The Outdoors Code is "As an Iranian, I will do my best to be clean in my outdoor manners, be careful with fire, be considerate in the outdoors, and be conservation-minded."

== Emblems ==
The ISO emblem, unlike most others in the world, changes every decade to reflect the political and social climate in the country at the moment. The emblems used over time reflect a shift from a monarchist government to an Islamic one.

1970s membership badge, featuring the Lion and Sun and the farvahar

1980s membership badge, includes takbir Allahu Akbar

2000s membership badge, reduced the Islamic imagery and adds the 12 points of the Scout Law

== See also ==
- Dokhtarān-e Pīshāhang-e Īrān
