= 15th World Scout Jamboree =

1983 scouting festival

The Spirit Lives On
- 15th World Scout Jamboree
- Location: Kananaskis, Alberta
- Country: Canada
- Date: 1983
- Attendance: 15,000 Scouts
Previous; 14th World Scout Jamboree	Next; 16th World Scout Jamboree

The 15th World Scout Jamboree was held July 5-15, 1983 and was hosted by Canada at Kananaskis, Alberta, an area of Provincial Park at about 4,000 feet elevation, in the foothills of the Rocky Mountains, 80 miles west of Calgary, Alberta. The Spirit Lives On was the theme of the jamboree, with a total attendance of over 15,000 Scouts from over 100 countries.

The name of the Jamboree refers to the idea that Scouting, and its spirit of international brotherhood, could overcome difficulties such as those which caused the cancellation of the 1979 Jamboree four years earlier.

The subcamps were named after Canadian animals.

A camp newspaper, "The Kananaskis Journal" was produced.

Open fires were prohibited.

== See also ==
- World Scout Jamboree
- Scouting in Alberta
