= Scouting in Vermont =

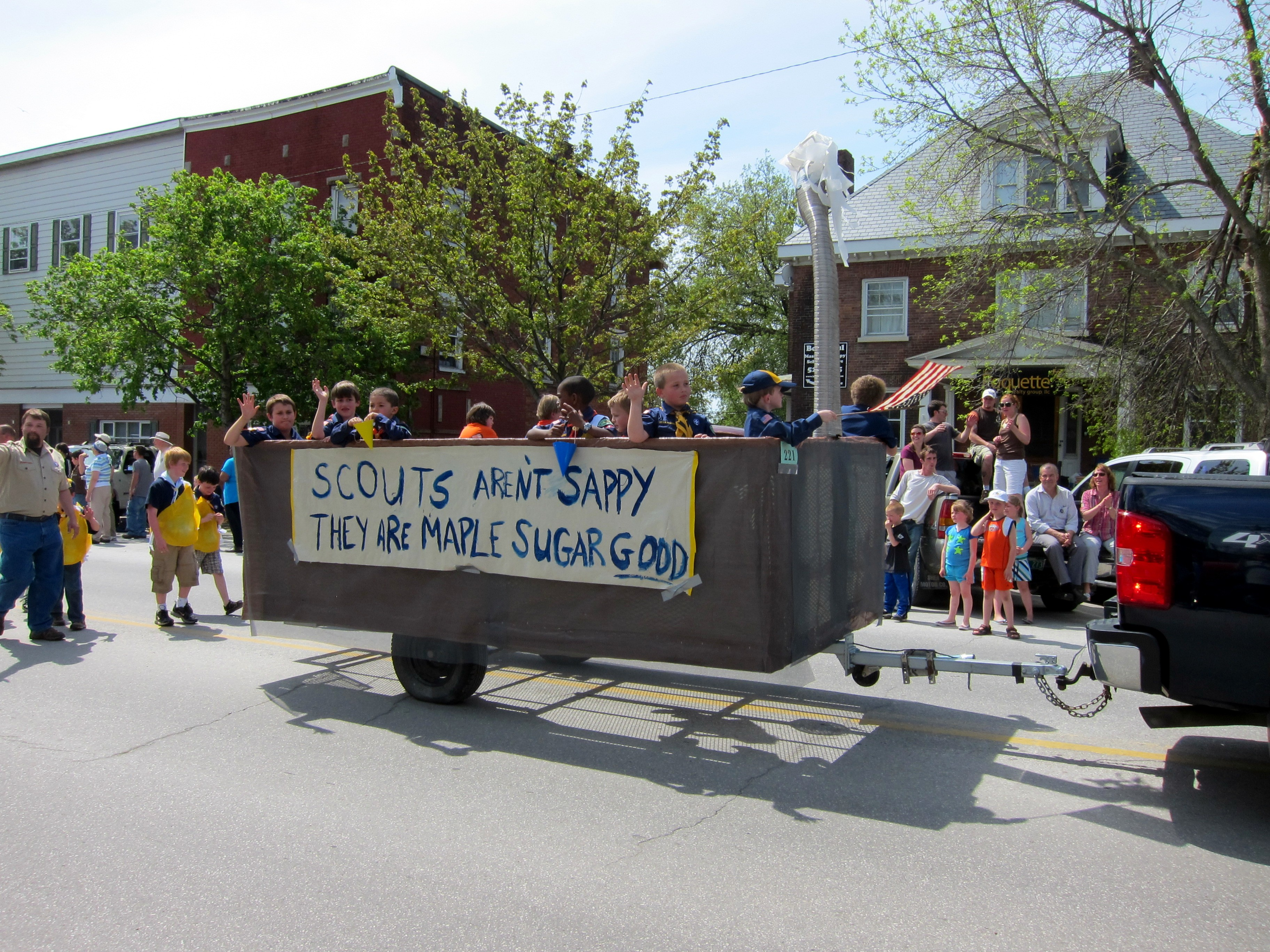
- Cub Scouts in St Albans

Scouting in Vermont has a long history, from the 1907 to the present day, serving thousands of youth in programs that suit the environment in which they live.

== Early history (1907–1950) ==
=== Boy Scouts of America ===
In 1910, the Burlington Council (#592) was formed, changing its name to the Champlain Council (#592) in 1926. The council closed in 1926.

In 1916, the Brattleboro Council was formed, closing in 1921.

In 1920, the Rutland Council was formed. The Rutland County Council (#593) became the Green Mountain Council (#593) in 1929. It became the Ethan Allen Council (#593) in 1965. It became the Green Mountain Council (#592) in 1972.

In 1926, the Owl Council (#762) was formed. It merged with the Green Mountain Council (#593) in 1930.

In 1926, the Windham-Windsor Council (#747) was formed. It changed its name to the Calvin Coolidge Council (#747) in 1936. It merged with the Ethan Allen Council (#593) in 1965.

In 1933, the Long Trail Council (#592) was formed. It merged with the Green Mountain Council (#592) in 1972.

=== 1910 Camp Iliam, Pownal ===
On September 10, 1910, S. F. Lester of Troy, New York, became the first person to hold the Scouting leadership position of Scoutmaster (approved by the BSA). He received his certification from the BSA headquarters in New York City. In 1910 he led a group of 30 scouts at Camp Ilium, in Pownal, Vermont. Camp Ilium was the starting point of the Boy Scout Movement for Troy, and Pownal. Pownal is only 35 miles (56 km) away from Troy.

=== Junior Boy Scouts ===
Junior Scouts existed in the British Boy Scouts (BBS) in 1909 and in Barre, Vermont for boys under age 11. This junior scout concept was later mirrored in Baden Powell's organization as Wolf Cubs or Cubs in 1916. The BSA started Cub Scouting in 1930. There is a complete Vermont Junior Scout uniform which dates to this 1909-1910 period. It is all hand stitched with a hand embroidered patch which reads "Junior Scout". It is probably the oldest American Boy Scout uniform that exists.

=== Camp Fire Girls of America ===
Founded on March 17, 1910, in Thetford, Vermont, by Dr. Luther Gulick and his wife Charlotte Vedder Gulick. Camp Fire Girls, as it was known at the time, was created as the sister organization to the Boy Scouts of America. The First Baptist Church of Barre also had a very early Camp Fire Girls organization around the same time the Thetford organization started.

=== Girl Scouts of the USA ===
The first known troop in Vermont was in Wilder in 1918.

The 50th anniversary of Girl Scouting was celebrated at a Senior Girl Scout Roundup held at Button Bay in Vergennes, Vermont in 1962. The U.S. Postal Service set up a temporary post office with a special postal stamp and cancellation for the occasion. Thousands of Girl Scouts came to the international Roundup. A reunion was held for the centennial of Girl Scouting in September 2012 in Vergennes. The Girl Scout council that now encompasses all of Vermont and all of New Hampshire was established in 2009 and is called Girl Scouts of the Green and White Mountains.

=== Norman Rockwell ===
Norman Rockwell moved here and created his most important artwork in Arlington from 1939 through 1953.

== Recent history (1950–2010) ==
International Girl Scout gatherings named Senior Roundups were held every three years from 1956 until 1965. The third one was held at Button Bay, Vermont from July 27 to August 3, 1962, with 9,000 girls in attendance.

On May 16, 2000, Gordon Lew, the scouting program director announced that the Long Trail Indian Camp was cancelled for the entire 2000 season due to concerns raised by Charles Yow, an attorney representing the American Indian Movement in New England. Yow expressed concerns about many activities at the camp, though his primary concern was the use of a sweat lodge by children - not only because of the spiritual significance of the lodge, there were concerns of the potential dangers the children would be exposed to from the intense heat. While Jerry Lupien, the executive director of the Green Mountain Council, claimed that Native Americans assisted in authenticating the camp's activities, Hal Grosser, the camp's program founder, would not name a single Native person that had consulted with the camp that summer. Additionally, Chief April St. Francis of the Vermont Abenaki stated that her band had never been contacted by camp employees for consultation.

In January 2009 Girl Scouts of Swift Water Council which served New Hampshire and also southeastern Vermont for 50 years merged with the 48-year-old Girl Scout Council of Vermont.

== Current Scouting America in Vermont ==
Green Mountain Council

Green Mountain Council
- Owner: Boy Scouts of America
- Headquarters: Waterbury, Vermont
- Country: United States
- President: Ken Libby
- Council Commissioner: Dave McAllister
- Scout Executive: Mark Saxon
- Website scoutingvermont.org

In the Boy Scouts of America, all of the state of Vermont is located in the Green Mountain Council. The Green Mountain Council is divided into four districts based upon geographical area. These four districts provide the program for the thousands of Scouts and Units served throughout the Council.

=== Organization ===
The council is divided into the following districts:

- Ethan Allen District
- Calvin Coolidge District
- Long Trail District
- Three Rivers District

In 2007 there were five districts in the Green Mountain Council. The Three Rivers District has replaced the Land of Champs and the Maple Leaf Districts.

=== Camps ===
Its Scout Camp is the Mount Norris Scout Reservation in Eden, Vermont and Cub Scout Camp is Camp Sunrise in Benson, Vermont.

=== Order of the Arrow ===
- Order of the Arrow – Ajapeu Lodge #351

== Girl Scouting in Vermont ==
Girl Scouting in Vermont
- Map of Girl Scout Councils in Vermont

In January 2009 Girl Scouts of Swift Water Council which served New Hampshire and 60 towns in southeastern Vermont merged with the Girl Scout Council of Vermont to form the Girl Scouts of the Green and White Mountains. The council serves 14,500 girls across New Hampshire and Vermont.

=== Vermont service center ===
- Waterbury

=== Vermont Girl Scout camps ===
- Camp Farnsworth is over 300 acres (1.2 km^{2}) near Thetford. It surrounds 50-acre (0.20 km^{2}) Lake Abenaki. It was started as a girls' camp in 1909 and became a Girl Scout camp in 1959. In 2009 its 100th anniversary was celebrated.
- Twin Hills in Richmond

== Scouting museums in Vermont ==
- Norman Rockwell Museum of Vermont

== See also ==
- Scouting in Québec
