= 14th World Scout Jamboree =

Coordinates: 61°09′N 10°24′E

Nordjamb '75
- 14th World Scout Jamboree
- Location: Lillehammer
- Country: Norway
- Date: 1975
- Attendance: 17,259 Scouts
Previous; 13th World Scout Jamboree	Next; 15th World Scout Jamboree

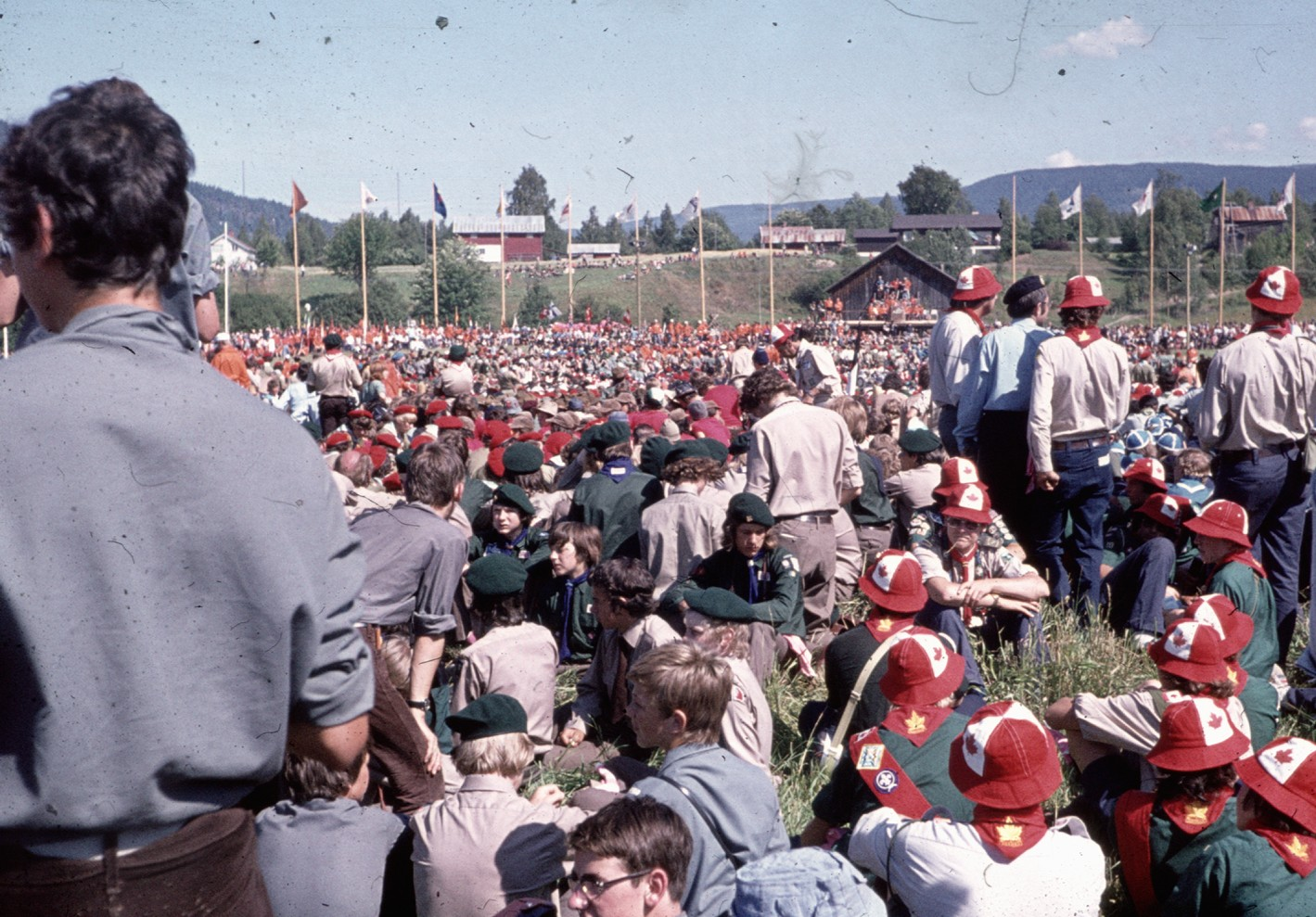
Opening ceremony

The 14th World Scout Jamboree was held from 29 July to 7 August 1975, and was hosted by Norway at Lillehammer, on the shore of the Gudbrandsdalslågen river.

King Olav V and Crown Prince Harald opened "Nordjamb '75", as it became popularly known, in the presence of 17,259 Scouts from 94 countries. Ragnhildur Helgadóttir, the President of the Nordic Council and László Nagy, the Secretary-General of the World Scout Bureau, also spoke at the opening ceremony.

The motto of the jamboree was "Five Fingers, One Hand", representing the international cooperation on the part of the five Nordic countries responsible for its organization. At the opening ceremony, all of the Jamboree participants in the central arena were formed into a giant hand that was photographed from aircraft flying overhead.

This motto stood symbolically for:

- Five fingers separately are small and weak, but together form an efficient and strong unit
- Scouts from all five continents meet at the World Jamboree
- The five Nordic countries jointly host a world event

The British contingent, led by Robert Baden-Powell, 3rd Baron Baden-Powell, included Scouts from Branches in Bermuda, Hong Kong and Rhodesia.

The program of this jamboree included excursions in the mountains by international patrols, activity areas, Nordic trail, choir, visit to Maihaugen cultural museum, and the Jamboree Country Fair. Home hospitality was provided in residences across Scandinavia. The jamboree included in the program several activities involving modern technology, as well as hiking, orienteering and camping.

The two-day hikes were a novel feature for a World Jamboree. The 12,000 Scouts who took part were split into international patrols, which were selected by computer so that the eight members of each patrol came from eight countries and often lacked a common language. Each patrol was led by an experienced Scout from one of the Scandinavian countries. The resulting 1,500 patrols were sent out to their starting point by bus, 750 on each day. 235 routes varying from 12 to 25 km were in the surrounding mountains, mostly above the tree line of about 1,000 metres. There were no tents provided for the overnight stop, but each patrol was provided with a large plastic sheet to serve as a bivouac shelter. A safety team consisted of 100 members of the Norwegian Army with a helicopter available.

The jamboree was also visited by Carl XVI Gustav of Sweden and Crown Prince Mohammed VI of Morocco.

A memorable feature of the jamboree was the weather; having been advised to bring clothing for cool and damp conditions, the campers experienced record high temperatures for Norway of up to 36 °C.

== Campsite ==
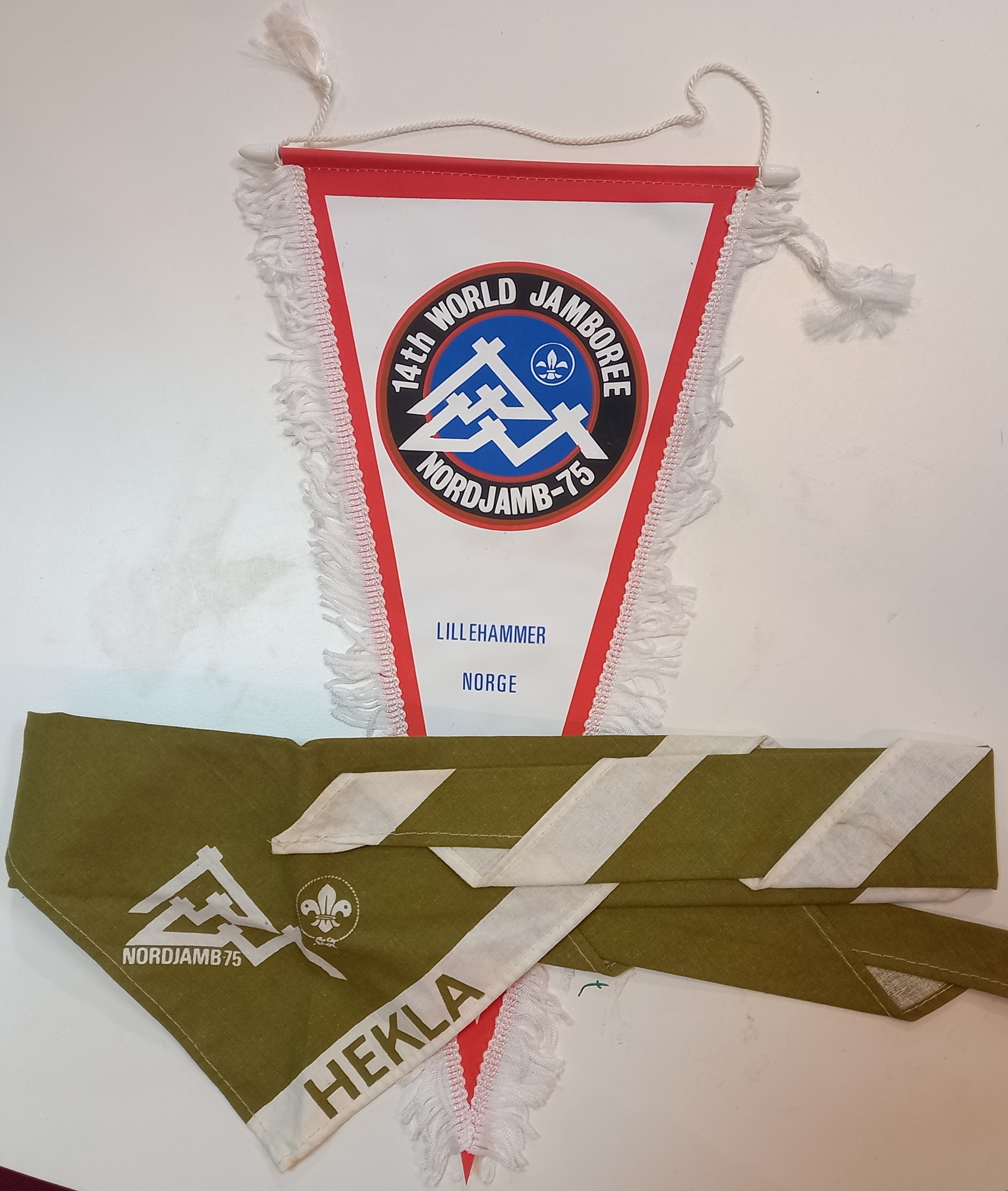
Participant's neckerchief and a souvenir pennant from the 14th World Scout Jamboree. Each subcamp had a different colour neckerchief with the name printed on the back. This is for Hekla Subcamp, named after a volcano in Iceland.

The campground was located on shore of the river Lågen where it enters Lake Mjøsa.

The camp consisted of a central area and ten subcamps:

Subcamps
Number	Name	named after
1	Siljan	Swedish lake in Dalarna
2	Teno	River in Lapland
3	Nordkapp	Northernmost point of Europe
4	Trelleborg	ancient Viking settlement
5	Hekla	Volcano in Iceland
6	Skane	southernmost province of Sweden
7	Jurmo	Finnish Island
8	Dovre	mountain range in Norway
9	Sarek	National Park in northern Sweden
10	Lillebelt	Passage between the Danish island of Funen and Jutland

== Activities ==
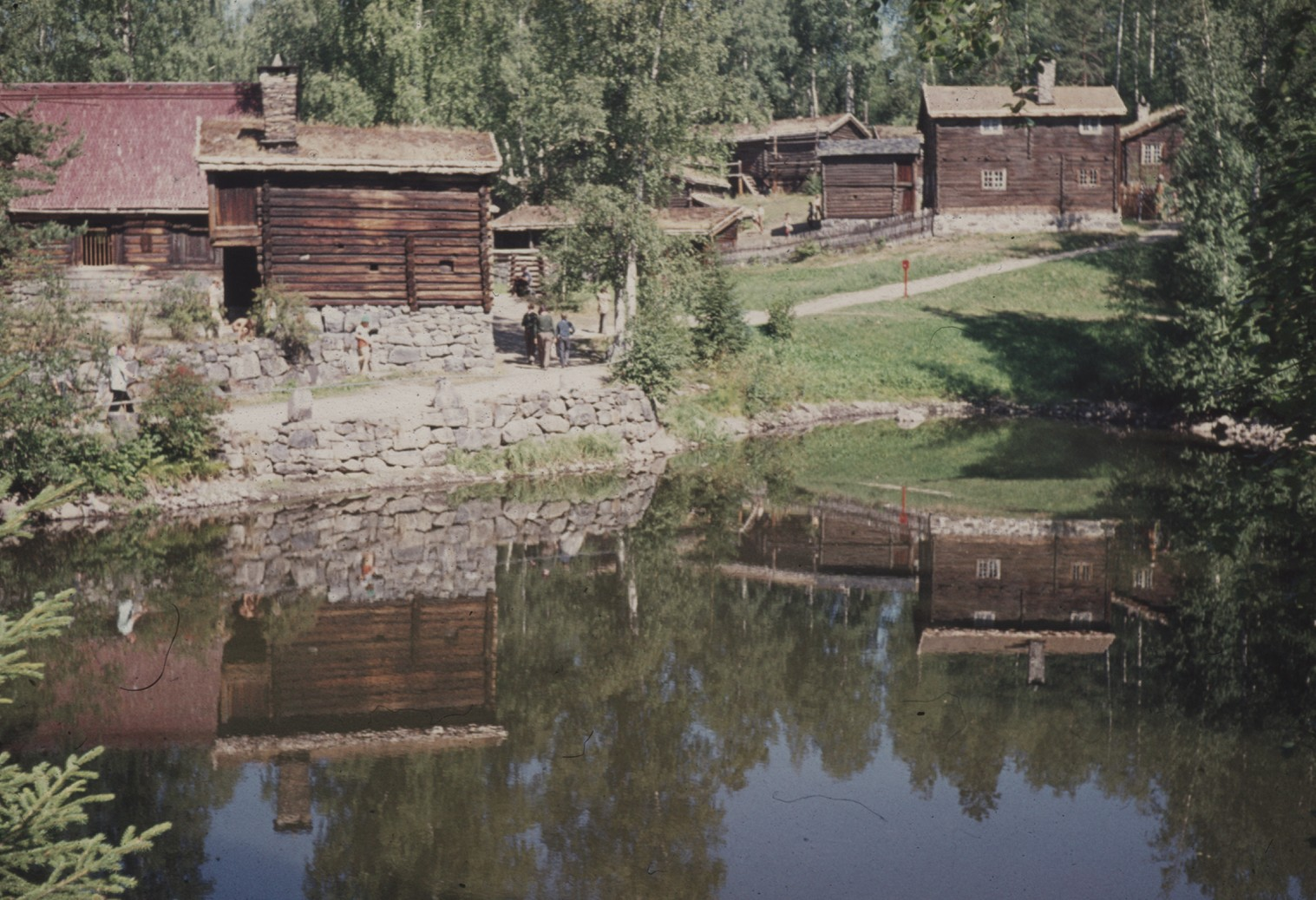
Scouts visiting the Maihaugen open-air museum in Lillehammer.

Each Scout had the opportunity to attend at the following activities:

- Physical Activities
- Water Activities
- The North Trail
- Nature and Conservation
- Handicraft
- Maihaugen (Visit of the Maihaugen museum in Lillehammer)
- Nordic Culture and Democracy
- Modern Technology
- Hike (two-day walk through Nordic area)

On 2 August 1975 the Jamboree County Fair was celebrated. For this event Nord Crowns were issued as Camp currency.

== See also ==
- 1994 Winter Olympics, also held in Lillehammer
