= Dokhtarān-e Pīshāhang-e Īrān =

Scout organization

Fereshtegan-e Pishahang-e Īrān
- 1980s membership badge

- 1970s membership badge

The Girl Scout organization in Iran was known as Dokhtarān-e Pīshāhang-e Īrān (Persian: دختران پیشاهنگ ایران) or Fereshtegān-e Pīshāhang-e Īrān, (Persian: فرشتگان پیش‌آهنگی ایران, literally Angel Scouts of Iran). The Iranian Scouting Girl Scout Section is a former member of the World Association of Girl Guides and Girl Scouts, last mentioned in 1979.

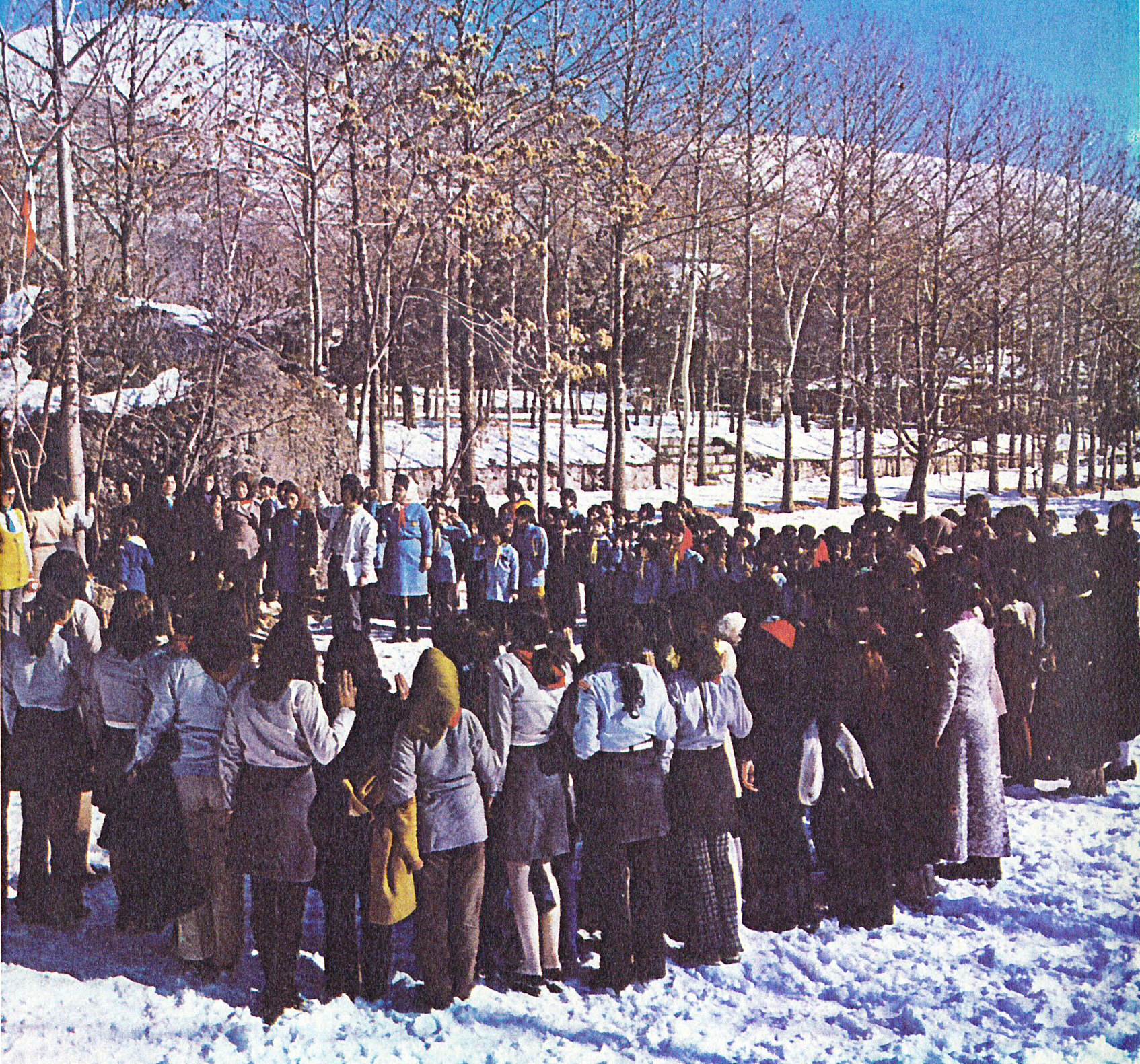
Dokhtarān-e Pishāhang in winter 1976

Girl Guiding may again be making inroads into Iran, as in 1993 a reception was held in Manila, Philippines in conjunction with WAGGGS' Asia Pacific Symposium of NGOs for Women in Development. The aim was to introduce or reintroduce the Girl Guiding/Girl Scouting movement and to explore possibilities of starting/restarting Girl Guiding/Girl Scouting in Iran, as well as Cambodia, Tibet, Russia, Uzbekistan and Vietnam. Fifty women leaders from those nations attended the Asia Pacific Symposium, sharing their Girl Guiding/Girl Scouting experiences.

The emblems used over time reflect a shift from a monarchist government to an Islamic one.
