= New Hampshire Council =

Scouting America council in New Hampshire

New Hampshire Council #330
- Owner: Scouting America
- Headquarters: 1500 Bodwell Rd, Manchester, New Hampshire 03109
- Location: New Hampshire
- Country: United States
- Coordinates: 42.979°N 71.4133°W
- Founded: 1912 as Manchester Council (#330)
- Website https://www.nhscouting.org

New Hampshire Council is a division of Scouting America that serves all of New Hampshire. It was established in 1912.

== History ==
In 1912, the Manchester Council (#330), a volunteer-led council, was organized. On January 9, 1920, the Manchester Council was granted an official charter by the Boy Scouts of America. In 1925, the Manchester Council acquired Camp Manning in Gilmanton for use as a summer camp. While the Manchester Council grew rapidly, the rest of New Hampshire’s Scouting program saw limited growth.

On May 25, 1929, the Manchester Council was renamed the Daniel Webster Council (#330), and expanded to cover Scouting for the entire state. The new name was derived from New Hampshire statesman Daniel Webster.

On February 8, 2025, the council changed its name from Daniel Webster Council to Scouting America New Hampshire.

== Districts ==
Scouting America New Hampshire is split into seven geographical districts covering all of New Hampshire:

- Abnaki District
- Arrowhead District
- Historic District
- Massabesic District
- Mt Monadnock District
- Sunapee District
- Wannalancit District

== Order of the Arrow ==
Scouting America New Hampshire is served by Passaconoway Lodge 220 of the Order of the Arrow. The lodge contains seven chapters, each representing one of the seven districts. Passaconoway Lodge was founded in 1942. The totem of the lodge was chosen as the black bear as the word Passaconaway means “the child of the bear.”

== See also ==
- Scouting in New Hampshire
