= Bronze Wolf Award =

World Organization of the Scout Movement award

- WOSM Bronze wolf medal with ribbon and square knot
- Owner: World Organization of the Scout Movement
- Created: August 2nd, 1935
- Awarded for: Outstanding service to the Scout Movement
- Recipients: 407 (2025)

The World Organization of the Scout Movement's Bronze Wolf Award is presented by it for outstanding international service by an individual to the Scout Movement.

The award consists of a bronze wolf pendant hung on a dark green ribbon bordered by two narrow stripes of yellow.

The World Organization of the Scout Movement (WOSM) has awarded just over 400 Bronze Wolf Awards since it inaugurated its award in 1935. WOSM has restricted the number of recipients in order to maintain the award's significance. Currently, the award is limited to approximately one recipient for every two million members worldwide.

== History ==
WOSM first considered an award in 1924. The topic was reintroduced 1932, with a decision reached in June 1934. The Bronze Wolf award was modelled after The Scout Association's Silver Wolf award. On August 2nd, 1935, WOSM committee unanimously resolved to award the first Bronze Wolf to Robert Baden-Powell.

== Recipients ==
Awards numbered 22, 50, and 84 were withheld, and number 342 was declined for reasons that have never been made public.

Recipients
Award number	Year awarded	Name	Office	Country
1	1935	Robert Baden-Powell	WOSM's Chief Scout of the World; The Boy Scouts Association Chief Scout	United Kingdom
2	1937	Walther von Bonstetten	President/Chief Scout of the Schweizer Pfadfinderbund founder, Kandersteg International Scout Centre	Switzerland
3	1937	Hubert S. Martin	WOSM bureau director The Boy Scouts Association international commissioner	United Kingdom
4	1937	J. S. Wilson	The Boy Scouts Association Gilwell Park camp chief	United Kingdom
5	1949	Ove Holm	WOSM committee organizer, 2nd World Jamboree, Denmark, 1924	Denmark
6	1951	Pierre Delsuc	WOSM committee member international commissioner, France	France
7	1953	Jean Salvaj	WOSM committee Schweizer Pfadfinderbund international commissioner	Switzerland
8	1953	Sten Thiel	WOSM committee Svenska Scoutrådet international commissioner	Sweden
9	1953	Richard T. Lund	WOSM bureau secretary	United Kingdom
10	1955	Jackson Dodds	WOSM committee The Boy Scouts Association, Canadian General Council Deputy Chief Scout	Canada
11	1955	Amory Houghton	WOSM committee Boy Scouts of America president	United States
12	1955	Granville Walton	The Boy Scouts Association (United Kingdom) overseas commissioner	United Kingdom
13	1957	Glad Bincham	WOSM chief international commissioner The Boy Scouts Association international commissioner	United Kingdom
14	1957	Olave Baden-Powell	WOSM hon. vice president World Association of Girl Guides and Girl Scouts Chief Guide of the World	United Kingdom
15	1957	Thomas Corbett, 2nd Baron Rowallan	WOSM committee The Boy Scouts Association's Chief Scout of the British Commonwealth and Empire	United Kingdom
16	1957	Jens Hvass	Det Danske Spejderkorps county commissioner for North Jutland one of the organizers, 1924 World Jamboree, Copenhagen	Denmark
17	1957	Salvador Fernández Beltrán	WOSM traveling commissioner, Latin America	Venezuela
18	1957	Herman van Voorst tot Voorst	WOSM committee De Verkenners van de Katholieke Jeugdbeweging chief commissioner	Netherlands
19	1959	William Durant Campbell	Boy Scouts of America international commissioner	United States
20	1959	John Thurman	The Boy Scouts Association Gilwell Park international training centre camp chief	United Kingdom
21	1959	Jorge B. Vargas	WOSM committee Boy Scouts of the Philippines president	Philippines
22		Withheld		
23	1960	Arthur A. Schuck	Boy Scouts of America chief Scout	United States
24	1961	Rob Lockhart	The Boy Scouts Association Deputy Chief Scout	United Kingdom
25	1961	Daniel Spry	WOSM bureau director	Canada
26	1961	Juan Lainé Desombres	Asociación de Scouts de México, Asociación Civil vice president	Mexico
27	1961	John M. Schiff	WOSM committee Boy Scouts of America president	United States
28	1961	Michiharu Mishima	Boy Scouts of Japan Chief Scout	Japan
29	1963	Demetrios Alexatos	WOSM committee Boy Scouts of Greece (Soma Hellinon Proskopon), national commissioner	Greece
30	1963	John Frederick Colquhoun	The Boy Scouts Association Chief Scout Commissioner	United Kingdom
31	1963	John Durie Stewart	The Boy Scouts Association assistant international commissioner	United Kingdom
32	1965	Hossein Banai	WOSM committee Iran Scout Organization chief commissioner	Iran
33	1965	Gabriel Daza	Boy Scouts of the Philippines president and Chief Scout	Philippines
34	1965	Mohamed Ali Hafez	WOSM committee Boy Scouts of Egypt vice president	Egypt
35	1965	Leslie R. Mordecai	The Boy Scouts Association of Jamaica international commissioner	Jamaica
36	1965	Clement Roy Nichols	WOSM committee The Boy Scouts Association chief commissioner of Australia	Australia
37	1965	Robert Sterne Thomas	The Boy Scouts Association international secretary	United Kingdom
38	1965	Jan Volkmaars	WOSM committee De Nederlandse Padvinders chief commissioner	Netherlands
39	1965	Leslie Whateley	WAGGGS director	United Kingdom
40	1966	Ali Khalifa el-Zaidi	Libya chief commissioner	Libya
41	1967	Joseph Brunton	Boy Scouts of America chief Scout executive	United States
42	1967	Philip R. Cowan	Secretary W.A.C. on Scouting with the handicapped	United States
43	1967	Hidesaburō Kurushima	Boy Scouts of Japan Chief Scout	Japan
44	1967	Charles Maclean, Baron Maclean	The Boy Scouts Association Chief Scout of the British Commonwealth	United Kingdom
45	1967	Demetrios A. Macrides	Boy Scouts of Greece (Soma Hellinon Proskopon) chief commissioner	Greece
46	1967	Guillermo R. Padolina	WOSM region executive commissioner, far east region Boy Scouts of the Philippines director	Philippines
47	1967	Hermenegildo B. Reyes	WOSM committee Boy Scouts of the Philippines international commissioner	Philippines
48	1967	Percival Alfred Siebold	WOSM executive commissioner, operations	United Kingdom
49	1967	Philip Alphonse Tossijn	WOSM committee Boy Scouts of Belgium international Commissioner	Belgium
50		Withheld		
51	1969	Ali al-Dandachi	WOSM committee and WOSM Arab region executive commissioner Boy Scouts of Syria president, Syria	Syria
52	1969	Niels Engberg	WOSM committee Danish Boy Scouts international commissioner	Denmark
53	1969	Irving J. Feist	WOSM reorganization committee chairman Boy Scouts of America president	United States
54	1969	Fred Hurll	The Scout Association chief executive commissioner	United Kingdom
55	1969	Niaz Mohammad Khan	WOSM committee Boy Scouts Association of Pakistan chief commissioner	Pakistan
56	1969	Lakshmi Mazumdar	Bharat Scouts and Guides national commissioner	India
57	1969	Gustavo J. Vollmer	WOSM committee chairman and inter-American committee president	Venezuela
58	1971	Aziz Osman Bakir	WOSM Arab region bureau general secretary	Egypt
59	1971	Yehuda Barkai	Israel Boy Scouts international commissioner	Israel
60	1971	Abhai Chandavimol	WOSM committee	Thailand
61	1971	Antonio C. Delgado	WOSM committee vice-chairman	Philippines
62	1971	Bruce H. Garnsey	WOSM Asia-Pacific committee chairman The Australian Boy Scouts Association commissioner	Australia
63	1971	Charles Dymoke Green, Jr.	WOSM committee chairman The Scout Association commissioner	United Kingdom
64	1971	Odd Hopp	Boy Scouts of Norway secretary general	Norway
65	1971	Taizō Ishizaka	Boy Scouts of Nippon president	Japan
66	1971	Arthur H. Johnstone	The Boy Scouts Association of South Africa president	South Africa
67	1971	John F. Lott	Boy Scouts of America national committee of volunteer training chairman	United States
68	1971	Émile F. Luke	Boy Scouts Association of Sierra Leone Chief Scout	Sierra Leone
69	1971	Francisco Macías Valadéz	Asociación de Scouts de México, Asociación Civil international commissioner	Mexico
70	1971	Albert Abdoulaye N'Diaye	WOSM Africa committee vice-chairman	Senegal
71	1971	Leonard Nicholson	Boy Scouts of Canada Deputy Chief Scout	Canada
72	1971	Gilbert R. Pirrung	WOSM inter-American committee vice chairman	United States
73	1972	Saburō Matsukata	WOSM committee Boy Scouts of Nippon Chief Scout	Japan
74	1973	Hamengkubuwono IX	Gerakan Pramuka Indonesia chairman	Indonesia
75	1973	Charles Celier	WOSM committee and administration committee chairman	France
76	1973	Kingsley C. Dassanaike	WOSM extension committee	Sri Lanka
77	1973	William Harrison Fetridge	WOSM finance planning committee	United States
78	1973	Donald FitzRitson	Boy Scouts Association of Jamaica chief commissioner	Jamaica
79	1973	Robin Gold	The Scout Association international commissioner	United Kingdom
80	1973	Muhammad el-Hibri	WOSM Arab region committee	Lebanon
81	1973	Len Jarrett	WOSM bureau director of administration	United Kingdom
82	1973	Elías Mendoza Habersperger	WOSM committee	Peru
83	1973	Kenan H. Ng'ambi	WOSM Africa committee	Zambia
84		Withheld		
85	1974	Armando Gálvez	Asociación de Scouts de Guatemala national executive commissioner	Guatemala
86	1974	James B. Harvey	Boy Scouts of Canada international commissioner	Canada
87	1974	Syed Hashim Abdullah	Boy Scouts Association of Malaysia National Chief Commissioner	Malaysia
88	1974	Paul König	Germany international commissioner	Germany
89	1974	Luis Esteban Palacios	WOSM inter-American committee chairman	Venezuela
90	1974	Leonidas J. Skyrianidis	Boy Scouts of Greece (Soma Hellinon Proskopon) commissioner	Greece
91	1974	Victor Steiner, Sr.	Asociación de Scouts de El Salvador president	El Salvador
92	1974	Jack C. K. Teng	Boy Scouts of China international commissioner	Taiwan, China
93	1974	George F. Witchell	The Scout Association travelling commissioner	United Kingdom
94	1975	Alden G. Barber	Boy Scouts of America chief Scout executive	United States
95	1975	E. Bower Carty	WOSM committee chairman	Canada
96	1975	Bernard Chacksfield	WOSM committee	United Kingdom
97	1975	Richard W. Darrow	WOSM public relations and communications committee chairman	United States
98	1975	Arthur Eugster	WOSM Europe region treasurer	Switzerland
99	1975	Emmett Harmon	WOSM committee	Liberia
100	1975	Kim Yong-woo	Korea Scout Association chief Scout	Korea
101	1975	Johan Kromann	WOSM programme committee chairman	Denmark
102	1975	Alexander D. Paterson	The Scout Association of New Zealand assistant international commissioner	New Zealand
103	1975	Jorge Toral Azuela	Asociación de Scouts de México, Asociación Civil international commissioner	Mexico
104	1975	Ralph Reader	The Scout Association council member and Gang Show founder	United Kingdom
105	1975	Shintarō Negishi	Boy Scouts of Nippon executive committee	Japan
106	1976	Adolfo Aristeguieta Gramcko	WOSM research task force	Venezuela
107	1976	Chitra Dansuputra	WOSM Asia-Pacific committee	Thailand
108	1976	Victor J. Clapham	WOSM programme committee and public relations committee	South Africa
109	1977	Ernest Mehinto	WOSM Africa region committee	Benin
110	1976	Leonard A. Robinson	WOSM extension committee	United Kingdom
111	1976	Shieh You-hwa	WOSM Asia-Pacific committee	Taiwan, China
112	1977	Bennett B. Shotade	WOSM Africa region commissioner	Nigeria
113	1976	Kenneth H. Stevens	The Scout Association chief executive commissioner	United Kingdom
114	1976	Abdallah Zouaghi	WOSM Arab region committee	Tunisia
115	1977	Edward J. Montgomery	Scout Association of Ireland international commissioner	Ireland
116	1977	Wally Denny	Boy Scouts of Canada deputy chief Scout	Canada
117	1977	Laurent Dominicé	WOSM committee treasurer	Switzerland
118	1977	A. Erik Ende	Svenska Scoutrådet president	Sweden
119	1977	Farid Karam	WOSM committee	Lebanon
120	1977	Julio Montes Taracena	WOSM committee	Guatemala
121	1977	László Nagy	WOSM secretary general	Hungary
122	1977	John Cook Parish	Boy Scouts of America international commissioner,	United States
123	1977	José Plaridel Silvestre	WOSM Asia-Pacific region commissioner	Philippines
124	1977	Akira Watanabe	WOSM committee	Japan
125	1978	Sven H. Bauer	Svenska Scoutrådet international commissioner	Sweden
126	1978	Peter Cooke	The Scout Association overseas secretary/Commonwealth secretary	United Kingdom
127	1978	John M. Lioufis	Commissioner for Greek Scouts in Egypt	Egypt
128	1978	J. Percy Ross	Boy Scouts of Canada chief executive	Canada
129	1978	Abdul Azis Saleh	WOSM committee	Indonesia
130	1978	James W. Sands	Boy Scouts of America international division director	United States
131	1978	Mahmoud el-Alamy	Fédération Nationale du Scoutisme Marocain president	Morocco
132	1978	Leslie R. Mitchell	Founder of Jamboree-on-the-Air	United Kingdom
133	1978	Kourkène Medzadourian	Armenian Scouts chief scout and international commissioner,	Armenia (in exile)
134	1979	Jorge Maria Cui	WOSM Asia-Pacific committee	Philippines
135	1979	Federico Díaz Legórburu	WOSM committee	Venezuela
136	1979	Nicolas Hosch	Lëtzebuerger Guiden a Scouten international commissioner	Luxembourg
137	1979	Hartmut Keyler	WOSM committee and European region committee	Germany
138	1979	F. O. Ogunlana	WOSM Africa region treasurer	Nigeria
139	1979	Arthur W. V. Reeve	The Scout Association of New Zealand international commissioner	New Zealand
140	1980	Ibrahim Zakaria	Boy Scouts of Syria international commissioner	Syria
141	1980	Savvas Kokkinides	Cyprus Scouts Association international commissioner	Cyprus
142	1980	Kong Visudharomn	National Scout Organization of Thailand deputy international commissioner	Thailand
143	1980	Henry C. Ma	Scout Association of Hong Kong chief commissioner	Hong Kong
144	1981	Páll Gíslason	Icelandic Boy and Girl Scout Association (Bandalag íslenskra skáta) chief scout	Iceland
145	1981	Hassan Al-Ali	Kuwait Boy Scouts Association general secretary and international commissioner	Kuwait
146	1981	John Randolph Donnell	Boy Scouts of America Foundation, United States fund for international scouting (USFIS) chairman	United States
147	1981	Robbert Hartog	WOSM educational methods group chairman	Canada
148	1981	Mansour Mohamed El-Kikhia	WOSM Arab region committee chairman	Libya
149	1981	Yorihiro Matsudaira	Boy Scouts of Nippon international commissioner	Japan
150	1981	Salomon Tandeng Muna	WOSM committee	Cameroon
151	1981	Rashid Shoucair	Lebanese Scouting Federation president	Lebanon
152	1982	H. Eric Frank	The Scout Association assistant international commissioner	United Kingdom
153	1982	Jeremiah J. M. Nyagah	WOSM committee	Kenya
154	1982	Carl XVI Gustaf of Sweden	World Scout Foundation	Sweden
155	1982	Marcus Wallenberg, Jr.	World Scout Foundation	Sweden
156	1982	Gamal Khashaba	WOSM Arab bureau general secretary Boy Scouts of Egypt national committee for Air Scouts president	Egypt
157	1982	Chen Chung-shin	Boy Scouts of China general secretary	Taiwan, China
158	1982	John Beng Kiat Liem	WOSM Asia-Pacific region committee	Indonesia
159	1983	Pierre Bodineau	WOSM European region committee	France
160	1983	Kamarul Ariffin Mohd Yassin	WOSM Committee chairman	Malaysia
161	1983	Robert Baden-Powell, 3rd Baron Baden-Powell	The Scout Association vice-president	United Kingdom
162	1983	H. Morrey Cross	Boy Scouts of Canada international commissioner	Canada
163	1983	Luc M. Lacroix	Association des Scouts du Rwanda treasurer	Canada
164	1983	John L. MacGregor	Boy Scouts of Canada relationships committee executive director	Canada
165	1983	Charles A. Martin	The Scout Association of Zimbabwe international commissioner	Zimbabwe
166	1983	Mohamed H. Fhema	WOSM Arab region committee chairman	Libya
167	1983	Peter W. Hummel	WOSM committee vice-chairman	United States
168	1983	Henning Mysager	WOSM committee vice-chairman	Denmark
169	1983	Abdullah Omar Nasseef	WOSM Arab region committee chairman	Saudi Arabia
170	1983	J. L. Tarr	Boy Scouts of America chief Scout executive	United States
171	1984	Desmond J. Fay	Scout Association of Ireland national executive board	Ireland
172	1984	August S. Narumi	Boy Scouts of Nippon national board of trustees	Japan
173	1984	Bhethai Amatayakul	WOSM Asia-Pacific region committee	Thailand
174	1985	Ichirō Terao	Boy Scouts of Nippon board chairman	Japan
175	1985	Malek K. Gabr	WOSM bureau director, educational methods	Egypt
176	1985	Sir William Gladstone, 7th Baronet	WOSM committee chairman	United Kingdom
177	1985	William Hillcourt	Author, Scouting publications	United States
178	1985	Gisle Johnson	WOSM European region committee chairman	Norway
179	1985	Edward C. Joullian III	Boy Scouts of America president	United States
180	1985	Helen M. Laird	WAGGGS committee chairman	United Kingdom
181	1985	Mashudi	WOSM Asia-Pacific region committee	Indonesia
182	1985	Eugene F. Reid	Boy Scouts of America international commissioner	United States
183	1985	W. Charles Williams	Founder member, Baden-Powell House board	United Kingdom
184	1985	Jeremiah J. Kelly	WOSM committee vice-chairman	Ireland
185	1986	Yoshio Sakurauchi	Member, Board of Governors, Japan	Japan
186	1986	Fawzi Farghali	WOSM Arab region executive	Egypt
187	1986	John R. Phillpot	The Scout Association of the Bahamas international commissioner	Bahamas
188	1987	Kao Ming-huey	Boy Scouts of China international commissioner	Taiwan, China
189	1988	Chu Chang-kyun	Korea Scout Association president	Korea
190	1988	Franz Dunshirn	Pfadfinder und Pfadfinderinnen Österreichs president	Austria
191	1988	Arne Lundberg	Swedish Temperance Guide and Scout Association chairman and chief Scout,	Sweden
192	1988	Thomas C. MacAvoy	President, Boy Scouts of America	United States
193	1988	Mario Sica	International Commissioner, Italy	Italy
194	1988	Lakshman Singh	Bharat Scouts and Guides national commissioner	India
195	1988	Frederick Stecker	Boy Scouts of America Foundation, United States fund for international scouting (USFIS)	United States
196	1988	Fritz Vollmar	World Scout Foundation director general	Switzerland
197	1988	Marc Noble	WOSM budget and treasury committee chairman The Scout Association commonwealth commissioner	United Kingdom
198	1988	Margot Bogert	WOSM development committee Boy Scouts of America Foundation, United States fund for international scouting (USFIS)	United States
199	1988	Victor Brenes	Costa Rica minister of education and Asociación de Scouts de Costa Rica national council	Costa Rica
200	1989	Ken Harada	Boy Scouts of Nippon board	Japan
201	1989	Ezra Taft Benson	Church of Jesus Christ of Latter Day Saints president	United States
202	1990	James Blain	Scouts Canada chief executive	Canada
203	1990	Chau Cham-son	The Scout Association of Hong Kong chief commissioner	Hong Kong
204	1990	John R. Donnell Jr.	Boy Scouts of America international commissioner	United States
205	1990	Carveth Geach	Boy Scouts of South Africa deputy national president	South Africa
206	1990	Manzoor Ul Karim	Bangladesh Scouts chief national commissioner	Bangladesh
207	1990	Wolf Kuhnke	Ring deutscher Pfadfinderverbände and chairman	Germany
208	1990	Ben H. Love	Boy Scouts of America chief scout executive	United States
209	1990	Bunsom Martin	WOSM committee	Thailand
210	1990	Tsui Teh-li	Boy Scouts of China executive board	Taiwan, China
211	1990	René Sibomana	Association des Scouts du Rwanda general commissioner,	Rwanda
212	1990	Norman S. Johnson	WOSM Committee; The Scout Association of Australia chairman national executive committee	Australia
213	1990	Hussein Sabry Gad El Mula	WOSM Arab region treasurer	Egypt
214	1991	S. Gary Schiller	WOSM committee Boy Scouts of America	United States
215	1991	Masaru Ibuka	Boy Scouts of Nippon board chairman	Japan
216	1991	Jos Loos	Lëtzebuerger Guiden a Scouten international commissioner and general commissioner	Luxembourg
217	1992	Nicos Kalogeras	WOSM European region committee Kandersteg International Scout Centre committee chairman Scouts of Greece (Soma Hellinon Proskopon) chief commissioner	Greece
218	1992	Ayakazu Hirose	Boy Scouts of Nippon board and national executive council chairman	Japan
219	1992	Francisco S. Román	WOSM Asia-Pacific region committee chairman Boy Scouts of the Philippines president	Philippines
220	1992	Thomas D. Allen	WOSM program committee Boy Scouts of America national executive board and international committee Boy Scouts of America Foundation, United States fund for international scouting (USFIS) secretary	United States
221	1992	John W. Beresford	WOSM committee chairman, constitutions committee and bureau	United Kingdom
222	1992	John A. Landau	The Scout Association of Zimbabwe chief Scout	Zimbabwe
223	1993	Ee Peng Liang	Singapore Scout Association president	Singapore
224	1993	Ghous Ali Shah	WOSM Asia-Pacific region committee Pakistan Boy Scouts Association chief commissioner	Pakistan
225	1993	Kim Yong-wan	Korea Scout Association vice-president	Korea
226	1993	Thomas S. Monson	Church of Jesus Christ of Latter Day Saints president Boy Scouts of America national executive board	United States
227	1993	Fidel Ramos	Boy Scouts of the Philippines chief Scout	Philippines
228	1993	Jørgen Guldborg-Rasmussen	Danish Scout and Guide Association council president and national board	Denmark
229	1993	Tassos Sagos	Scouts of Greece (Soma Hellinon Proskopon) international commissioner	Greece
230	1993	Kō Yoshida	WOSM committee World Scout Foundation board Boy Scouts of Nippon international commissioner	Japan
231	1993	Sven Erik Ragnar	World Scout Foundation board treasurer, Helenelund Scout Center Foundation secretary/treasurer	Sweden
232	1994	Muhamad Abu Hena	WOSM Asia-Pacific region committee chairman Bangladesh Scouts international commissioner	Bangladesh
233	1994	Costas Constantinou	Cyprus Scouts Association chief commissioner	Cyprus
234	1994	Garnet de la Hunt	WOSM Africa region committee vice-chairman Boy Scouts of South Africa chief Scout	South Africa
235	1994	Mohammed Saleh Al Qahtani	WOSM Arab region committee Boy Scouts of Bahrain board	Bahrain
236	1994	George I. Fairbairn	The Scout Association of New Zealand international commissioner	New Zealand
237	1994	Princess Benedikte of Denmark	Girl Guides Denmark joint committee chairman and Danish committee for the support of international Guide and Scout purposes honorary chairman	Denmark
238	1994	Goddanti Ranga Rao	Bharat Scouts and Guides director	India
239	1995	Roberto Dorion	WOSM inter-American region committee chairman Asociación de Scouts de Guatemala president and international commissioner	Guatemala
240	1995	Samih Abdel Fattah Iskandar	WOSM Arab region committee chairman Jordanian Association for Boy Scouts and Girl Guides international commissioner	Jordan
241	1995	Kim Suk-won	WOSM committee World Scout Foundation vice chairman Korea Scout Association president	Korea
242	1995	Liu Chih-yun	Boy Scouts of China deputy international commissioner	Taiwan, China
243	1995	Frank Smith	WOSM training Committee; The Scout Association national training committee chairman	United Kingdom
244	1995	Fernando Soto-Hay y García	Former WOSM inter-American training commission chairman Asociación de Scouts de México, Asociación Civil national court of honour	Mexico
245	1995	Jean, Grand Duke of Luxembourg	Luxembourg Boy Scout Association chief Scout	Luxembourg
246	1996	Benoît Blanpain	International Catholic Conference of Scouting secretary general FSC Belgium general commissioner	Belgium
247	1996	Alexander Comninos	Scouts of Greece (Soma Hellinon Proskopon) president	Greece
248	1996	Reginald K. Groome	WOSM committee World Scout Foundation board Scouts Canada president and international commissioner	Canada
249	1996	Colin James Inglis	South African Scout Association chief Scout and international commissioner	South Africa
250	1996	Lars Kolind	WOSM programme committee chairman KFUM Spejderne i Danmark national general assembly chairman	Denmark
251	1996	Piet J. Kroonenberg	WOSM European region committee historical consultant Author on Scout history	Netherlands
252	1996	Richard Middelkoop	Jamboree-On-The-Air (JOTA) coordinator	Netherlands
253	1996	Luc Panissod	WOSM deputy secretary general	France
254	1996	Mohamed Saad El Din Sherif	Chairman of Arab Scout Parliamentary Union; President of Arab IFOFSAG	Egypt
255	1996	Bertil Tunje	WOSM committee vice-chairman	Sweden
256	1996	Wu Shoei-yun	WOSM Asia-Pacific region committee Boy Scouts of China international commissioner	Taiwan, China
257	1997	Billy Goh	Singapore Scout Association assistant chief commissioner and international commissioner	Singapore
258	1997	Gilberth González	WOSM inter-American region director of operations Inter-American Scout Foundation executive director and board member Asociación de Guías y Scouts de Costa Rica executive director	Costa Rica
259	1997	Salomon Matalon	Founder of Eclaireurs in Senegal	France
260	1997	Jere Ratcliffe	Boy Scouts of America chief scout executive	United States
261	1997	Sumon Samasarn	National Scout Organization of Thailand, national training commissioner	Thailand
262	1997	Abdoulaye Sar	WOSM bureau community development director	Senegal
263	1997	Daniel Oscar Tagata	WOSM inter-American region office community development executive and management development director Asociacion de Scouts del Peru president	Peru
264	1998	Baldur Hermans	Ring deutscher Pfadfinderverbände international commissioner Deutsche Pfadfinderschaft Sankt Georg international commissioner	Germany
265	1998	Kim Chong-hoh	World Scout Parliamentary Union president emeritus	Korea
266	1998	Sutham Phanthusak	WOSM Asia-Pacific region committee vice-chairman Thai National Scout Council and public relations commissioner	Thailand
267	1998	Fayeq Hamdi Tahboub	Palestinian Scout Association international commissioner	Palestinian Authority
268	1998	Teiji Takemiya	WOSM Asia-Pacific region committee Scout Association of Japan board of trustees and deputy international commissioner	Japan
269	1998	Geoffrey W. Wheatley	WOSM inter-American region committee chairman	Canada
270	1998	Morris Zilka	Israel Boy and Girl Scout Federation chief commissioner	Israel
271	1998	Nicolas Ambroise N'Diaye	Scoutisme d'Afrique Occidentale Française commissaire général des Scouts et Guides du Sénégal commissaire général Confédération Sénégalaise du Scoutisme président	Senegal
272	1998	Betty Clay	Robert Baden-Powell's daughter	United Kingdom
273	1999	Mateo Jover	former WOSM bureau program director, prospective studies and documentation director, European region office development education director and inter-American region office director of research	
274	1999	Vladimir Lomeiko	World Scout Foundation vice-president	Belarus
275	1999	Malick M'Baye	Executive Secretary to the Director General of Unesco; National and International Trainer in Senegal; Advisor to WOSM on relationship with Unesco	Senegal
276	1999	Jack McCracken	Scouts Canada international relations committee,	Canada
277	1999	Park Kun-bae	WOSM committee Korea Scout Association president	Korea
278	1999	A. Francis Small	WOSM Asia-Pacific region committee vice-chairman, The Scout Association of New Zealand president	New Zealand
279	1999	Mohamed Ben Ali Triki	WOSM Arab region committee chairman Les Scouts Tunisiens president	Tunisia
280	1999	Jacques Moreillon	WOSM secretary general	Switzerland
281	1999	Neil M. Westaway	WOSM committee chairman and its SCORE International board chairman The Scout Association of Australia chief commissioner	Australia
282	2000	Ivo Stern Becka	WOSM inter-American committee chairman Asociación de Scouts de México, Asociación Civil chairman	Mexico
283	2000	Abdelaziz Drissi-Kacemi	Moroccan Scout Federation president Moroccan Scout Association president International symposium, Scouting: Youth without borders chairman	Morocco
284	2000	Herman Hui	Scout Association of Hong Kong deputy chief commissioner	Hong Kong
285	2000	Paula Peláez	Guides and Scouts of Chile president	Chile
286	2000	Mostafa Salem	WOSM committee and programme committee chairman	Libya
287	2001	Robert Wilmes	WOSM representative to UNESCO NGO committee	France
288	2001	Stewart J. Hawkins	WOSM European region committee chairman European Scout Foundation chairman The Scout Association international commissioner	United Kingdom
289	2001	A. Geoffrey Lee	WOSM Asia-Pacific region committee vice-chairman The Scout Association of Australia international commissioner	Australia
290	2002	Ali Ali El Morsi	International Commissioner and vice-president, Egyptian Scout Federation	Egypt
291	2002	Kim Kyu-young	WOSM Asia-Pacific region director	Korea
292	2002	Jiří Navrátil	Junak - svaz skautu a skautek CR president	Czech Republic
293	2002	Philippe Pijollet	WOSM bureau adult resources director	France
294	2002	William George Wells	The Scout Association of Australia chief commissioner	Australia
295	2003	Garth Morrison	WOSM committee The Scout Association chief Scout	United Kingdom
296	2003	Chao Shou-Po	Scouts of China national council and executive board	Taiwan, China
297	2003	Manuel Pinto	WOSM Africa region committee chairman	Uganda
298	2003	Léonard Offoumou Yapo	WOSM Africa region committee chairman Africa Scout Foundation president	Côte d Ivoire
299	2004	Richard Burdick	Boy Scouts of America international commissioner	United States
300	2004	Fujio Imada	Scout Association of Japan deputy national commissioner and deputy international commissioner,	Japan
301	2004	Patrick Lyon d'Andrimont	WOSM committee vice-chairman	Chile
302	2004	Jack Sinclair	President and International Commissioner, Scouts Canada	Canada
303	2004	Costas Tsantilis	WOSM committee Scouts of Greece (Soma Hellinon Proskopon) chief and international Commissioner	Greece
304	2005	Mohamed Afilal	WOSM Arab region chairman Fédération Nationale du Scoutisme Marocain président délégué,	Morocco
305	2005	Saiful Islam Khan	WOSM Asia-Pacific region marketing committee Bangladesh Scouts national commissioner for public relations and publication	Bangladesh
306	2005	Christos Lygeros	WOSM adult resources committee chairman Scouts of Greece (Soma Hellinon Proskopon) national board chairman	Greece
307	2005	Anthony Thng	WOSM Asia-Pacific region chairman Singapore Scout Association international commissioner	Singapore
308	2005	Jerry Voros	Boy Scouts of America international committee chairman	United States
309	2006	David Bull	WOSM European region committee chairman The Scout Association international commissioner	United Kingdom
310	2006	Klaus Johann Jacobs	World Scout Foundation chairman	Switzerland
311	2006	Bhumibol Adulyadej	National Scout Organization of Thailand chief scout	Thailand
312	2007	Kirsty M. Brown	WOSM educational methods group, adult resources committee chairman and Asia-Pacific region committee vice-chairman	Australia
313	2007	Henry R. Hall	The Scout Association vice-president Baden-Powell Fellowship member Friends of Scouting in Europe member	United Kingdom
314	2007	Toby Suzuki	WOSM committee	Japan
315	2008	Bill Cockcroft	The Scout Association chief Scout commissioner and 21st World Scout Jamboree director	United Kingdom
316	2008	Rick Cronk	World Scout Foundation chairman	United States
317	2008	Lalit Mohan Jain	WOSM Asia-Pacific region committee Bharat Scouts and Guides national commissioner	India
318	2008	Yongyudh Vajaradul	WOSM Asia-Pacific region committee World Buddhist Scout Brotherhood chairman	Thailand
319	2009	Ahmed Abd Ellatif	WOSM Arab region committee chairman	Egypt
320	2009	Eberhard von Koerber	World Scout Foundation chairman	Germany
321	2009	Dominique Bénard	WOSM committee vice-chairman and deputy secretary general	France
322	2010	Philippe Da Costa	WOSM committee president Scouts de France commissaire général	France
323	2010	Howard Kilroy	World Scout Foundation chairman	Ireland
324	2010	Katsura Kuno	WOSM Asia-Pacific region public relations subcommittee and region task force 2007; Scout Association of Japan advisor and international commissioner	Japan
325	2010	Wayne M. Perry	WOSM committee Boy Scouts of America international commissioner	United States
326	2010	Derek Pollard	WOSM constitutions committee chairman World Scout Foundation board The Scout Association chief commissioner for England	United Kingdom
327	2010	John Ravenhall	WOSM Asia-Pacific region committee, training committee and adult resources committee The Scout Association of Australia chief commissioner	Australia
328	2010	Alexander Wong	WOSM Asia-Pacific region governance review task force chairman Scout Association of Hong Kong assistant chief commissioner and international commissioner	Hong Kong
329	2011	Fathy Farghali	WOSM Arab region office deputy region director and community development director	Egypt
330	2011	David B. Huestis	World Scout Foundation board	Canada
331	2011	Thijs Stoffer	Kandersteg International Scout Centre committee chairman	Netherlands
332	2011	Abdullah of Saudi Arabia	King of Saudi Arabia; Custodian of the Two Holy Mosques	Saudi Arabia
333	2011	Faisal bin Abdullah bin Mohammed Al Saud	Saudi Arabia Scout Association chief Scout	Saudi Arabia
334	2012	Mohammad Habibul Alam	WOSM committee vice-chairman Bangladesh Scouts international committee vice-president	Bangladesh
335	2012	Georges El-Ghorayeb	WOSM committee Les Scouts de Liban president Lebanese Scouting Federation international commissioner	Lebanon
336	2012	Zuhair Ghunaim	International Union of Muslim Scouts secretary general	Saudi Arabia
337	2012	Yoritake Matsudaira	WOSM Asia-Pacific region committee Scout Association of Japan board of directors and international commissioner Founding member, World Buddhist Scout Brotherhood	Japan
338	2012	Maggie Shaddick	Scouts Canada Quebec council and assistant provincial commissioner international	Canada
339	2012	Scott A. Teare	Boy Scouts of America international division director	United States
340	2012	Derek Twine	The Scout Association chief executive	United Kingdom
341	2013	Abdullah Rasheed	WOSM bureau Asia-Pacific region director	Maldives
342		Declined		
343	2014	Mario Díaz Martínez	WOSM committee vice-chairman	Spain
344	2015	Thérèse Bermingham	WOSM committee vice-chairman and European region committee chairman	Ireland
345	2015	Christian Larcher	Scouts du France international commissioner	France
346	2015	Alain Silberstein	International Forum of Jewish Scouts (ifjs) president	France
347	2016	Amos Ilani	Israel Boy and Girl Scouts Federation chief commissioner	Israel
348	2016	Sultan bin Muhammad Al-Qasimi	Sharjah Emirate patron of the Scout Movement	United Arab Emirates
349	2016	Marc Lombard	Kandersteg International Scout Centre Foundation chairman	Switzerland
350	2016	Shree Ram Lamichhane	WOSM Asia-Pacific region committee first vice-chairman	Nepal
351	2016	John C. C. May	WOSM committee vice-chairman	United Kingdom
352	2016	John Neysmith	WOSM committee	Canada
353	2016	Christos Papageorgiou	International Link of Orthodox Christian Scouts secretary general,	Greece
354	2017	Wahid Labidi	WOSM committee vice-chairman	Tunisia
355	2017	Reiko Suzuki	WOSM Asia-Pacific region committee vice chairman	Japan
356	2017	Kent Clayburn	WOSM inter-American region committee vice chairman Boy Scouts of America national executive board	United States
357	2017	Mohamad Effendy Rajab	Singapore Scout Association executive director	Singapore
358	2017	Siegfried Weiser	World Scout Foundation board chairman	Germany
359	2017	Winston Adams	WOSM bureau Africa Scout Foundation	South Africa
360	2017	Jonathan How	The Scout Association advisor on spiritual and religious development	United Kingdom
361	2017	Melissa Martins Casagrande	WOSM governance review task force	Brazil
362	2017	Mari Nakano	former WOSM committee Scout Association of Japan	Japan
363	2018	João Armando Gonçalves	WOSM committee chairman	Portugal
364	2018	Karin Ahlbäck	WOSM committee	Finland
365	2018	Ian Langford-Brown	WOSM bureau internal auditor	Australia
366	2018	Brigitte Therivel	Boy Scouts of America international ambassador	United States
367	2018	Laila Almeldeen	WOSM Arab region office head of communication	Egypt
368	2018	Jejomar Cabauatan Binay	WOSM Asia-Pacific region committee chairman	Philippines
369	2019	Dan Ownby	WOSM committee vice-chairman	United States
370	2019	Anne Whiteford	WOSM educational methods, research and development executive director	United Kingdom
371	2019	Paul Parkinson	WOSM Asia-Pacific region committee chairman	Australia
372	2020	Göran Hägerdal	WOSM bureau, global director, camp chief WSJ 2011	Sweden
373	2020	David Wynne Jones	former The Scout Association of Australia APR financial resources sub-committee chair	Australia
374	2020	W. Scott Sorrels	2019 World Scout Jamboree organizing committee co-chairman	United States
375	2020	Walter Hofstetter	former WOSM committee, 1999–2005 and 9th World Scout Moot at Kandersteg camp chief	Switzerland
376	2020	Stephen Peck	WOSM events senior director The Scout Association Gilwell Park camp chief	United Kingdom
377	2021	Rabbi Peter Hyman	Former chair of the "Messenger of Peace" initiative	United States
378	2021	Héctor Carrer	WOSM educational methods leader	Argentina
379	2021	Malcolm Tan	WOSM safe from harm, Scout method and other volunteer.	Singapore
380	2021	Peter Blatch	Former WOSM committee	Australia
381	2021	Roger Mosby	Boy Scouts of America chief Scout executive,	United States
382	2022	Jemima Nartey	Former WOSM committee	Ghana
383	2022	Craig Turpie	Former WOSM committee chairman	United Kingdom
384	2022	Chay Hong Leng	WOSM finance committee	Singapore
385	2022	Omar Lugo Aguirre	WOSM 24th World Scout Jamboree executive committee co-chair	Mexico
386	2023	Tan Cheng Kiong	WOSM 2017 conference vice-chair Former Singapore Scouts Association chief commissioner,	Singapore
387	2023	Joseph Lau Yee Leung	Former WOSM treasurer	Hong Kong
388	2023	Máire Fitzgerald	WOSM committee youth advisor	Ireland
389	2023	Fredrik Gottlieb	World Scout Foundation board and treasurer	Sweden
390	2024	Guillaume V, Grand Duke of Luxembourg	World Scout Foundation board	Luxembourg
391	2024	Mohammed Ali Khalid	WOSM Asia-Pacific region committee	India
392	2024	Saâd Zian	WOSM bureau adults in Scouting and volunteer development director Scouts Musulmans de France, Scouts et Guides de France Eclaireuses Eclaireurs de France	France and Morocco
393	2024	Héctor Robledo Cervantes	World Scout Foundation chairman	Mexico
394	2024	Yelena Luzyanina	Eurasian region committee chairperson	Kazakhstan
395	2024	Armando Aguirre	WOSM inter-American region committee vice-chairperson	United States
396	2024	Jim Kastelic	WOSM consultant and Africa region youth programme director	Namibia
397	2024	Maggie Blick Kigozi	Africa Scout Foundation chairperson	Uganda
398	2024	Leonardo Morales	WOSM committee and inter-American region committee chairperson	Costa Rica
399	2024	Gill Clay	Robert Baden-Powell's granddaughter, national and international leader	United Kingdom
400	2025	Ahmad Alhendawi	WOSM Secretary General	Jordan
401	2025	Christos Hatzidiamandis	WOSM European Scout region committee vice-chairperson	Greece
402	2025	Andy Chapman	Former WOSM committee chairman	USA
403	2025	Ie Bin Lian	WOSM consultant	Taiwan, China
404	2025	Wayne Davis	Africa Scout Committee, World Scout Committee	Ethiopia, United States of America
405	2025	David McKee	Former European Region Chairperson, World Scout Bureau	United Kingdom
406	2025	Mohamed Mostafa	WOSM consultant	Egypt
407	2025	Sarah Rita Kattan	WOSM committee vice-chair	Lebanon
408	2026	Mehdi Ben Khelil	WOSM Committee	Tunisia
	2026	Jo Deman	WOSM Committee	Belgium

Among the recipients have been heads of state such as Hamengkubuwono IX, Vice President of Indonesia, Carl XVI Gustaf of Sweden, Jean, Grand Duke of Luxembourg, Bhumibol Adulyadej and Philippine president Fidel V. Ramos.
