= Scouting and Guiding in Rwanda =

Scouting and Guiding associations in Rwanda

The Scout and Guide movement in Rwanda is served by two organisations:

- Association des Guides du Rwanda, member of the World Association of Girl Guides and Girl Scouts
- Rwanda Scouts Association, member of the World Organization of the Scout Movement
