= Jan Volkmaars =

Chief Commissioner of De Nederlandse Padvinders

Evert Jan Hendrikus Volkmaars (5 July 1902 – 1997) served as the Chief Commissioner of De Nederlandse Padvinders (NPV), as well as a member of the World Scout Committee.

At the World Scout Conference from 26 to 29 September 1962, Volkmaars proposed the adoption of the World Scout Emblem for all movements. J. S. Wilson introduced an international Scout badge in 1939-a silver fleur-de-lis on a purple background surrounded by the names of the five continents in silver within a circular frame. The current emblem design was introduced at the 8th World Scout Jamboree in 1955 by former Boy Scouts of Greece National Commissioner Demetrios Alexatos. The wearing of it was not universal, but was confined to past and present members of the International Committee and staff of the Bureau. A flag of similar design followed, the flying of which was restricted to international Scout gatherings. After long discussions, the 27th World Scout Conference in 1969 adopted them as the emblem and flag of all movements, based on Volkmaars' 1962 proposal.

In 1965, Volkmaars was awarded the 38th Bronze Wolf, the only distinction of the World Organization of the Scout Movement, awarded by the World Scout Committee for exceptional services to world Scouting.
