= Teiji Takemiya =

- 竹宮 帝次

Deputy International Commissioner of the Scout Association of Japan

Teiji Takemiya (竹宮 帝次, Takemiya Teiji) (Los Angeles 1923-) was a nisei Japanese American served as the Deputy International Commissioner of the Scout Association of Japan, a member of the National Board of Trustees, and a member of the Asia-Pacific Scout Committee.

He attended the signing ceremony of the official Japanese surrender of World War II on board the USS Missouri (BB-63) in 1945.

In 1998, Takemiya was awarded the 268th Bronze Wolf, the only distinction of the World Organization of the Scout Movement, awarded by the World Scout Committee for exceptional services to world Scouting.
