= Anthony Thng =

Chairman of the Asia-Pacific Scout Region
- In office 2001–2004

Anthony Thng Bock Boh served as the Chairman of the Asia-Pacific Scout Region from 2001 to 2004, as well as International Commissioner of the Singapore Scout Association.

In 2005, he was awarded the 307th Bronze Wolf, the only distinction of the World Organization of the Scout Movement, awarded by the World Scout Committee for exceptional services to world Scouting.
