= Luc M. Lacroix =

Rev. Père Luc M. Lacroix
- Treasurer of the Association des Scouts du Rwanda

Personal details
- Born: 1909
- Died: 1991 (aged 81–82)
- Denomination: Catholic

Rev. Père Luc Marie Lacroix of Canada (1909–1991) was a Dominican Catholic priest who served as the Treasurer of the Association des Scouts du Rwanda.

Lacroix was a publisher and author of books on Scouting for the Association des Scouts du Canada, of which he was the curator.

In 1983, he was awarded the 163rd Bronze Wolf, the only distinction of the World Organization of the Scout Movement, awarded by the World Scout Committee for exceptional services to world Scouting, on the occasion of the 15th World Scout Jamboree.
