= Sumon Samasarn =

Thai educator

- สุมน สมสาร
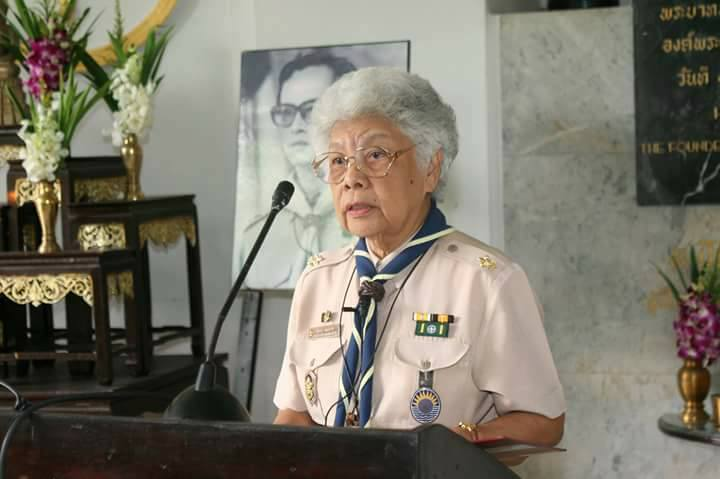
- Sumon Samasarn, during her active years

National Training Commissioner of the National Scout Organization of Thailand

Sumon Samasarn (Thai: สุมน สมสาร, pronounced [sù.mōn sa.ma.sǎːn], 16 April 1927 – 4 September 2017) was a Thai teacher and an influential contributor to the Scouting movement in Thailand. She worked as a career civil servant under the Ministry of Education until her retirement, was a member of the 1989 Senate and 1991 National Legislative Assembly, and served as the National Training Commissioner of the National Scout Organization of Thailand. Samasarn was the sister of Thailand's former prime minister Chavalit Yongchaiyudh.

In 1997, Samasarn was awarded the 261st Bronze Wolf, the only distinction of the World Organization of the Scout Movement, awarded by the World Scout Committee for exceptional services to world Scouting. Apart from that, Samasarn also received Asia-Pacific Region Chairman’s Award and Asia-Pacific Regional For Distinguished Service Award, given by Asia-Pacific Regional Scout Committee.

In August 2017, Samasarn was admitted to Phramongkutklao Hospital and died on 4 September 2017 at the age of 90. Paul D. Parkinson, Chairman of Asia-Pacific Regional Scout Committee, and J. Rizal C. Pangilinan, Regional Director of World Scout Bureau/Asia-Pacific Support Centre, sent out an official letter to recognize her death and hail her "a wonderful person and had always been a great asset to the Scout Movement."

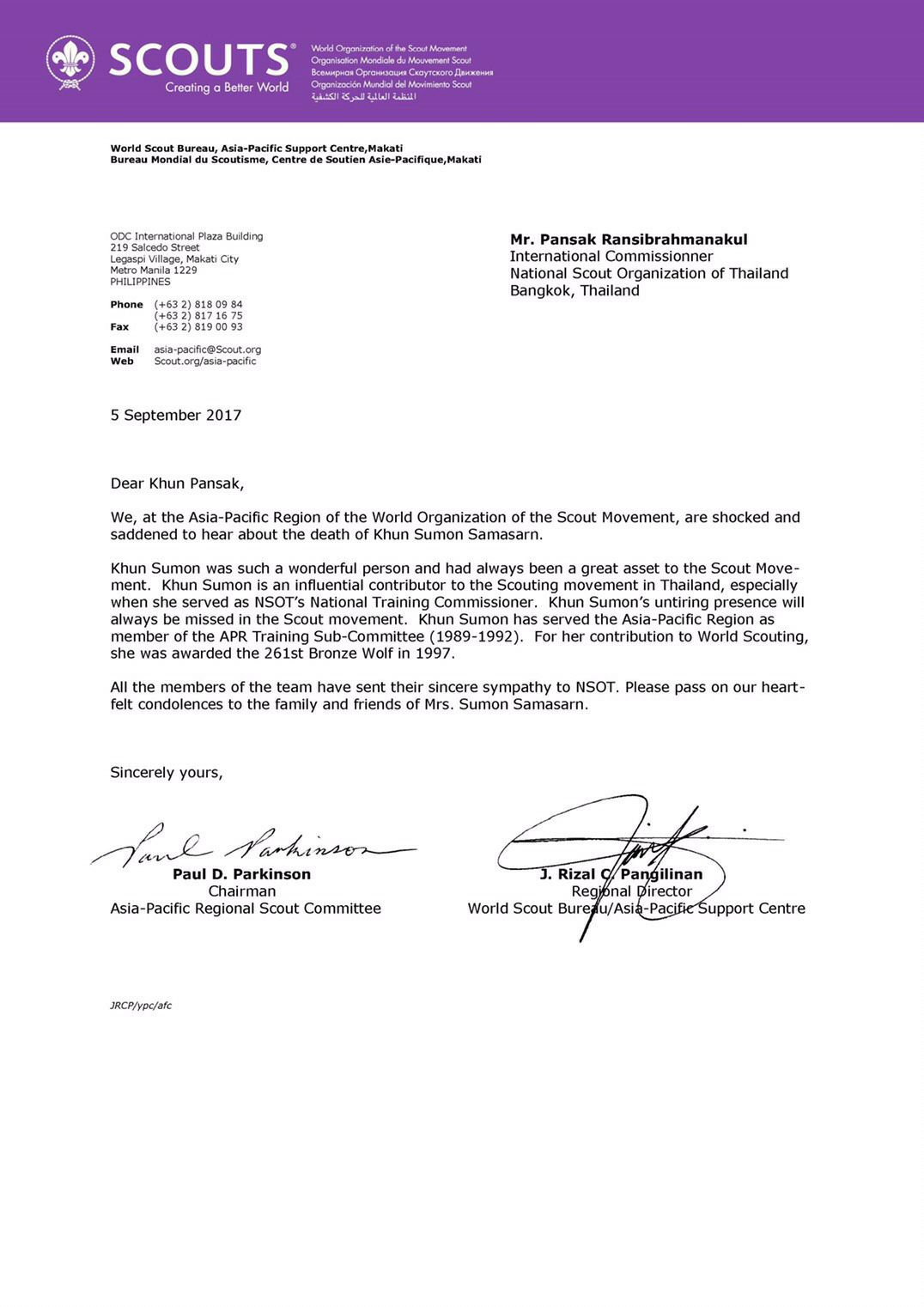
A letter from Paul D. Parkinson, Chairman of Asia-Pacific Regional Scout Committee, regretting after the death of Samasarn.

The royal cremation of Samasarn was on 11 September 2017 at Wat Somanat Wihan with hundreds of mourners attending.
