= Victor Brenes =

Costa Rican politician and scout

Minister of Education of Costa Rica
- In office ?

Personal details
- Awards: Bronze Wolf

Victor Brenes, the Minister of Education of Costa Rica, served as a member of the National Council of the Asociación de Guías y Scouts de Costa Rica. In 1988, Brenes was awarded the 199th Bronze Wolf, the only distinction of the World Organization of the Scout Movement, awarded by the World Scout Committee for exceptional services to world Scouting.
