= John Beng Kiat Liem =

- Born: May 17, 1922; Bukittinggi, Indonesia
- Died: June 26, 2001 (aged 79); Jakarta
- Other names: Jan (dutch ver. Of John)
- Known for: Member of the Asia-Pacific Scout Committee
- Spouse: Ansje
- Children: 8

John Beng Kiat Liem (May 17, 1922 in Bukittinggi, Indonesia – June 26, 2001 in Jakarta) served as a member of the Asia-Pacific Scout Committee. In 1982, he was awarded the 158th Bronze Wolf, the only distinction of the World Organization of the Scout Movement, awarded by the World Scout Committee for exceptional services to world Scouting. He also being awarded Bintang Jasa Pratama by President of Indonesia for his contribution in Indonesian Scout movement in 1995.
