= Leonardo Morales Morales =

Costa Rican scout leader

Leonardo Morales

Regional Chair of the Interamerican Regional Scout Committee of the World Organization of the Scout Movement

Leonardo Morales Morales from Hatillo, San José, Costa Rica is the outgoing Regional Chair of the Interamerican Regional Scout Committee of the World Organization of the Scout Movement (WOSM). as well as a member of the International Catholic Conference of Scouting.

Morales is the Executive Director at VIDA Volunteering and Environmental Organization in San José, Costa Rica, and previously worked for the Asociación de Guías y Scouts de Costa Rica and studied at COVOMOSA in Desamparados. He is married and lives in San Rafael de Heredia.

In 2024, the World Scout Committee recognized Morales with the Bronze Wolf Award.
