= Francisco S. Román =

Chairman of the World Scout Committee

Francisco S. "Frankie" Roman (1930–2016) served as the Chairman of the World Scout Committee from 1996 to 1999, President of the Boy Scouts of the Philippines from 1986 to 1989, and as Chairman of the Asia-Pacific Scout Committee.

In 1992, he was awarded the 219th Bronze Wolf, the only distinction of the World Organization of the Scout Movement, awarded by the World Scout Committee for exceptional services to world Scouting, at the 25th World Scout Conference.
