= Guillermo R. Padolina =

Filipino Scouting leader

National Scout Director of the Boy Scouts of the Philippines
- In office 1954–1956

Guillermo R. Padolina served as the National Scout Director of the Boy Scouts of the Philippines from 1954 to 1956, as well as the Regional Executive Commissioner of the Far East Scout Region of the World Scout Bureau.

In 1967, he was awarded the 46th Bronze Wolf, the only distinction of the World Organization of the Scout Movement, awarded by the World Scout Committee for exceptional services to world Scouting, at the 25th World Scout Conference.
