= William George Wells =

Australian Chief Scout (1939–2021)

- Born: 4 December 1939
- Died: 4 February 2021 (aged 81)
- Occupation: Paediatric proctologist

William George Wells AM (4 December 1939 – 4 February 2021) was The Scout Association of Australia chief commissioner from 1992 to 1999 and, in 2008, chairman of its Queen's Scout association.

Wells played a role in the Asia-Pacific Scout Region. In 1988, he organized the World Organization of the Scout Movement 31st conference in Melbourne. In 2002, The World Organization of the Scout Movement awarded Wells its 294th Bronze Wolf for exceptional services to world Scouting.

Wells died on 4 February 2021, at the age of 81.
