= Sutham Phanthusak =

Thai businessman

- Born: August 28, 1947.
- Died: May 18, 2016 (aged 68)
- Occupation: Businessman
- Known for: Early contributor to the development of Pattaya

Sutham Phanthusak (Thai: สุธรรม พันธุศักดิ์, pronounced [sù.tʰām pʰān.tʰú.sàk]; 28 August 1947 – 18 May 2016) was a Thai businessman. He was an early contributor to the development of Pattaya, where he established the transgender cabaret Tiffany's Show and the Woodlands Hotel & Resort.

He served as the Public Relations Commissioner and a member of the National Scout Council of the National Scout Organization of Thailand, as well as Vice-Chairman of the Asia-Pacific Regional Scout Committee.

He was appointed to the 2011 Senate and the 2014 National Legislative Assembly.

In 1998, Phanthusak was awarded the 266th Bronze Wolf, the only distinction of the World Organization of the Scout Movement, awarded by the World Scout Committee for exceptional services to world Scouting.
