= Shree Ram Lamichhane =

- श्री राम लामिछाने

Chief Commissioner of Nepal Scouts

Shree Ram Lamichhanne (Nepali: श्री राम लामिछाने, February 21) from Lalitpur, Nepal, served as the Chief Commissioner of Nepal Scouts and as the Regional Vice-Chairman of the Asia-Pacific Regional Scout Committee of the World Organization of the Scout Movement (WOSM), and as an elected volunteer member from 2009 to 2015, presently serving as Chairman of the Awards Committee.

He studied at University of Canberra and Tribhuvan University.

In 2016, he was awarded the 350th Bronze Wolf, the only distinction of the World Organization of the Scout Movement, awarded by the World Scout Committee for exceptional services to world Scouting.
