= Kim Kyu-young =

- Born: 1937
- Known for: Regional Director of the Asia-Pacific Region of the World Scout Bureau

Korean name
- Hangul: 김규영
- Hanja: 金奎泳
- RR: Gim Gyuyeong
- MR: Kim Kyuyŏng

Art name
- Hangul: 수암
- RR: Suam
- MR: Suam

Kim Kyu-young (Korean: 김규영; 1937 – 25 November 2015) served as the director of the Korea Scout Association from 1982 to 1991 and Regional Director of the Asia-Pacific Region of the World Scout Bureau from 1990 to 2002.

In 2002, Kim was awarded the 291st Bronze Wolf, the only distinction of the World Organization of the Scout Movement, awarded by the World Scout Committee for exceptional services to world Scouting.

He was eulogized by Scott Teare, WOSM Secretary General.
