= Sibomana =

Sibomana is a surname. Notable people with the surname include:

- Abdul Sibomana (born 1981), Rwandan footballer
- Abouba Sibomana (born 1989), Rwandan footballer
- Adrien Sibomana (born 1953), Burundian politician
- André Sibomana (1954–1998), Rwandan priest
- Patrick Sibomana (born 1996), Rwandan footballer
- René Sibomana, Rwandan scout
