= Kuno =

Kuno or KUNO may refer to:

== Broadcasting ==
- KUNO (AM), a radio station (1400 AM) licensed to Corpus Christi, Texas, United States
- KUNO-TV, the former call letters of current television station, KQSL (channel 8) licensed to Fort Bragg, California, United States

== Places ==
- Kuno Peak in British Columbia, Canada
- Kuno Wildlife Sanctuary in Madhya Pradesh, India

== Electronics ==
- KUNO branded Android tablets made for the education market.

== People ==
Given name

- Kuno (given name)
- Kuno II von Falkenstein (1320–1388), German nobleman
- Kuno von Stoffeln (before 1365–1411), Prince abbot of Saint Gall
- Kuno Fischer (1824–1907), German philosophy professor
- Kuno von Klebelsberg (1875–1932), Hungarian politician
- Kuno Francke (1855–1930), German-American historian
- Kuno Gonschior (1933–2010), German painter
- Kuno von Moltke (1847–1923), German Lieutenant General
- Kuno Meyer (1858–1919), Celtic language scholar
- Kuno von Westarp (1864–1945), German conservative politician
- Kuno H. Struck (1883–1947), American medical doctor and bank executive
- Kuno Hans von Both (1884–1955), German Army General in WWII
- Kuno Veeber (1898–1929), Estonian painter and graphic artist
- Kuno von Eltz-Rübenach (1904–1945), German Nazi politician
- Kuno Klötzer (1922–2011), German professional soccer player
- Kuno Pajula (1924–2012), Estonian Archbishop of Tallinn in the Estonian Evangelical Lutheran Church
- Kuno Lorenz (1932- ), German philosopher
- Kuno Raude (1941- ), Estonian architect and politician
- Kuno Fencker (born 1974), Greenlandic politician
- Kuno Becker (1978- ), Mexican actor and film director
- Kuno Wittmer (born 1982), Canadian race car driver

Surname

- Ayaka Kuno (born 1987), Japanese sprint canoer
- Edo Udgoon Siyad Kuno, Kenyan politician
- Hisashi Kuno (1910–1969), Japanese geologist
- Junya Kuno (born 1988), Japanese football player
- Katsura Kuno, Japanese Scout official
- Makiko Kuno (born 1967), Japanese actress
- Misaki Kuno (born 1993), Japanese actress and voice actress
- Seiichi Kuno (1887–1962), Japanese military commander
- Susumu Kuno (born 1933), Japanese linguist
- Tomoaki Kuno (born 1973), Japanese football player

Nickname

- Claus 'Kuno' Christiansen

See also

- Der kleine Kuno, East German film from 1959

== Fictional characters ==
- Yoko Kuno from All About Lily Chou-Chou
- from Ranma ½ (Kuno (九能, Kunō)):
  - Tatewaki Kuno
  - Kodachi Kuno
  - Principal Kuno
- Kuno from "The Machine Stops", by E.M.Forster
- Kuno from In the Congo, by Urs Widmer

== Other ==
- Kuno (dog) a recipient of the Dickin Medal
