= Ranga Rao =

Ranga Rao or Rangarao (Telugu: రంగారావు) is an Indian name.

It may also refer to:

- M. Ranga Rao, Indian musician and composer
- Goddanti Ranga Rao
- Ramakrishna Ranga Rao of Bobbili, Indian politician and zamindar who served as the Chief Minister of Madras Presidency
- Ravichettu Ranga Rao, Telugu writer of Andhra Pradesh
- Sakshi Ranga Rao, Telugu film actor and writer
- S. V. Ranga Rao or Samarla Venkata Ranga Rao, South Indian actor, director and producer
- Venkata Ranga Rao, Indian landlord and zamindar of Bobbili
- V. K. R. V. Rao or Vijendra Kasturi Ranga Varadaraja Rao, Indian economist, politician and educator
- NR Group, Indian incense company, owner of the Cycle brand
