= Ghunaim =

Ghunaim may refer to:

- Zuhair Ghunaim
- Zakaria Goneim
