= Kuhnke =

Kuhnke is a surname. Notable people with the name include:

- Alice Bah Kuhnke (born 1971), Swedish Minister of Culture and Democracy
- Christian Kuhnke (born 1939), German tennis player
- Günter Kuhnke (1912–1990), German Konteradmiral
- Johannes Bah Kuhnke (born 1972), Swedish actor and singer
- Kurt Kuhnke (1910–1969), German racing drivers
- Wolf Kuhnke, President of the Ring deutscher Pfadfinderverbä
- William Kane Kuhnke (born 1950), Canadian hydrologist and genealogy expert.
