= Hosch =

Hosch is a surname. Notable people with the surname include:

- Finn Hösch (born 2003), German ski mountaineer
- Julie Hosch (born 1939), American politician
- Larry Hosch (born 1977), American politician
- Nicolas Hosch
- Tanya Hosch, Australian activist
- Vincent Hösch (born 1957), German sailor
- Vivian Hösch (born 1991), visually impaired German biathlete and cross-country skier

== See also ==
- Cyril Höschl (1949–2025), Czech psychiatrist and academic
