= Gilberth González =

Executive Director and Member of the Board of the Interamerican Scout Foundation

Gilberth González U. served as the executive director and member of the board of the Interamerican Scout Foundation, executive director of the Asociación de Guías y Scouts de Costa Rica, and director of operations of the Interamerican Scout Office. In 1997, Gonzalez was awarded the 258th Bronze Wolf, the only distinction of the World Organization of the Scout Movement, awarded by the World Scout Committee for exceptional services to world Scouting.
