= Mari Nakano =

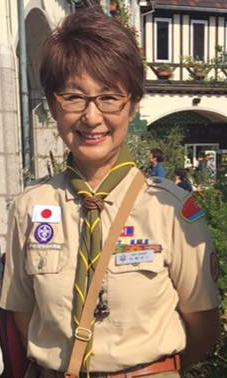
- Occupations: Independent translation and localization professional
- Known for: One of 12 elected volunteer members of the World Scout Committee

Mari Nakano (中野 まり, Nakano Mari; born February 18) of Japan is one of 12 elected volunteer members of the World Scout Committee, the main executive body of the World Organization of the Scout Movement. Nakano is the first woman to represent the Asia-Pacific Scout Region on the governing body. She served as the World Jamboree Organizing Committee Chairman, and was elected to the World Scout Committee at the 39th World Scout Conference in Brazil in January 2011 and was re-elected at the 40th World Scout Conference in Ljubljana, Slovenia in 2014. She served as the chairperson of the Jamboree management team for the 23rd World Scout Jamboree up to 2015.

Nakano, who is married with a son and a daughter, finished postgraduate study at Kobe University in human development, and is an independent translation and localization professional. She has been involved with the Scout Association of Japan since 1996.

In 2017, Nakano was awarded the 362nd Bronze Wolf, the only distinction of the World Organization of the Scout Movement, awarded by the World Scout Committee for exceptional services to world Scouting.
