= Jorge Maria Cui =

Secretary General

Secretary General of the Boy Scouts of the Philippines
- In office 1975–1980

Jorge Maria Cui served as the Secretary General of the Boy Scouts of the Philippines from 1975 to 1980, and as a member of the Asia-Pacific Scout Committee.

In 1979, he was awarded the 134th Bronze Wolf, the only distinction of the World Organization of the Scout Movement, awarded by the World Scout Committee for exceptional services to world Scouting, at the 25th World Scout Conference.
