= Marc Lombard =

Scouting Director

Director of the Kandersteg International Scout Centre

Marc Lombard from Thun, Switzerland (born March 9) was the Director of the Kandersteg International Scout Centre and the Chairman of the Kandersteg International Scout Centre Foundation.

In 2016, Lombard was awarded the 349th Bronze Wolf, the only distinction of the World Organization of the Scout Movement, awarded by the World Scout Committee for exceptional services to world Scouting.

Lombard studied Sport Management at the University of Fribourg, is the chief executive officer at "Bildungswerkstatt Bergwald" educational institution, and lives in Belp, Switzerland.
