= Mohamed Saad El Din Sherif =

- محمد سعد الدين شريف
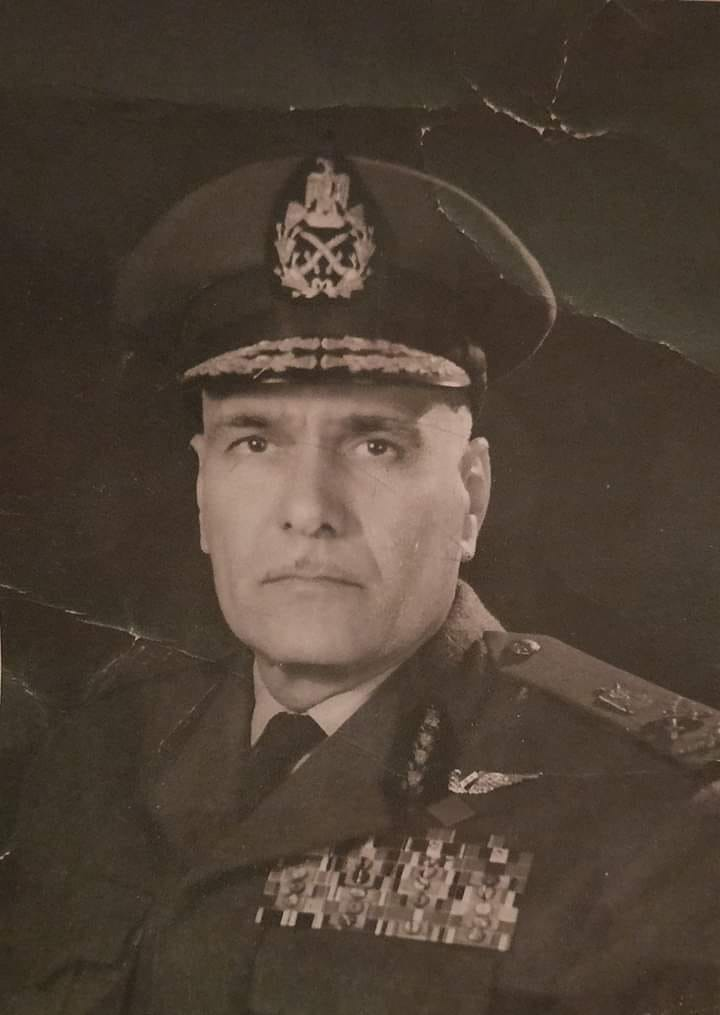
- Mohamed Saad el Din Sherif
- Died: 1997
- Military career
- Allegiance: Egyptian
- Rank: General
- Commands: Aliawran squadron
- Awards: Bronze Wolf
- Other work: Chairman of the Arab Scout Parliamentary Union

General Mohamed Saad El Din Sherif (Egyptian Arabic: محمد سعد الدين شريف d. 1997) served as the commander of the Aliawran squadron during the administration of Gamal Abdel Nasser and Anwar Sadat, served as Senior Aviation Advisor to the President, and took over the presidency of the People's Assembly immediately after the assassination of Dr. Rifaat el-Mahgoub.

He served as the Chairman of the Arab Scout Parliamentary Union, as well as the President of the Arab Region of the International Fellowship of Former Scouts and Guides. In 1996, he was awarded the 254th Bronze Wolf, the only distinction of the World Organization of the Scout Movement, awarded by the World Scout Committee for exceptional services to world Scouting.

He died in 1997 and was given a formal military funeral attended by senior state officials.
