= Ali Ali El Morsi =

International Commissioner and Vice-President of the Egyptian Scout Federation

- علي علي المرسي

International Commissioner and Vice-President of the Egyptian Scout Federation

Ali Ali El Morsi (Egyptian Arabic: علي علي المرسي) served as the International Commissioner and Vice-President of the Egyptian Scout Federation.

In 2002, he was awarded the 290th Bronze Wolf, the only distinction of the World Organization of the Scout Movement, awarded by the World Scout Committee for exceptional services to world Scouting.
