= Geoffrey W. Wheatley =

Geoffrey W. Wheatley of Canada was the chairman of the Interamerican Scout Committee. In 1998, he was awarded the 269th Bronze Wolf, the only distinction of the World Organization of the Scout Movement, awarded by the World Scout Committee for exceptional services to world scouting.
