= Chen Chung-shin =

- Known for: General Secretary of the Boy Scouts of China

Chung-shin Chen (Chinese: 陳忠信; pinyin: Chén Zhōngxìn) served as the General Secretary of the Boy Scouts of China. In 1982, Chen was awarded the 157th Bronze Wolf, the only distinction of the World Organization of the Scout Movement, awarded by the World Scout Committee for exceptional services to world Scouting.
