= Mohamed Afilal =

- محمد أفيلال

Chairman of the Arab Scout Committee
- In office 2004–2007

Mohamed Afilal (Arabic: محمد أفيلال; Berber languages: ⵎⵓⵀⴰⵎⴷ ⴰⴼⵉⵍⴰⵍ) served as Chairman of the Arab Scout Committee from 2004 to 2007, as well as General Commissioner of the Fédération Nationale du Scoutisme Marocain in 2005.

In 2005, he was awarded the 304th Bronze Wolf, the only distinction of the World Organization of the Scout Movement, awarded by the World Scout Committee for exceptional services to world Scouting.
