= Henning Mysager =

Dr. Henning Mysager

Mayor of Brovst municipality, Denmark
- In office 1986–1998

Dr. Henning Mysager, mayor of Brovst municipality, Denmark representing Venstre from 1986 to 1998, served as the Vice-Chairman of the World Scout Committee.

In 1983, Mysager was awarded the 168th Bronze Wolf, the only distinction of the World Organization of the Scout Movement, awarded by the World Scout Committee for exceptional services to world Scouting.
