= Abdoulaye Sar =

Director of Community Development of the World Scout Bureau

Abdoulaye Sar served as the Director of Community Development of the World Scout Bureau.

In 1997, he was awarded the 262nd Bronze Wolf, the only distinction of the World Organization of the Scout Movement, awarded by the World Scout Committee for exceptional services to world Scouting.
