= Abdullah Rasheed =

Regional Director of the Asia-Pacific Region of the World Scout Bureau

Abdullah Rasheed (1952) (Arabic: عبد الله رشيد) from Male, Maldives served as the Regional Director of the Asia-Pacific Region of the World Scout Bureau, and serves as a Consultant at World Scout Bureau Kuala Lumpur Office.

Rasheed is a member of the ISGF regional board for Asia Pacific region.

Rasheed attended Majeediyya School, where he joined the Sea Scouts at the end of the 1960s. He served as the Chief Commissioner of the Scout Association of Maldives between 1994 and 1997.

In 2013, Rasheed was awarded the 341st Bronze Wolf, the only distinction of the World Organization of the Scout Movement, awarded by the World Scout Committee for exceptional services to world Scouting.
