= Robert Wilmes =

French Scout leader (1928–2018)

World Organization of the Scout Movement representative to the UNESCO Non-Governmental Organization Committee

Robert "Bob" Wilmes (1928 – 7 November 2018) from Troyes, France (Scout name "Loup Hurleur", meaning "Howling Wolf") served as the volunteer World Organization of the Scout Movement representative to the UNESCO Non-Governmental Organization Committee.

Wilmes joined Scouting very young, as his father Pierre (Scout name "Loup Solitaire", meaning "Lone Wolf") and his mother Marie (Scout name "Mère Louve", meaning "Mother Wolf") were both leaders in the Éclaireuses et Éclaireurs de France.

Wilmes led Saint-Jean-de-Bonneval EEDF Group in Troyes from 1945. Since 1948, his group has developed international Scout exchanges with WOSM partners in Central Europe, Scandinavia and the Balkans, and was elected as a Regional Scout Manager. Wilmes' double French and Quebecois culture has aided in Scouting exchanges for Fédération québécoise du guidisme et du scoutisme groups traveling to France and French groups traveling to Canada, since 1987.

In 2001, Wilmes was awarded the 287th Bronze Wolf, the only distinction of the WOSM, awarded by the World Scout Committee for exceptional services to world Scouting.

Wilmes worked as a sports caricaturist for Aube's daily newspaper, Libération Champagne.
