= Fernando Soto-Hay y García =

Mexican scouting leader

- Known for: Member of the National Court of Honor of the Asociación de Scouts de México, Asociación Civil

Fernando Soto-Hay y Garcia served as a member of the National Court of Honor of the Asociación de Scouts de México, Asociación Civil, as well as the Chairman of the Interamerican Scout Training Commission.

In 1995, he was awarded the 244th Bronze Wolf, the only distinction of the World Organization of the Scout Movement, awarded by the World Scout Committee for exceptional services to world Scouting.
