= John Neysmith =

Canadian scouting leader

- Known for: One of 12 elected volunteer members of the World Scout Committee

John Neysmith(1942) of Canada was one of 12 elected volunteer members of the World Scout Committee, the main executive body of the World Organization of the Scout Movement, and the former International Commissioner for Scouts Canada. Through his involvement with the World Bureau, he has had the opportunity to travel and observe Scouts Canada's Brotherhood Fund contributions at work. Under his direction, the Scouts Canada Brotherhood Fund raised money to buy a cow for a Street Scout group in Nairobi, and bought and installed computer systems for training Scouters in ten Southern African countries. In his capacities, he has travelled to Indonesia and Uganda, where he has worked with Extension Scouts (previously known as the Street Scouts program, active in Kenya, eastern Uganda and northern Tanzania).

In 2016, he was awarded the 352nd Bronze Wolf, the only distinction of the World Organization of the Scout Movement, awarded by the World Scout Committee for exceptional services to world Scouting.
