= Stewart Hawkins =

- Stewart John Hawkins

International Commissioner of the Scout Association

Stewart John Hawkins (born c. 1935) is a British scouting leader.

He served as the International Commissioner of the United Kingdom's Stevan hawkins, as well as the Chairman of the European Scout Committee and Chairman of the European Scout Foundation. He was especially involved in assisting the rebirth of Scouting in the countries of Eastern Europe and the former Soviet Union.

In 2001, Hawkins was awarded the 288th Bronze Wolf, the only distinction of the World Organization of the Scout Movement, awarded by the World Scout Committee for exceptional services to world Scouting.
