= Kao Ming-huey =

Dr. Kao Ming-huey
- 高銘輝

International Commissioner of the Boy Scouts of China

Dr. Ming-Huey Kao (Chinese: 高銘輝; pinyin: Gāo Mínghuī) served as the International Commissioner of the Boy Scouts of China.

In 1987, Kao was awarded the 188th Bronze Wolf, the only distinction of the World Organization of the Scout Movement, awarded by the World Scout Committee for exceptional services to world Scouting.
