= Nicos Kalogeras =

Chief Commissioner of the Scouts of Greece

- Νίκος Καλογεράς

Chief Commissioner of the Scouts of Greece

Nicos Kalogeras (Greek: Νίκος Καλογεράς) served as the Chief Commissioner of the Scouts of Greece, served as the Chairman of the Kandersteg International Scout Centre Committee, and as a member of the European Scout Committee.

In 1992, Kalogeras was awarded the 217th Bronze Wolf, the only distinction of the World Organization of the Scout Movement, awarded by the World Scout Committee for exceptional services to world Scouting.
