= Paula Peláez =

Chilean scouting leader

President of the Asociación de Guías y Scouts de Chile

Paula Peláez G. served as the President of the Asociación de Guías y Scouts de Chile. In 2000, Peláez was awarded the 285th Bronze Wolf, the only distinction of the World Organization of the Scout Movement, awarded by the World Scout Committee for exceptional services to world Scouting.
