= Jerry Voros =

Chairman of the International Committee of the Boy Scouts of America

Gerald J. Voros (May 13, 1930 – February 4, 2019) served as the Chairman of the International Committee of the Boy Scouts of America.

Voros took part in four world jamborees and was head of the American delegation at the 1995 18th World Scout Jamboree in the Netherlands. He served as a member of the Inter-American Scout Foundation for six years and chaired the group responsible for the reception of the Baden-Powell Companions in New York City in 2002.

A Korean War veteran and an ex-Marine, Voros started his career in journalism and public relations, joining the Pittsburgh public relations agency Ketchum Communications in 1966 after leaving advertising agency N.W. Ayers in Chicago. In 1982 he was promoted from the head of the public relations unit to the president of Ketchum from 1983 until he retired in 1992. In 1983 he co-edited the book What Happens in Public Relations with Paul H. Alvarez. Involved in local politics as a supporter of the Democratic Party, he was campaign chair for Tom Murphy in 1993 leading to Murphy's election as Mayor of the City of Pittsburgh. Voros served as the chairman of the World Affairs Council of Pittsburgh (1988-1989), on the Development and Marketing Committee for the Extra Mile Education Foundation, and on the Board of Directors for the Pittsburgh Parks Conservancy.

In 2005, Voros was awarded the 308th Bronze Wolf, the only distinction of the World Organization of the Scout Movement, awarded by the World Scout Committee for exceptional services to world Scouting. He also received the Silver Buffalo Award in 1992.

Voros died on February 4, 2019, at the age of 88.
