= Paul König (Scouting) =

Dr. Paul König

International Commissioner of the Ring deutscher Pfadfinderverbände

Dr. Paul König served as the International Commissioner of the Ring deutscher Pfadfinderverbände and led the German contingent to the 9th World Scout Jamboree.

In 1974, König was awarded the 88th Bronze Wolf, the only distinction of the World Organization of the Scout Movement, awarded by the World Scout Committee for exceptional services to world Scouting.
