= John Cook Parish =

American scout

International Commissioner of the Boy Scouts of America

John Cook Parish (-‡ 2005 to 2008) was an International Commissioner of the Boy Scouts of America and elected as such to the World Scout Committee. At the 64th annual meeting of the BSA in May 1974, he was re-elected to the post and elected vice-president of the association.

Parish reached the rank of Eagle Scout in 1926, and was awarded the Distinguished Eagle Scout Award.

Parish was awarded the Bronze Wolf, the only distinction of the World Organization of the Scout Movement, awarded by the World Scout Committee for exceptional services to world Scouting. He was also a 1962 recipient of the Silver Buffalo Award.
