= Jack McCracken (Scouting) =

- Known for: Member of the International Relations Committee of Scouts Canada

Jack McCracken served as a member of the International Relations Committee of Scouts Canada. In 1999, McCracken was awarded the 276th Bronze Wolf, the only distinction of the World Organization of the Scout Movement, awarded by the World Scout Committee for exceptional services to world Scouting.
