= Tassos Sagos =

International Commissioner of the Scouts of Greece

- Αναστάσιος Σάγος

International Commissioner of the Scouts of Greece

Anastassios "Tassos" Sagos Greek: Αναστάσιος Σάγος (-‡2002 to 2005) served as the International Commissioner of the Scouts of Greece.

In 1993, Sagos was awarded the 229th Bronze Wolf, the only distinction of the World Organization of the Scout Movement, awarded by the World Scout Committee for exceptional services to world Scouting.
