= Hussein Sabry Gad El Mula =

Egyptian scouting leader

- حسين صبري جاد المولى

Treasurer of the Arab Scout Region

Hussein Sabry Gad El Mula (Egyptian Arabic: حسين صبري جاد المولى) served as the Treasurer of the Arab Scout Region.

In 1990, he was awarded the 213th Bronze Wolf, the only distinction of the World Organization of the Scout Movement, awarded by the World Scout Committee for exceptional services to world Scouting.
