= Mohamed H. Fhema =

Dr. Mohamed H. Fhema
- محمد حسونة فحيمة
- Chairman of the Arab Scout Committee

Dr. Mohamed Hassouna Fhema (Arabic: محمد حسونة فحيمة; Berber languages: ⵎⵓⵃⵎⴷ ⵃⵙⵓⵏⴰ ⴼⵃⵉⵎⴰ d. 2008) served as Chairman of the Arab Scout Committee.

In 1983, he was awarded the 166th Bronze Wolf, the only distinction of the World Organization of the Scout Movement, awarded by the World Scout Committee for exceptional services to world Scouting.
