= Costas Constantinou =

- Κώστας Κωνσταντίνου

Chief Commissioner of the Cyprus Scouts Association

Costas Constantinou (Greek: Κώστας Κωνσταντίνου) served as the Chief Commissioner of the Cyprus Scouts Association.

== Background ==
In 1994, Constantinou was awarded the 233rd Bronze Wolf, the only distinction of the World Organization of the Scout Movement, awarded by the World Scout Committee for exceptional services to world Scouting.
