= Kim Yong-wan =

- Born: March 4, 1927
- Died: February 21, 2008 (aged 80)
- Known for: Vice-President of the Boy Scouts of Korea

Korean name
- Hangul: 김용완
- Hanja: 金容完
- RR: Gim Yongwan
- MR: Kim Yongwan

Kim Yong-wan (Korean: 김용완; March 4, 1927 – February 21, 2008) served as the Vice-President of the Boy Scouts of Korea.

In 1993, Kim was awarded the 225th Bronze Wolf, the only distinction of the World Organization of the Scout Movement, awarded by the World Scout Committee for exceptional services to world Scouting.
