= Arthur Eugster (Scouting) =

Scouting committee member

Regional Treasurer of the European Regional Scout Committee

Arthur Eugster of Switzerland served as the Regional Treasurer of the European Regional Scout Committee.

In 1975, Eugster was awarded the 98th Bronze Wolf, the only distinction of the World Organization of the Scout Movement, awarded by the World Scout Committee for exceptional services to world Scouting, at the 25th World Scout Conference.
