= Jack Sinclair (Scouting) =

Canadian scout

President and International Commissioner of Scouts Canada

Jack Sinclair served as the President and International Commissioner of Scouts Canada. In 2004, Sinclair was awarded the 302nd Bronze Wolf, the only distinction of the World Organization of the Scout Movement, awarded by the World Scout Committee for exceptional services to world Scouting.
