= Léonard Offoumou Yapo =

Chairman of the Africa Scout Committee

Léonard Offoumou Yapo (Attobrou 1923 – Paris, 5 December 2006) was an Ivorian politician who served as the chairman of the Africa Scout Committee and president of the Africa Scout Foundation until 2003; awarded the 298th Bronze Wolf, the only distinction of the World Organization of the Scout Movement, awarded by the World Scout Committee for exceptional services to world Scouting in 2003, at the 37th World Scout Conference.
