= Philip Alphonse Tossijn =

Belgian writer

International Commissioner of the Vlaams Verbond der Katholieke Scouts

Philip Alphonse Tossijn was a senior member of Flemish Catholic Scouting, who served as the International Commissioner of the Vlaams Verbond der Katholieke Scouts (VVKS), as well as a member of the World Scout Committee. Between 1977 and 1979, he was President of the World Committee of the International Scout and Guide Fellowship. He also wrote several works on Scoutcraft and knotwork in Dutch.

In 1967, Tossijn was awarded the 49th Bronze Wolf, the only distinction of the World Organization of the Scout Movement, awarded by the World Scout Committee for exceptional services to world Scouting, at the 21st World Scout Conference. The only Belgian to have received this decoration, his medal is exhibited at the Scout museum in Leuven.
