= Fawzi Farghali =

Arab Regional Scout Executive for the World Scout Bureau

Arab Regional Scout Executive for the World Scout Bureau

Fawzi Farghali (Arabic: فوزي فرغلي) (-August 31, 2009 in Cairo) served as Arab Regional Scout Executive for the World Scout Bureau.

In 1986, he was awarded the 186th Bronze Wolf, the only distinction of the World Organization of the Scout Movement, awarded by the World Scout Committee for exceptional services to world Scouting.
