= Daniel Oscar Tagata =

- 田方ダニエル・オスカル

President of the Asociación de Scouts del Perú

Daniel Oscar Tagata (Japanese: 田方ダニエル・オスカル, romanized: Tagata Danieru Osukaru) served as the president of the Asociación de Scouts del Perú, as well as the Community Development Executive and Director for Management Development of the Interamerican Scout Office.

A Peruvian of Japanese descent, Tagata was awarded the 263rd Bronze Wolf, the only distinction of the World Organization of the Scout Movement, awarded by the World Scout Committee for exceptional services to world Scouting, in 1997.
