= Philippe Pijollet =

- Born: 1940
- Died: November 17, 2006 (aged 65–66)
- Scientific career
- Fields: English
- Institutions: World Scout Bureau

Philippe Pijollet (1940-November 17, 2006) was a French English professor who served as the Director of Adult Resources of the World Scout Bureau, and was also in charge of African issues.

In 2002, Pijollet was awarded the 293rd Bronze Wolf, the only distinction of the World Organization of the Scout Movement, awarded by the World Scout Committee for exceptional services to world Scouting.
