= Mateo Jover =

Director of Research of the Interamerican Scout Office

Mateo Jover (Spanish pronunciation: [maˈteo xoˈβeɾ]) served as the Director of Research of the Interamerican Scout Office, Director of Development Education of the European Scout Office, and Director of Programme as well as Director of Prospective Studies and Documentation of the World Scout Bureau.

Jover retired in March 1999. The same year, Jover was awarded the 273rd Bronze Wolf, the only distinction of the World Organization of the Scout Movement, awarded by the World Scout Committee for exceptional services to world Scouting.
