= Liu Chih-yun =

Former Deputy International Commissioner of the Boy Scouts of China

- 劉熾雲

Deputy International Commissioner of the Boy Scouts of China

Chih-Yun Liu (Chinese: 劉熾雲; pinyin: Liú Chìyún) served as Deputy International Commissioner of the Boy Scouts of China.

In 1995, Liu was awarded the 242nd Bronze Wolf, the only distinction of the World Organization of the Scout Movement, awarded by the World Scout Committee for exceptional services to world Scouting.
