= Laurent Dominicé =

Swiss advocate and banker (1929–2021)

Treasurer of the World Scout Committee

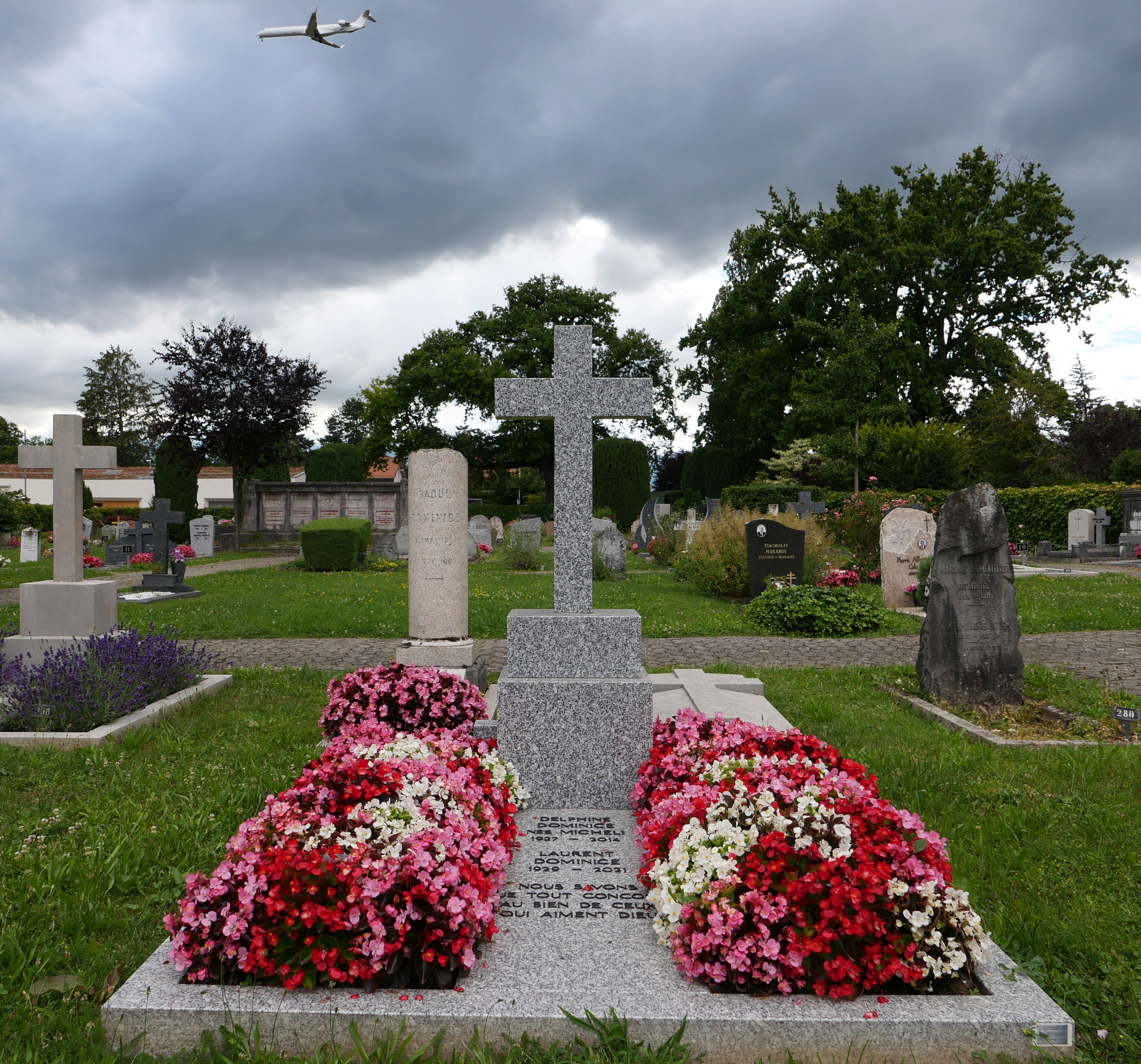
The grave in 2024.

Laurent Dominicé (9 May 1929 – 22 November 2021) was a Swiss advocate and banker, who served as the Treasurer of the World Scout Committee.

Dominicé worked from 1970 until 1991 in high ranking positions at the Geneva-based private bank Lombard-Odier.

In 1977, Dominicé was awarded the 117th Bronze Wolf, the only distinction of the World Organization of the Scout Movement, awarded by the World Scout Committee for exceptional services to world Scouting.

He found his final resting place at the cemetery of Genthod in the grave of his wife Delphine, née Micheli (1937-2014).
