= Charles Celier =

French politician (1912–1992)

Vice president and Chairman of the Administration Committee of the World Scout Committee

Personal details
- Born: 1912
- Died: 1 November 1992 (aged 79–80)

Charles Celier (1912 – 1 November 1992) was a French politician who served as the vice president and Chairman of the Administration Committee of the World Scout Committee.

== Background ==
Son of the historian Léonce Celier, Charles Celier was a Scout in Versailles with the abbot Paul Marie André Richaud, then head of the 25th Paris Group of Scouts de France.

In the 1930s, Celier joined the headquarters as Deputy National Scout Commissioner to Michel Blanchon, then as member of the Conseil National, in charge of finance of the Conseil d'État. In early 1939, he was appointed Assistant Commissioner of the Conseil National for Scouting.

During Vichy France, he was director of cabinet of the minister Paul Baudouin, perhaps at the suggestion of Henry Dhavernas.

Although he became assistant to Pierre Delsuc in 1944, he quickly opposed him. After World War II, as Deputy International Commissioner of the Scouts de France, he was sent to the United States to study their Scouting.

Having become a business lawyer, he shared the social and political ideas of Pierre Goutet. His ascent began in 1956, after the eviction of General Joseph Lafont, Father Marcel Forestier, Michel Blanchon and others form the National Council.

In 1973, Celier became international commissioner and was commissioned by Émile-Xavier Visseaux to re-establish links with other associations.

In 1973, Celier was awarded the 75th Bronze Wolf, the only distinction of the World Organization of the Scout Movement, awarded by the World Scout Committee for exceptional services to world Scouting.

His archives are in Riaumont.
