= John M. Lioufis =

- Ιωάννης Λιουφης

Commissioner of the Greek Scouts in Egypt

John M. Lioufis (Greek: Ιωάννης Λιουφης, Egyptian Arabic: جون ليوفيس) served as the Commissioner of the Greek Scouts in Egypt.

In 1978, Lioufis was awarded the 127th Bronze Wolf, the only distinction of the World Organization of the Scout Movement, awarded by the World Scout Committee for exceptional services to world Scouting.
