= Peter Cooke (Scouting) =

Overseas Secretary and the Commonwealth Secretary of the Scout Association

Peter Cooke served as the Overseas Secretary and the Commonwealth Secretary of the Scout Association. In 1978, Cooke was awarded the 126th Bronze Wolf, the only distinction of the World Organization of the Scout Movement, awarded by the World Scout Committee for exceptional services to world Scouting.
