= Mohammed Saleh Al Qahtani =

- Known for: Board Member of the Boy Scouts of Bahrain

Mohammed Saleh Al Qahtani (Arabic: محمد صالح القحطاني) served as a board member of the Boy Scouts of Bahrain, as well as a member of the Arab Scout Committee.

In 1994, he was awarded the 235th Bronze Wolf, the only distinction of the World Organization of the Scout Movement, awarded by the World Scout Committee for exceptional services to world Scouting.
