= René Sibomana =

General Commissioner of the Association des Scouts du Rwanda

René Sibomana served as the General Commissioner of the Association des Scouts du Rwanda. In 1990, he was awarded the 211th Bronze Wolf, the only distinction of the World Organization of the Scout Movement, awarded by the World Scout Committee for exceptional services to world Scouting.
