= Malick M'Baye (Scouting) =

Executive Secretary to the Director General of UNESCO

Malick M'Baye, born in French West Africa, was the Executive Secretary to the Director General of UNESCO, and served as the National and International Trainer of the Confédération Sénégalaise du Scoutisme, as well as an advisor to the World Organization of the Scout Movement on its relationship with UNESCO.

He was a member of the Eclaireurs de France d'Afrique Occidentale and later of the Éclaireuses et Éclaireurs du Sénégal. In 1999, he was awarded the 275th Bronze Wolf, the only distinction of WOSM, awarded by the World Scout Committee for exceptional services to world Scouting.
