= Jos Loos =

International Commissioner and General Commissioner of the Lëtzebuerger Scouten

Jos Loos served as International Commissioner (1968-1969/1975-1987), General Commissioner (1969-1975) and Commissioner for national relations (1987-1993) of the Lëtzebuerger Scouten.

In 1991, Loos was awarded the 216th Bronze Wolf, the only distinction of the World Organization of the Scout Movement, awarded by the World Scout Committee for exceptional services to world Scouting.
