= Niels Engberg =

International Commissioner of the Fællesrådet for Danmarks Drengespejdere

Niels Engberg served as the International Commissioner of the Fællesrådet for Danmarks Drengespejdere, as well as a member of the World Scout Committee.

== Background ==
In 1969, Engberg was awarded the 52nd Bronze Wolf, the only distinction of the World Organization of the Scout Movement, awarded by the World Scout Committee for exceptional services to world Scouting.
