= Fujio Imada =

- 今田 富士雄

Deputy National Commissioner and Deputy International Commissioner of the Scout Association of Japan

Fujio Imada (今田 富士雄, Imada Fujio) (-‡2002 to 2005) served as the Deputy National Commissioner and Deputy International Commissioner of the Scout Association of Japan.

Imada was a Varsity Scout, a Keio University graduate, and a member of Keio Scout Mita-kai alumni association. He led a group of Japanese Boy Scouts who attended Jamboree in the United States in 1960.

In 2004, Imada was awarded the 300th Bronze Wolf, the only distinction of the World Organization of the Scout Movement, awarded by the World Scout Committee for exceptional services to world Scouting.
