= Patrick Lyon d'Andrimont =

President of the Asociación de Guías y Scouts de Chile

Patrick Lyon D'Andrimont served as the president of the Asociación de Guías y Scouts de Chile, president of the Interamerican Scout Committee, and vice-chairman of the World Scout Committee.

== Background ==
Lyon was camp chief of the 19th World Scout Jamboree at Picarquín, Chile.

In 2004, Lyon was awarded the 301st Bronze Wolf, the only distinction of the World Organization of the Scout Movement, awarded by the World Scout Committee for exceptional services to world Scouting.
