= Katsura Kuno =

- 久野 桂
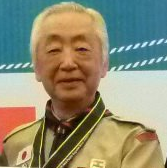

International Commissioner and advisor of the Scout Association of Japan

Katsura Kuno (久野 桂, Kuno Katsura) served as the International Commissioner and advisor of the Scout Association of Japan, as well as Chairman of the Asia-Pacific Public Relations Subcommittee and Regional Task Force in 2007.

Kuno was a Varsity Scout, a Keio University graduate, and a member of Keio Scout Mita-kai alumni association.

In 2010, Kuno was awarded the 324th Bronze Wolf, the only distinction of the World Organization of the Scout Movement, awarded by the World Scout Committee for exceptional services to world Scouting.
