= Pierre Bodineau =

French legal historian (1944)

- Born: 1943 (age 82–83)
- Occupation: Academic

Academic background
- Education: Bachelor in Law and Literature, PhD
- Alma mater: University of Dijon
- Thesis: L’urbanisme en Bourgogne à la fin de l’Ancien Régime (1973)

Academic work
- Discipline: Public law
- Institutions: Economic and Social Council of Burgundy
- Main interests: Law, literature, scouting
- Notable works: Histoire et témoignages des éclaireurs et éclaireuses de France à Dijon et en Bourgogne de 1914 à nos jours

Pierre Bodineau (born 1943) is a French academic in public law and politician, President of the Economic and Social Council of Burgundy, presided over Scoutisme Français from 1979 to 1982 and served as a member of the European Scout Committee.

Bodineau was troop chief, regional commissioner of Éclaireuses et éclaireurs de France, and international delegate, especially involved in assisting the rebirth of Scouting in the countries of Eastern Europe and the former Soviet Union.

== Background ==
Bodineau graduated from Lycée Carnot in 1961. He studied at the University of Dijon where he got his undergraduate degrees in law and literature. In 1973, he got his doctorate degree (Thesis titled: "L’urbanisme en Bourgogne à la fin de l’Ancien Régime"). Bodineau was an assistant professor at the University of Dijon's School of Law from 1967 to 1972.

In addition to professional works, he has directed and prefaced Histoire et témoignages des éclaireurs et éclaireuses de France à Dijon et en Bourgogne de 1914 à nos jours (History and testimonies of the Éclaireuses et éclaireurs de France in Dijon and Burgundy from 1914 to the present day), 2000.

In 1983, Bodineau was awarded the 159th Bronze Wolf, the only distinction of the World Organization of the Scout Movement, awarded by the World Scout Committee for exceptional services to world Scouting.

Bodineau co-founded Parteam, a law firm based in Nantes, with Sébastien Thouvenin.
