= Thijs Stoffer =

Dutch scouting leader

Thijs Stoffer (Dutch pronunciation: [tɛi ˈstɔfər]) is a Dutch scout who served as the chairman of the Kandersteg International Scout Centre Committee.

== Background ==
In 2011, Stoffer was awarded the 331st Bronze Wolf, the only distinction of the World Organization of the Scout Movement, awarded by the World Scout Committee for exceptional services to world Scouting.

Stoffer lives in Kandersteg, Switzerland.
