= Kenan H. Ngambi =

- Known for: Member of the Africa Scout Committee

Kenan H. Ng'ambi of Zambia served as a member of the Africa Scout Committee. In 1973, he was awarded the 83rd Bronze Wolf, the only distinction of the World Organization of the Scout Movement, awarded by the World Scout Committee for exceptional services to world Scouting.
