= Christos Papageorgiou (Scouting) =

- Χρήστος Παπαγεωργίου

Secretary General of the International Link of Orthodox Christian Scouts

Christos Papageorgiou (Greek: Χρήστος Παπαγεωργίου Athens, Greece, 13 October 1944) served as the Secretary General of the International Link of Orthodox Christian Scouts, and now serves as honorary President.

In 2016, Papageorgiou was awarded the 353rd Bronze Wolf, the only distinction of the World Organization of the Scout Movement, awarded by the World Scout Committee for exceptional services to world Scouting.
