= Abdallah Zouaghi =

- Tunisian Scout delegation to Alexandria in July–August 1956. Abdallah Zouaghi is the third man standing from the left. Standing from left to right: Rachid Sfar, Abdelaziz Bel-Hadj Taieb, Abdallah Zouaghi, an Egyptian guest, Azouz Rebai (first undersecretary of state of youth of recently independent Tunisia) then an Egyptian Scout chief. Sitting Scout leaders Abdelazir Triki, Taien Nouira and Abdelmajid A.
- Known for: Member of the Arab Scout Committee

Abdallah Zouaghi (Arabic: عبد الله الزواغي; Berber languages: ⵄⴱⴷⵍⵍⴰⵀ ⵥⵡⴰⵖⵉ) served as a member of the Arab Scout Committee.

In 1976, he was awarded the 114th Bronze Wolf, the only distinction of the World Organization of the Scout Movement, awarded by the World Scout Committee for exceptional services to world Scouting.
