= Demetrios Alexatos =

National Commissioner of the Scouts of Greece from 1948 to 1965

- Δημήτριος Αλεξάτος

National Commissioner of the Scouts of Greece
- In office 1948–1965

Demetrios Alexatos (Greek: Δημήτριος Αλεξάτος; 26 October 1919 in Constantinople – 8 April 2001 in Athens) Scout name "Rann", meaning "Brahminy kite" from The Jungle Book, served as the National Commissioner of the Scouts of Greece for 17 years, from 1948 to 1965, on the personal recommendation of king Paul of Greece, Camp Chief of the 11th World Scout Jamboree held 1–11 August 1963 in Marathon, as well as an elected member of the World Scout Committee from 1957 to 1963.

Alexatos was born 26 October 1919 to parents from Cephalonia in the Ionian Islands in western Greece, who had lived in Constantinople for many years. He gave his Scout promise in 1932 at the 9th Troop of Athens. He was married but he did not have any children. During World War II he served in the Royal Hellenic Navy, and he went to Alexandria where he was a leader of the Greek Rover Scouts.

He was first elected as secretary of the Scouts of Greece, and in 1952 he was awarded the highest Greek Scout medal, and the Silver Wolf Award, the highest award made by The Scout Association of the United Kingdom "for services of the most exceptional character."

Alexatos introduced the current World Scout Emblem at the 8th World Scout Jamboree in 1955.

In 1963, Alexatos was awarded the 29th Bronze Wolf Award, the only distinction of the World Organization of the Scout Movement, awarded by the World Scout Committee for exceptional services to world Scouting.

He was the only Scout in Greece who was voted honorary President of the Greek Scouts. The Greek National Scout Center was named in his honor. In the Athens Scout headquarters, visitors are able to see his Scout collections.

== Publications ==
- Alexatos, Demetrios (1997), Scouting: a Wonderful World, published by the Scouts of Greece (in Greek)
- Alexatos, Demetrios (2000), In the Way of a Life ISBN 960-7630-10-6 (in Greek)
