= Jonathan How (Scouting) =

Father Jonathan How is a UK Scout leader and Roman Catholic priest of the Diocese of Arundel and Brighton. Fr Jonathan was responsible for the Faith and Belief zone at the EuroJam 2005 and at the World Scout Jamboree 2007.

== Background ==
Since 2012 Fr Jonathan has served as the Advisor on Spiritual and Religious Development to the World Scout Movement. In this capacity Jonathan has been crucial in the work with the "Spirituality in Scouting" and the "Survey On Spiritual Development In Scouting Analysis Report".

Fr Jonathan serves as National Catholic Scout Chaplain for the UK.

In 2017, Fr Jonathan was awarded the 360th Bronze Wolf, the only distinction of the WOSM, awarded by the World Scout Committee for exceptional services to world Scouting.
