= John Durie Stewart =

British Scouting official

John Durie Stewart served as the Assistant International Commissioner of the Scout Association.

In 1963, Stewart was awarded the 31st Bronze Wolf, the only distinction of the World Organization of the Scout Movement, awarded by the World Scout Committee for exceptional services to world Scouting.
