= Wayne Davis (World Scout Committee) =

Dr. Wayne A. Davis is an educator, nonprofit leader, and former member of the World Scout Committee, the executive body of the World Organization of the Scout Movement (WOSM). He previously served as Regional Chair of the Africa Scout Committee, contributing to the expansion of Scouting and youth leadership programs across Africa. He previously served as the Regional Chair of the African Regional Scout Committee.

In 2012, he was appointed as WOSM's representative to the African Union, advocating for youth empowerment, leadership training, and civic engagement. He has contributed to policy discussions on non-formal education and has engaged with international leaders and organizations to promote youth development through Scouting. In July 2025, he was awarded the Bronze Wolf Award, WOSM's highest award.

== Background ==
Wayne Davis holds an EdD in Educational Leadership from Liberty University, MAT in Special Education from Relay Graduate School of Education, and an MBA from Lincoln University. His career spans educational leadership, youth development, and nonprofit management, with a strong focus on equipping students and educators with effective learning strategies. He founded a school in Addis Ababa, Ethiopia, where he implemented leadership development and academic enrichment programs. After moving to the United States, he became the Executive Director of Sylvan Learning in Woodbridge, New Jersey, overseeing student achievement programs and educator training initiatives. His work at Sylvan Learning continues to support academic growth and personalized education for students.

== Global Leadership in Scouting ==
Davis has played a significant role in the Scouting movement, beginning with his leadership in the Ethiopia Scout Association, where he held multiple national leadership positions, including Chief Commissioner. He was later elected Chairperson of the Africa Scout Committee, leading initiatives that strengthened Scouting's impact across the region. Dr. Davis has spoken at global conferences, delivering insights on education, leadership, and Scouting's role in shaping future generations. His contributions continue to influence Scouting's strategic direction and global outreach. He currently serves as a board member of the Patriots Path Council of the Boy Scouts of America, in New Jersey, among other scouting responsibilities he undertakes.

== Ongoing Impact ==
Davis remains actively engaged in youth leadership and education initiatives, advocating for programs that provide young people with the skills, knowledge, and values needed to become future leaders. and became involved with the Ethiopia Scout Association, serving in various national positions. He eventually moved back to New Jersey to work for Sylvan Learning in a school in Woodbridge.
