= Malek K. Gabr =

- مالك جبر

Director for Educational Methods of the World Scout Bureau
- In office 1985–1991

Personal details
- Born: 1943 Cairo, Egypt
- Died: 28 January 2007 (aged 63–64)

Malek K. Gabr (Egyptian Arabic: مالك جبر) was an Egyptian Scouting leader who served as director for educational methods of the World Scout Bureau and also dealt with constitutional affairs from 1985 to 1991, then as assistant secretary general from 1991 to 2004.Institute of Higher Stu

He entered the World Scout office in 1969 after his doctorate in international law, served as assistant professor at Cairo University, and received a doctorate at the Graduate Institute of International Studies of the University of Geneva.

In 1985, he was awarded the 175th Bronze Wolf, the only distinction of the World Organization of the Scout Movement, awarded by the World Scout Committee for exceptional services to world Scouting.
