= Wally Denny =

A. Wallace Denny

Deputy Chief Scout of the Boy Scouts of Canada

Albert Wallace Denny (December 19, 1906 – June 17, 2008) was an engineer and Vice President of Goodyear Canada, who served as National Commissioner of the Boy Scouts of Canada. He was born in Indianapolis and married Edith Litchfield in 1930. Both Denny and Litchfield were blimp pilots (Litchfield held the record for most hours flown by a woman in blimps for many years) and were both members of the United Flying Octogenarians (solo flight on or after one's 80th birthday). In 1977, Denny was awarded the 116th Bronze Wolf, the highest distinction of the World Organization of the Scout Movement, awarded by the World Scout Committee for exceptional services to world Scouting, at the 26th World Scout Conference. Denny started the Trees for Canada fundraising program, which by his 100th birthday had resulted in the planting of 70 million trees.
