= Arne Lundberg =

Chairman and Chief Scout of the Nykterhetsrörelsens Scoutförbund

Arne Lundberg (10 October 1925 - 19 December 1993) was a Swedish Scout and Temperance leader. He was the chairman and Chief Scout of the IOGT Scouts between 1966 and 1971 and chairman and Chief Scout of the Swedish Temperance Guide and Scout Association between 1970 and 1973 and between 1976 and 1984.

He was awarded the Silver Wolf, the highest Swedish scout award in 1961.

In 1988, Lundberg was awarded the 191st Bronze Wolf, the only distinction of the World Organization of the Scout Movement, awarded by the World Scout Committee for exceptional services to world Scouting.
