= Norman S. Johnson =

Dentist and international Scouting official

Chairman of the World Organization of the Scout Movement committee

Norman S. Johnson (died 1989) was a dentist, scout leader and an Australian and international Scout organisation official.

== Background ==
Johnson was a student (1931–43) and Scout and, subsequently, a Scoutmaster of Trinity Grammar School at Kew in Melbourne, Victoria, Australia. In 1945 he authored Camping for scouts and others which ran to three further editions.

He became an official of The Boy Scouts Association Victorian Branch, as a leader trainer, commissioner and, from 1976 to 1979, its Victorian Chief Commissioner. He became The Scout Association of Australia's national executive committee chairman.

He was a member, then chairman of the World Organization of the Scout Movement (WOSM) committee. In 1990, WOSM posthumously awarded Johnson it 212th Bronze Wolf Award for exceptional services to world Scouting.
