= Fathy Farghali =

Deputy Regional Director for Community Development of the World Scout Bureau Arab Regional Scout Office

Fathy Farghali (Arabic: فتحي فرغلي) served as Deputy Regional Director for Community Development of the World Scout Bureau Arab Regional Scout Office.

In 2011, he was awarded the 329th Bronze Wolf, the only distinction of the World Organization of the Scout Movement, awarded by the World Scout Committee for exceptional services to world Scouting.
