= Jean Salvaj =

International Commissioner of the Swiss Scout Federation

Jean Salvaj served as the International Commissioner of the Swiss Scout Federation, as well as a member of the International Scout Committee.

In 1953, Salvaj was awarded the 7th Bronze Wolf, the only distinction of the World Organization of the Scout Movement, awarded by the World Scout Committee for exceptional services to world Scouting.
