= Richard Burdick =

International Commissioner of the Boy Scouts of America

International Commissioner of the Boy Scouts of America
- In office 1996–2003

Personal details
- Born: 28 May 1929 New Braunfels, Texas
- Died: February 25, 2018 (aged 88) New Braunfels, Texas

Richard "Dick" Burdick, (28 May 1929-February 25, 2018) served as the International Commissioner of the Boy Scouts of America from 1996 to 2003, after a long career with the BSA. While working at E.I. duPont de Numours in La Porte, Texas, he developed Heat Transfer Cement which became the basis of his company, Thermon Manufacturing, founded by him in Houston in 1954.

In 2004, Burdick was awarded the 299th Bronze Wolf, the only distinction of the World Organization of the Scout Movement, awarded by the World Scout Committee for exceptional services to world Scouting.
