= Manzoor Ul Karim =

- মনযূর উল করীম

Former CSP and Chief National Commissioner of the Bangladesh Scouts

Manzoor Ul Karim (Bengali: মনযূর উল করীম) served as the Chief National Commissioner of the Bangladesh Scouts.

He served as the Secretary of the Government of Bangladesh in various key ministries including Home Affairs, Communications, Information, Health, Civil Aviation And Tourism, Labor and Manpower.

He hosted the first flag of Independent Bangladesh in Noakhali district as a District commissioner (DC) of Noakhali, Bangladesh.

In 1990, he was awarded the 206th Bronze Wolf, the only distinction of the World Organization of the Scout Movement, awarded by the World Scout Committee for exceptional services to world Scouting.

Mr. Karim died at Apollo hospital Dhaka on 4 December 2017. He left behind his only son Munazzir Shehmat Karim, only daughter Naushin Farzana Karim, daughter in-law Gulnaz Alam, son-in-law Aminul Haque and two grandchildren Kaifee Haque and Kareef Haque.
