= Mostafa Salem =

- ⵎⵚⵟⴰⴼⴰ ⵙⴰⵍⵎ

Chairman of the World Scout Programme Committee

Mostafa Salem (Arabic: مصطفى سالم; Berber languages: ⵎⵚⵟⴰⴼⴰ ⵙⴰⵍⵎ) served as Chairman of the World Scout Programme Committee, and as a member of the World Scout Committee.

In 2000, he was awarded the 286th Bronze Wolf, the only distinction of the World Organization of the Scout Movement, awarded by the World Scout Committee for exceptional services to world Scouting.
