= Alex Comninos =

President of the Scouts of Greece from 1991 to 1995

Alexander Comninos
- Αλέξανδρος Κομνηνός

President of the Scouts of Greece

Alexander Comninos Greek: Αλέξανδρος Κομνηνός served as the President of the Scouts of Greece from 1991 to 1995.

In 1996, Comninos was awarded the 247th Bronze Wolf, the only distinction of the World Organization of the Scout Movement, awarded by the World Scout Committee for exceptional services to world Scouting.

== See also ==
- Komnenos
