= Eberhard von Koerber =

German business manager

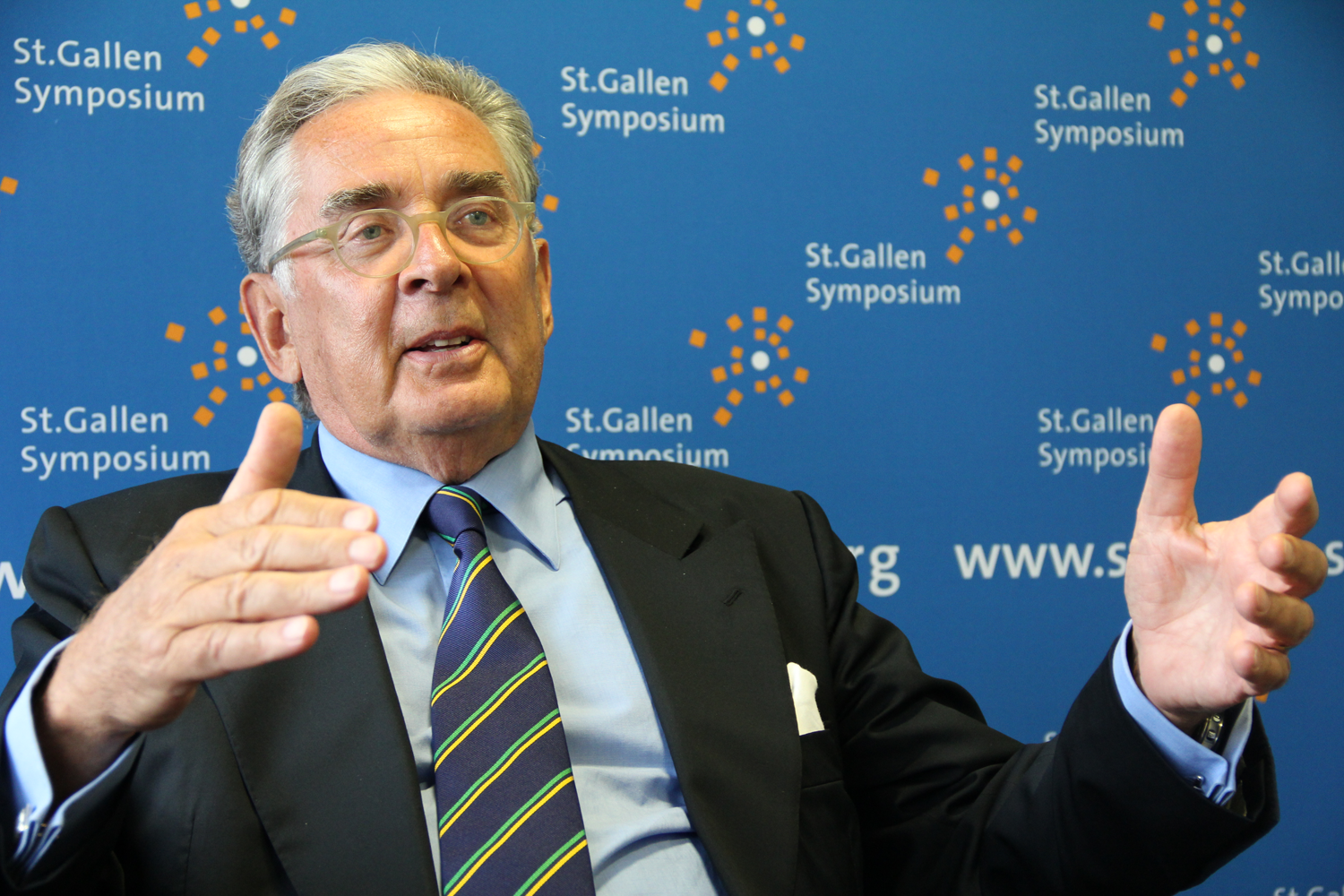
- Von Koerber in 2012
- Born: 11 June 1938 (age 87); Stade, Lower Saxony, Germany
- Died: 3 August 2017
- Occupation: Manager
- Known for: Member of the Board of Management of BMW

Eberhard "Ebbo" von Koerber (11 June 1938 – 3 August 2017) was a German manager. As a member of the Board of Management of BMW, he was responsible for sales and marketing from 1984 to 1986. Between 1988 and 1998, he was responsible for the activities of Asea Brown Boveri in Europe, the Middle East and Africa as Vice President of the Group Executive in Zurich. From 2007 to 2012, he was co-president of the Club of Rome.

Born in Stade, Lower Saxony, he was orphaned when his father was killed during World War II and later joined Scouting in the late 1940s. At 14, he was a patrol leader. After studying law, he became a businessman and settled in Switzerland.

From 2003 to 2006, von Koerber served as the chairman of the World Scout Foundation of the World Organization of the Scout Movement from 2003 to 2006. In 2009, he was awarded the 320th Bronze Wolf, the only distinction of the World Organization of the Scout Movement, awarded by the World Scout Committee for exceptional services to world Scouting. He died on 3 August 2017 at the age of 79.
