= Jørgen Guldborg-Rasmussen =

President of the Danish Scout Council

President of the Fællesrådet for Danmarks Drengespejdere

Jørgen Guldborg-Rasmussen served as the President of the Fællesrådet for Danmarks Drengespejdere Danish Scout Council, as well as a member of the National Board of the Danish Scout and Guide Association.

In 1993, Rasmussen was awarded the 228th Bronze Wolf, the only distinction of the World Organization of the Scout Movement, awarded by the World Scout Committee for exceptional services to world Scouting.
