= Vladimir Lomeiko =

Russian diplomat

- Владимир Ломейко
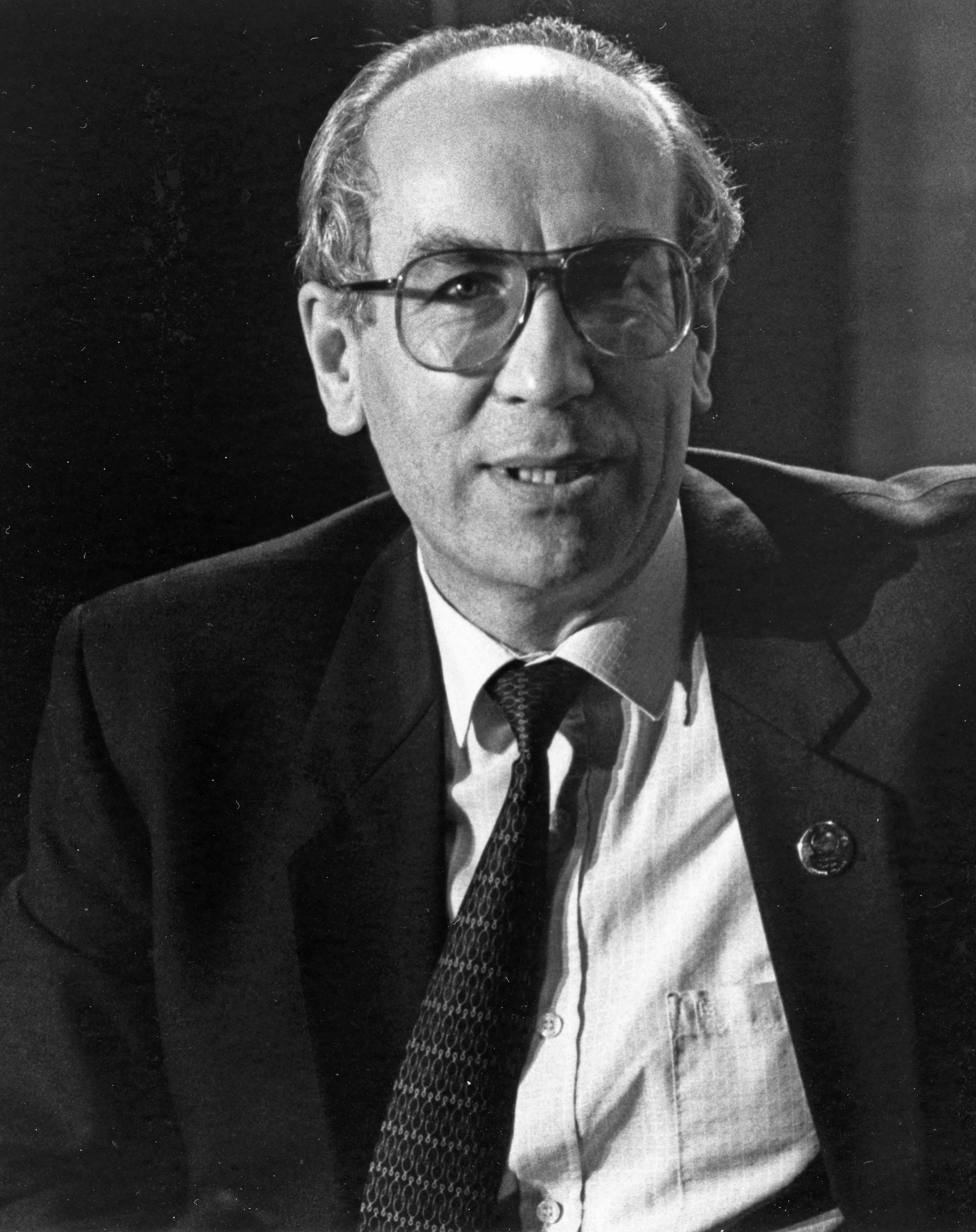
- Lomeiko in 1991

Personal details
- Born: 27 November 1935; Novorossiysk, USSR
- Died: 15 August 2009 (aged 73); Moscow, Russia

Vladimir Borisovich Lomeiko (Russian: Владимир Борисович Ломейко; 27 November 1935 – 15 August 2009) was a Russian diplomat, later a Belarusian national. Lomeiko was the foreign policy spokesman of then Soviet Foreign Minister Edward Shevardnadze and the last spokesman of Mikhail Gorbachev before the end of the Soviet Union. Subsequently, Lomeiko assumed the position of the Russian Ambassador to UNESCO, as well as that of Special Advisor to the Director General of UNESCO. He lived in Baden-Baden and was Executive Chairman of the Baden-Baden-Forum, a non-profit organization dedicated to German-Russian dialogue.

He visited a camp of the Scouts de France welcoming children affected by the Chernobyl disaster with the Secretary General of the World Organization of the Scout Movement.

Lomeiko became vice president of the World Scout Foundation, and was awarded the 274th Bronze Wolf, the only distinction of WOSM, awarded by the World Scout Committee for exceptional services to world Scouting in 1999.

He was a long-serving member of the supervisory board of the Global Panel Foundation
