= Karin Ahlbäck =

Finnish scouter

Karin Ahlbäck of Malax, Finland was a member of the World Scout Committee, the main executive body of the World Organization of the Scout Movement until the World Scout Conference in 2017. From 2008 to 2011, Ahlbäck served as Youth Advisor to the World Scout Committee representing the World Scout Youth Forum, serving in the Educational Methods Committee, Registration Fee Task Force and World Scout Youth Forum 2011 Planning Committee, and was elected to the World Scout Committee at the 39th World Scout Conference in Brazil in January 2011, and again at the 40th World Scout Conference in Ljubljana, Slovenia in 2014.

Ahlbäck lives in Helsinki, works as a management consultant, and holds a Masters in Applied Mathematics and Engineering from Helsinki University of Technology in Otaniemi, Finland. She studied abroad at the École Polytechnique Fédérale de Lausanne in Lausanne, Switzerland.

In 2018, Karin was awarded the 364th Bronze Wolf, the only distinction of the World Organization of the Scout Movement, awarded by the World Scout Committee for exceptional services to world Scouting.

== See also ==
- List of recipients of the Bronze Wolf Award
