= Salomon Matalon =

- Known for: Created the first Scout troop in Senegal

Salomon Matalon created the first Scout troop in Senegal in October 1935 and founded the Éclaireuses et Éclaireurs du Sénégal in 1937.

In 1997, Matalon was awarded the 259th Bronze Wolf, the only distinction of the World Organization of the Scout Movement, awarded by the World Scout Committee for exceptional services to world Scouting
