= Farid Karam =

- Known for: Member of the World Scout Committee

Farid Karam (Arabic: فريد كرم) served as a member of the World Scout Committee.

In 1977, he was awarded the 119th Bronze Wolf, the only distinction of the World Organization of the Scout Movement, awarded by the World Scout Committee for exceptional services to world Scouting.
