= Mario Díaz Martínez =

Dr. Mario Díaz Martínez (November 30, 1965) of Spain was one of 12 elected volunteer members of the World Scout Committee, the main executive body of the World Organization of the Scout Movement. He served as the liaison to the International Catholic Conference of Scouting (ICCS), and was elected Vice-Chairman of the World Scout Committee with Simon Rhee at the 38th World Scout Conference in South Korea in 2008. His term on the World Scout Committee expired at the 39th World Scout Conference in Brazil in 2011.

In 2014, he was awarded the 343rd Bronze Wolf, the only distinction of the World Organization of the Scout Movement, awarded by the World Scout Committee for exceptional services to world Scouting.

In 2014 Mario was awarded the Gustaf Adolfs-märket, an award given by Scouterna (Sweden).

Díaz Martínez is a professor and associate dean in the Faculty of Business and Economics at the Universidad de León in León, Spain.
