= Chu Chang-kyun =

South Korean scouting official (1921–2012)

- Born: 7 November 1921
- Died: 29 December 2012 (aged 91)
- Known for: President of the Korea Scout Association

Korean name
- Hangul: 주창균
- Hanja: 朱昌均
- RR: Ju Changgyun
- MR: Chu Ch'anggyun

Art name
- Hangul: 현송
- Hanja: 玄松
- RR: Hyeonsong
- MR: Hyŏnsong

Chu Chang-kyun (Korean: 주창균; Hanja: 朱昌均; 7 November 1921 – 29 December 2012) served as the President of the Korea Scout Association. In 1988, Chu was awarded the 189th Bronze Wolf, the only distinction of the World Organization of the Scout Movement, awarded by the World Scout Committee for exceptional services to world Scouting.

== See also ==
- Dongbu Steel
