= Zuhair Ghunaim =

Saudi Arabian Scout

Zuhair Hussain Ghunaim
- الدكتور زهير حسين غنيم

Secretary General of the International Union of Muslim Scouts
- In office ?

Personal details
- Education: University of Sfax
- Awards: Bronze Wolf

Zuhair Hussain Ghunaim (Arabic: الدكتور زهير حسين غنيم) from Jeddah, Saudi Arabia served as the Secretary General of the International Union of Muslim Scouts.

In 2012, Ghunaim was awarded the 336th Bronze Wolf, the only distinction of the World Organization of the Scout Movement, awarded by the World Scout Committee for exceptional services to world Scouting.

Ghunaim studied at Institut Supérieur d'Informatique et de Multimédia de Sfax and lives in Jeddah, Saudi Arabia.
