= Goddanti Ranga Rao =

- గొద్దంటి రంగారావు

Director of the Bharat Scouts and Guides

Goddanti Ranga Rao (Telugu: గొద్దంటి రంగారావు) is an Indian who served as the Director of the Bharat Scouts and Guides. In 1994, Ranga Rao was awarded the 238th Bronze Wolf, the highest distinction of the World Organization of the Scout Movement, granted by the World Scout Committee for exceptional services to world Scouting.
