= Wolf Kuhnke =

Wolf Kuhnke served as the President of the Ring deutscher Pfadfinderverbände, as well as the Chairman of the Bund der Pfadfinderinnen und Pfadfinder.

In 1990, Kuhnke was awarded the 207th Bronze Wolf, the only distinction of the World Organization of the Scout Movement, awarded by the World Scout Committee for exceptional services to world Scouting.

== Works ==
- Blaue Blume und Spinnrocken. Die Geschichte des Bundes Deutscher Pfadfinderinnen 1912−1933. Bund der Pfadfinderinnen und Pfadfinder, Gießen 1984
