= Nicolas Hosch =

Deputy General Commissioner of Lëtzebuerger Scouten

- Néckel Hosch

Deputy General Commissioner of the Lëtzebuerger Scouten
- In office 1966–1975
- Preceded by: Armand Pundel
- Succeeded by: Fernand Godart

Nicolas Hosch (1914-1990) was involved with the Lëtzebuerger Scouten for over half a century, including more than 40 years as finance (1944-1979) and administration commissioner (1944-1966/1975-1983), international commissioner (1971-1975) and deputy general commissioner (1966-1975). He was the first Luxembourg Scout to be awarded the Bronze Wolf award.

Hosch worked for the Luxembourg insurance company La Luxembourgeoise. He was a member of the Christian Social People's Party, president of the Caisse de maladie des employés privés, a member of the Luxembourg Olympic and Sporting Committee and a member of the Conseil Supérieur de l'Education Physique.

In 1979, Hosch was awarded the 136th Bronze Wolf, the only distinction of the World Organization of the Scout Movement, awarded by the World Scout Committee for exceptional services to world Scouting, at the World Scout Conference in Birmingham in 1979, becoming the first Luxembourger to be honored with this Scout distinction.
