= Association des Guides du Rwanda =

National Girl Guides organization of Rwanda

- Guides Association of Rwanda
- Country: Rwanda
- Founded: 1962
- Membership: 9,807
- Executive Secretary: Josiane Umutoniwase
- Affiliation: World Association of Girl Guides and Girl Scouts
- Website http://www.rwandagirlguides.org/

The Association des Guides du Rwanda (AGR; Rwanda Girl Guides Association) is the national Girl Guides organization of Rwanda. The association served 13,807 members (as of 2013). Founded in 1962, the girl serving organization became a full member of the World Association of Girl Guides and Girl Scouts in 1981.

== Program and ideals ==
The Guide Motto is Uwe Tayari, Be Prepared in Swahili, Ube Maso in Kinyarwanda, and Sois Prêt in French.

The Guide emblem incorporates the color scheme of the flag of Rwanda.

== Sources ==
- Rwanda Girl Guides official website

== See also ==
- Rwanda Scouts Association
