= World Scout Emblem =

Symbol of the Scout Movement

Symbol of the Scout Movement
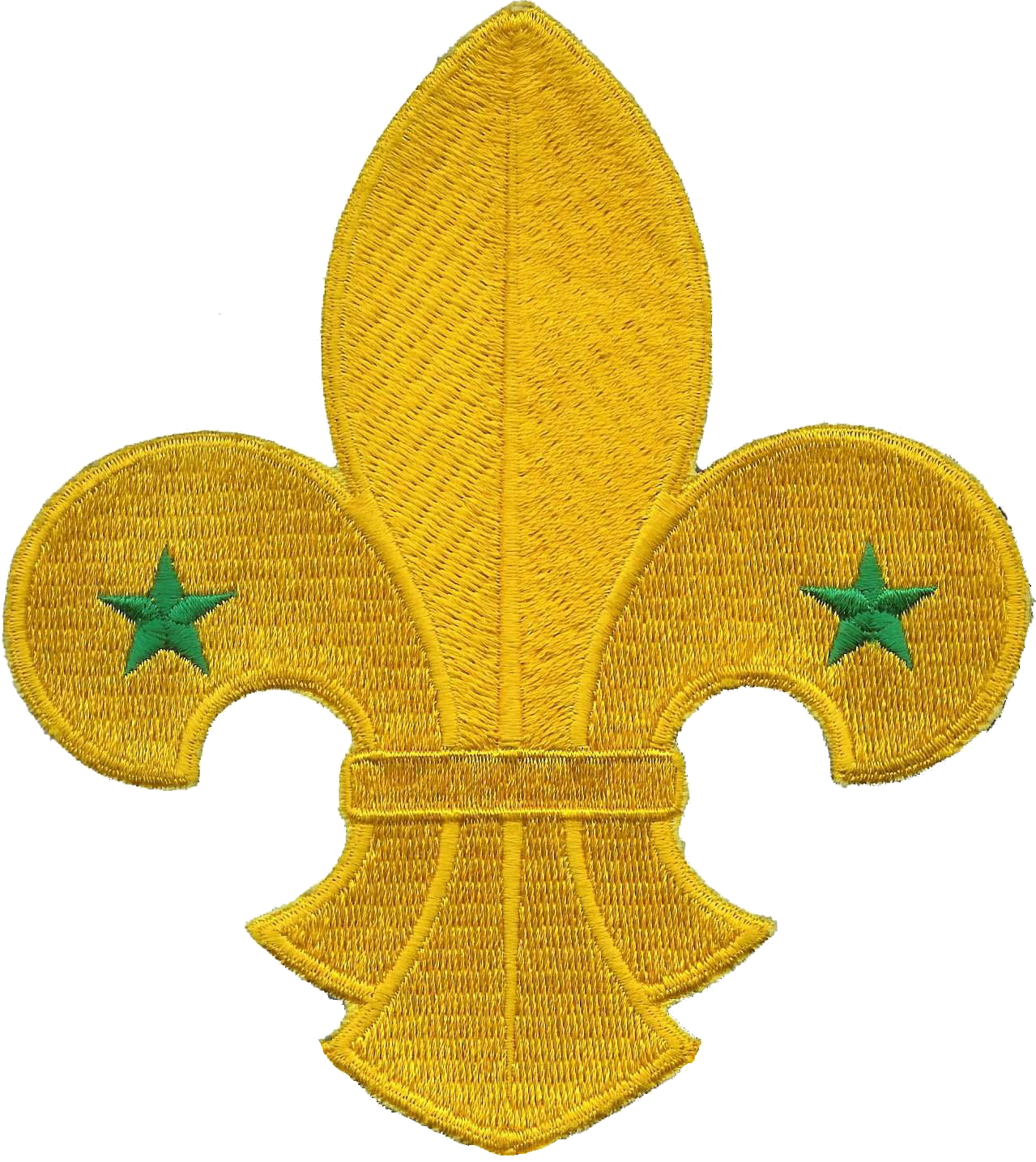
- Owner: public domain
- Country: Worldwide
- Created: 1907

The world scout emblem, used worldwide by Scouts and many Scout organizations within the Scout Movement is the fleur-de-lis, commonly with a five-point star in each outer lobe. This emblem was adopted by Scouts from the inception of the Scout Movement and is used, in various forms, by many Scout organizations.

== Origins of the emblem ==
A 1920–1939 version of the emblem used by The Scout Association

In 1897, Robert Baden-Powell trained soldiers in India in scouting. The British Army awarded trained army scouts a brass fleur-de-lis-shaped badge. In 1907, Baden-Powell issued copper fleur-de-lis badges to participants of his experimental camp on Brownsea Island in 1907 and he included a simple fleur-de-lis design Scout badge in his book, Scouting for Boys. Soon after, a five-pointed star was added to each of the outer lobes of the fleur-de-lis. Boy Scouts and Girls Scouts adopted the fleur-de-lis as their symbol.

== Symbolism ==
The fleur-de-lis represents the north point on a map or compass and is intended to point Scouts on the path to service. The three lobes on the fleur-de-lis represent the three parts of the Scout Promise: duty to God, service to others and obedience to the Scout Law. A "bond", tying the three lobes of the fleur-de-lis together, symbolizes the family of Scouting. The two five-point stars stand for truth and knowledge, with the ten points representing the ten points of the Scout Law.
