= Rwanda Scouts Association =

National Scouting organization of Rwanda

- Headquarters: Kigali
- Location: Remera
- Country: Rwanda
- Founded: 1968
- Membership: 60,000
- Affiliation: World Organization of the Scout Movement
- Website www.rwandascout.org

The Rwanda Scouts Association (RSA; formerly in French Association des Scouts du Rwanda) is the national Scouting organization of Rwanda. Scouting in Rwanda was founded in 1940 and became a member of the World Organization of the Scout Movement (WOSM) in 1975. The coeducational association has 61,000 members (as of 2025).

== History ==
The 1980s Scout emblem incorporated the color scheme of the old flag of Rwanda, and was changed to reflect the new one, as the old flag was associated with the Rwandan genocide

Scouting in Rwanda began in 1940. In the following years a number of different associations developed. In 1966, these formed a joint body, the Association des Scouts du Rwanda, which was admitted to WOSM in 1975.

The RSA hosted the African Scout Conference from September 3 to 7, 2007, in La Palisse Hotel in Kigali. This conference, preceded by the 4th Africa Scout Youth Forum, held on August 30 to September 2, 2007, had as a topic Scouting, an education for a peaceful world, united against violence.

The RSA was in the past supported by a number of European and American Scout associations, including the German Deutsche Pfadfinderschaft Sankt Georg, the Belgian Scouts en Gidsen Vlaanderen, the Association des Scouts du Canada and the Boy Scouts of America.

== Program and ideals ==
The RSA is divided in four branches:

- Cub Scouts (ages 8 to 12)
- Scouts (ages 13 to 15)
- Companions (ages 16 to 18)
- Rover Scouts (ages 19 to 25)

The Scout Motto is Be Prepared, Uwe Tayari in Swahili, Ube Maso in Kinyarwanda, and Sois Prêt in French.

== See also ==
- Association des Guides du Rwanda
