= Asociación de Guías y Scouts de Costa Rica =

Costa Rican national Scouting and Guiding association

- Guide and Scout Association of Costa Rica
- Owner: Scautscr
- Location: San José
- Country: Costa Rica
- Founded: 1915
- Membership: 11,000
- National Scout Chief: Francisco Herrera Vargas
- Chief National Guide: Sandra Cuéllar Gómez
- Affiliation: World Association of Girl Guides and Girl Scouts, World Organization of the Scout Movement
- Website siemprelistos.com

The Asociación de Guías y Scouts de Costa Rica is the national Scouting and Guiding association of Costa Rica. Scouting was founded in Costa Rica in 1915 and became a member of the World Organization of the Scout Movement in 1935. Guiding started in 1922 and became a member of the World Association of Girl Guides and Girl Scouts in 1946. The association has more than 14,500 members of both genders.

Scouting in Costa Rica includes a university-level course on Scouting. the course is part of teacher training program and is intended to introduce future educators to Scouting as an educational method

Scouting in Costa Rica has an emphasis on community service, rural Scouting and nature conservation projects. The association has a National Office and 8 regional offices throughout nine regions of Costa Rica (San José, Central and Northern Alajuela, Heredia, Cartago, Guanacaste, Puntarenas, Brunca, and Limón). Each regional office has a regional executive that links the region to the National Office.

Historic emblem of Asociación de Guías y Scouts de Costa Rica

== Secciones ==
- Manada: desde los 7 años hasta los 10 años.
- Tropa: desde los 11 años hasta los 14 años.
- Wak Tsurí: desde los 15 años hasta los 17 años
- Comunidad: desde los 18 años hasta los 22 años.

== Scout Promise ==
By my honour and with God's help, I promise to do everything possible to obey all my obligations with God and my nation, help my neighbour in all circumstances, and loyally obey the Law of Scouts and Guides.

== Scout and Guide Law ==
1. A Scout shows his honor by being worthy of trust.
2. A Scout is loyal to God, his nation, his parents, his superiors, and his subordinates.
3. A Scout is useful and helps others without thinking of rewards.
4. A Scout is everybody's friend and brother/sister of all Scouts, without distinction of creed, race, nationality, or social class.
5. A Scout is courteous and well mannered.
6. A Scout sees God's work in nature. He or she protects animals and plants.
7. A Scout obeys rationally and does things in an orderly and complete manner.
8. A Scout smiles and sings through difficult times.
9. A Scout is efficient, hard-working, and careful of others' well-being. (The original Spanish phrase, cuidadoso del bien ajeno, can also mean "respectful of others' properties".)
10. A Scout is clean and healthy; pure in his thoughts, words, and actions.
