= Asia-Pacific Scout Region (World Organization of the Scout Movement) =

World Scouting region

- Map of members or potential members of the Asia-Pacific Scout Region; the three countries with no Scouting organization, and those outside the Region, are in grey.
- Owner: World Organization of the Scout Movement
- Headquarters: Makati, Philippines
- Location: Asia Pacific
- Membership: 30 million
- Asia-Pacific Regional Director: Jose Rizal Pangilinan
- Asia-Pacific Region Scout Committee Chairman (2022–2024): Dale Corvera
- Website https://www.scout.org/asia-pacific

The Asia-Pacific Scout Region is one of the five regions of the World Organization of the Scout Movement, with a World Scout Bureau Regional Support Center based in Makati, Philippines. The Asia-Pacific Region services Scouting in the land area of Asia, from Russia, parts of Central Asia, and the bulk of the Pacific Basin, with the exception of the Federated States of Micronesia, the Marshall Islands and Palau, which are under the Interamerican Region by way of the Aloha Council of the Boy Scouts of America.

The Asia-Pacific Scout Region has witnessed the births and rebirths of national Scout organizations since the region was founded in 1969. Starting with ten founding members, it grew to 33 member countries as of 2024, encompassing 35 million Scouts. Eight of the 15 largest Scout associations in the world are in the Region.

For several years, communism and subsequent government repressed Scouting in Afghanistan, where it has returned last 2020, as well as in Mongolia, which had been the first Soviet satellite state since 1924. On the other hand, the World Scout Committee accepted in 2009 the declaration of Gerakan Pramuka Indonesia of having 17 million members for the census 2008. This has directly affected and changed the membership figure in the region, resulting in an increase of 9 million members, which now stands at a total of 24.7 million in 2009.

Widely separated by uneven resources, cultures, ethnic groups and technological resources, Scouting in the Asia-Pacific Region generally has the respect of the public and by governments, a wide array of volunteers encompassing public and private sectors, and is powered by a small group of professionals in the Scouting service.

The current Regional Chairman is Dale Corvera, serving the terms 2022–2025 while the current Regional Director is Jose Rizal Pangilinan. Both are from the Philippines. Hon. Corvera was elected by fellow Committee members to serve as chair following elections for the APR Regional Scout Committee held 16 Feb 2022. He replaced the outgoing Regional Chairman H. E. Ambassador Ahmad Rusdi of Indonesia. His tenure ends in 2025 and the Asia-Pacific Region Scout Committee will re-elect a new chair.

This region is the counterpart of the Asia Pacific Region of the World Association of Girl Guides and Girl Scouts (WAGGGS).

== Members ==
The 33 National Scout Organizations of the Asia-Pacific Region are the following:

Name	NSO Links
Afghanistan National Scout Organization	
Scouts Australia	
Bangladesh Scouts	
Bhutan Scouts	
Persekutuan Pengakap Negara Brunei Darussalam	
Cambodia Scouts	
The General Association of Scouts of China	
Fiji Scouts	
Scout Association of Hong Kong	
Bharat Scouts and Guides	
Gerakan Pramuka Indonesia	
Scout Association of Japan	
Organisation of the Scout Movement of Kazakhstan	
Kiribati Scouts Association	
Korea Scouts Association	
The Scout Association of Macau	
Persekutuan Pengakap Malaysia	
The Scout Association of Maldives	
The Scout Association of Mongolia	
Myanmar Scouts	
Nepal Scouts	
Scouts Aoteoroa	
Pakistan Boy Scouts Association	
The Scout Association of Papua New Guinea	
Boy Scouts of the Philippines	
All-Russian Scout Association	
Singapore Scouts Association	
Solomon Islands Scout Association	
Sri Lanka Scout Association	
Ittihodi Scouthoi Tojikiston	
National Scout Association of Thailand	
União Nacional dos Escuteiros de Timor-Leste	
Pathfinder Scouts Vietnam	

The Asia-Pacific Region contains some countries with no National Scout Organization, each of which are due to political constraints within the countries.

- North Korea
- Laos
- Mainland China

Suncheon Asia-Pacific Scout Centre.

The Asia-Pacific Silver Jubilee Celebration was held at the regional gathering at the 28th World Scout Conference in Senegal.

APRinbox is the monthly e-newsletter of World Scout Bureau/Asia Pacific Region circulated to Scouts and adult leaders in the global community of the Scout Movement, edited by the Asia Pacific Regional Office in Manila, Philippines.

The Suncheon Asia-Pacific Scout Centre (SAPSC) offers programs in English based on the Scout method of "learning by doing" – a hands-on experiential learning process in the outdoors through young leaders from the National Scout Organizations.

In 2023, it was decided to dissolve the Eurasian Region, on 30 September. Kazakhstan, the Russian Federation and Tajikistan joined the Asia-Pacific Region on 1 October, while Ukraine, Moldova, Belarus, Georgia, Armenia, and Azerbaijan joined the European Region.

== Scout Committee and subcommittees ==
The APR Scout Committee shall consist of ten persons from member National Scout Organizations in the Asia-Pacific Region who shall be elected by the conference by secret ballot for a term of six years. The chairman of the committee is the leader of the region, which is elected between the committee members. The current chairperson is Hon. Dale B. Corvera. One of its main functions is to act on behalf of the conference between its meetings and to appoint subcommittees or study committees as may be needed.

For the 2022-2024 Triennial Plan, the six sub-committees are the following: Youth Engagement, Governance, Diversity and Inclusion, Social Impact, Communications and External Relations, and Educational Methods, Last from 2015 to 2018, the sub-committees were: Programme, Adult Support, Management, Financial Resources, Scouting Profile and Foundation Management. All the members are nominated from the member NSOs, with the youth representatives, Regional Youth Representatives, who are elected from the Asia-Pacific Regional Youth Forum.

=== Current Asia-Pacific Region Scout Committee members ===
Post	NSO	Name	Term
Chairman	Philippines	Hon. Dale B Corvera	2018–2025
First Vice Chairman	Korea	Simon Rhee Hang Bock	2022–2028
Second Vice Chairman	Thailand	Somboon Bunyasiri	2018–2025
Member	Australia	Elston Hynd	2018–2025
Member	Bangladesh	Mohammad Rafiqul Islam Khan	2018–2025
Member	Taiwan	Yang, Yung-Chin	2022–2028
Member	Indonesia	Brata Tryana Hardjosubroto	2022–2028
Member	Japan	Hiroshi Shimada	2018–2025
Member	Malaysia	Mohd Zin Bidin	2022–2028
Member	Maldives	Aishath Ahlam	2022–2028
Regional Treasurer	Hong Kong	Paul Ho	2022–2028
Chairperson, Regional Youth Representative	Philippines	Dianne Eden I. Villasis	2022–2025

=== Previous Asia-Pacific Regional Scout Committee members ===
Post	NSO	Name	Term
Chairman	Indonesia	Ahmad Rusdi	2018–2022
Vice-chairman	Japan	Hiroshi Shimada	2018–2024
Vice-chairman	Thailand	Somboon Bunyasiri	2018–2024
Member	Australia	Elston Hynd	2018–2024
Member	Bangladesh	Mohammad Rafiqul Islam Khan	2018–2024
Member	Philippines	Dale Corvera	2018–2024
Member	Maldives	Ahmed Ali Maniku	2018–2022
Member	India	Bhaidas Ishwar Nagarale	2018–2022
Member	Singapore	Chay Hong Leng	2018–2022
Member	Taiwan	Ie-Bin Lian	2018–2022

== Regional Conference and Summit ==
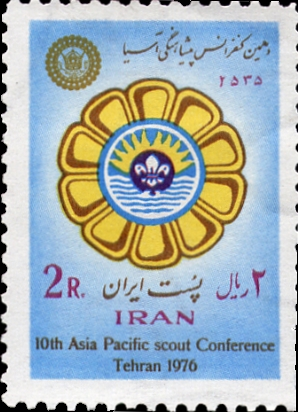

The APR Scout Conference are held every three years as to gather all the NSOs to deal with the major regional problem. It is the toppest governing body of the region. 22 APR Scout Conference was held in Japan in 2007. The 23rd Asia-Pacific Regional Scout Conference held from 27 October to 1 November 2009, in Kuala Lumpur, Malaysia had 440 participants from Asia-Pacific, Africa, Arab, Interamerica, Europe, Eurasia and other organizations. The APR Scout Committee and Sub-committees members are also elected by the conference. The next conference will be held in Taiwan in 2025. Between Conferences there are APR Scout Leaders' Summit. The last Summit was held in Bangkok, Thailand in 2024.

== Regional Youth Forum ==
Fifty-seven participants from 17 countries attended the 2004 Asia-Pacific Region Youth Forum in Brunei Darussalam in December 2004. Six Youth advisors were elected and attended the Regional Committee meetings. The Youth Advisers are Edward Cook, Chairman (New Zealand), Eko Andrianto of Indonesia, Netsai Khaimarn of Thailand, In Sun Ryu of Korea, Maiya Twayanabasu of Nepal, and Aaron Wardle (Australia). They advised on helping to organize and manage the next youth forum.

107 participants from 24 countries attended the 6th Asia-Pacific Region Youth Forum in Kuala Lumpur, Malaysia in October 2009. Seven Young Adult Member Group members were elected and they are assigned to the Regional Committee or Sub-committee. The Young Adult Member Group members are Maeedh Mohamed Zahir of Maldives as the new chairman, Lam Kwok Hei Dicky of Hong Kong, Ari Wijanarko Adipratomo of Indonesia, Seo Ji Eun of Korea, Mohd Hafiz Bin Ariffin of Malaysia, Oliver Lim Zi Kai of Singapore and Krittee Tantivisitkul of Thailand. They advised on helping to organise and manage the next youth forum in Bangladesh in 2012.

During the 2022 APR Online Regional Youth Forum, the following scouts were elected to serve as APR Regional Youth Representatives:

Post	Country	Name	Term
Chairperson	Philippines	Dianne Eden I. Villasis	2022-2025
Member, Youth Engagement Sub-Committee	Maldives	Mohamed Iujaaz Yazeed	2022-2025
Member, Social Impact Sub-Committee	Malaysia	Zairin Adam Bin Abdul Aziz	2022-2025
Member, Diversity & Inclusion Sub-Committee	Bangladesh	Humayra Ibnat Badhon	2022-2025
Member, Governance Sub-Committee	South Korea	Garam Jeon	2022-2025
Member, Communication and Partnerships Sub-Committee	Hong Kong	Ng Koon-Tat Addison	2022-2025
Member, Educational Methods, Sub-Committee	India	Supreeth Balaji	2022-2025

== Award for Outstanding Scouts ==
The project calls for the selection of Outstanding Scouts in the Asia-Pacific Region from among candidates nominated by member NSOs in the region, and the award is to be made at the Asia-Pacific Regional Conferences which are held every three years. This contest started eight years ago at the regional conference in Delhi in 2001, and has become a regular feature of every regional conference. The main purpose of the contest is to enhance the image and visibility of Scouting as an educational movement, and to emphasize its effectiveness in the development of young people at home, in school, and in communities. 5 finalists are invited to attend the Asia-Pacific Regional Conference to be interviewed by a board of judges from among appropriate persons (usually committee members from the Programme Sub-Committee and the Scouting Profile Sub-Committee).

== Regional Rover Moot ==
For older Scouts (traditionally called Rovers or Rover Scouts), the Region has sponsored region-wide Rover Moots. It has not been held already in the Region.

Past Moots include:

- 1st Asia-Pacific (7th Australian) Rover Moot – Yabamac, Victoria – December 1977 – January 1978
- 2nd Asia-Pacific (8th Australian) Rover Moot – BP Park, Samford, Queensland – December 1980 – January 1981
- 3rd Asia-Pacific (4th China) Rover Moot – Yangmingshan, Taipei City Republic of China (Taiwan) – 1982
- 4th Asia-Pacific (9th Australian) Rover Moot – Gowrie Park, Tasmania, Australia – December 1983 – January 1984
- 5th Asia-Pacific Rover Moot – Christchurch, New Zealand – 1984
- 6th Asia-Pacific (11th Australian) Rover Moot – Camp Cotter, Canberra Australian Capital Territory, Australia – December 1989 – January 1990
- 7th Asia-Pacific (12th Australian) Rover Moot – Woodman Point, Perth, Western Australia, Australia – December 1992 – January 1993
- 8th Asia-Pacific (13th Australian) Rover Moot – Cataract Scout Park, Sydney New South Wales, Australia – December 1995 – January 1996
- 9th Asia-Pacific Rover Moot – Bangladesh – 1997
- 10th Asia-Pacific (14th Australian) Rover Moot – Yea, Victoria, Australia – December 1998 – January 1999
- 11th Asia-Pacific (1st Mongolian) Rover Moot – Mongolia – 1999
- 12th Asia-Pacific (15th Australian) Rover Moot – Landsborough, Queensland, Australia – December 2001 – January 2002
- 13th Asia-Pacific (21st Australian) CBR Rover Moot – Canberra, Australian Capital Territory, Australia – December 2019 – January 2020

== See also ==
- Asia-Pacific Scout Jamboree
- U Ba Htay
- U Tin Tun
