= List of prime ministers of Thailand by education =

Last education by Thai prime ministers
Institution	Number of prime ministers
National Defence College of Thailand	8
Law School	3
Ramkhamhaeng University	2
Chulachomklao Royal Military Academy	1
Other institution	3
Institution outside Thailand	15

A bar chart of last education by Thai prime ministers

Institution attended by Thai prime ministers
Institution	Number of prime ministers
Chulachomklao Royal Military Academy	11
Suankularb Wittayalai School	8
National Defence College of Thailand	9
Law School	7
Royal Thai Army General Staff College	6
Amnuay Silpa School	5

A bar chart of top six institution attended by Thai prime ministers

This is a list of prime ministers of Thailand by education.

== List of prime ministers ==
Living

No.	Prime Minister	Term of office		Primary education	Higher education	Refs
1	Manopakorn Nitithada	June 28, 1932	June 21, 1933	• Wat Ratchaburana • Suankularb Wittayalai School • Wat Chakkrawat • Assumption College	• Law School • Middle Temple (United Kingdom)	
2	Phahon Phonphayuhasena	June 21, 1933	December 16, 1938	• Wat Chakkrawat School • Sukhumala Wittayalai School	• Royal Military Academy • Military School, Potsdam (German Empire) • Prussian War College (German Empire) • Copenhagen University College of Engineering (Denmark)	
3	Plaek Phibunsongkhram	December 16, 1938; April 8, 1948	August 1, 1944; September 16, 1957	• Wat Khemapirataram School	• Royal Military Academy • Royal Siamese Artillery School • Royal Siamese Army General Staff College • École militaire (Artillery) (France) • University of Paris (Bachelor of Calculate) (France)	
4	Khuang Aphaiwong	August 1, 1944; January 31, 1946; November 9, 1947	August 31, 1945; March 24, 1946; April 8, 1948	• Debsirin School • Assumption College	• École centrale de Lyon (Bachelor of Engineering) (France)	
5	Tawee Boonyaket	August 31, 1945	September 17, 1945	• Benchamarachuthit Chanthaburi School • Suankularb Wittayalai School • King's College	• University of Cambridge (Bachelor of Agriculture) (United Kingdom) • École nationale supérieure d'Agronomie (Master of Agriculture) (France)	
6	Seni Pramoj	September 17, 1945; February 15, 1975; April 20, 1976	January 31, 1946; March 14, 1975; October 6, 1976	• Rajini School • Assumption College • Debsirin School • Suankularb Wittayalai School • Trent College (United Kingdom)	• University of Oxford (Bachelor of Law) (United Kingdom) • Gray's Inn (United Kingdom) • Law School	
7	Pridi Banomyong	March 24, 1946	August 23, 1946	• Wat Sala Pun School • Matthayom Wat Benchamabophit School • Ayutthaya School • Suankularb Wittayalai School	• Law School • University of Caen (Bachelor and Master of Law) (France) • University of Paris (Doctor of Law and High Vocational Certificate of Political Economics) (France)	
8	Thawan Thamrongnawasawat	August 23, 1946	November 8, 1947	• Ayutthaya School • Chulalongkorn University Pre-School • Debsirin School	• Teacher Education School • Royal Thai Naval Academy • Law School	
9	Pote Sarasin	September 21, 1957	January 1, 1958	• Bangkok Christian College • Wilbraham Academy (United States)	• Law School • Middle Temple (United Kingdom)	
10	Thanom Kittikachorn	January 1, 1958; December 9, 1963; December 18, 1972	October 20, 1958; November 17, 1971; October 14, 1973	• Prachaban Wat Kok Phlu School	• Chulachomklao Royal Military Academy • Royal Thai Survey School • Royal Thai Army Infantry Center • National Defence College of Thailand	
11	Sarit Thanarat	February 9, 1959	December 8, 1963	• Mukdahan School • Wat Mahannapharam School • Infantry School of Bangkok	• Chulachomklao Royal Military Academy	
12	Sanya Dharmasakti	October 14, 1973	February 15, 1975	• Taweethapisek School • Assumption College • Patumkongka School	• Law School • Middle Temple (United Kingdom) • National Defence College of Thailand	
13	Kukrit Pramoj	March 14, 1975	April 20, 1976	• Wattana Wittaya Academy • Suankularb Wittayalai School • Trent College (United Kingdom)	• University of Oxford (Bachelor and Master of Philosophy, Politics and Economics) (United Kingdom)	
14	Thanin Kraivichien	October 8, 1976	October 20, 1977	• Suankularb Wittayalai School	• University of Moral and Political Sciences (Bachelor of Law) • London School of Economics (Master of Law) (United Kingdom) • Gray's Inn (United Kingdom)	
15	Kriangsak Chamanan	November 11, 1977	March 3, 1980	• Samut Sakhon Wittayalai School • Patumkongka School • Amnuay Silpa School	• Chulachomklao Royal Military Academy • Royal Thai Army General Staff College • Royal Thai Army Cavalry School • United States Army Command and General Staff College (United States) • National Defence College of Thailand	
16	Prem Tinsulanonda	March 3, 1980	August 4, 1988	• Wat Bo Yang School • Mahavajiravudh Songkhla School • Suankularb Wittayalai School	• Royal Thai Army Technical School • Royal Thai Army Cavalry School • United States Army Armor School (United States) • Royal Thai Army War College • National Defence College of Thailand	
17	Chatichai Choonhavan	August 4, 1988	February 23, 1991	• Benjamarachutit Ratchaburi School • Debsirin School • Amnuay Silpa School	• Chulachomklao Royal Military Academy • Royal Thai Army Cavalry School • Royal Thai Army Armoured School • United States Army Armor School (United States)	
18	Anand Panyarachun	March 2, 1991; June 10, 1992	April 7, 1992; September 23, 1992	• Amnuay Silpa School • Bangkok Christian College • Dulwich College (United Kingdom)	• University of Cambridge (Bachelor of Law) (United Kingdom) • Law School	
19	Suchinda Kraprayoon	April 7, 1992	May 24, 1992	• Piyawitthaya School • Taweethapisek School • Wat Rajabopit School • Amnuay Silpa School • Pre-Medical School, Chulalongkorn University • Armed Forces Academies Preparatory School	• Chulachomklao Royal Military Academy • Royal Thai Army General Staff College • United States Army Command and General Staff College (United States)	
20	Chuan Leekpai	September 23, 1992; November 9, 1997	July 13, 1995; February 9, 2001	• Mattayomwatkhuanvisesmulanithi School • College of Fine Arts	• Thammasat University (Bachelor of Law) • Law School of the Thai Bar • Silpakorn University (Doctor of Literature)	
21	Banharn Silpa-archa	July 13, 1995	November 25, 1996	• Watthanasil Witthayalai School	• Ramkhamhaeng University (Bachelor and Master of Law)	
22	Chavalit Yongchaiyudh	November 25, 1996	November 9, 1997	• Amnuay Silpa School • Triam Udom Suksa School	• Chulachomklao Royal Military Academy • Royal Thai Army Signal School • Royal Thai Army General Staff College • United States Army Command and General Staff College (United States) • United States Army Airborne School (United States)	
23	Thaksin Shinawatra	February 9, 2001	September 19, 2006	• Montfort College • Armed Forces Academies Preparatory School	• Royal Thai Police Academy • Eastern Kentucky University (Master of Criminal Justice) (United States) • Sam Houston State University (Doctor of Criminal Justice) (United States)	
24	Surayud Chulanont	October 1, 2006	January 29, 2008	• St.Francis Xavier Convent School • Saint Gabriel's College • Suankularb Wittayalai School • Armed Forces Academies Preparatory School	• Chulachomklao Royal Military Academy • Royal Thai Army General Staff College • United States Army Command and General Staff College (United States) • United States Department of the Interior (Resources Management) (United States) • National Defence College of Thailand	
25	Samak Sundaravej	January 29, 2008	September 9, 2008	• Satri Bangkhunphrom School • Deves Suksa School • Saint Gabriel's College • Assumption Commercial College	• Thammasat University (Bachelor of Law) • Chulalongkorn University (Certificate of Tour Guide)	
26	Somchai Wongsawat	September 18, 2008	December 2, 2008	• Amnuay Silpa School	• Thammasat University (Bachelor of Law) • Law School of the Thai Bar • National Defence College of Thailand • National Institute of Development Administration (Master of Public Administration)	
27	Abhisit Vejjajiva	December 17, 2008	August 5, 2011	• Anuban Yukhonthon School • Chulalongkorn University Demonstration Elementary School • Scaitcliffe (United Kingdom) • Eton College (United Kingdom)	• University of Oxford (Bachelor of Philosophy, Politics and Economics and Master of Economics) (United Kingdom) • Ramkhamhaeng University (Bachelor of Law)	
28	Yingluck Shinawatra	August 5, 2011	May 7, 2014	• Regina Coeli College • Yupparaj Wittayalai School	• Chiang Mai University (Bachelor of Political Science) • Kentucky State University (Master of Public Administration) (United States)	
29	Prayut Chan-o-cha	August 24, 2014	August 22, 2023	• Sahakitwitthaya School • Pibulwitthayalai School • Wat Nuannoradit School • Armed Forces Academies Preparatory School	• Chulachomklao Royal Military Academy • Royal Thai Army General Staff College • National Defence College of Thailand	
30	Srettha Thavisin	August 22, 2023	August 14, 2024	• Prasarnmit Demonstration School, Srinakharinwirot University (Elementary) • Prasarnmit Demonstration School, Srinakharinwirot University (Secondary)	• University of Massachusetts (Bachelor of Economics) (United States) • Claremont Graduate University (Master of Finance) (United States)	
31	Paetongtarn Shinawatra	August 16, 2024	August 21, 2025	• Saint Joseph Convent School • Mater Dei School	• Chulalongkorn University (Bachelor of Arts in Political Science) • University of Surrey (Master of Science) (United Kingdom) • National Defence College of Thailand	
32	Anutin Charnvirakul	September 7, 2025		• Assumption College • Worcester Academy (United States)	• Hofstra University (Bachelor of Engineering) (United States) • Thammasat University (Mini MBA Certificate) • National Defence College of Thailand	

=== Acting prime ministers ===
Living

Prime Minister	Term of office		Primary education	Higher education	Refs
Phin Choonhavan	November 8, 1947	November 9, 1947	• Army Non Commissioned Officer School	• Chulachomklao Royal Military Academy	
Sarit Thanarat	September 16, 1957; October 20, 1958	September 21, 1957; February 9, 1959	• Mukdahan School • Wat Mahannapharam School • Infantry School of Bangkok	• Chulachomklao Royal Military Academy	
Thanom Kittikachorn	November 17, 1971	December 18, 1972	• Prachaban Wat Kok Phlu School	• Chulachomklao Royal Military Academy • Royal Thai Survey School • Royal Thai Army Infantry Center • National Defence College of Thailand	
Sangad Chaloryu	October 6, 1976; October 20, 1977	October 8, 1976; November 11, 1977	• Chainatpittayakom School • Uthaiwitthayakhom School • Demonstration School of Bansomdejchaopraya Rajabhat University	• Royal Thai Naval Academy • National Defence College of Thailand • Naval War College	
Sunthorn Kongsompong	February 23, 1991	March 2, 1991	• Suankularb Wittayalai School	• Chulachomklao Royal Military Academy	
Meechai Ruchuphan	May 24, 1992	June 10, 1992	• Wattana Wittaya Academy	• Thammasat University (Bachelor of Laws) • Southern Methodist University (Master of Laws) (United States)	
Sonthi Boonyaratglin	September 19, 2006	October 1, 2006	• Wat Phrasri Mahadhat Secondary Demonstration School, Phranakhon Rajabhat University • Armed Forces Academies Preparatory School	• Chulachomklao Royal Military Academy • Command and General Staff College (Master of Arts) • National Defence College of Thailand • Ramkhamhaeng University (Doctor of Philosophy)	
Somchai Wongsawat	September 9, 2008	September 18, 2008	• Amnuay Silpa School	• Thammasat University (Bachelor of Law) • Law School of the Thai Bar • National Defence College of Thailand • National Institute of Development Administration (Master of Public Administration)	
Chavarat Charnvirakul	December 3, 2008	December 17, 2008	• Assumption College	• Thammasat University (Bachelor of Economics) • National Defence College of Thailand	
Niwatthamrong Boonsongpaisan	May 7, 2014	May 22, 2014		• Srinakharinwirot University (Bachelor of Education)	
Prayut Chan-o-cha	May 22, 2014	August 24, 2014	• Sahakitwitthaya School • Pibulwitthayalai School • Wat Nuannoradit School • Armed Forces Academies Preparatory School	• Chulachomklao Royal Military Academy • Royal Thai Army General Staff College • National Defence College of Thailand	
Prawit Wongsuwon	August 24, 2022	September 30, 2022	• Saint Gabriel's College • Armed Forces Academies Preparatory School	• Chulachomklao Royal Military Academy • Royal Thai Army General Staff College • National Defence College of Thailand	
Phumtham Wechayachai	August 14, 2024; July 3, 2025	August 16, 2024September 7, 2025	• Taweethapisek School	• Chulalongkorn University (Bachelor of Political Science and Master of Political Science) • National Defence College of Thailand	
Suriya Juangroongruangkit	July 1, 2025	July 3, 2025	• Saint John's School • Triam Udom Suksa School	• Mahidol University • University of California, Berkeley (Bachelor of Engineering) (United States) • National Defence College of Thailand	

== List of multilingual prime minister of Thailand ==
Of the 29 persons who have served as prime minister of Thailand, at least third-quarter have displayed proficiency in speaking or writing a language other than Central Thai. Of these, eight of them also public image as Central Thai with other languages as compound bilingual. During the Cold War, Thai education was compelled to study English from the first grade to the twelve grade, Isan language also common in Thai media make most of recently Thai prime minister able to listen and read both in English and Isan shy to speak.

Prime minister		Teochew	Southern Thai	Northern Thai	Isan/Lao	Khmer	English	Other languages
1	Kon Hutasingha	Native	Listen only	Listen only	Listen only		Partial	
2	Phot Phahonyothin	Partial	Listen only	Listen only	Listen only		Partial	Fluent - German
2	Phot Phahonyothin	Partial	Listen only	Listen only	Listen only		Partial	Partial - Danish
3	Plaek Phibunsongkhram		Listen only	Listen only	Listen only		Partial	Fluent - French
3	Plaek Phibunsongkhram		Listen only	Listen only	Listen only		Partial	Partial - Japanese
4	Khuang Aphaiwong		Listen only	Listen only	Listen only	Fluent	Partial	Fluent - French
5	Thawi Bunyaket		Native	Listen only	Listen only		Fluent	Partial - French
6	Seni Pramoj		Listen only	Listen only	Listen only		Fluent	
7	Pridi Banomyong	Partial	Listen only	Listen only	Listen only		Partial	Fluent - French
7	Pridi Banomyong	Partial	Listen only	Listen only	Listen only		Partial	Partial - Mandarin
8	Thawan Thamrongnawasawat	Partial	Listen only	Listen only	Listen only		Partial	
9	Pote Sarasin		Listen only	Listen only	Listen only		Fluent	Partial - Hainanese
10	Thanom Kittikachorn		Listen only	Native	Listen only		Listen only	
11	Sarit Thanarat		Listen only	Listen only	Partial	Reading only	Listen only	
12	Sanya Dharmasakti		Listen only	Listen only	Listen only		Partial	
13	Kukrit Pramoj		Listen only	Listen only	Listen only		Fluent	
14	Thanin Kraivichien	Partial	Listen only	Listen only	Listen only		Partial	Partial - Danish
15	Kriangsak Chamanan	Fluent	Listen only	Listen only	Listen only		Partial	
16	Prem Tinsulanonda		Native	Listen only	Partial		Partial	
17	Chatichai Choonhavan	Fluent	Listen only	Listen only	Listen only		Partial	Listen only - Shan
17	Chatichai Choonhavan	Fluent	Listen only	Listen only	Listen only		Partial	Partial - Spanish
18	Anand Panyarachun		Listen only	Listen only	Listen only		Fluent	Partial - Hakka
19	Suchinda Kraprayoon		Listen only	Listen only	Partial		Partial	
20	Chuan Leekpai	Partial	Native	Listen only	Listen only		Listen only	
21	Banharn Silpa-archa	Native	Listen only	Listen only	Listen only		Listen only	
22	Chavalit Yongchaiyudh		Listen only	Listen only	Listen only		Partial	
23	Thaksin Shinawatra		Listen only	Native	Listen only	Listen only	Partial	Partial - Hakka
23	Thaksin Shinawatra		Listen only	Native	Listen only	Listen only	Partial	Listen only - Arabic
24	Surayud Chulanont		Listen only	Listen only	Partial		Partial	
25	Samak Sundaravej	Partial	Listen only	Listen only	Listen only		Partial	
26	Somchai Wongsawat		Native	Partial	Listen only		Listen only	
27	Abhisit Vejjajiva		Listen only	Listen only	Listen only		Fluent	
28	Yingluck Shinawatra		Listen only	Native	Listen only		Partial	Partial - Hakka
28	Yingluck Shinawatra		Listen only	Native	Listen only		Partial	Listen only - Arabic
29	Prayut Chan-o-cha		Listen only	Listen only	Partial		Listen only	
30	Srettha Thavisin		Listen only	Listen only	Listen only		Partial	
31	Paetongtarn Shinawatra		Listen only	Partial	Listen only		Fluent	

Acting prime minister		Teochew	Southern Thai	Northern Thai	Isan/Lao	Khmer	English	Other languages
1	Phin Choonhavan		Listen only	Listen only	Partial		Partial	Listen only - Shan
2	Sangad Chaloryu		Listen only	Listen only	Listen only		Partial	Listen only - Korean
3	Sunthorn Kongsompong		Listen only	Listen only	Listen only		Partial	Listen only - Korean
3	Sunthorn Kongsompong		Listen only	Listen only	Listen only		Partial	Listen only - Vietnamese
4	Meechai Ruchuphan		Listen only	Listen only	Listen only		Fluent	
5	Sonthi Boonyaratglin		Listen only	Listen only	Listen only		Partial	Partial - Pattani Malay
5	Sonthi Boonyaratglin		Listen only	Listen only	Listen only		Partial	Listen only - Arabic
5	Sonthi Boonyaratglin		Listen only	Listen only	Listen only		Partial	Listen only - Vietnamese
6	Chavarat Charnvirakul		Listen only	Listen only	Listen only		Partial	Native - Cantonese
7	Niwatthamrong Boonsongpaisan		Listen only	Listen only	Listen only		Fluent	
8	Prawit Wongsuwon		Listen only	Listen only	Listen only		Partial	Listen only - Vietnamese
9	Phumtham Wechayachai		Listen only	Listen only	Listen only		Partial	
10	Suriya Juangroongruangkit		Listen only	Listen only	Listen only		Fluent	Native - Hokkien

== See also ==
- List of prime ministers of Thailand
