= Scouting in Mongolia =

The Scout and Guide movement in Mongolia is served by:

- Girl Scout Association of Mongolia, member of the World Association of Girl Guides and Girl Scouts
- Mongolyn Skautyn Kholboo, member of the World Organization of the Scout Movement

In addition, there are USA Girl Scouts Overseas in Ulaanbaatar, serviced by way of USAGSO headquarters in New York City.
