= National Scout Organization of Thailand =

Youth organization

- Headquarters: Chonburi
- Location: 60/38 Sukhumvit Rd., Si Racha, Chonburi, Thailand 20110
- Country: Thailand
- Founded: July 1, 1911
- Founder: King Vajiravudh
- Membership: 828,248
- Chief Scout: King of Thailand
- Affiliation: World Organization of the Scout Movement
- Website www.scoutthailand.org

The National Scout Organization of Thailand (NSOT; Thai: คณะลูกเสือแห่งชาติ, RTGS: Khana Luk Suea Haeng Chat), informally known as the Luk Suea (Thai: ลูกเสือ, lit. "Tiger Cubs"), is the national Scouting organization of Thailand. Scouting was founded in Thailand in 1911 and was among the charter members of the World Organization of the Scout Movement in 1922. It is currently regulated by the Scouting Act, B.E. 2551 (2008). The organization has 828,248 members (as of 2013) and is open to boys and girls.

== Early history ==
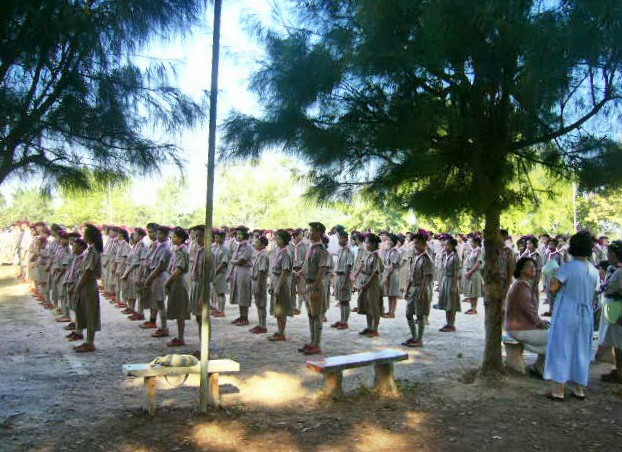
A gathering of Thai Scouts at Na Wa High School, Nakhon Phanom province

Scouting was first introduced in Thailand as a branch of the Wild Tiger Corps on July 1, 1911 by King Vajiravudh (Rama VI), who is known as the Father of Thai Scouting. Thailand claims to be the third country in the world to establish Scouting, but it was more likely fourth. Vajiravudh brought back the idea of Scouting from Great Britain where he studied.

Abhai Chandavimol served on the World Scout Committee of the World Organization of the Scout Movement from 1965 to 1971. Five Thais have been honored with the Bronze Wolf, the highest distinction of the World Organization of the Scout Movement, awarded for exceptional services to Scouting. Recipients and the year they received the Bronze Wolf are: Abhai Chandavimol (1971), Chitra Dansuputra (1976), Kong Visudharomn (1980), Bhethai Amatayakul (1984), and King Bhumibol Adulyadej (2006).

== Scouting and schools ==
Although Scouting is part of the school program, especially for grades 6-8, it is not actually mandatory. Options do exist for participation in other youth programs, such as the Thai Red Cross; however, the vast majority of Thai youth participate in Scouting. Scouts wear their Scout uniforms to school once a week, though which day of the week is set by the local schools.

== Programs ==
Thai youth are normally placed in a Scouting program based on the school grade they are in, not their age. These are also open to both boys and girls.

Program	Grade	Ages
Cub Scouts	1-3	7-9
Scouts	4-6	10-12
Senior Scouts	7-9	13-15
Rover Scouts	10 to young adults	16-25
Sea Scouts	10 to young adults	16-25
Air Scouts	10 to young adults	16-25

Sea Scouts are supported by the Royal Thai Navy and Air Scouts by the Royal Thai Air Force.

== Scout ideals and methods ==
Colours of the National Scout Organization of Thailand

Colours of Thai Provincial Scout

- Chief Scout: King of Thailand
- King's Scout: this award is available to Senior Scouts and is the Thai equivalent of the Eagle Scout award in American Scouting.
- Scout Motto: "Don't lose your faith even if you lose your life" (เสียชีพอย่าเสียสัตย์; RTGS: Sia chip ya sia sat)
- National Scout Day: July 1
- The membership badge of The National Scout Organization of Thailand features the head of a tiger. The country is within the tiger's range. The badge also carries the Scout Motto.

== Major events ==
Event	Year
3rd Asia Pacific Scout Conference	1963
33rd World Scout Conference	1993
38th Asia Pacific Basic Management Course	1994
1st Asia Pacific Scout Camp & Hostel Management Workshop	1996
Asia-Pacific Seminar for Adult Resources Committee Chairmen & Executives	2001
20th World Scout Jamboree in Sattahip, Chonburi Province	28 December 2002 - 7 January 2003
4th ASEAN Scout Jamboree in Si Racha, Chonburi Province	27 November 2013 - 4 December 2013

== See also ==
- Girl Guides Association of Thailand
- Amphoe Bang Khonthi
- World Buddhist Scout Brotherhood
- Yongyudh Vajaradul
