= Abhai Chandavimol =

Thai minister of education

- อภัย จันทวิมล
- Abhai Chandavimol at the Grand Palace

Minister of Education
- In office 14 October 1973 – 22 May 1974
- Prime Minister: Sanya Dharmasakti
- Succeeded by: Kriang Kiratikorn
- In office 18 December 1972 – 14 October 1973
- Prime Minister: Thanom Kittikachorn
- Preceded by: Sukit Nimmanhemin

Personal details
- Born: 16 February 1907 Chanthaburi, Thailand
- Died: 16 April 1993 (aged 86) Bangkok, Thailand
- Spouse: Thongkond Chandavimol
- Education: University of Cambridge
- Profession: Educator

Abhai Chandavimol (Thai: อภัย จันทวิมล1907-1993), the Thai Minister of Education served on the World Scout Committee of the World Organization of the Scout Movement from 1965 to 1971, representing The National Scout Organization of Thailand.

In 1971, Chandavimol was awarded the Bronze Wolf, the only distinction of the World Organization of the Scout Movement, awarded by the World Scout Committee for exceptional services to world Scouting, at the 22nd World Scout Conference.

== Honour ==
received the following royal decorations in the Honours System of Thailand:

- 1967 - Knight Grand Cordon of the Most Exalted Order of the White Elephant
- 1963 - Knight Grand Cordon of the Most Noble Order of the Crown of Thailand
- 1965 - Knight Grand Commander of the Most Illustrious Order of Chula Chom Klao
- 1988 - Member of the Order of Ramkeerati
- 1941 - Medal for Service Rendered in the Interior (Indochina)
- 1962 - Border Service Medal
- 1951 - Chakrabarti Mala Medal
- 1971 - King Rama IX Royal Cypher Medal, 3rd Class
- 1957 - Red Cross Medal of Appreciation, First Class (Gold Medal)
