= Navaminda Kasatriyadhiraj Royal Thai Air Force Academy =

Military Academy under the provision of the Royal Thai Air Force in Saraburi, Thailand

Navaminda Kasatriyadhiraj Royal Air Force Academy
- โรงเรียนนายเรืออากาศนวมินทกษัตริยาธิราช
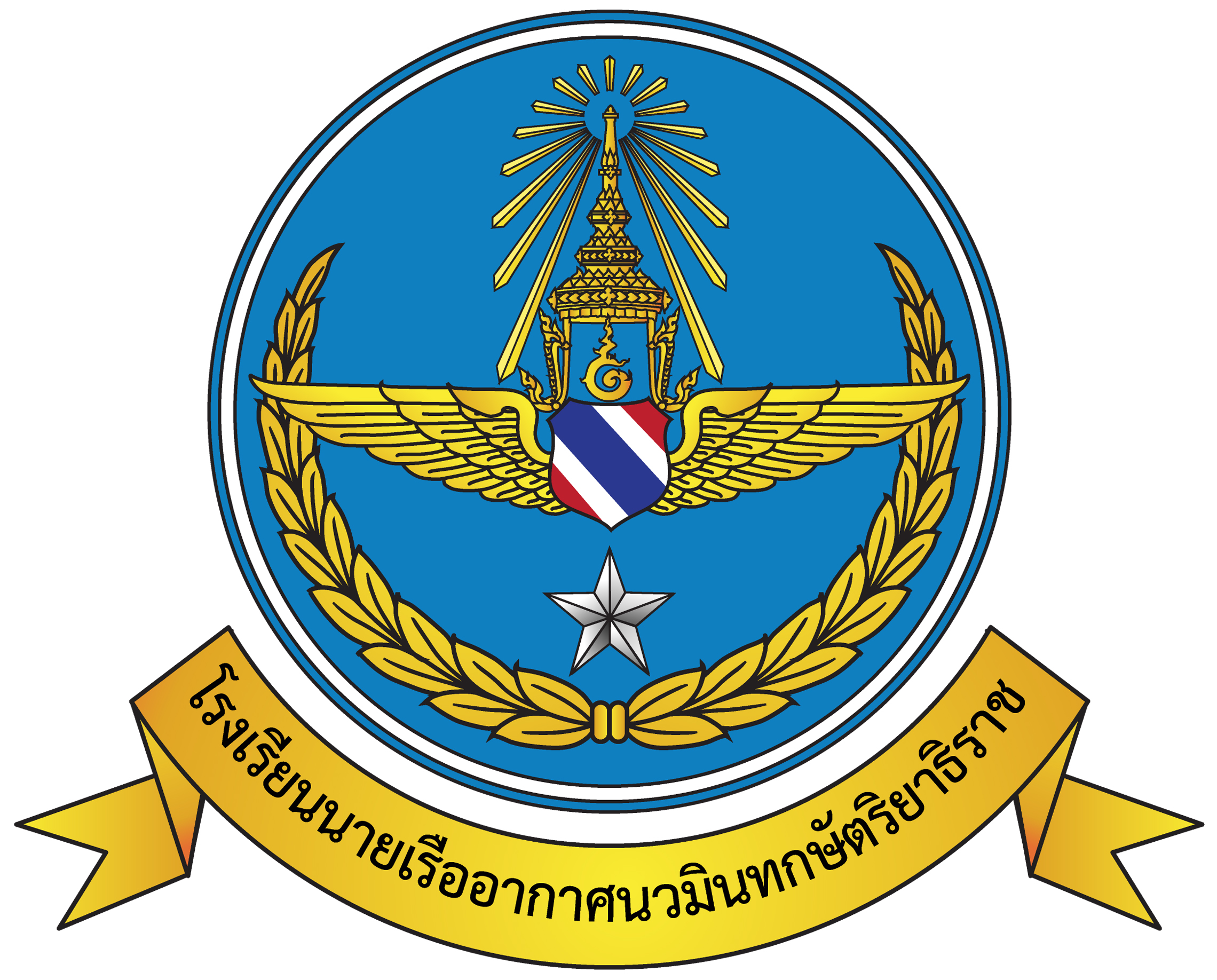
- Type: Air force academy
- Established: 1953
- Founder: Fuen Ronnaphagrad Ritthakhanee
- Affiliations: Thailand
- Location: Saraburi, Thailand; 13.9206°N 100.6256°E
- Website: Official website

The Navaminda Kasatriyadhiraj Royal Air Force Academy (Thai: โรงเรียนนายเรืออากาศนวมินทกษัตริยาธิราช) (NKRAFA) is a military academy for officer cadets of the Royal Thai Air Force.

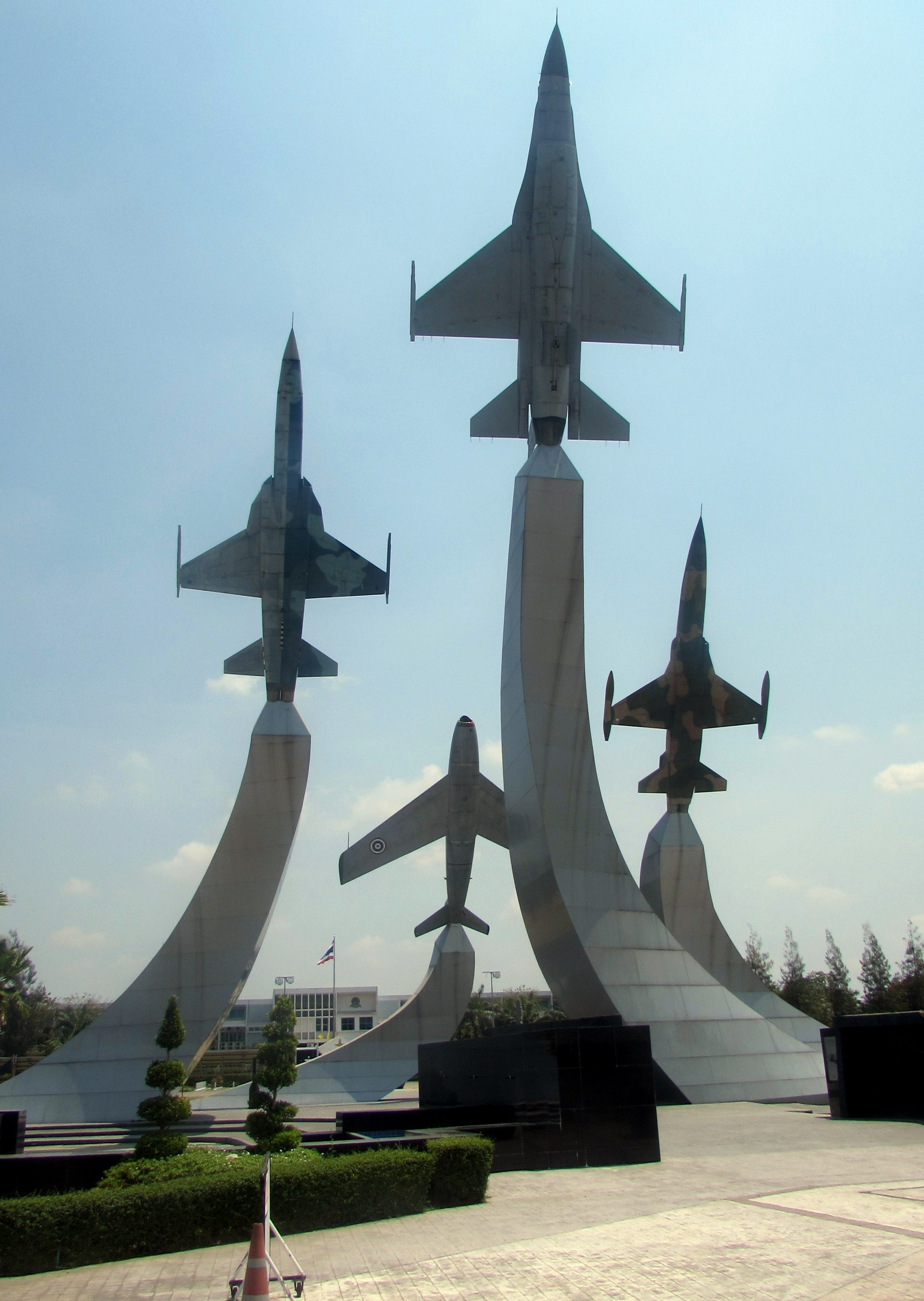
"Fighters on a Stick" at the Royal Air Force Academy grounds. Clockwise starting from the top, an F-16 Fighting Falcon, F-5A Freedom Fighter, F-86 Sabre and F-5E Tiger II.Now at Royal Thai Aviation park, Don Mueang

== History ==
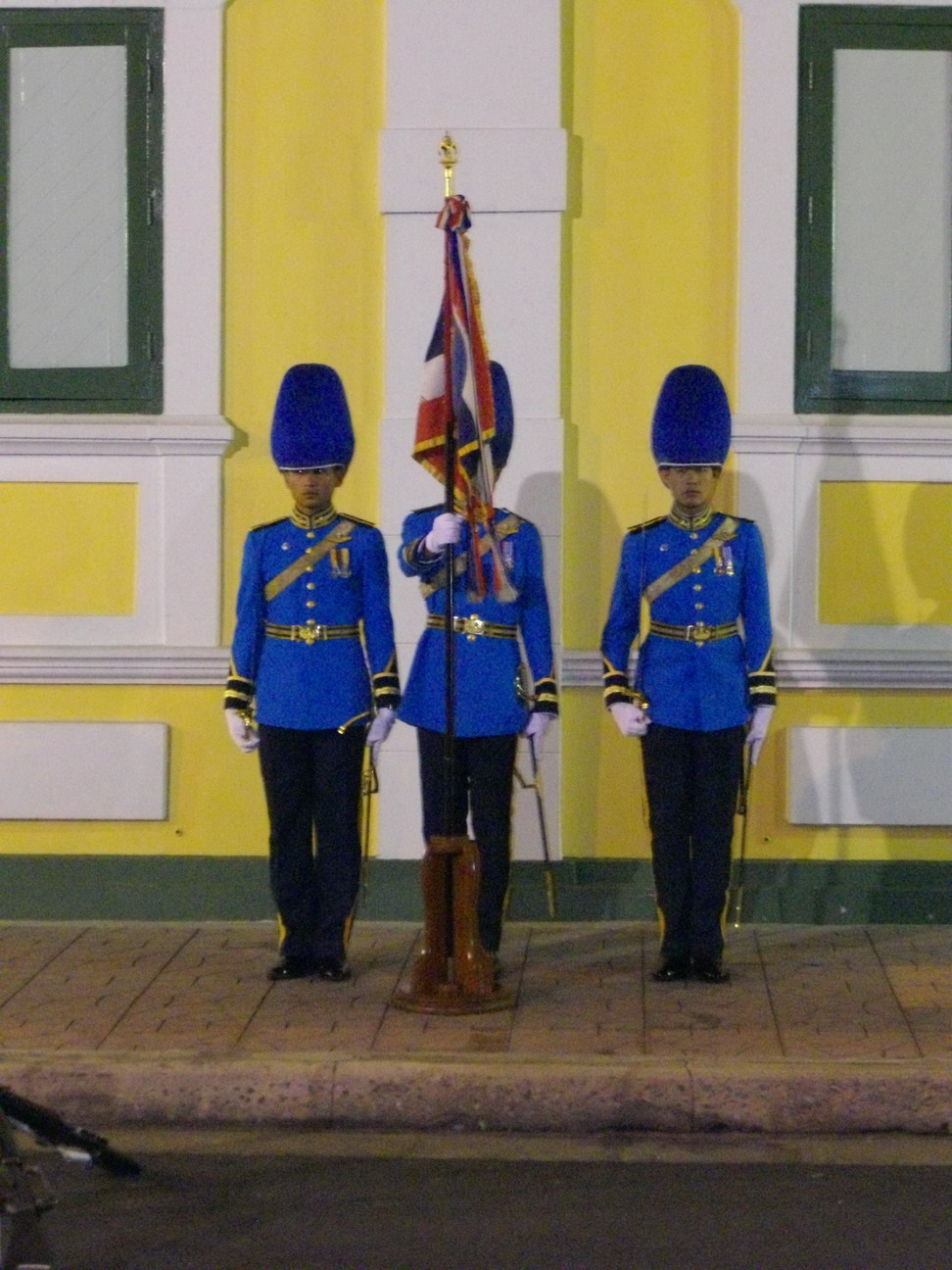
Regimental colours and its guards of Royal Thai Air Force cadets

In 1950, the Royal Air Force (RTAF) started recruiting officers who completed their training from other institutions to work in the air force. Over time, as the number of military operations increased, the air force saw a need to build an air force academy to specifically train new cadets. In the same year, the Directorate of Education and Training of the RTAF proposed to the commander for the creation of such an academy and this was approved by the cabinet on 14 November 1952. The academy was officially opened on 7 May 1953 as the Royal Thai Air Force Academy, with the first intake of 30 cadets. The academy was then moved to its current location on 24 June 1963 near Don Muang Royal Thai Air Force Base. In 2013, King Bhumibol Adulyadej renamed the academy as the Navaminda Kasatriyadhiraj Royal Air Force Academy, in commemoration of the academy's 60th year.

In 2017, Royal Thai Air Force proceeds to build a new Royal Air Force Academy at Muak Lek District, Saraburi Province with a budget of 5 billion baht due to the old location that is cramped. The new air force academy has its own airport to support the CT-4 training plane, able to connect with Wing 1 Nakhon Ratchasima, Wing 2 Lopburi and Wing 6 Don Mueang, as well as installing modern aviation equipment and technology to supports digital networking bypassing the environmental impact survey and comparative studies with leading international air academy overseas in order to produce quality military officers. The academy completed a construction in 2020 and open for teaching and learning for air cadet in 2023 onwards.

Navaminda Kasatriyadhiraj Royal Thai Air Force Academy has moved to a new location at Muak Lek District, Saraburi Province since May 29, 2023.

== Curriculum ==
- Bachelor of Engineering
  - Electrical engineering
  - Civil engineering
  - Industrial engineering and Aviation management
  - Mechanical engineering
  - Aerospace engineering
- Bachelor of Science
  - Computer science
  - Military and Aerospace Materials

== Air Force Cadet Regiment, King's Guard ==
- 1st Cadet Battalion, Air Cadet Regiment, King's Guard, Navaminda Kasatriyadhiraj Royal Air Force Academy
- 2nd Cadet Battalion, Air Cadet Regiment, King's Guard, Navaminda Kasatriyadhiraj Royal Air Force Academy
- 3rd Cadet Battalion, Air Cadet Regiment, King's Guard, Navaminda Kasatriyadhiraj Royal Air Force Academy
- 4th Cadet Battalion, Air Cadet Regiment, King's Guard, Navaminda Kasatriyadhiraj Royal Air Force Academy
- 5th Cadet Battalion, Air Cadet Regiment, King's Guard, Navaminda Kasatriyadhiraj Royal Air Force Academy

== See also ==
- Chulachomklao Royal Military Academy
- Royal Thai Naval Academy
- Armed Forces Academies Preparatory School
- National Defence College of Thailand
