= World Buddhist Scout Council =

- Headquarters: Seoul, South Korea
- Country: International
- Founder: Yongyudh Vajaradul
- Secretary General: Tony Malone

The World Buddhist Scout Council (WSBC) formerly the World Buddhist Scout Brotherhood until 2009 is an autonomous, international body committed to promoting and supporting Buddhism within Scouting. The WBSB began as a means to facilitate religious activities among Buddhist Scouts. The WBSC was declared active with the election of its chairman on July 21, 2004, and received consultative status with the World Scout Committee at the WSC meeting on March 9, 2009. The World Scout Committee's guidelines indicate that at least three years is required to fulfill the requirements before consultative status may be granted.

In 2016 the gender equality of the organisation name was considered and updated to be more inclusive, becoming the World Buddhist Scout Council.

The world jamboree in 2019 was another success with Buddhist scouts both attending and operating exhibitions on Buddhism and collaboration with other faiths in the area of shared spirituality. The Dalai Lama sent a personal blessing to all scouts there.

== Objectives ==
The official objectives of WBSC are:

- To develop and promote the spirit of community and understanding among Scouts of the Buddhist faith.
- To develop an education curriculum that should enhance the spiritual dimension in the personalities of young Buddhists in accordance with the purpose, principles and method of the Scout Movement.
- To promote relations between Scouting and local Buddhists.
- To introduce Scouting in such states or areas where Buddhism is established.
- To co-ordinate the activities of WBSC with non-Scout Organizations having parallel objectives.
- To motivate co-operation among WBSC members.
- To motivate and promote Scouting among Buddhist boys and girls on a global basis.
- To promote contacts, exchanges and interactions with the Scouts of other faiths.
- To foster inter-religious peace dialogue.

== Membership ==
Members of the WBSC include Brazil, Bhutan, France, Hong Kong, Japan, Mongolia, Norway, Republic of China (Taiwan), Singapore, Sri Lanka, South Korea, Thailand, the United States and the United Kingdom.

== Activities ==
=== 2007 ===
At the 21st World Scout Jamboree at Hylands Park in the UK, the WBSB ran the Buddhist Tent in the Faith and Belief Zone (FAB). A large statue of the Buddha, a gift from the National Scout Organization of Thailand to celebrate the Centenary of Scouting and the 80th birthday of King Bhumibol Adulyadej of Thailand. The statue is named Prabuddha Prathanporn Loka-satawassa-nusorn and now sits in the Buddha Sala at Gilwell Park in London and replaces the statue given to the Scout Association in 1967.

The activities included making an origami Lotus, making prayer flags, sewing Buddhist neckerchiefs and meditating. On Sunrise Day, a Buddhist celebration on one of the subcamp stages was attended by over 1000 Scouts. As well as Lama Gankhuyag Magsarjav representing Vajrayana Buddhism, Ven. Ming Kuang from Taiwan represented Mahayana Buddhism and Ven. Chao Khun Bhavanaviteht (Luangpor Khemadhammo) OBE represented Theravada Buddhism. The Heart Sutra was read in Chinese and Tibetan and talks on Buddhism were given and translated into French.

=== 2008 ===
WBSB members from the United Kingdom ran the Buddhist tent in the Faith and Belief Zone at the National Irish Jamboree. Scouts made prayer flags, incense sticks, sand mandalas and practiced meditation.

=== 2009 ===
WBSB members from Mongolia and the United Kingdom organised a service project for the UK Scout Network and Mongolian Rover Scouts at the Manzushir Khiid (Манзушир Хийд) temple in the town of Dzuunmod which is 43 km south of Ulaanbaatar. The temple replaces the large monastery of the same name which was destroyed by the Mongolian communist government in 1937. 82 Scouts spent a week repainting the temple and a large sum of money was also donated to the temple to help improve the facilities.

=== 2019 ===
WSBC Members work with the World Scout Jamboree team in North America to delivery a space on Buddhism, contributed to a shared journey of spirituality space and also were key in the running of an LGBT+ safe space for young people and adults being developed.

=== 2022 ===
The World Buddhist Scout Council Conference took place on 26 February 2022. New elections were held appointing Dr Tony Malone of the UK as the new secretary general, the new council now meets every two months to continue the work in youth development.

== See also ==
- Religion in Scouting
