= Girl Guides Association of Thailand =

The Girl Guides Association of Thailand
- สมาคมผู้บำเพ็ญประโยชน์แห่งประเทศไทย ในพระบรมราชินูปถัมภ์
- Location: Thailand
- Country: Thailand
- Founded: 1957
- Membership: 28,030
- President: Kanchana Termprayoon
- Affiliation: World Association of Girl Guides and Girl Scouts
- Website ggat.org

The Girl Guides Association of Thailand (GGAT) (Thai: สมาคมผู้บำเพ็ญประโยชน์แห่งประเทศไทย ในพระบรมราชินูปถัมภ์) is the national Guiding organization of Thailand. It served 28,030 members (as of 2003). Founded in 1957, the girls-only organization became a full member of the World Association of Girl Guides and Girl Scouts in 1963.

== Program ==
=== Sections ===
The association is divided in four sections according to age:

- Littlebirds – ages 4 to 6
- Bluebirds – ages 7 to 11
- Guides – ages 12 to 15
- Senior Guides – ages 16 to 20.

=== Guide Promise ===
On my honour I promise:

- To do my duty to my country, my religion and the King;
- To help other people at all times;
- To obey the Guide Law.

=== Guide Law ===
1. A Guide's honour is to be trusted.
2. A Guide is loyal.
3. A Guide's duty is to be useful and to help others.
4. A Guide is a friend to all and a sister to every other Guide.
5. A Guide is courteous.
6. A Guide is a friend to animals.
7. A Guide obeys orders.
8. A Guide smiles and sings under all difficulties.
9. A Guide is thrifty.
10. A Guide is pure in thought, word and deed.

== Emblems ==
badge of Bluebirds

== See also ==
- The National Scout Organization of Thailand
