= Bhutan Scouts Association =

Scouting association in Bhutan

- འབྲུག་ཨིསི་ཀའུཊ་ཚོགས་པ་
- Country: Bhutan
- Founded: 1970
- Membership: 18,170
- President: Lyonpo Thakur Singh Powdyel
- Chief Commissioner: Chencho Dorji
- Affiliation: World Organization of the Scout Movement
- Website bhutanscouts.bt

The Bhutan Scouts Association, also known as Druk Scout Tshogpa (Dzongkha:འབྲུག་ཨིསི་ཀའུཊ་ཚོགས་པ་), is a coeducational organization that is part of the World Organization of the Scout Movement. As of 2021, it has a membership of 76,876 members. The association is committed to the education of young people through a value system based on the Scout Promise and Law, with the aim of building a better world where individuals are self-fulfilled and play a constructive role in society.

The membership badge of Bhutan Scout Tshogpa incorporates the color scheme of the flag of Bhutan, and the fleur-de-lis is wrapped in a khata, the traditional ceremonial scarf. The Scout Motto in Dzongkha is གྲ་འགྲིག་འབད་ གྲ་འགྲིག་འབད་,Dra drig Bay.

== History ==
Scouting was first introduced in Bhutan in 1970. In July 1999, the Bhutan Scout Tshogpa was welcomed as a member of the World Organization of the Scout Movement at the 35th World Scout Conference in Durban, South Africa. The Bhutan Scouts Association has seen significant growth over the past decade. In 2011, the association had a membership of 18,170. By 2021, this number had increased to 76,876, representing a more than fourfold increase in just ten years. This growth demonstrates the increasing popularity and recognition of the scouting movement in Bhutan, and the association’s successful efforts in promoting value-based education among young people.

Since 1995, Unit Leader Training courses were organized by the World Scout Bureau-Asia-Pacific Region with the assistance of the Bharat Scouts and Guides, Bangladesh Scouts, Pakistan Boy Scouts Association, the Scout Association of Japan, and the Canadian Scout Brotherhood Fund.

In 1996, the Youth Guidance and Counseling Section was established under the Education Department, Ministry of Health and Education. The scouting program was chosen as one of the channels to promote value education among students⁴. The first Basic Scout Unit Leaders training was conducted in 1997 by a group of International Scout Leader Trainers.

Scouts from Bhutan participated in the 1998 World Jamboree in Chile, in the 20th World Scout Jamboree in Thailand and in the 21st World Scout Jamboree in the United Kingdom.

The remote kingdom hosted the Asia-Pacific Regional First South Asia Foundation-Scout Friendship Camp from February 21 to 26, 2002, in which hundreds of Scouts and Leaders in the districts of Thimphu, Punakha and Wangdue participated. "Regional Cooperation" was the theme of the camp, in which 550 girls and boys from all South Asian countries participated.

The first National Jamboree was held from January 31 to February 6, 2007.

In November 2008 the Scouts helped to prepare the Coronation Celebrations, cleaning the streets of the capital.

== Educational Program ==
The Bhutan Scouts Association offers an educational program that is based in schools and is divided into three sections: Cub (primary schools), Scout (secondary schools), and Rover (tertiary institutes). The program is designed to provide equal opportunities to all students for their all-round development, focusing on physical, intellectual, social, spiritual, and emotional potentials. The ultimate goal is character building and citizenship education.

During their training, young scouts learn about a variety of topics and skills, including pioneering, first aid, jungle survival, foot drill, rappelling, rafting, firing, mono act, hiking, and adventure. They also participate in guest lecture sessions. This training brings talented young people together to share their ideas.

In addition to school-based scouting, the association introduced Community Based Scouting in Thimphu in 2009. This program allows for continuity in the scouting program and pursues it as a lifelong education. Through Community Scouting, voluntary service to the community, institutions, and individuals are provided.

== See also ==
- World Buddhist Scout Brotherhood
