= Yongyudh Vajaradul =

Thai scientist

- Thai: ยงยุทธ วัชรดุลย์
- Born: 18 August 1940 (age 85); Chiang Mai, Thailand
- Scientific career
- Fields: Orthopedics
- Institutions: Siriraj Hospital

Professor Yongyudh Vajaradul (Thai: ยงยุทธ วัชรดุลย์, RTGS: Yongyut Wacharadun; born 18 August 1940, Chiang Mai, Thailand) is a pioneer in the field of tissue banking and the use of bone allografts in orthopedic surgery, and serves as chairman of the World Buddhist Scout Brotherhood.

== Career ==
Yongyudh established the Bangkok Biomaterial Center at Siriraj Hospital in 1984, and Thailand became the tissue banking leader of the region.

The Pan-Asiatic Tissue Banking Association was first proposed in 1985 during the Western Pacific Orthopaedic Association Congress in Bangkok, Thailand by Yongyudh, Alain Patel of France, and Norberto Agcaoili of the Philippines, with its Secretariat at Bangkok Biomaterial Center. In October 1988, during the Third International Conference on Locomotor Tissue Bank in Bangkok, the new association was born and renamed Asia-Pacific Association of Surgical Tissue Banking (APASTB). The founding members included Yongyudh, who became its first president in 1988.

Yongyudh is a member of the National Scout Executive Board and the National Scout Council of the National Scout Organization of Thailand, as well as a member of the Asia Pacific Regional Scout Committee. Yongyudh was the Charter President of the Rotary Club of Bangkok-Banglamphu District 3350, Rotary International, in 1998. Yongyudh is a chairman of Interdisciplinary network of the Royal Institute of Thailand.

== Honours ==
=== Decorations ===
- 1957 - 25th Buddhist Century Celebration Medal
- 1987 - Boy Scout Citation Medal of Vajira (First Class)
- 1992 - Member of the Order of Symbolic Propitiousness Ramkeerati
- 1993 - Chakrabarti Mala Medal
- 1995 - Freemen Safeguarding Medal (Second Class, Second Category)
- 1996 - Knight Grand Cordon (Special Class) of the Most Noble Order of the Crown of Thailand
- 1999 - Boy Scout Commendation Medal (Third Class)
- 2001 - Knight Grand Cordon (Special Class) of the Most Exalted Order of the White Elephant
- 2006 - Dushdi Mala Medal - Civilian, arts and sciences

=== Foreign Honour ===
- 1978 - Fellow of the Royal Institute of Thailand
- 1989 - Officier of the Ordre des Palmes Académiques
- 1999 - Officier of the Ordre national du Mérite
- 1999 - Silver Tiger (first Class) (Bangladesh)
- 1999 - Yongyudh was awarded an honorary membership of the European Association of Tissue Banks (EATB) at the Second World Congress and Eighth EATB Annual Meeting, October 7–10, 1999, in Warsaw, Poland.
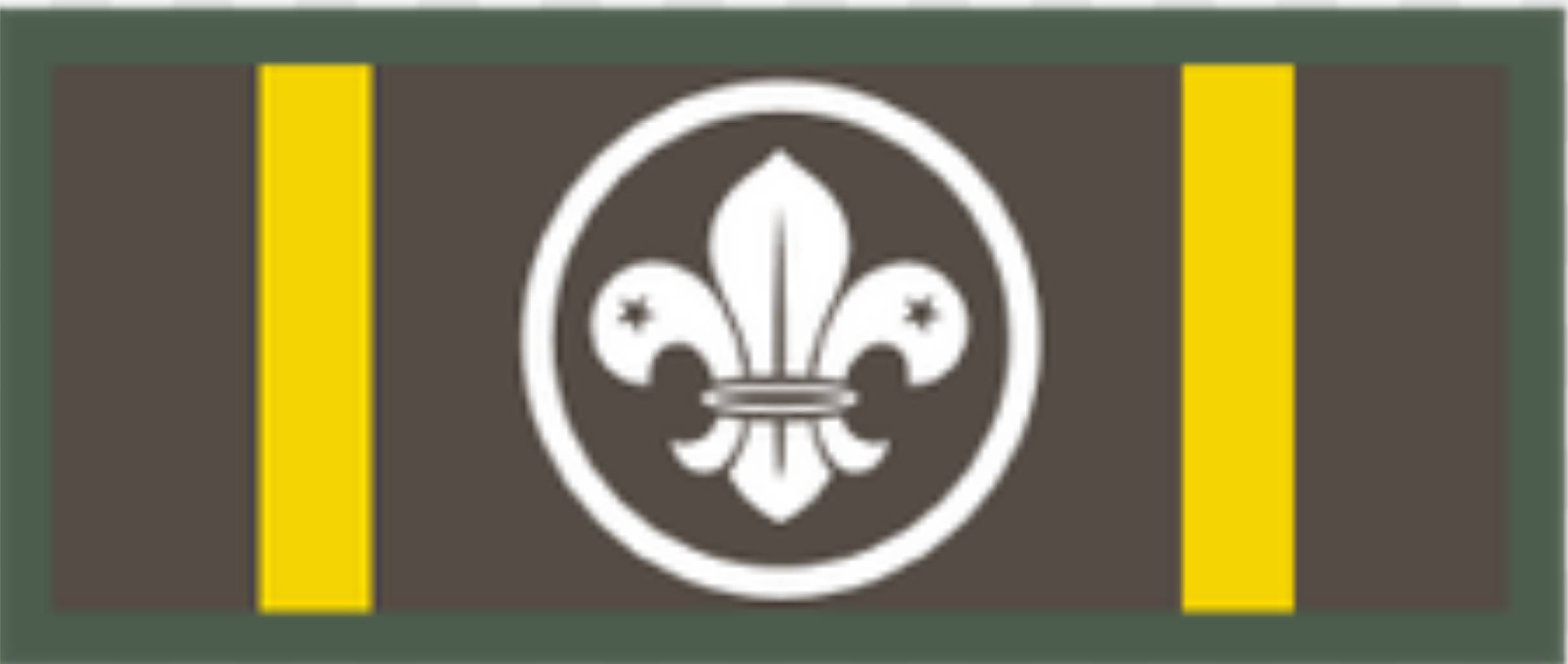
- 2008 - Bronze Wolf Award
