= Chitra Dansuputra =

Thai educator and the founder of Amnuay Silpa School

- Born: Chitra Dansuputra
- Died: 25 March 1984
- Occupation: Educator
- Known for: Founder of Amnuay Silpa School

Chitra Dansuputra (Thai: จิตร ทังสุบุตร, pronounced [tɕìt tʰāŋ.sù.bùt], died 25 March 1984) was a Thai educator and the founder of Amnuay Silpa School. He served as a member of the Asia-Pacific Scout Committee, representing the National Scout Organization of Thailand.

In 1976, Dansuputra was awarded the 107th Bronze Wolf, the only distinction of the World Organization of the Scout Movement, awarded by the World Scout Committee for exceptional services to world Scouting.
