= Kong Visudharomn =

Thai educator

- Occupation: Educator
- Known for: Contributed to the development of physical education, sport, and the Scout Movement in Thailand

Kong Visudharomn (Thai: กอง วิสุทธารมณ์, pronounced [kɔ̄ːŋ wí.sùt.tʰāː.rōm], 2 May 1907 – 1 October 1985) was a Thai educator. His work contributed to the development of physical education, sport, and the Scout Movement in Thailand. He served as Director-General of the Department of Physical Education, a member of the Olympic Committee of Thailand, and the Deputy International Commissioner of the National Scout Organization of Thailand.

In 1980, Visudharomn was awarded the 142nd Bronze Wolf, the only distinction of the World Organization of the Scout Movement, awarded by the World Scout Committee for exceptional services to world Scouting.
