= Bhethai Amatayakul =

Thai educator

- Born: 10 February 1916; Bangkok, Siam
- Died: 25 October 1991 (aged 75); Bangkok, Thailand
- Occupation: Educator
- Known for: Founder of Santirat Commercial College and Bangkok Boy Scout Club

Bhethai Amatayakul (Thai: เพทาย อมาตยกุล, pronounced [pʰēː.tʰāːj a.màːt.ta.já.kūn], 10 February 1916 – 25 October 1991) was a Thai educator who was influential in the country's Scouting movement and social welfare work. He founded the Santirat Commercial College (now the Santirat Institute of Business Administration) and the Bangkok Boy Scout Club, served as President of the National Council on Social Welfare of Thailand, and was a member of the Asia-Pacific Scout Committee, representing the National Scout Organization of Thailand.

In 1984, Bhethai was awarded the 173rd Bronze Wolf, the only distinction of the World Organization of the Scout Movement, awarded by the World Scout Committee for exceptional services to world Scouting.
