= Girl Scout Association of Mongolia =

Scout association of Mongolia

- Girl Scout Association of Mongolia
- Country: Mongolia
- Founded: 1996
- Membership: 1,050
- Affiliation: World Association of Girl Guides and Girl Scouts

The Girl Scout Association of Mongolia (Монголын Эмэгтэй Скаутын Холбоо, transliterated Mongoliyn Emegteǐ Scoutiyn Kholboo) is the national Guiding organization of Mongolia. It serves 1,050 members (as of 2008). Founded in 1996, the girls-only organization became an associate member of the World Association of Girl Guides and Girl Scouts in 2005 and a full member in 2014.

The Girl Scout Motto is Belen Bol, Be Prepared in Mongol.

== See also ==
- Mongolyn Skautyn Kholboo
