= Chulachomklao Royal Military Academy =

Military academy in Nakhon Nayok, Thailand

Coordinates: 14.298408°N 101.166400°E

- โรงเรียนนายร้อยพระจุลจอมเกล้า
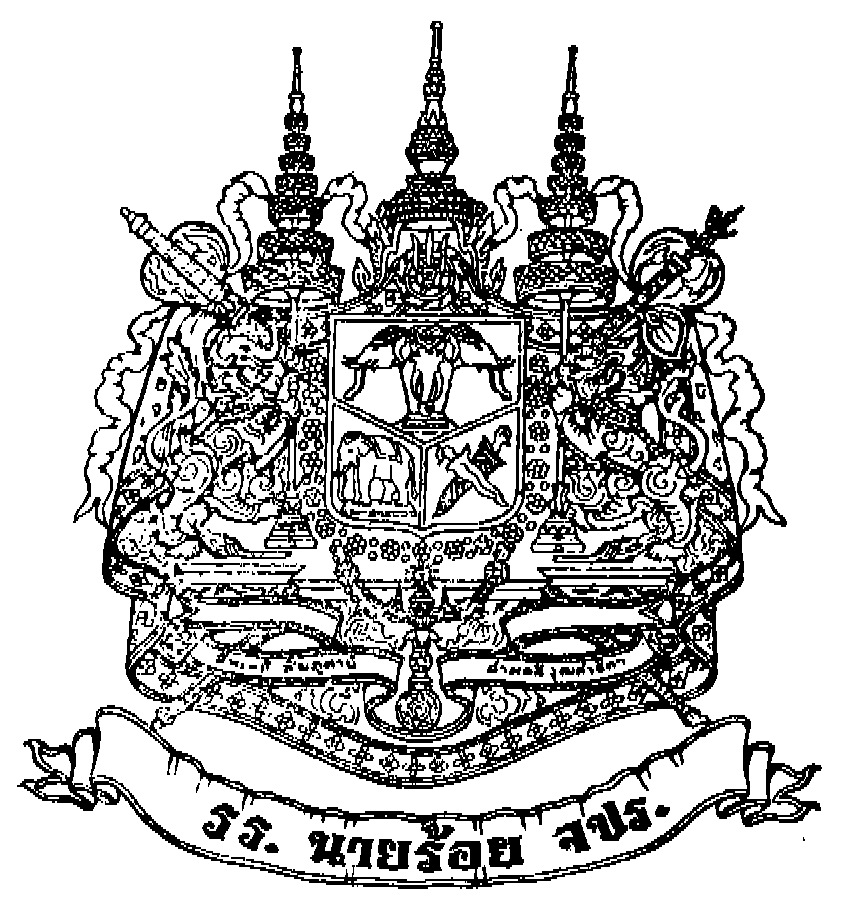
- Type: Service academy
- Established: 5 August 1887
- Founder: King Rama V
- Affiliations: Thailand
- Superintendent: Lt. Gen. Udom Kaewmaha
- Location: Suwanasorn Rd., Muang, Nakhon Nayok, Thailand
- Website: www.crma.ac.th

Chulachomklao Royal Military Academy (CRMA) (Thai: โรงเรียนนายร้อยพระจุลจอมเกล้า; RTGS: Rongrian Nairoi Phra Chunlachomklao) is the service academy of Royal Thai Army (RTA). Established in 1887, it has graduated the majority of Thailand's military leaders, many of whom have become Thai prime ministers. The academy has an intense training program. There are about 200 cadets in each class.

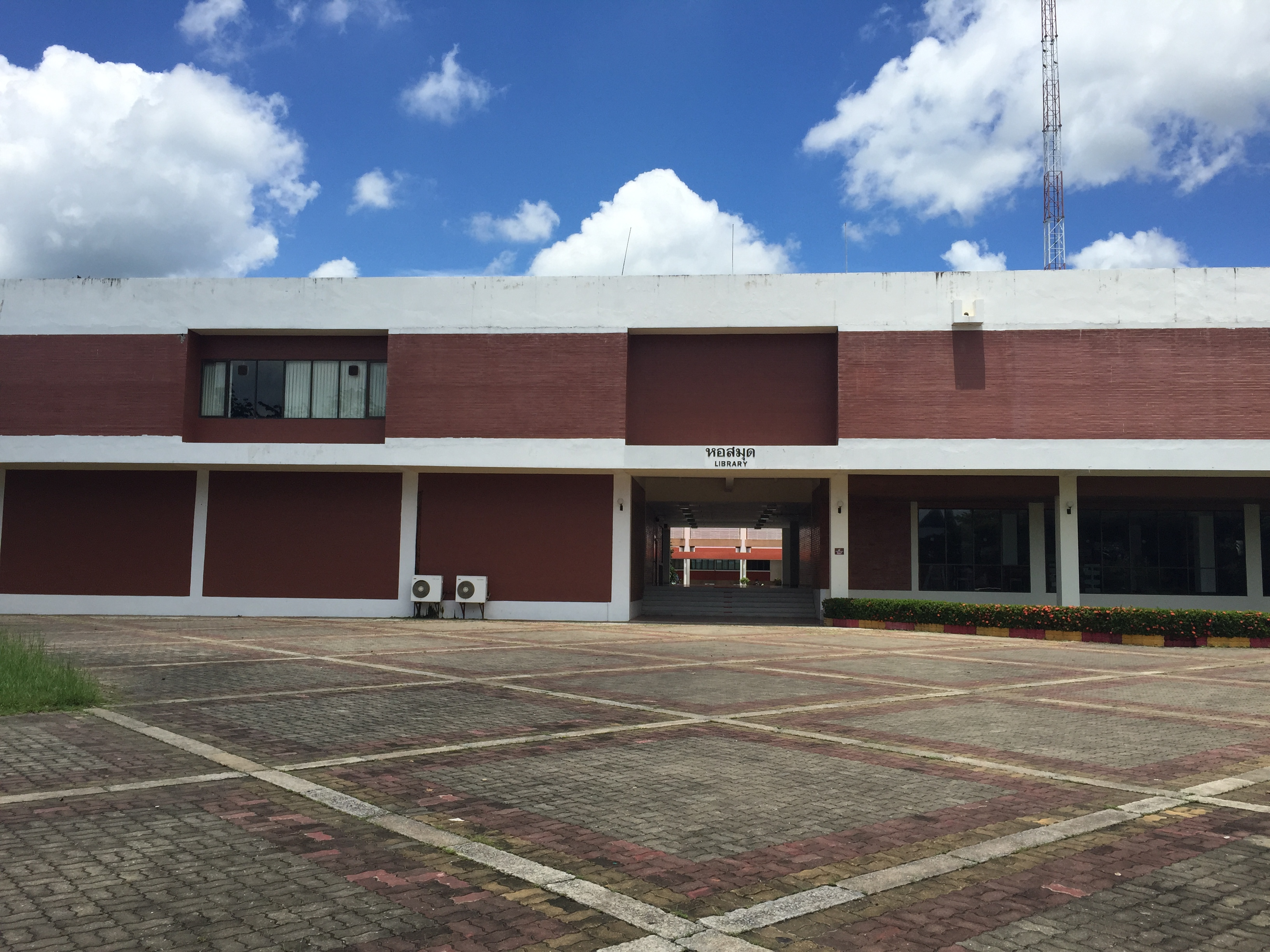
Chulachomklao Royal Military Academy's library, Nakornnayok Thailand

== History ==
CRMA was founded on 5 August 1887 by King Chulachomklao, King Rama V, also known as King Chulalongkorn. It was originally called the Royal Military Academy. On 1 January 1948, it was merged with the Royal Thai Army Polytechniques Institute, under the new name Chulachomklao Royal Military Academy in the honour of King Chulachomklao.

Chulachomklao Royal Military Academy was originally in the precinct of Saranrom Palace in Bangkok, where it remained for 77 years. In 1909 the academy was moved to Ratchadamnoen Nok Avenue in Bangkok. On 10 July 1986, it moved to its new sprawling complex at Khao Cha-ngok, Mueang District of Nakhon Nayok Province, 140 km northeast of Bangkok.

== Cadets ==
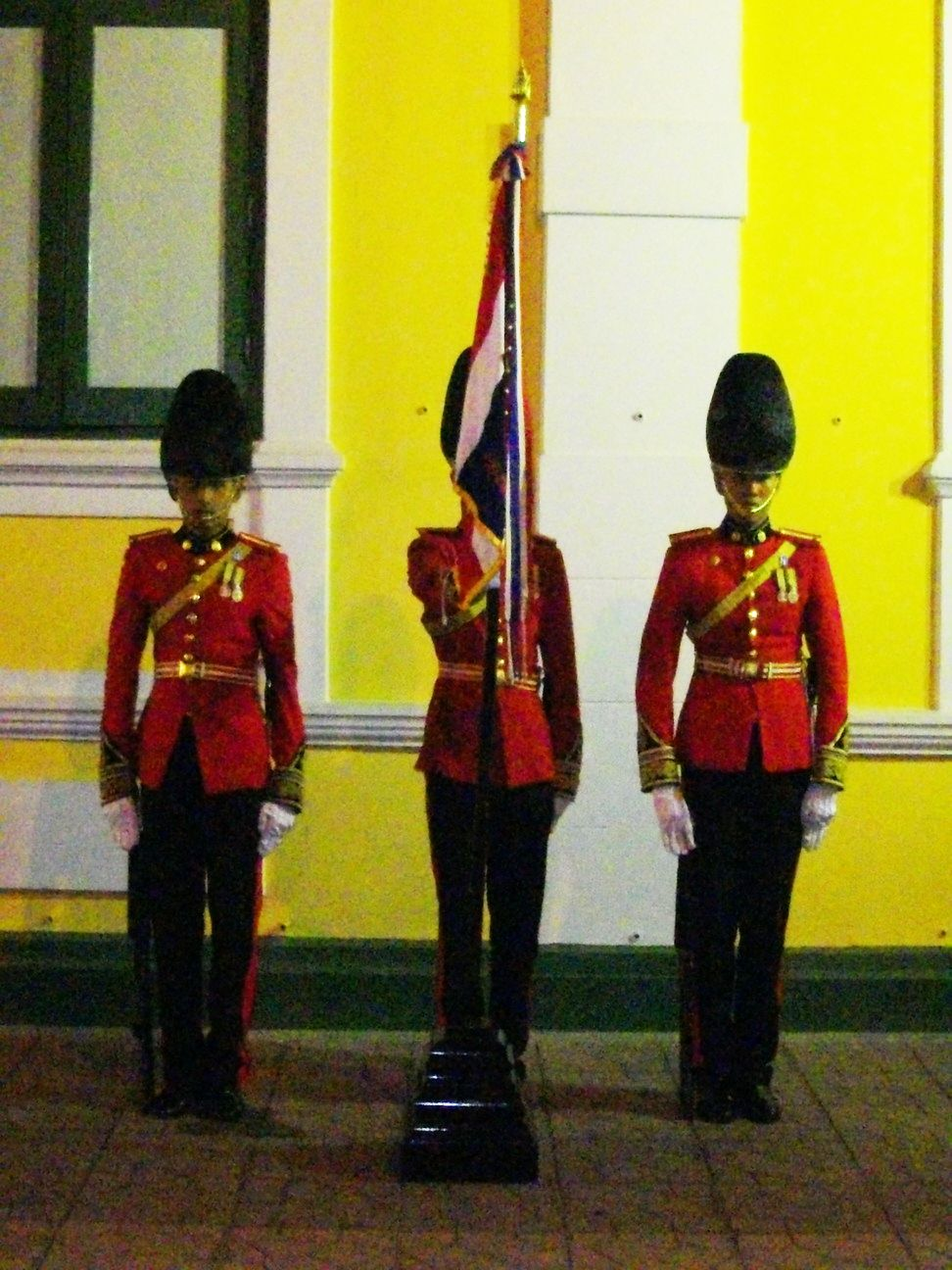
Colours and guards of the Cadet Regiment, King's Guard, CRMA, Royal Thai Army (full dress)

The academy admits only male applicants after two years attendance at the armed forces prep school (AFAPS).

In every academic year, eight to ten scholarships are offered by the Royal Thai Army to academically outstanding first-year cadets to pursue studies at foreign military institutes.

At the end of the fifth year, cadets graduate with a bachelor's degree in their chosen field of study and are commissioned as second lieutenants in the Royal Thai Army.

Major organizations within the academy are the academy headquarters, corps of cadets, the academic division, military education department, physical training section, services section, and an infantry battalion supporting the academy. Cadets have a set daily schedule. It begins at approximately 05:30. After taking care of their personal hygiene, studying for one hour, and breakfast, the academic schedule starts at 08:00 and ends at 15:00. Either military training or sports is scheduled every day from 15:30 until 17:00. Self study is scheduled again after dinner from 19:00 until 21:00.

Annual military training starts in January after the second academic semester ends. Each class is scheduled for specific training. For example, first year cadets might be trained at the infantry center. Third year cadets, who have passed the selection process, might undergo parachute training and fourth year cadets, Ranger school.

== Curriculum ==
Bachelor of Engineering

- Mechanical engineering
- Telecommunication electrical engineering
- Computer engineering
- Civil engineering
- Survey engineering
- Industrial engineering
- Ordnance industrial engineering
- Power electrical engineering
- Aeronautical engineering

Bachelor of Science

- Computer science
- General science
- Environmental science
- Information technology
- Applied chemistry

Bachelor of Arts

- Social science
- Public administration
- Management

== Alumni ==
Distinguished alumni include :

- Field Marshal Plaek Phibunsongkhram, Prime Minister from 1938 to 1944 and 1948–1957.
- Field Marshal Sarit Thanarat, Prime Minister from 1957 to 1963.
- Field Marshal Thanom Kittikachorn Prime Minister from 1 January 1958 – 20 October 1958 and 1963 – 1973.
- General Kriangsak Chomanan, Prime Minister from 1977 to 1980.
- General Prem Tinsulanonda, Prime Minister from 1980 to 1988.
- General Chatichai Choonhavan, Prime Minister from 1988 – 1991.
- General Suchinda Kraprayoon, Prime Minister from 7 April 1992 – 24 May 1992.
- General Chavalit Yongchaiyudh, Prime Minister from 1996 – 1997
- General Surayud Chulanont, Prime Minister from 2006 –January 2008.
- General Prayut Chan-o-cha, Prime Minister from 2014 – 2023
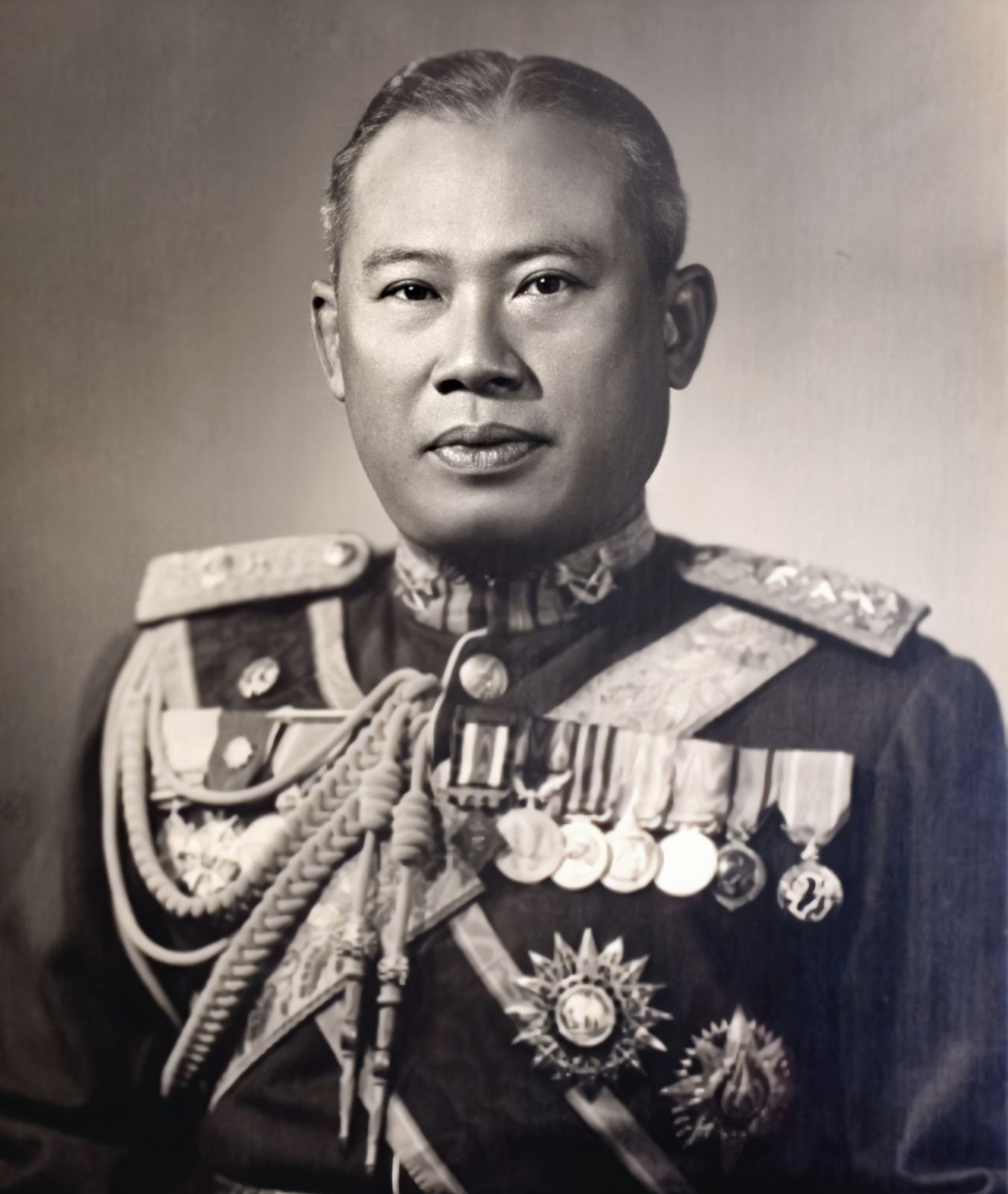
Field Marshal Thanom Kittikachorn, 10th prime minister

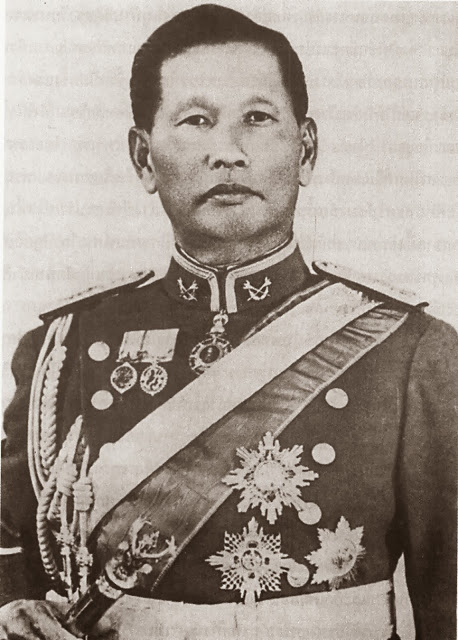
Field Marshal Sarit Thanarat, 11th prime minister

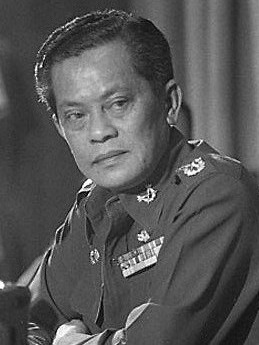
General Kriangsak Chomanan, the 15th prime minister

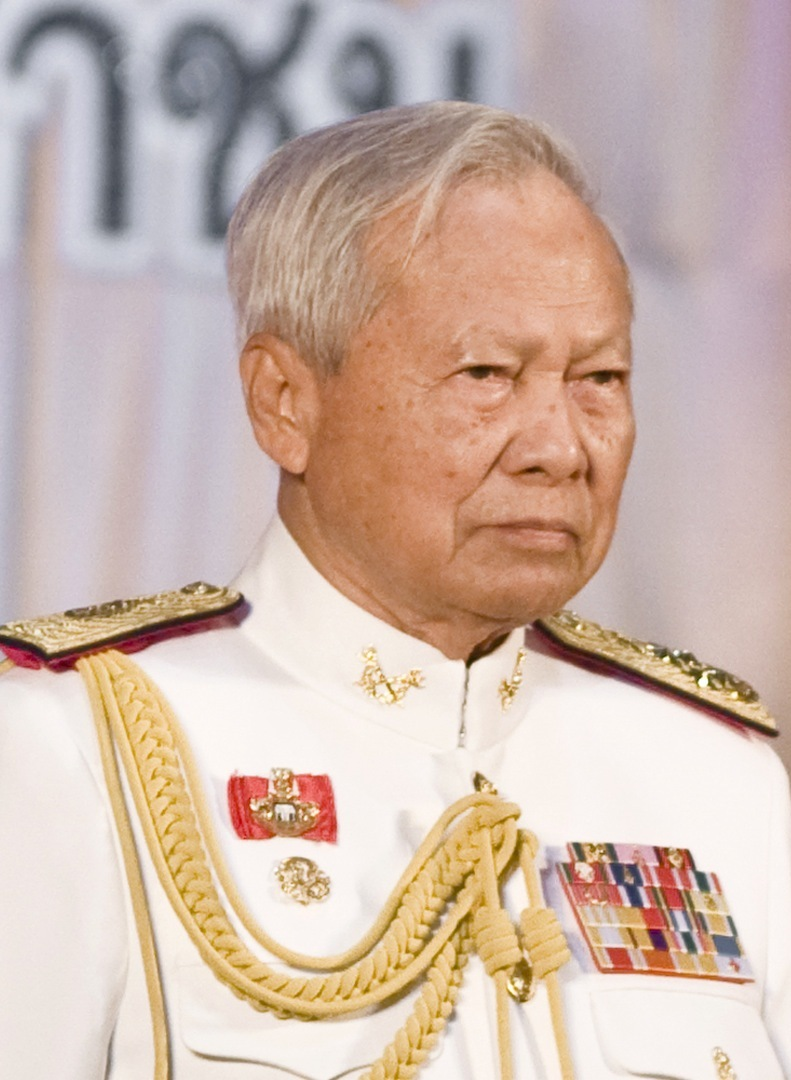
General Prem Tinsulanonda, 16th prime minister

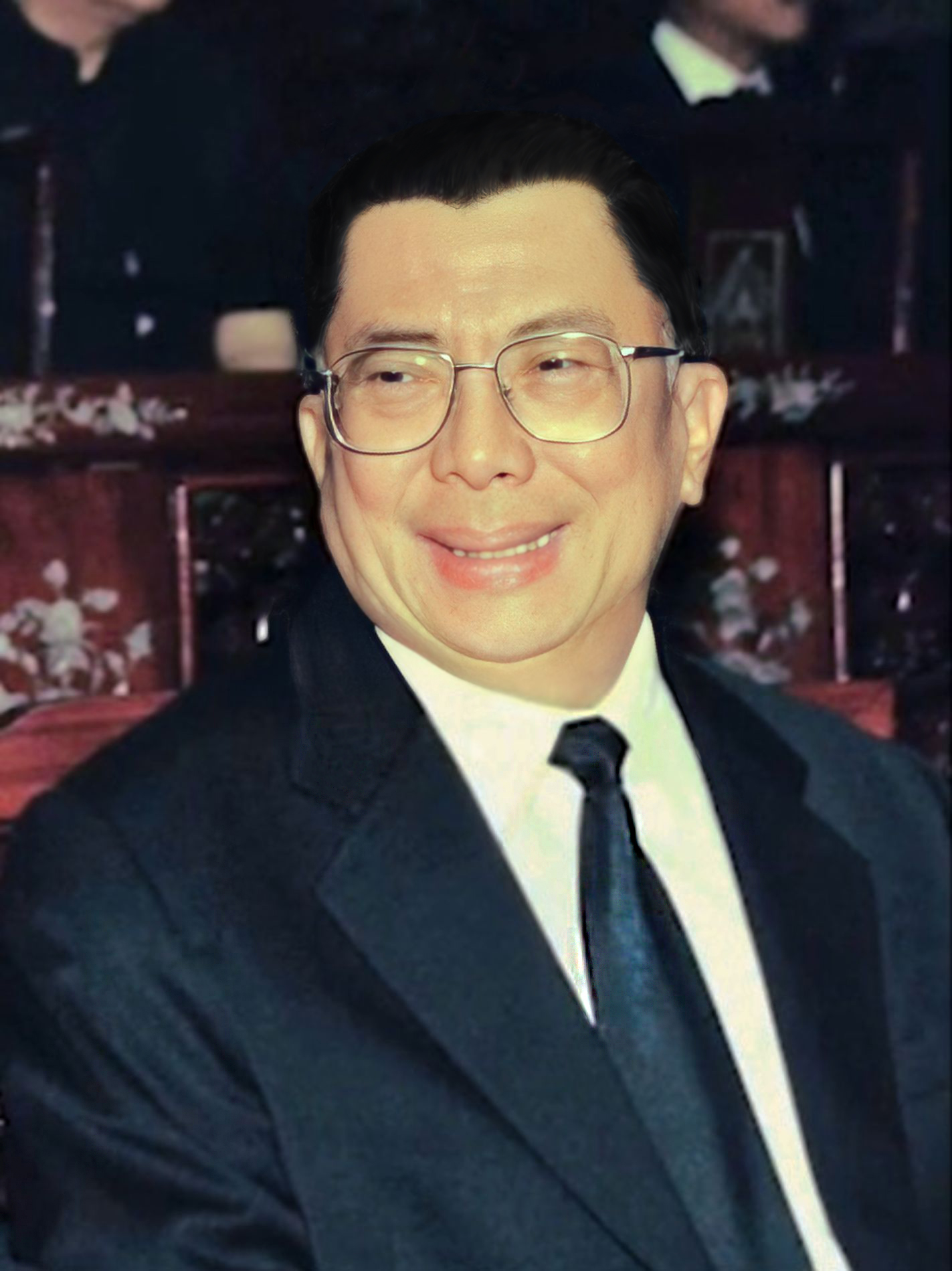
General Chavalit Yongchaiyudh, 22nd prime minister

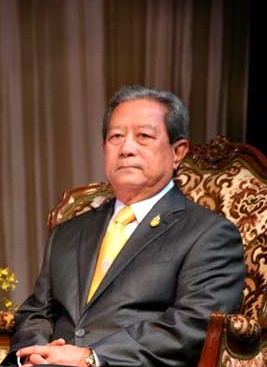
General Surayud Chulanont, 24th prime minister

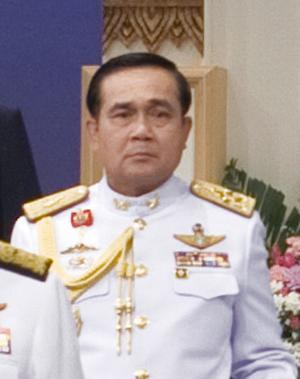
General Prayut Chan-o-cha, 29th prime minister

== See also ==
- Royal Thai Air Force Academy
- Royal Thai Naval Academy
- Armed Forces Academies Preparatory School
- National Defence College of Thailand
