= Ayutthaya Wittayalai School =

School in Phra Nakhon Si Ayutthaya, Thailand

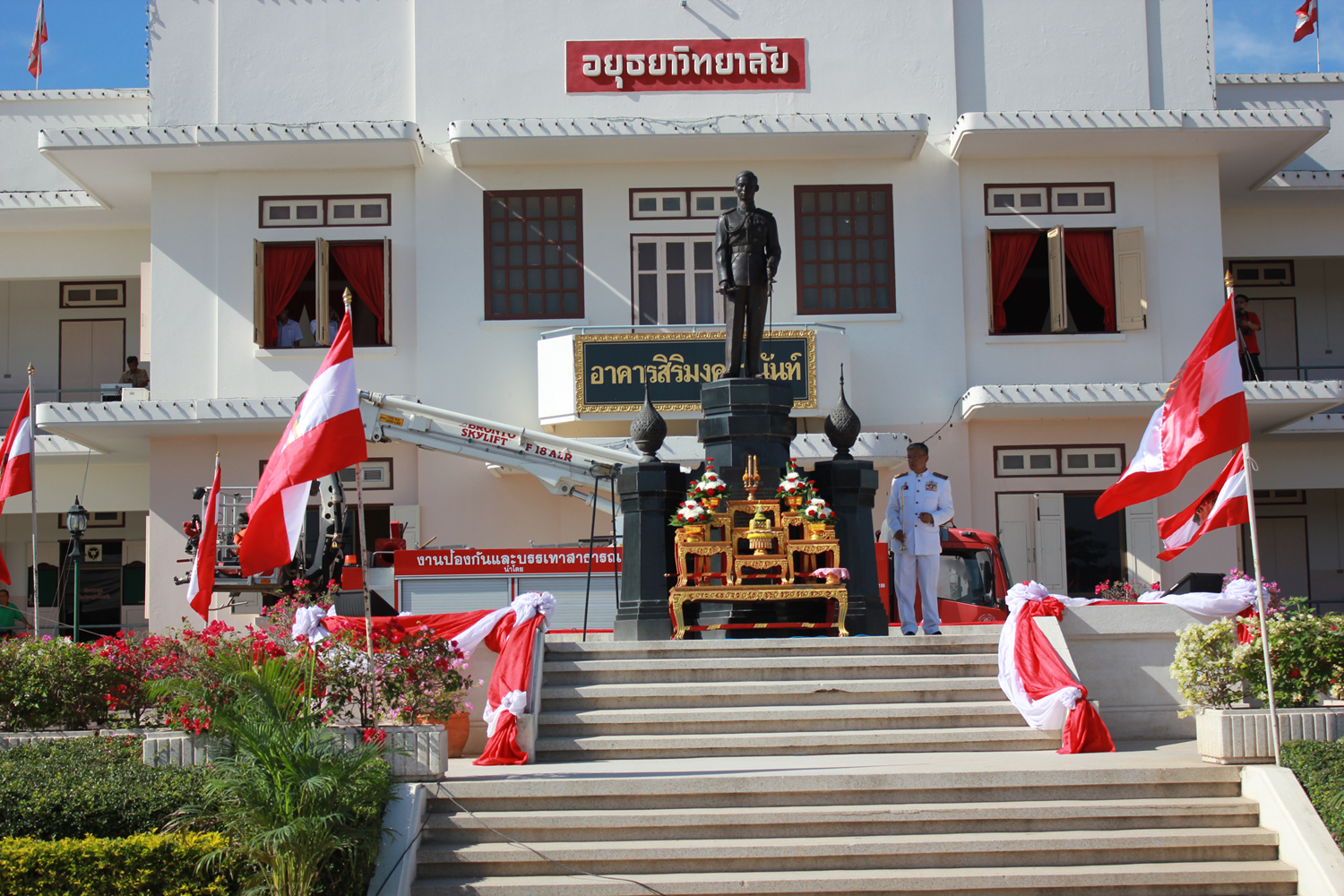

Location
- Pratoo Chai, Phra Nakhon Si Ayutthaya. Ayutthaya, Ayutthaya, 13000; Thailand
- 14.351982°N 100.566976°E

Information
- Former name: Krung Kao Model School
- Motto: Attentive Learning, Always Doing Good, Being Disciplined, and Working for Society.
- Established: March 1905
- Founders: Chulalongkorn (Original location), Pridi Banomyong (Current location)
- School board: The Secondary Educational Service Area Office Phra Nakhon Si Ayutthaya
- School district: Pratoo Chai
- Authority: Office of the Basic Education Commission of Thailand
- School number: 1014101001
- Director: Kritsub Chuaphan
- Teaching staff: 206
- Grades: 7–12 (Mathayom 1–6)
- Enrollment: 4,240
- Classes: 105
- Average class size: 55
- Student to teacher ratio: 22.195
- Language: (Thailand) Thai (United Kingdom) English (China) Chinese (Japan) Japanese (South Korea) Korean (France) French
- Classrooms: 96
- Colour: White - Red
- Song: Ayutthaya Wittayalai's Flag Song
- Website: www.ayw.ac.th

Ayutthaya Wittayalai School (A.Y.W., Thai: โรงเรียนอยุธยาวิทยาลัย) is a public high school in Phra Nakhon Si Ayutthaya, Thailand, established in March 1905 during King Chulalongkorn's reign.

== History ==
The school was first founded as Krung Kao Model School, a regional school of Monthon Krung Kao by order of Rama V, who intended to create schools across the country based on Suankularb Wittayalai School, the first royal school in Thailand, to provide education to people across regions in the newly founded nation-state.

In the early years of the school, the school had to use temple facilities behind the Chankasem Palace as learning facilities. Then later the school became more popular and proper buildings were built.

After the Siamese Revolution of 1932, Monthon Krung Kao was reorganized as Phra Nakhon Si Ayutthaya province, and the school was renamed as Ayutthaya Wittayalai School.

Pridi Banomyong, an alumni who was one of the leaders of the revolution, and later held important government positions, deemed the venue of the school too small and unfit, and decided moved the school from behind Chankasem Palace to the current location. Pridi Banomyong then submitted to royal petition to King Rama VIII for funding to build the new campus at the current location.

== Facilities ==
- Statue of King Ananda Mahidol (King Rama VIII)
- Building 1 (Sirimongkalananda Building)
- Building 2
- Building 3
- Building 4
- Building 5 (Queen Sirikit 60th Anniversary Building)
- Building 6
- Building 7 (Boonprasert Building)
- Building 8 (Anandasilpa Building)
- Building 9 (Ayutthaya Wittayalai's 100th Anniversary Building)
- Building 10
- Building 11 (Hana Building)
- Building 12 (Aksarananda Building)
- Subabhibhat Building
- Tishyaraksha Building
- Information Building
- Industrial and Home Economics Center
- Agricultural Center
- King Rama VIII Hall
- Hall 2
- Dome 1
- Dome 2 (Indoor Stadium)
- Dome 3 (Indoor Stadium)
- Dome 4
- Takraw Gym
- Football Field
- Ayutthaya Wittayalai's Sport Center
- Ayutthaya Wittayalai's Swimming Pool
- Ayutthaya Wittayalai's 100th Anniversary Wall

== List of directors ==
| No. | Name | Years in office |
|---|---|---|
| 1 | Khun Prakobwutthisart (Phraya Ratchayotha) | 1905 - 1906 |
| 2 | Phra Anusitviboon (Mr. Piam) | 1906 - 1907 |
| 3 | Phra Visedkalapakit (Mr. Rat) | 1907 |
| 4 | Khun Bumnetworasarn (Mr. Chid) | 1908 |
| 5 | Phra Chamnankabuansorn (Mr. Choei) | 1909 |
| 6 | Mr. Rat | 1909 - 1910 |
| 7 | Mr. Pun | 1910 |
| 8 | Mr. Lek | 1911 |
| 9 | Mr. Phan | 1912 |
| 10 | Khun Kranvichasorn (Mr. Vicha) | 1913 - 1921 |
| 11 | Khun Songworawit (Mr. Man) | 1921 - 1923 |
| 12 | Luang Parasarn (Khun Parasarn) | 1923 - 1934 |
| 13 | Mr. Fung Srivijarn | 1935 - 1936 |
| 14 | Mr. Chaluay Sataporn | 1936 - 1938 |
| 15 | Mr. Surin Sornsiri | 1938 - 1939 |
| 16 | Mr. Sang Isarangkun na Ayuthaya | 1939 - 1941 |
| 17 | Mr. Chuea Sariman | 1941 - 1943 |
| 18 | Mr. Chuea Somboonwong | 1943 - 1945 |
| 15 (2) | Mr. Surin Sornsiri | 1946 - 1948 |
| 19 | Mr. Weaw Nilphayak | 1948 - 1955 |
| 20 | Mr. Jaroon Songsiri | 1955 - 1962 |
| 21 | Mr. Phitthaya Watthananusan | 1962 - 1973 |
| 22 | Mr. Jaroen Laddapong | 1974 - 1983 |
| 23 | Mr. Luecha Sroypan | 1983 - 1985 |
| 24 | Mr. Manoch Panto | 1985 - 1987 |
| 25 | Mr. Chalit Jaroensri | 1987 - 1989 |
| 26 | Mr. Uthen Jaroenkul | 1989 - 1992 |
| 27 | Mr. Jakkrit Theera-at | 1992 - 1999 |
| 28 | Mr. Wiroj Phuksuwan | 1999 - 2000 |
| 29 | Ms. Ratchanee Suppapong | 2000 - 2003 |
| 30 | Mr. Amnat Srichai | 2003 - 2004 |
| 31 | Mr. Manoch Chanthep | 2004 - 2011 |
| 32 | Mr. Chalermsak Parathunya | 2011 - 2016 |
| 33 | Mr. Warakorn Ruenkamol | 2016 - 2019 |
| 34 | Mr. Sucheep Boonwong | 2019 - 2021 |
| 35 | Mr. Kritsub Chuaphan | 2021 - Incumbent |

== Curriculum ==
Programs

- Junior High School (Mathayom 1-3)
1. Enrichment Program of Science, Mathematics, Technology, and Environment (SMTE)
2. English Program
  - Science-Mathematics Program
  - Mathematics-English Program
3. Science-Mathematics Program
4. Mathematics-Languages Program
5. Basic Education Program
- Senior High School (Mathayom 4-6)
1. Enrichment Program of Science, Mathematics, Technology, and Environment (SMTE)
2. Science-Mathematics Program
3. English-Mathematics Program
4. English-Japanese Program
5. English-Chinese Program
6. English-French Program
7. English-Korean Program
8. Thai-Social Studies Program
9. Computer Graphics Program
10. Physical Education Program

== Notable alumni ==
- Pridi Banomyong – 7th prime minister of Thailand and founder of Thammasat University
- Thawan Thamrongnawasawat – 8th prime minister of Thailand
- Jinavajiralongkorn or Ariyavangsagatayana VIII (Vasana Vāsano) – 18th Supreme Patriarch of Thailand
