= Amnuay Silpa School =

Coordinates: 13.760207°N 100.527787°E

- โรงเรียนอำนวยศิลป์

Location
- 304/1 Sri Ayutthaya Road; Ratchathewi; Bangkok 10400; Thailand

Information
- Type: Private
- Established: 24 May 1926
- Founder: Chitra Dansuputra
- Principal: Andrew Parry
- Gender: Coeducational
- Language: Thai, English
- Website: www.amnuaysilpa.ac.th

Amnuay Silpa School (Thai: โรงเรียนอำนวยศิลป์; RTGS: Rong Rian Amnuai Sin) is a coeducational private school in Bangkok, Thailand. It teaches kindergarten, primary and secondary levels. The school was founded in 1926, formerly as an all-boy school in the early years. Chitra Dansuputra was the co-founder and the owner of the school. He later set up a non-profit educational trust Amnuay Silpa Foundation and donated the school to the foundation in 1960.

At its peak, the school had a student body of 7,000, but has since scaled down to about 1,500. Its alumni include six prime ministers of Thailand: Kriangsak Chamanan, Chatichai Choonhavan, Anand Panyarachun, Suchinda Kraprayoon, Chavalit Yongchaiyudh and Somchai Wongsawat.

The school has achieved the status as the first thinking school in Asia and has since adopted a combined Thai-UK curriculum. It is the only Thai/English bilingual school in Thailand to receive the CIS (Council of International Schools) accreditation.

== History ==
Established on May 24, 1926, Amnuay Silpa School started as a tutorial school founded by teachers from Suan Kularb School. The school was later re-established as an all-boy school 3 years later by Mr. Chitra Dansuputra who stepped in after Mr. Sanit Sumawong, the previous school principal, left the teaching profession.

In 1948, the Amnuay Silpa Alumni Association was formed with the aim to create unity amongst alumni to partake in charity and social events.

Since 1996, the school has implemented staff development programmes to revise its educational approach, introducing child-centred learning and incorporating elements of the Montessori and project-based learning methods.

The school later adopted a combined Thai-UK curriculum. Since 2009, the school has been approved by Cambridge International Examination Centre to conduct IGCSEs and A levels examination and is the first bilingual school under the department of education to be authorised by the University of Cambridge.

The school was named a finalist for the 2025 World’s Best School Prize, organised by T4 Education.

== Academics and curriculum ==
Amnuay Silpa School follows a combined Thai-UK curriculum which consists of National curriculum of Thailand and the National Curriculum for England and Wales.

There are 3 sections: Foundation, Primary and Secondary

- Foundation – Pre-nursery up to Year 2 or pre-kindergarten to Prathom 1
- Primary – Year 3 to Year 6 or Prathom 2 to Prathom 5
- Secondary – Year 7 to Year 13 or Prathom 6 to Mathayom 6

The school is also an official examination centre for its external assessments including ONET, IGCSEs, A Levels, IELTS, SATs and others.

Both IGCSEs and A Levels are administered by Cambridge International Education (CIE).

== Accreditation ==
Amnuay Silpa School has been accredited by Exeter University for its Thinking Programme implementation in 2009 for achieving the status as the first thinking school in Asia. The school also received accreditation from the Council of International School (CIS) in January 2022 and joined the Federation of British International Schools in Asia (FOBISIA) later that same year, being the second oldest school in the federation. The school is also accredited by the Office for National Education Standards and Quality Assessment (ONESQA) of Thailand. The school is an approved examination centre for IGCSEs, AS and A Levels by the University of Cambridge, as well as IELTS by the British Council.

== Notable alumni ==
6 Prime Ministers of Thailand were Amnuay Silpa School alumni:

- General Kriangsak Chamanan the 15th Prime Minister
- General Chatchai Choonhavan the 17th Prime Minister
- Mr. Anand Panyarachun the 18th Prime Minister
- General Suchinda Kraprayoon the 19th Prime Minister
- General Chavalit Yongchaiyudh the 22nd Prime Minister
- Mr. Somchai Wongsawat the 26th Prime Minister
