= Armed Forces Academies Preparatory School =

Senior high school in Nakhon Nayok Province, Thailand

- โรงเรียนเตรียมทหาร

Location
- Nakhon Nayok; Thailand
- Coordinates: 14°18′13″N 101°07′48″E

Information
- Type: Cadet-preparatory school
- Motto: สามัคคี มีความรู้ คู่คุณธรรม (Unity Wisdom Virtue)
- Established: 27 January 1958; 68 years ago
- Founder: Thanom Kittikachorn
- Authority: National Defense Studies Institute Royal Thai Armed Forces Headquarters
- Gender: Boys (15–17)
- Enrolment: ~500
- Colour
- Feeder to: Chulachomklao Royal Military Academy; Royal Thai Naval Academy; Royal Thai Air Force Academy; Royal Thai Police Cadet
- Alumni: Thaksin Shinawatra; Surayud Chulanont; Prayut Chan-o-cha
- Website: www.afaps.ac.th

The Armed Forces Academies Preparatory School or AFAPS (Thai: โรงเรียนเตรียมทหาร) is a senior high school in Nakhon Nayok Province. It is a flagship institution of the National Defence Studies Institute Royal Thai Armed Forces Headquarters. The curriculum consists of academic and physical training as well as other activities. Cadets who manage to graduate automatically gain entrance to the Chulachomklao Royal Military Academy, the Royal Thai Naval Academy, the Royal Thai Air Force Academy, or the Royal Thai Police Academy.

The school accepts only male applicants. Admission to AFAPS is selective. The number of applicants per year exceeds 70,000 and over 600 are accepted, making overall acceptance rate less than 1%. With more than 600 cadets per class year, the academy's enrollment is around 2,000. The cadet regiment represents all provinces of Thailand. The academy supports the traditions and ceremonies of Buddhist, Muslim, and Christian students.

The school has a reputation for producing close lifelong bonds between the pre-cadets of each class. Rivalries between classes are common, especially in the promotion process.

== History ==
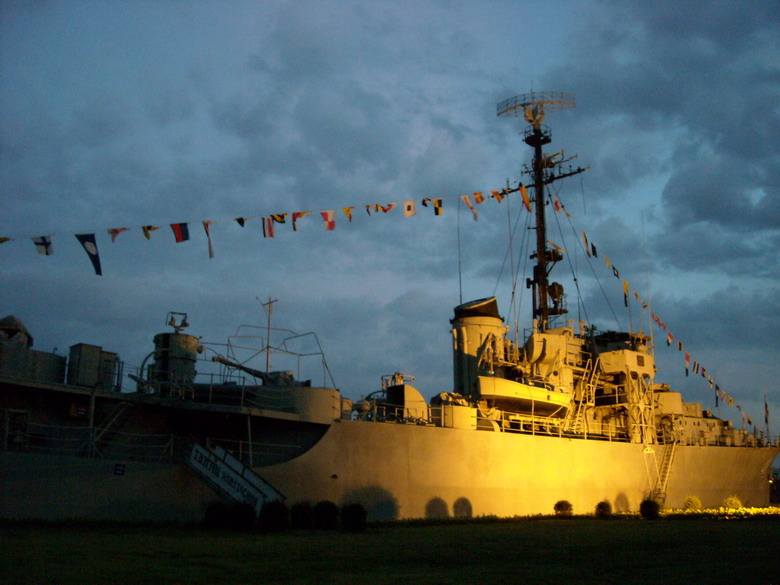
Warship museum at Armed Forces Academies Preparatory School, Thailand

The Thai Ministry of Defence established the Armed Forces Academies Preparatory School, literally in Thai language 'Prepare for Military', on 27 January 1958 by consolidating the preparatory schools of the Royal Thai Army, Navy, and Air Force, also, the Ministry of Interior sent 40 men of the Royal Thai Police to study in the new Armed forces Academies Preparatory school, according to the agreement in 1951, forming the first and second generation.

They used the building of the Chulachomklao Royal Military Academy in Ratchadamnoen Avenue in the first five years. Then they moved into their new place in Rama IV road, next to Lumphini Park in Bangkok, (the current site of One Bangkok).

In 2000, the academy moved to a new 4 km^{2} site in Nakhon Nayok Province.

== Command Structure ==
As an institution involving the four service branches of the Armed Forces of Thailand, the commanding officers consist of officers from each branch. The Academy Commander is an Army Major General, and accompanied by four Executive Officers, one from each of the service branches.

The Royal Thai Police, while structured similarly to the armed force, follows a different notion for its officer positions. Its officers, whom are relegates from the Royal Thai Police Academy's Cadet Command Division, are of the rank equivalent to the armed force counterpart, for their respective positions.

=== Pre-Cadet Regiment ===
The Pre-Cadet Regiment is divided into four Pre-Cadet Battalions, 1 to 4. As with the school's command structure, the Regiment's command structure also consist of officers from all service branches.

Each of the four battalions is themed after the four service branches, namely in the battalion's color and its commanding officer. In order, the 1st Battalion after the Army, the 2nd Battalion after the Navy, the 3rd Battalion after the Air Force, and the 4th Battalion after the Police Force.

The Pre-Cadets themselves, however, do not necessarily get assigned to the service branch in which they received acceptance into (e.g. a Pre-Cadet to graduate and enroll into the Naval Academy may not be assigned to the 2nd Battalion, which is themed after the Navy).

== Academics ==
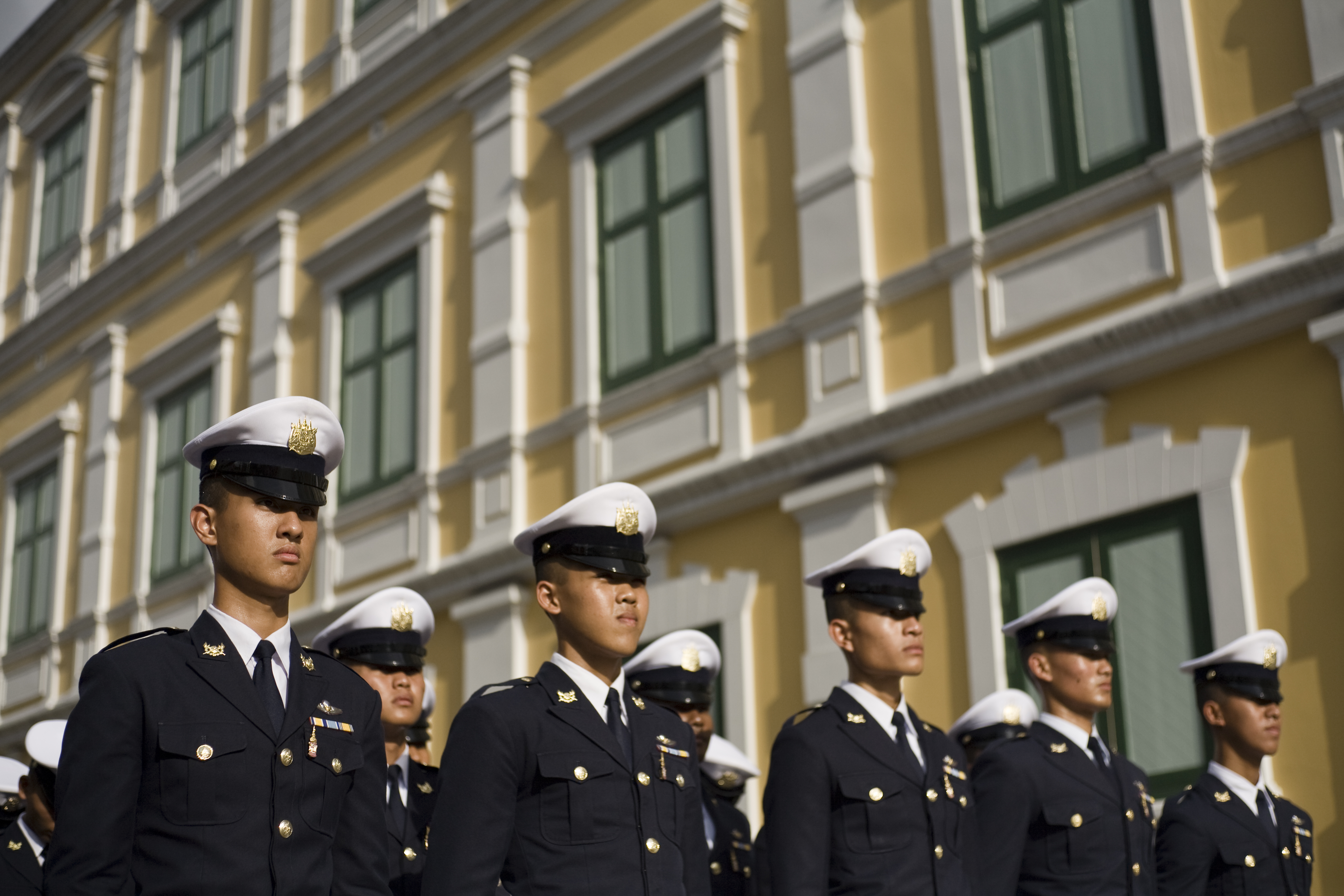
Pre-cadet uniform

In last two years program for a senior high school level, AFAPS provides a rigorous academic program, with a focus on science, mathematics, and pre-engineering courses. Cadets study academics for four days a week in academic buildings from 08:00 to 16:00. On designated training days, study time is divided in half. In the morning, a wide range of sport and health education classes (i.e., rugby, track and field, fencing, paramedic swimming, etc.) are offered. In the afternoon, cadets study military science and strategies, including military structure, field survival, and weapon training.

AFAPS provides courses in English, Chinese, mathematics (through algebra and calculus), history and social science, laboratory science, art, music, and religious studies. Cadets may also choose to join club programs such as marching band, exhibition drill, poetry, and sports.

Evening classes are offered to students in Olympiad programs and as optional learning opportunities.

Grade point average (GPA) is measured on a 4.0 scale. Cadets are ranked academically.

== Sports ==
=== Long distance running ===
Cadets run about five kilometres each morning and more than 10 kilometres each afternoon. AFAPS encourages cadets to compete in marathons, and many win awards each year. In-school 10 kilometre mini-marathons are hosted every month.

=== Swimming ===
AFAPS has two indoor swimming pools, one 50 meter pool and one 25 meter pool. Cadets are trained to swim long distances and in paramedic swimming. One of the tests is a four kilometre swim which every cadet must pass to graduate. AFAPS hosts one of the biggest annual swimming competitions in Thailand.

== Research ==
AFAPS is the only secondary school in Thailand to support military research. The policy allows personnel and cadets to study a wide range of military subjects, such as military technology, physical training, and military psychology. The most famous and considered the main research program is military technology. The Mechatronic Club is largely responsible for this area of research. AFAPS works with both other military departments and private agencies on various local and national research projects to forge innovations in science and technology that can benefit the Thai military.

The Mechatronic club has a reputation of developing award-winning military robots that serve different purposes. In 2013, one cadet project was research on the effectiveness of camouflage. This project is now being studied by the armed forces. In 2014, an AFAPS research team created a laser-guided shooting practice system and an automatic food crops system.
