= Royal Thai Naval Academy =

Naval academy of Thailand

- โรงเรียนนายเรือ
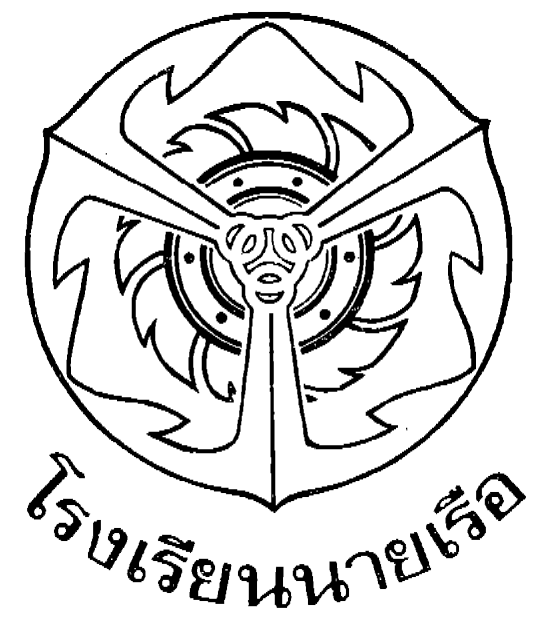
- Type: Naval Academy
- Established: 1898; 128 years ago
- Founders: King Rama V
- Parent institution: The Royal Thai Navy
- Affiliations: Thailand
- Location: Samut Prakan, Thailand; 13.611°N 100.592°E
- Website: Official website

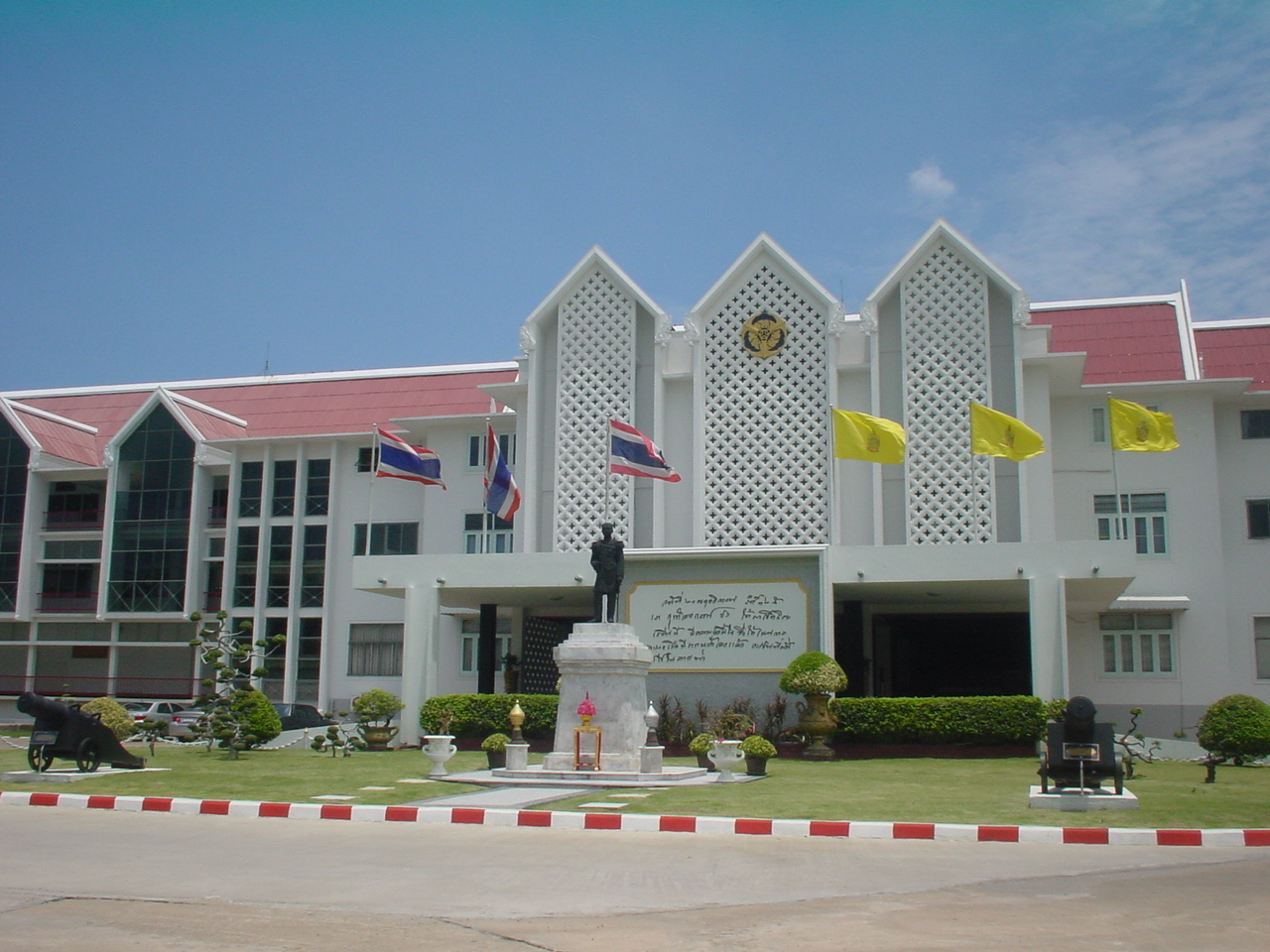
Royal Thai Naval Academy Headquarters

The Royal Thai Naval Academy (Thai: โรงเรียนนายเรือ) (RTNA) was established by King Chulalongkorn (Rama V) in 1898. He officially opened the academy on 20 November 1906. Originally located on the royal yacht Maha Chakri and some other boats donated by the king, the academy later moved to Wang Derm Palace in Thonburi (in the compound of the present headquarters of the Royal Thai Navy), then to Sattahip, and finally to its current location in Samut Prakan in 1952. The academy is served by Royal Thai Naval Academy BTS station.

== Mission ==
The mission of the RTNA is to train officers for the Royal Thai Navy and Royal Thai Marine Corps.

== Curriculum ==
The RTNA provides undergraduate programs in engineering and science, combined with naval professional training. Cadets can major in electrical engineering, marine engineering, hydraulic engineering, and management science and are trained as engineers, navigators, and marines.

== Graduation ==
Cadets graduate with a bachelor's degree in engineering or science and are commissioned in the Royal Thai Navy with the rank of ensign (sub-lieutenant). Together with graduates of the other armed forces and police academies they receive their swords from the king personally or the king's representative.

== Education of Thai naval officers ==
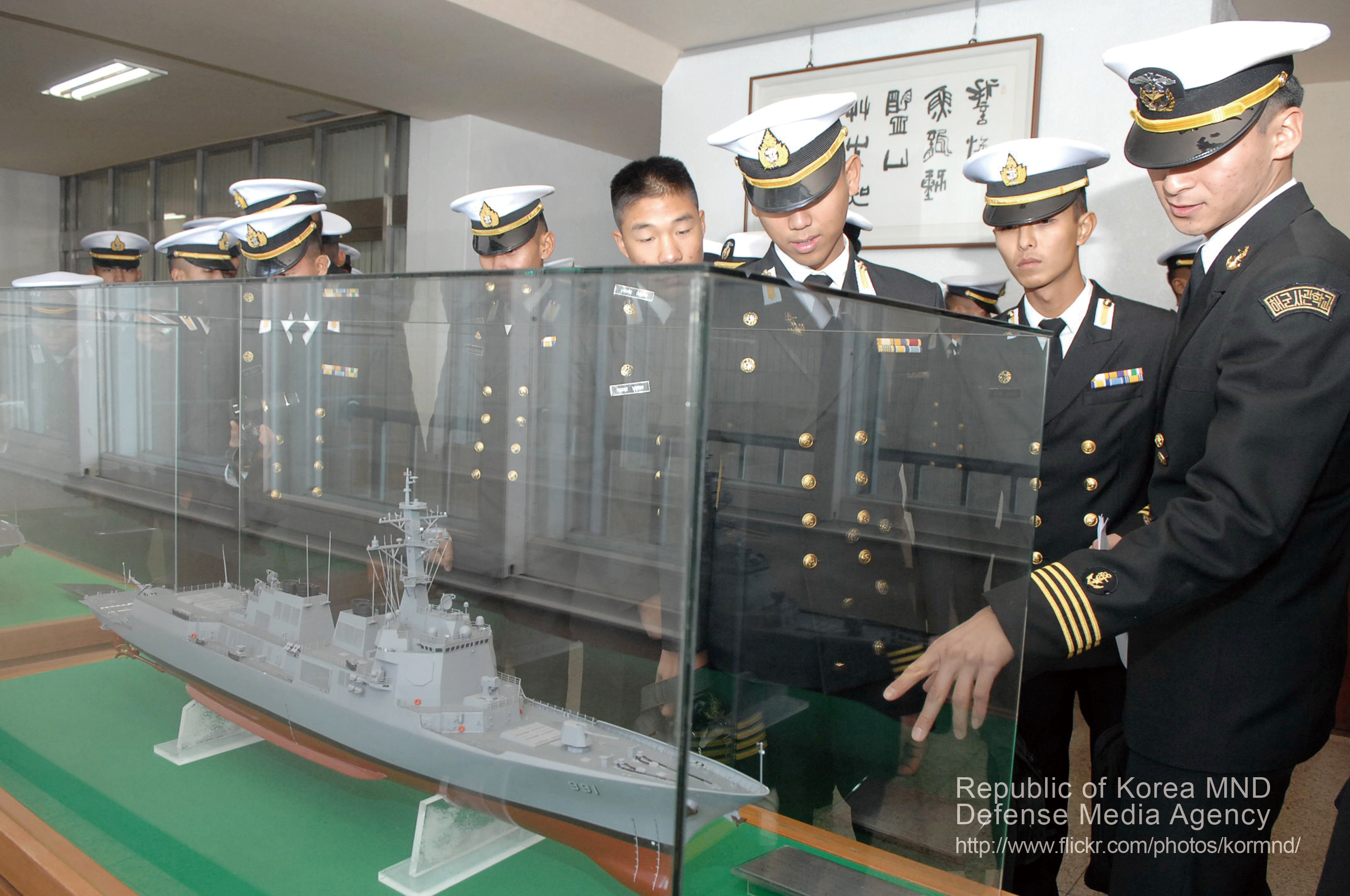
Thai cadets, during a friendly exchange program, look around the museum in Naval Academy in Jin-hae, Republic of Korea

Those who want to enter the academy first have to pass the entrance exam, after which they join a two-year preparatory program at the Armed Forces Academies Preparatory School where they study together with army, air force, and police cadets.

On successful completion, they enter the Royal Thai Naval Academy. After graduation, they attend a further one-year advanced course at Sattahip that leads to a graduate diploma in naval science. On completion of this course, they are ready to work as officers in the Royal Thai Navy and Royal Thai Marine Corps.

The academy also trains police cadets destined to work at the marine police, while every year a few top graduates of the Naval Rating School for non-commissioned officers enter the academy directly after a separate entrance exam.

Selected first-year cadets of the RTNA are awarded scholarships to study at naval academies abroad. On their return to Thailand they start working as officers in the Royal Thai Navy straightaway.

== Curriculum ==
The RTNA provides undergraduate programs in engineering and computer and materials science.

- Bachelor of Engineering
  - Electrical engineering
  - Marine engineering
  - Hydraulic engineering
- Bachelor of Science
  - Management science
  - Naval Science

== Naval Cadet Regiment, King's Guard ==
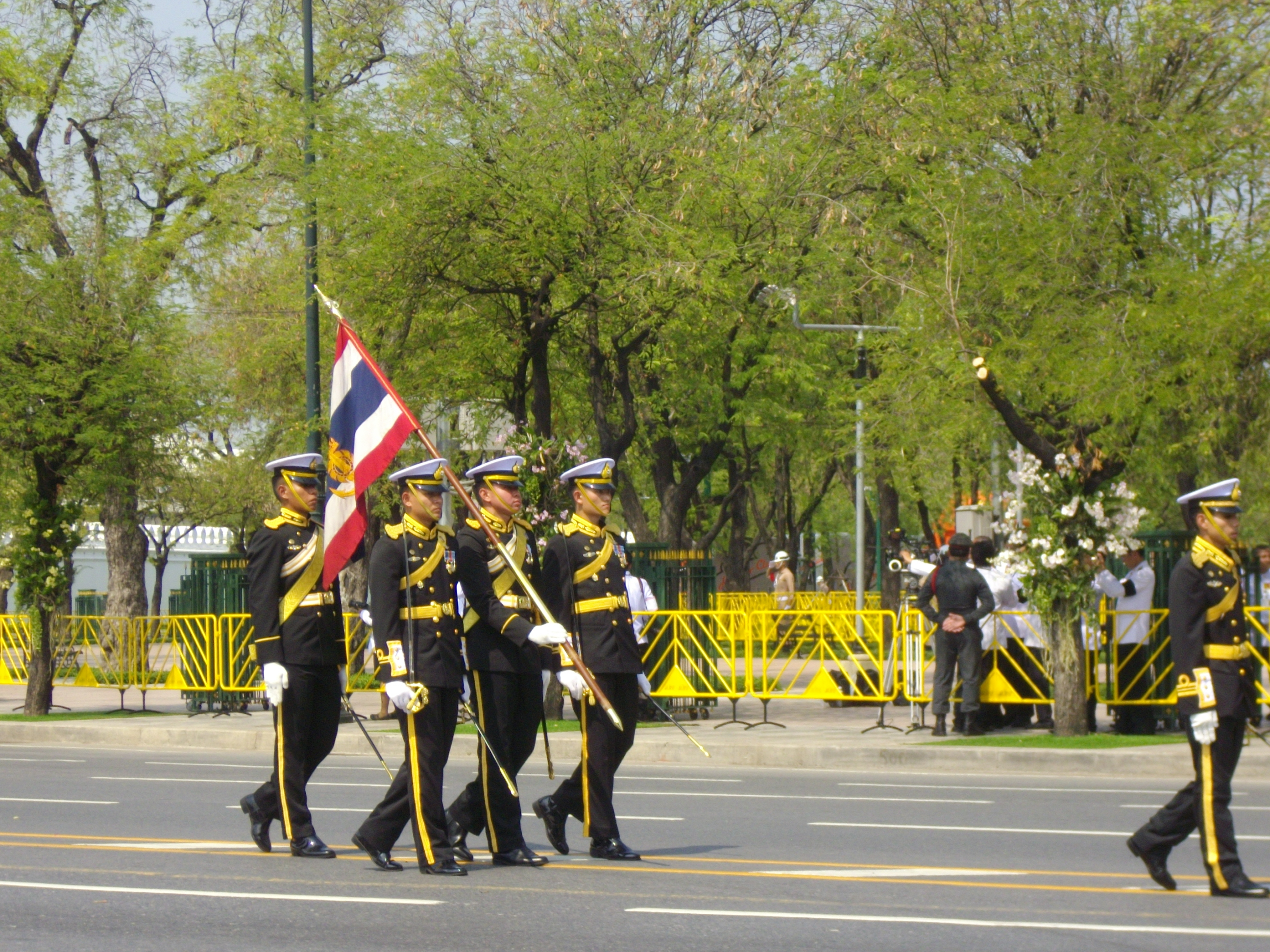
Naval Cadet Regiment, King's Guard

- 1st Cadet Battalion, Naval Cadet Regiment, King's Guard, Royal Thai Naval Academy
- 2nd Cadet Battalion, Naval Cadet Regiment, King's Guard, Royal Thai Naval Academy
- 3rd Cadet Battalion, Naval Cadet Regiment, King's Guard, Royal Thai Naval Academy
- 4th Cadet Battalion, Naval Cadet Regiment, King's Guard, Royal Thai Naval Academy

== Gallery ==
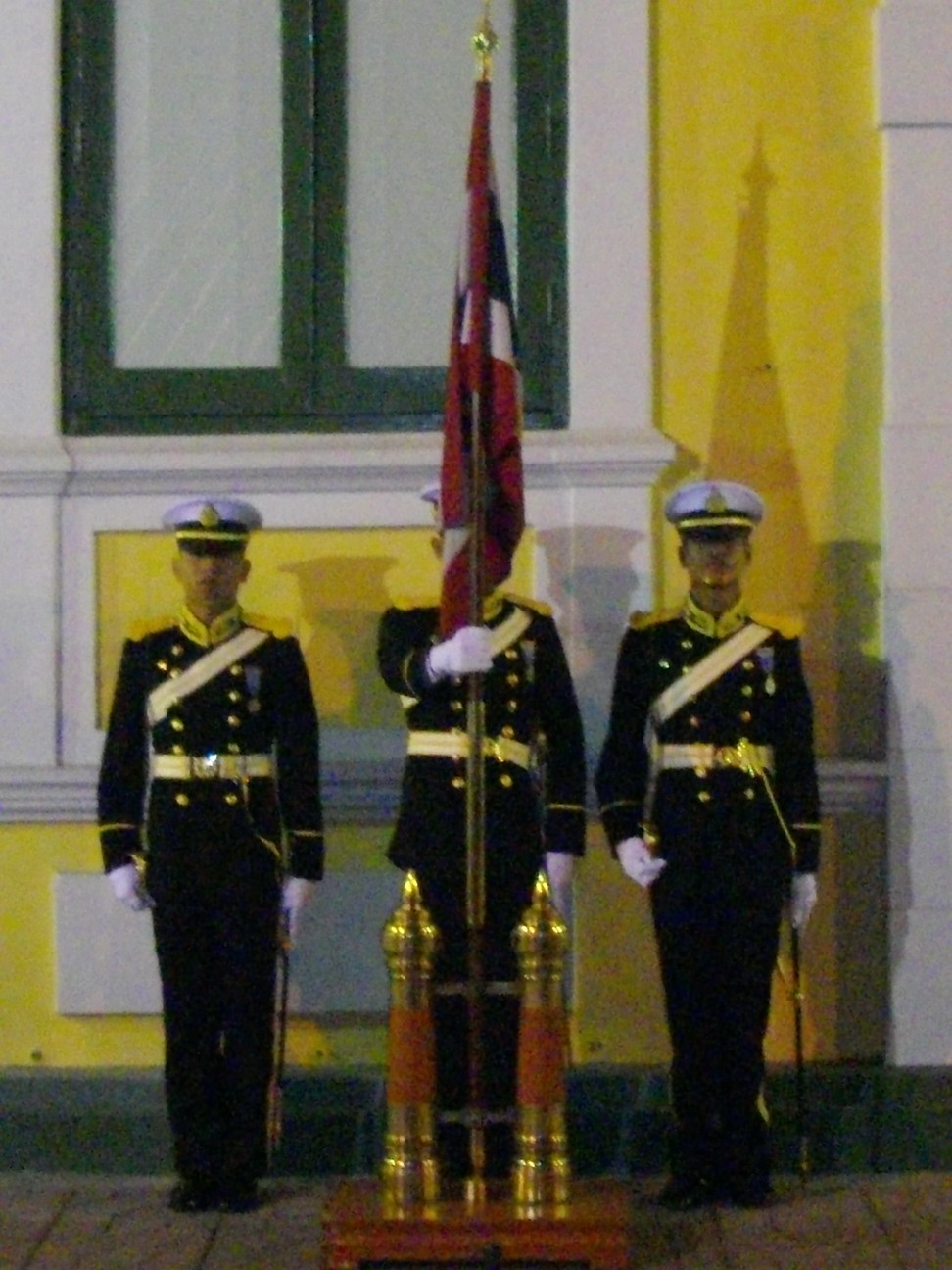
RTNA cadets guarding the colours.

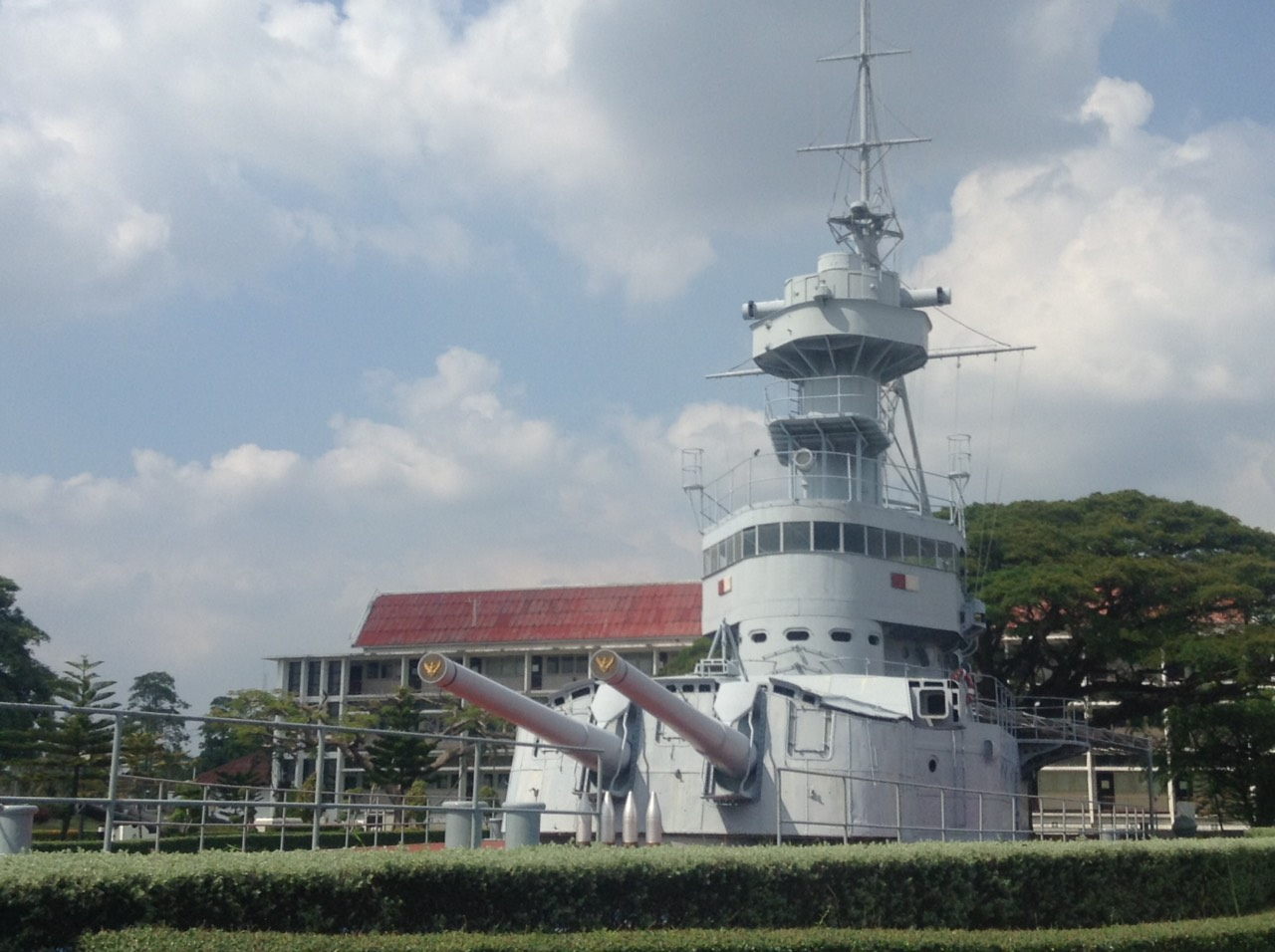
HTMS Thonburi Memorial at the Royal Thai Naval Academy.

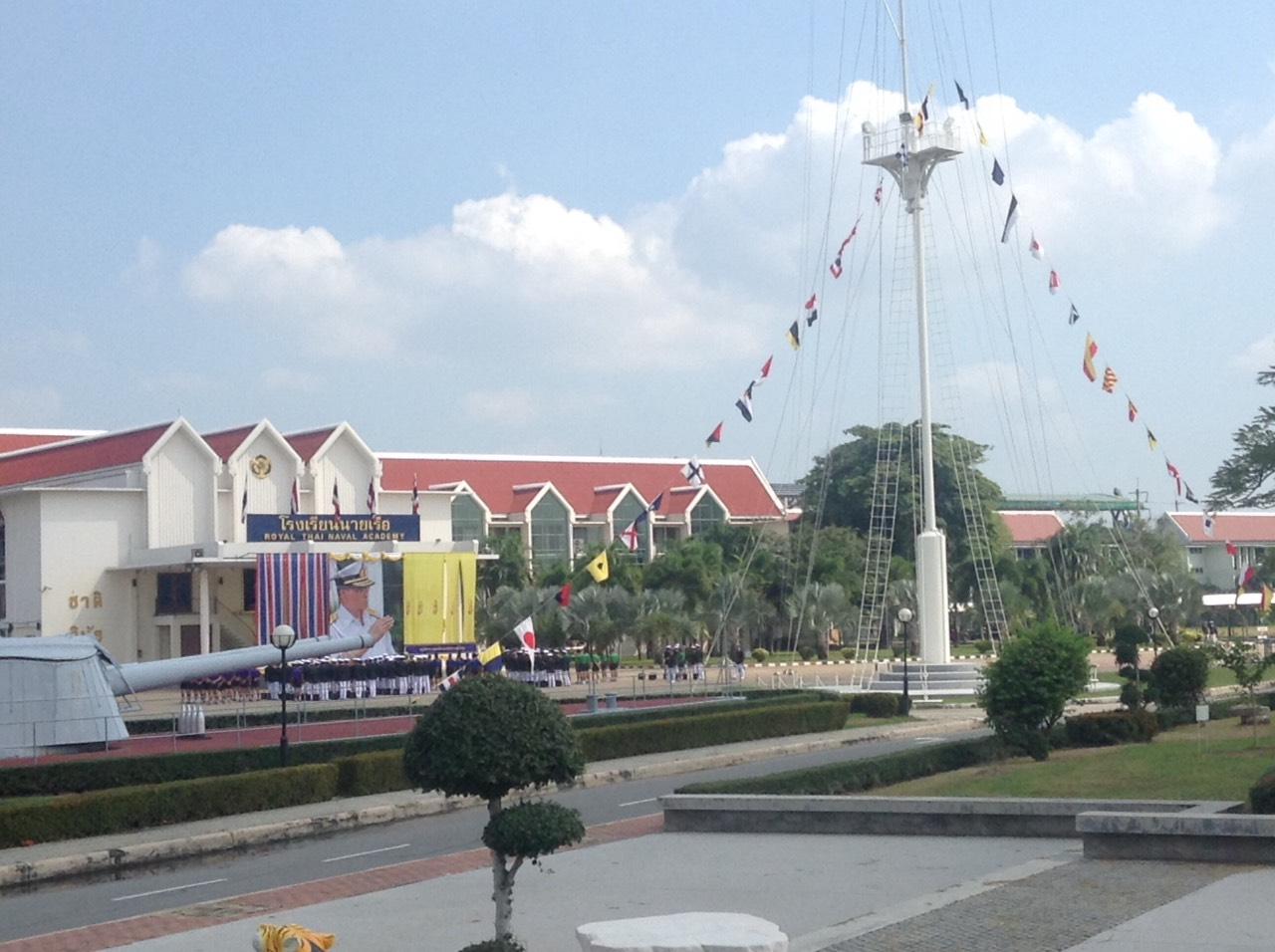
Inside the Royal Thai Naval Academy.

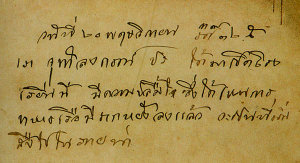
Royal letter of King Rama V in the establishment of the Naval Academy

== See also ==
- Chulachomklao Royal Military Academy
- Navaminda Kasatriyadhiraj Royal Thai Air Force Academy
- Armed Forces Academies Preparatory School
- National Defence College of Thailand
