= Mongolyn Skautyn Kholboo =

National Scouting organization of Mongolia

Mongolyn Skautyn Kholboo Монголын Скаутын Холбоо
- Scout Association of Mongolia
- Country: Mongolia
- Founded: April 16, 1992
- Membership: 13,500
- Chief Commissioner: Erdenejamiyan Erdenebileg
- Affiliation: World Organization of the Scout Movement
- Website http://scout.mn/

The Mongolyn Skautyn Kholboo (Mongolian: Монголын Скаутын Холбоо; Scout Association of Mongolia, MSK), the national Scouting organization of Mongolia, was founded in 1992, and became a member of the World Organization of the Scout Movement in 1994. The coeducational Mongolyn Skautyn Kholboo has 8,822 members as of 2011.

== History ==
Scouting started in the Republic of Mongolia after the fall of the communist regime in 1990 at the initiative of a group of young Mongolian students who created the first Scout troops in Ulaanbaatar, in early 1991. That year, the first Scout troop was organized and 39 Scouts took the oath.

On April 16, 1992, the Mongolyn Skautyn Kholboo was officially founded by Myagmaryn Esunmönkh, (b. September 9, 1970) a professor at Ulaanbaatar University. That year, the first Scout camp was organized near Ulaanbaatar, and 200 Scouts participated. Mongolia is particularly wellsuited for Scouting, with many picturesque places to camp and take part in traditional Scouting activities, and a very young population, where about 40% are children under 16.

Mongolyn Skautyn Kholboo, the Scout Association of Mongolia, was officially recognized and declared the 136th member of the World Organization of the Scout Movement on November 5, 1994. That year, the first Mongolian contingent of 50 Scouts participated in the Asia-Pacific Jamboree, and the first Scout Newsletter was published. In 1995, 45 Mongolian Scouts participated in the World Jamboree in the Netherlands. In 1996, the first Mongolian National Jamboree was held. A Global Development Village was organized during the jamboree. In 1997, Scottish and Mongolian Rovers built the "Children's Development Center". In 1999, Mongolia hosted the 11th Asia Pacific/First Mongolian National Rover Moot. As of 2004, Mongolyn Skautyn Kholboo had 8,209 members, in every province and district of Mongolia. Scouts in Mongolia had a successful third National Jamboree August 10–17, 2004 in the Khentii Mountains in the outskirts of Ulaanbaatar. A total of 1,183 Scouts and 170 staff members came from all provinces of Mongolia and from Ulaanbaatar. From 25 July to 1 August 2016, the Scout Association of Mongolia held the Second International Jamboree, the test-jamboree for the 2017 Asia-Pacific Jamboree (also held in Mongolia), at the Nairamdal Children's Centre, on the outskirts of Ulaanbaatar. Foreign contingents who attended included The Scout Association from the United Kingdom, Scouts of China from Taiwan, and small number of representatives from South Korea, Singapore, Australia, and the United States.

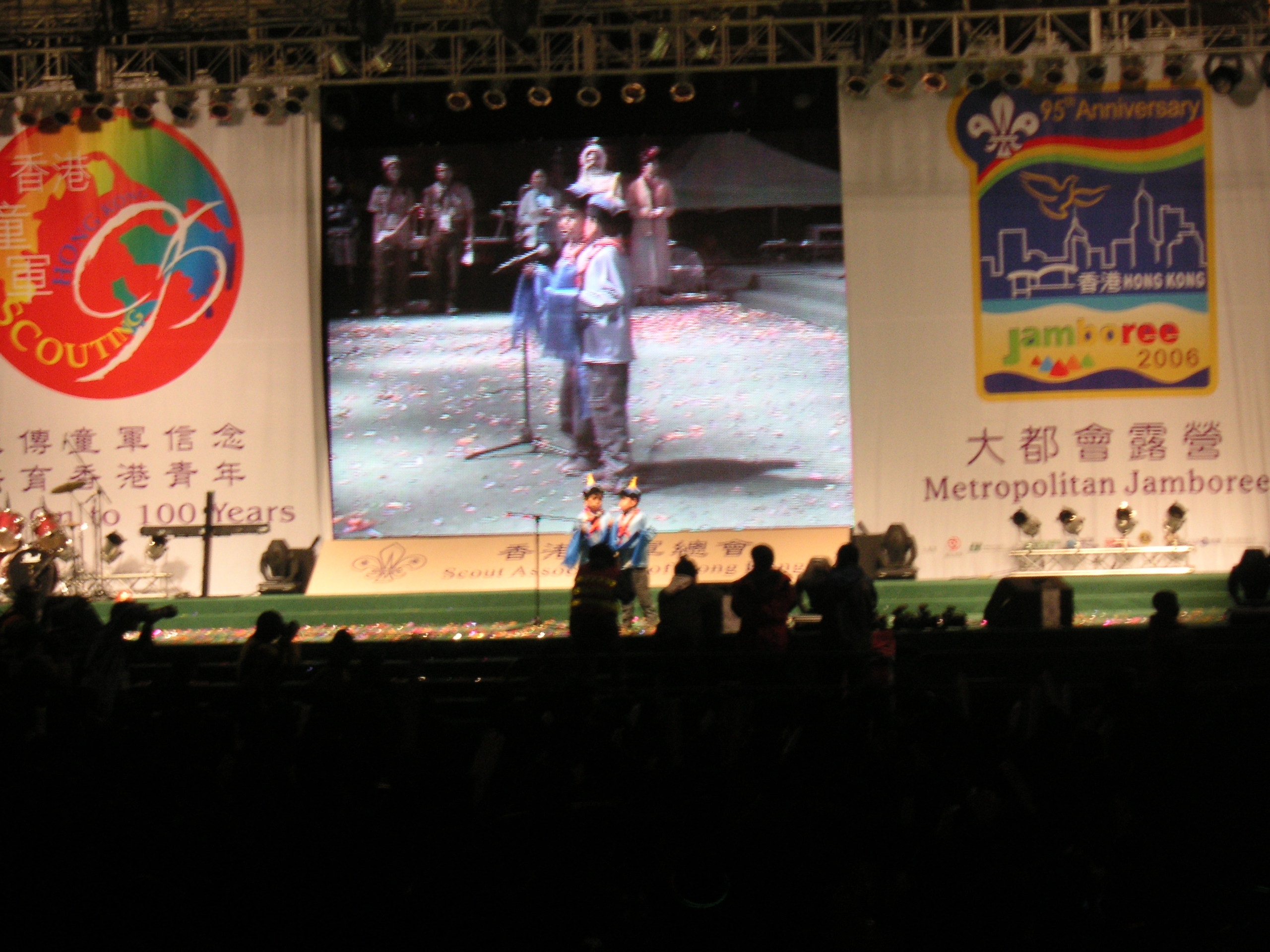
Mongolian Scouts singing in the Metropolitan Jamboree, 2006

Mongolyn Skautyn Kholboo is active in the community and focuses on a variety of charitable causes, in particular, at risk youth and street children. Mongolian Scouts are committed to assisting with the growth of the country during this historic period. The Scouts of Mongolia are presently involved in a national campaign to alleviate poverty, and are focusing their efforts on abandoned children and disabled youth, working in collaboration with the national authorities and with the United Nations agencies active in the country, notably UNICEF. Scouts of Mongolia have a partnership project with Danish Scouting (KFUM).

== Program and ideals ==
- Cubs-ages 7 to 11
- Scouts-Boys and girls ages 12 to 17
- Rovers-ages 17 and older

The Cub Scout Motto is Let's Do Good Things Every Day (equivalent to 'Do A Good Turn Daily'); the Scout Motto is Belen Bol, Be Prepared in Mongol; and the Rover Scout Motto is To Serve.

The Mongol noun for a single Scout is Скаут.

The Scout emblem incorporates elements of the soyombo, the national emblem. Mongolian culture extends even to the light blue Scout uniforms, as light blue is a traditional Central Asian color of courage and generosity.

The Scout Association of Mongolia now runs a street Scout group in Ulaanbaatar starting August 2008. Presently, it has 32 members, 18 boys and 14 girls, ranging from eight to 14 years of age under the guidance of Ariunbold Buuveibaatar as the unit leader, who regularly holds Scouting activities in a school located in Ulaanbaatar.

== New leadership ==
In 2010, Mongolia restructured its national Scouting leadership, now consisting of:

- Chief Commissioner Mr. Erdenejamiayn Erdenebileg
- International Commissioner Mr. Adiyabold Namkhai
- Secretary General Mr. Bayarjargal Damdindagva

== See also ==
- Girl Scout Association of Mongolia
- World Buddhist Scout Brotherhood
