= Scouting and Guiding in Luxembourg =

Scouting and Guiding in Luxembourg is served by several different organizations:

- Scouting in Luxembourg, member of the World Organization of the Scout Movement
  - Fédération Nationale des Eclaireurs et Eclaireuses du Luxembourg
  - Lëtzebuerger Guiden a Scouten, also member of the World Association of Girl Guides and Girl Scouts
- Royal Rangers Luxembourg

Former associations include

- Bureau de Liaison des Associations Guides du Luxembourg
- Association des Girl Guides Luxembourgeoises
