= International Catholic Conference of Scouting =

International organization for Catholic Scouting

- Headquarters: Rome, Italy
- Country: International
- Founded: 1948
- Founders: SJ Jacques Sevin, Graf Count Mario di Carpegna, Professor Jean Corbisier
- Membership: 68 members organisations
- ICCS Chairman: Georges El-Ghorayeb (Lebanon)
- ICCS Secretary General: Christian Larcher (France)
- ICCS World Chaplain: Jacques Gagey (France)
- Website cics.org

The International Catholic Conference of Scouting (ICCS) is an autonomous, international body committed to promoting and supporting Catholic Scout associations and to be a link between the Scout movement and the Catholic Church. Its headquarters is located in Rome, Italy.

It enjoys consultative status with the World Scout Committee and forms the World Scout Inter-religious Forum (WSIF) together with the Council of Protestants in Guiding and Scouting, International Link of Orthodox Christian Scouts, International Union of Muslim Scouts, International Forum of Jewish Scouts, Won-Buddhism Scout and World Buddhist Scout Brotherhood.

There is a close cooperation with the International Catholic Conference of Guiding (ICCG).

It represents about 8 million Scouts.

== History ==
At the 1st World Scout Jamboree in London Father Jacques Sevin SJ of France, Jean Corbisier of Belgium and Count Mario di Carpegna of Italy decided to create an international umbrella for Catholic Boy Scouts. Pope Benedict XV supported this idea and in 1922 Catholic Boy Scouts from Argentina, Austria, Belgium, Chile, Ecuador, France, Italy, Luxembourg, Poland, Spain and Hungary created this umbrella organisation. Its rules were approved by the Pope in the same year. World War II made an end to this organisation. 1946 and 1947 the contacts between the Catholic Scout associations were reestablished and since 1948 conferences took place every year i.e. in 1958 in Vienna.

In June 1962 the Holy See approved the statutes and the Charter of Catholic Scouts, and the umbrella of Catholic Boy Scouting took the name International Catholic Conference of Scouting. In 1977 the new charter was approved by the Holy See.

At the 2011 World Council, the structure of ICCS was modified for 3 years. Instead of a Secretary General, a Chairman and a President (with equal powers) were elected.

== Members ==
=== Africa Region ===
Full members

- Benin: Scoutisme Béninois
- Burundi: Association des Scouts du Burundi
- Chad: Les Scouts du Tchad, component association of the Fédération du Scoutisme Tchadien
- Côte d'Ivoire: Association des Scouts catholiques de Côte d'Ivoire, component association of the Fédération Ivoirienne du Scoutisme
- Cameroon: Les Scouts du Cameroun
- Gabon: Association des Scouts et Guides Catholiques du Gabon, component association of the Fédération Gabonaise du Scoutisme
- Guinée: Association Nationale des Scouts de Guinée
- Madagascar: Antilin'i Madagasikara, component association of the Firaisan'ny Skotisma eto Madagasikara
- Mauritius: Mauritius Scout Association, Bureau Scout Catholique de Maurice
- Rwanda: Association des Scouts du Rwanda
- Senegal: Association des Scouts et Guides du Sénégal, component association of the Confédération Sénégalaise du Scoutisme
- Tanzania: Tanzania Scouts Association, Tanzanian Catholic Conference of Scouting
- Togo: Association Scoute du Togo
- Uganda: The Uganda Scouts Association

Observers:

- Guinea Bissau: Escuteiros da Guiné-Bissau

=== America Region ===
Full members:

- Argentina: Scouts de Argentina, Comisión Pastoral Scout Católica
- Aruba: Scouting Aruba
- Bolivia: Asociación de Scouts de Bolivia
- Brazil: União dos Escoteiros do Brasil
- Chile: Asociación de Guías y Scouts de Chile, Comisión Pastoral
- Colombia: Asociación Scouts de Colombia, Comisión Nacional Pastoral Scout Católica
- Costa Rica: Asociación de Guías y Scouts de Costa Rica
- Curaçao: Scouting Antiano
- Dominican Republic: Asociación de Scouts Dominicanos
- Ecuador: Asociación de Scouts del Ecuador
- Haïti: Scouts d'Haïti
- Mexico: Asociación de Scouts de México
- Panama: Asociación Nacional de Scouts de Panama
- Paraguay: Asociación de Scouts del Paraguay
- Peru: Asociación de Scouts del Perú
- St. Lucia: The Saint Lucia Scout Association
- Uruguay: Movimiento Scout del Uruguay, Comisión Pastoral
- United States: Boy Scouts of America, National Catholic Committee on Scouting

Observers:

- El Salvador: Asociación de Scouts de El Salvador

=== Asia-Pacific Region ===
Full members:

- Hong Kong: The Scout Association of Hong Kong, Catholic Scout Guild
- Japan: Scout Association of Japan, Japan Catholic Conference of Scouting
- South Korea: Korea Scout Association, Catholic Scouts of Korea
- Philippines: Boy Scouts of the Philippines, National Catholic Committee on Scouting
- Singapore: The Singapore Scout Association, Catholic Scouts of Singapore
- Taiwan: The general Association of the Scouts of China, Taiwan Catholic Conference of Scouting
- Thailand: National Scout Organization of Thailand, Ratanakosin Scout Association

Observers:

- Macau: Associação de Escoteiros de Macau

=== European-Mediterranean region ===
Full members:

- Belgium: Scouts en Gidsen Vlaanderen, component association of the Guidisme et Scoutisme en Belgique
- Czech Republic: Junák
- France: Scouts et Guides de France, component association of the Scoutisme Français
- Germany: Deutsche Pfadfinderschaft Sankt Georg, component association of the Ring deutscher Pfadfinderverbände
- Hungary: Magyar Cserkészszövetség, Catholic Committee of the Hungarian Scout Association
- Ireland: Scouting Ireland, Forum for Catholics in Scouting Ireland
- Israel: Catholic Scout Association in Israel, component association of the Israel Boy and Girl Scouts Federation
- Italy: Associazione Guide e Scouts Cattolici Italiani, component association of the Federazione Italiana dello Scautismo
- Jordan: Jordanian Association for Boy Scouts and Girl Guides, Catholic Scouts and Guides – Jordan
- Lebanon: Les Scouts du Liban, component association of the Lebanese Scouting Federation
- Liechtenstein: Pfadfinder und Pfadfinderinnen Liechtensteins
- Luxembourg: Lëtzebuerger Guiden a Scouten, component association of the Luxembourg Boy Scouts Association
- Malta: The Scout Association of Malta
- Monaco: Guides et Scouts de Monaco
- Palestine: Palestinian Scout Association, Palestinian Catholic Scouts of Saint John the Baptist
- Poland: Związek Harcerstwa Polskiego
- Portugal: Corpo Nacional de Escutas, component association of the Federação Escutista de Portugal
- Romania: Organizaţia Naţională Cercetaşii României, Asociaţia Scout Catolică din România
- Slovakia: Slovenský skauting, Slovensky Scouting Catholic Committee
- Spain:
  - Movimiento Scout Católico, component association of the Federación de Escultismo en España
  - Minyons Escoltes i Guies de Catalunya, component association of the Federació Catalana d'Escoltisme i Guiatge
- Switzerland:
  - Gruppo delle Sezioni Scout Cattoliche di Scoutismo Ticino, component association of the Swiss Guide and Scout Movement
  - Verband katholischer Pfadfinderinnen und Pfadfinder, component association of the Swiss Guide and Scout Movement
- United Kingdom: The Scout Association, National Catholic Scout Fellowship
- Ukraine: National Organization of Scouts of Ukraine, Commission of Catholic Scouts

== Activities ==
=== World Scout Conference and Regional Scout Conferences ===
ICCS was represented at the 38th World Scout Conference in Korea. ICCS was also represented at the 14th Africa Scout Conference in Accra in November 2009.

=== World Scout Jamborees and World Scout Moot ===
ICCS is active at World Scout Jamborees. At the 20th World Scout Jamboree i.e. there was a special award issued by ICCS and an order of mass and a song book was published. The ICCS was also involved in the 21st World Scout Jamboree with its own center the Hyland Abbey. ICCS will also be present in 2011 at the World Jamboree in Sweden. ICCS is also an active participant of the World Scout Moot i.e. in 2000 in Mexico.

=== International Scout Ecumenical Encounter ===
The ICCS was an active participant in all the International Ecumenical Scout Encounters:

- 1st International Scout Ecumenical Encounter, Canterbury, England, U.K., 2008
- 2nd International Scout Ecumenical Encounter, Athens, Greece, 2010
- 3rd International Scout Ecumenical Encounter, Assisi, Italy, 2012

=== World Scout Interreligious Symposium ===
ICCS was an active participant of all World Scout Interreligious Symposium:

- 1st World Scout Interreligious Symposium, Valencia, Spain, 2003
- 2nd World Scout Interreligious Symposium, Taiwan, 2006
- 3rd World Scout Inter-religious Symposium, Uganda, 2009
- 4th World Scout Interreligious Symposium, Iksan, South Korea, 2012.
- 5th World Scout Interreligious Symposium, Huntington, New York, USA, 2017.
- 6th World Scout Interreligious Symposium, Marseilles, France, 2026

=== International Scout Week ===
Between August 16 and 23, 2009 a Scout Week took place in Taizé for the first time. 56 Scouts und Scoutleaders from Egypt, Germany, Italy, Lithuania, Portugal, Spain, Czech Republic and Hungary took part in this international week. This event is scheduled for every summer. In 2010 it will take place between August 22 and 29.

=== World Youth Day ===
ICCS not only takes part in the activities of World Scouting, but also supports events of the Catholic Church. So ICCS is present at the World Youth Days. So there was a vigil organised by ICCS, ICCG and AGESCI at the World Youth Day in Rome with thousands of Scouts from all over the world. ICCS will be present at the 15th World Youth Day in August 2010 in Madrid.

=== Trainings and other events ===
ICCS hold regularly courses and camps for Scouts, Scoutleaders and chaplains and regional and world level.i.e. in December 2009 and January 2010 the Living Stones Camp, ICCS World Seminar 2008 in Korea, Pastoral Seminar for Central Europe, ICCS Scout Jamboree in Thailand ...

=== International Awareness recognition ===
This is an opportunity offered by the ICCS to all youth and adult members of the Boy Scouts of America.

== Brotherhood of Saint George ==
The honor society of the International Catholic Conference of Scouting is the Brotherhood of Saint George. Catholic Scoutleaders and Chaplains are honoured by getting the membership.

== Publications ==
- Cahiers, published two times per year in French, English and Spanish
- Circular Letter
- Info, published in French, English and Spanish, two monthly
- Signes, published quarterly in French, English and Spanish

== See also ==
- Religion in Scouting
