= Scouting and Guiding in Lebanon =

The Scout and Guide movement in Lebanon is served by

- Fédération Libanaise des Eclaireuses et des Guides, member of the World Association of Girl Guides and Girl Scouts
- Lebanese Scouting Federation, member of the World Organization of the Scout Movement
- Homenmen Beirut

== Emblems ==
Christian Scouts Association

== See also ==
- Imam al-Mahdi Scouts
- Muslim Scout Association (Lebanon)
