= Hibri =

Hibri is a surname. Notable people with the surname include:

- Azizah Y. al-Hibri, American academic
- Khalil al-Hibri, Lebanese politician and businessman
- Muhammad el-Hibri, Lebanese Scouting Federation
- Toufik El Hibri, one of the primary founders of the Scout movement in Lebanon
