= International Link of Orthodox Christian Scouts =

International body committed to promoting and supporting Orthodox Scout associations

- Country: International
- Website http://www.desmos.info/

The International Link of Orthodox Christian Scouts (DESMOS, from Greek "Δεσμός", bond) is an autonomous, international body committed to promoting and supporting Orthodox Scout associations and to be a link between the Scout movement and Orthodox churches.

It enjoys consultative status with the World Scout Committee and forms the World Scout Inter-religious Forum (WSIF) together with the Council of Protestants in Guiding and Scouting, International Catholic Conference of Scouting, International Union of Muslim Scouts, International Forum of Jewish Scouts, Won-Buddhism Scout and World Buddhist Scout Brotherhood.

== Member organizations ==
- Egypt: Boy and Girl Scouts started 1914 but physically worked by 2012 all over Egypt
- Kuwait: Boy Scouts started 2003- whereas Girl Scouts started at 2018- all over Kuwait
- Armenia: Hayastani Azgayin Skautakan Sharjum Kazmakerputiun
- Bosnia and Herzegovina: Savez izviđača Bosne i Hercegovine (supports by Roman Catholics and Islam)
- Bulgaria: Organizatsia na Bulgarskite Skauty
- Cyprus: Cyprus Scouts Association
- Finland: Suomen Partiolaiset
- Greece: Scouts of Greece
- Israel: Israel Boy and Girl Scouts Federation: Christian Orthodox Scout Association
- Jordan: Jordanian Association for Boy Scouts and Girl Guides: Jordanian Association for Boy Scouts and Girl Guides
- Lebanon: Lebanese Scouting Federation: National Orthodox Scout Association - Scout national orthodoxe
- Moldova: Organizaţia Naţională a Scouţilor din Moldova
- North Macedonia: Sojuz na Izvidnici na Makedonija
- Palestinian Authority: Palestinian Scout Association: Palestinian Orthodox Scouts Association
- Poland: Polish Scouting and Guiding Association
- Romania: Cercetaşii României
- Russia: Russian Association of Scouts/Navigators
- Serbia: Savez Izviđača Srbije
- Uganda: The Uganda Scouts Association: Uganda Orthodox Scouts
- Ukraine: National Organization of Scouts of Ukraine
- United States: Boy Scouts of America: Eastern Orthodox Committee on Scouting

== See also ==
- Religion in Scouting
- Georges El Ghorayeb
