= Religious emblem programs (Scouting America) =

BSA program promoting religious education

Religious emblem
- Knot for Adult Religious Emblem; Knot for Youth Religious Emblem; Devices for Youth Religious Emblem
- Owner: Scouting America
- Country: United States
- Created: 1926
- Website https://www.scouting.org/awards/religious-awards/

A variety of religious emblems programs are used by Scouting America to encourage youth to learn about their faith and to recognize adults who provide significant service to youth in a religious environment. These religious programs are created, administered and awarded by the various religious groups, not Scouting America, but each program must be recognized by the organization.

== Award ==
The award given by the religious organization consists of a unique medal for each program— usually only worn on formal occasions. The award is also recognized by the wear of an embroidered square knot emblem— silver on purple for youth and purple on silver for adults. The knot emblem is universal in that it does not represent any specific religion or religious award program. Each medal is designed and produced by the religious institution, while the knot emblems are produced by Scouting America. Many Protestant churches use The PRAY Program, formerly God and Country, series consisting of God and Me, God and Family, God and Church, and God and Life; although they use the same program, the medals are unique in design according to each denomination.

The youth religious knot may be further identified as to level by the wear of a miniature pin-on device. The first-level program is identified by the Cub Scout device and the second by the Webelos device. The third-level uses the Scouts BSA device. The fourth-level program for Venturers and senior Scouts is recognized by the use of the Venturer device, regardless of the program division of the youth.

== Origins ==
The Scout Law states in part: "A Scout is reverent. He is reverent toward God. He is faithful in his religious duties and respects the convictions of others in matters of custom and religion." The Scouting America "Declaration of Religious Principle" states that "no member can grow into the best kind of citizen without recognizing an obligation of God and, therefore, recognizes the religious element in the training of the member, but it is absolutely nonsectarian in its attitude toward that religious training. Its policy is that the home and organization or group with which the member is connected shall give definite attention to religious life."

The first religious recognition program for Scouts began in 1926 when the Roman Catholic Archdiocese of Los Angeles began the Ad Altare Dei for altar boys who were Scouts. The program was expanded nationally in 1939 and Scouting America approved the medal for uniform wear.

The first Protestant religious emblem program was established in 1943 by the Lutheran church as Pro Deo Et Patria. The Jewish Ner Tamid program began in 1944 and the God and Country program used by several Protestant denominations followed in 1945. The 1948 handbook was the first to include the religious emblem programs and it described Roman Catholic, Jewish, Mormon (LDS), Buddhist, Lutheran and the general Protestant program. As of 2007 there are over 35 religious groups represented by over 75 recognized emblems. The knot for the youth emblems was introduced in 1971 and for the adult emblems in 1973.

== Program approval ==
Prior to 1993, Scouting America simply reviewed the programs developed by each faith. After requests for new awards in 1993, Scouting America established a policy statement outlining requirements for recognition. To gain recognition, a proposed program must be approved by the Scouting America Religious Relationships Committee. The medal or badge design must also be approved and must be different from the emblems of other programs.

=== Programs of Religious Activities with Youth ===
Programs of Religious Activities with Youth, more commonly known as P.R.A.Y., is a not-for-profit organization that administers a series of religious recognitions programs that may be used by agencies such as Scouting America, Girl Scouts of the USA, Camp Fire, American Heritage Girls, and other youth groups.

P.R.A.Y. consists of a national board and a business office. The national board of directors is a Christian organization with representatives from churches and national youth agencies. The board develops the curriculum and establishes guidelines for the P.R.A.Y. Program—formerly the God and Country program—used by many Protestant churches. The P.R.A.Y. business office processes orders for the medals and reference materials used in The PRAY Program and the programs of other religious organizations.

Other religious organizations have requested that the P.R.A.Y. business office administer their awards since they handle religious recognitions orders on a full-time basis. The requests are taken to the board of directors for consideration on a case-by-case basis. The religious organizations which contract with the P.R.A.Y. business office retain all responsibility for curriculum development and establishing program guidelines, and the P.R.A.Y. business office processes their orders. Thus, P.R.A.Y. has become an interfaith resource.

Each agency determines which P.R.A.Y.-administered programs meet their standards before giving their recognition. All of the BSA recognized programs are listed through P.R.A.Y., regardless of whether they are administered by P.R.A.Y.

=== Other youth agencies ===
Members of Scouting America who earned a religious emblem through another youth agency such as the Girl Scouts of the USA, Camp Fire USA or a Sunday school group may wear the emblem on their Scouting America uniform. They may also wear the square knot insignia without a device.

=== Smaller programs ===
The Covenant of the Goddess is one of the oldest and largest cross-traditional groups among Wiccans and neopagans. In the early 1990s, they created the Over the Moon and the Hart and Crescent programs for youth and the Distinguished Youth Service Award for adults. The Covenant of the Goddess approached Scouting America for recognition of these programs. Scouting America declined and later adopted the policy requiring that a religious group must first charter at least 25 Scouting America units before its religious awards program may be recognized. P.R.A.Y. currently does not list any of the Covenant of the Goddess religious programs. The policy requiring a religious group to charter at least 25 Scouting units before its religious awards can be recognized is no longer in place.

== Approved programs and awards ==
The following awards are recognized by Scouting America and the religious emblems knot may be worn upon completion of the program.

Faith Proponent association	Cub Scout	Webelos Scout	Boy Scout	Venturer	Adult recognition
African Methodist Episcopal Church P.R.A.Y.	God and Me	God and Family	God and Church	God and Life	God and Service
African Methodist Episcopal Zion Church P.R.A.Y.	God and Me	God and Family	God and Church	God and Life	God and Service
Anglican Catholic Church	Ad te Domine		Serbus Dei		The Order of St. Michael
Anglican Church in North America P.R.A.Y., Anglican Scouting North America	God and Me	God and Family	God and Church	God and Life	St. George Cross
Armenian Apostolic Church of America (Western Prelacy)	none		Saint Mesrob		none
Armenian Church of America (Eastern Diocese)	Saint Gregory		Ararat		none
Baháʼí Baháʼí Committee on Scouting	Unity of Mankind				Service to Humanity
Baptist P.R.A.Y., Association of Baptists for Scouting	God and Me	God and Family	God and Church	God and Life	Good Shepherd
Buddhist National Buddhist Committee on Scouting	Metta		Sangha		Bodhi
Catholic (Eastern) National Catholic Committee on Scouting	Light of Christ (Tigers and Wolves)	Parvuli Dei (Bears and Webelos)	Light Is Life	Pope Pius XII	Bronze Pelican; Saint George
Catholic (Latin) National Catholic Committee on Scouting	Light of Christ (Tigers and Wolves)	Parvuli Dei (Bears and Webelos)	Ad Altare Dei	Pope Pius XII	Bronze Pelican; Saint George
Christian Church (Disciples of Christ) P.R.A.Y.	God and Me	God and Family	God and Church	God and Life	God and Service
Christian Methodist Episcopal Church P.R.A.Y.	God and Me	God and Family	God and Church	God and Life	God and Service
Church of Christ, Scientist P.R.A.Y., Christian Science	God and Country				God and Service
The Church of Jesus Christ of Latter-day Saints Boy Scouts of America LDS Relationships	Faith in God		On My Honor (Youth)		On My Honor (Adult)
Churches of Christ Members of Churches of Christ for Scouting	Loving Servant	Joyful Servant	Good Servant (Ages 11 – 13) Giving Servant (Ages 13 – 18)	Giving Servant	Faithful Servant
Community of Christ World Community Program	God and Me (grades 1–3)	Light of the World	Path of the Disciple	Exploring Community Together	International Youth Service Award
Eastern Orthodox Eastern Orthodox Committee on Scouting	Saint George	Chi Rho	Alpha Omega		Prophet Elias
Episcopal National Episcopal Scouters Association	God and Me	God and Family	God and Church	God and Life	Saint George Episcopal
General Church of the New Jerusalem (The New Church) Boy Scout Relations Committee	Ten Commandments Award		Open Word Award		
Hindu North American Hindu Association	Dharma		Dharma (-grade 8); Karma (grade 8-)	Karma	Dharma Saathi; Karma Saathi; Dharma Bhakta; Karma Bhakta
Islamic National Islamic Committee on Scouting	Bismillah		In the Name of God		Allaho Akber
Jainism Federation of Jain Associations in North America	Live Help Live Stage 1	Live Help LiveStage 2	Live Help Live Stage 3	Live Help Live Stage 4	Jain Scout Gold Medal
Jewish National Jewish Committee on Scouting	Maccabee (Tiger Cubs) / Aleph	Aleph	Ner Tamid	Etz Chaim	Shofar
Lutheranism National Lutheran Association on Scouting	God and Me	God and Family	God and Church	Lutheran God and Life	Servant of Youth (age 23+); Lamb (age 28+)
Meher Baba Committee for Meher Baba and Scouting	Love for God		Compassionate Father		The Ancient One
Moravian Church	none		God and Country		The Order of David Zeisberger
National Association of Anglican and Traditional Catholic Scouters P.R.A.Y.	God and Me	God and Family	God and Church	God and Life	God and Service
Church of the Nazarene P.R.A.Y.	God and Me	God and Family	God and Church	God and Life	God and Service
Polish National Catholic Church	Love of God (Miłość Boga)		God and Country (Bóg I Ojczyzna)		Bishop Thaddeus F. Zielinski
Presbyterian Church in America P.R.A.Y.	God and Me	God and Family	God and Church	God and Life	God and Service
Presbyterian Church (U.S.A.) National Association of Presbyterian Scouters	God and Me	God and Family	God and Church	God and Life	God and Service
Protestant and Independent Christian Churches (Note: Denominations that use this include: Assemblies of God, Church of God, Church of the Nazarene, Pentecostal, Reformed and United Church of Christ.) P.R.A.Y.	Jesus & Me (Lions-Tigers); God & Me (Wolves-Bears)	God and Family	God and Church	God and Life	God and Service
Religious Society of Friends Friends Committee on Scouting	That of God		Spirit of Truth		Friends
The Salvation Army	God and Me	God and Family; Silver Crest	God and Church	God and Life	Scouter's Award
Sikhism World Sikh Council – America Region (WSC-AR)	Nirbhau	Nirvair	Gyan Kharg	Khalsa	Sewadar
Unitarian Universalist Association See Unitarian Universalist	Love and Help	Love and Help	Religion in Life	None	None
United Church of Christ P.R.A.Y.	God and Me	God and Family	God and Church	God and Life	God and Service
United Methodist National Association of United Methodist Scouters	God and Me	God and Family	God and Church	God and Life	God and Service
United Pentecostal Church International	God and Me	God and Family	God and Church	God and Life	God and Service
Unity Churches	God in Me	Light of God		Fillmore Youth Award	Distinguished Youth Service
Zoroastrian	none		Good Life		none

While optional, the programs may be used to fulfill certain requirements of the Cub Scout Bear and Webelos ranks, the Venturing Religious Life Bronze Award and the Venturing TRUST Award. Instruction for these programs is provided by the religious organization; unit leaders are involved only if they are also part of the religious organization. Many of the religious programs involve the youth's parents.

Many of the religious organizations also have awards for adult BSA members; however, these awards are almost always recognition for service to the religion within Scouting. The adults are nominated for the award; they do not go through a program.

== Other awards ==
P.R.A.Y. has developed several other awards that are not specifically recognized by Scouting America. Mentors may be recognized by a pin or pendant that may be worn on non-Scouting apparel. There is also a four-star recognition pin for youth who have earned all four levels of their program. Other groups may have similar awards for individuals and units that are not listed through P.R.A.Y. If approved by the local council, they may be worn as temporary insignia on the right pocket of the Scout uniform.

P.R.A.Y. also offers its own "Duty to God" segment patch program for Scouts of all ages and adult advisers of all faiths, designed to promote their religious awards programs. To earn the patch, girls and adults must attend or make an interfaith presentation about religious awards, then fulfill a personal commitment of their choice that fulfills their "duty to God" as promised in the Scout Oath, such as promoting, earning, or helping another girl earn the religious award for her faith. There are four segments for the patch. One is offered yearly, called the "anchor patch", while the other three are offered yearly on a rotational basis. After one patch is released, the previous year's patch is discontinued for the next three years, then is reinstated again for a one-year period. As of August 2008, only two of these three patches have been released.

== National Association of Presbyterian Scouters ==
The Celtic Cross award is given to adults active as a youth leader associated with a Presbyterian Church program, including Scouting America youth leaders and any other group or organization that chooses to give the award. To receive the award an adult must demonstrate "exceptional Christian character", or has given faithful service to a youth program(s) of a congregation by serving in church leadership positions.

== Unitarian Universalist ==
=== Unitarian Universalist Association ===
The Unitarian Universalist Association (UUA)—the religious association of most Unitarian Universalist congregations in the United States—has two religious emblems programs that are recognized by the BSA.

==== History ====
In 1992 the UUA Board of Trustees approved a resolution opposing Scouting America’s policies on homosexuals, atheists and agnostics; and in 1993, the UUA updated Religion in Life to include criticism of these policies.

In 1998, Scouting America withdrew recognition of Religion in Life, stating that such information was incompatible with Scouting America programs. They also removed recognition of Love and Help, the program for Cub Scouts though it contained no mention of the policies. The UUA removed the material from their curriculum and Scouting America renewed their recognition of the programs. When Scouting America found that the UUA was issuing supplemental material with the Religion in Life workbooks that included statements critical of discrimination on the basis of sexual orientation or personal religious viewpoint, the organization again withdrew recognition.

=== Unitarian Universalist Scouters Organization ===
The Unitarian Universalist Scouters Organization (UUSO) is an association of UU Scouts who offer religious emblem programs that are recognized by the BSA but not by the UUA.

==== History ====
The UUSO created the Living Your Religion program in May 2005 as a parallel award for Scouts of the Unitarian faith. It was announced by P.R.A.Y. in the first quarter of 2005 that Scouting America had accepted the Living your Religion award, but this was later redacted. The program was promoted at the 2005 National Scout Jamboree and shown as having Scouting America approval in the UUSO membership brochure and the Living Your Religion Guidebook. The UUA had stated that the UUSO is not recognized as an affiliate organization. The UUSO released the Religion and Family program for Webelos Scouts in February 2008.

=== Unitarian Universalist Association ===
The Unitarian Universalist Association signed a Memorandum of Understanding with the Boy Scouts of America in March 2016 that reestablished the relationship, approving religious award programs for Cub Scouts and Scouts BSA as well as establishing a foundation for Unitarian Universalist congregations to charter Scout units. The Cub Scout religious award is called "Love and Help". The Scouts BSA religious award is called "Religion in Life".

See Approved programs and awards

== See also ==
- Religion in Scouting
- Scout Sunday or Scout Sabbath
- Religious emblems programs (Girl Scouts of the USA)
