= Religion in Scouting =

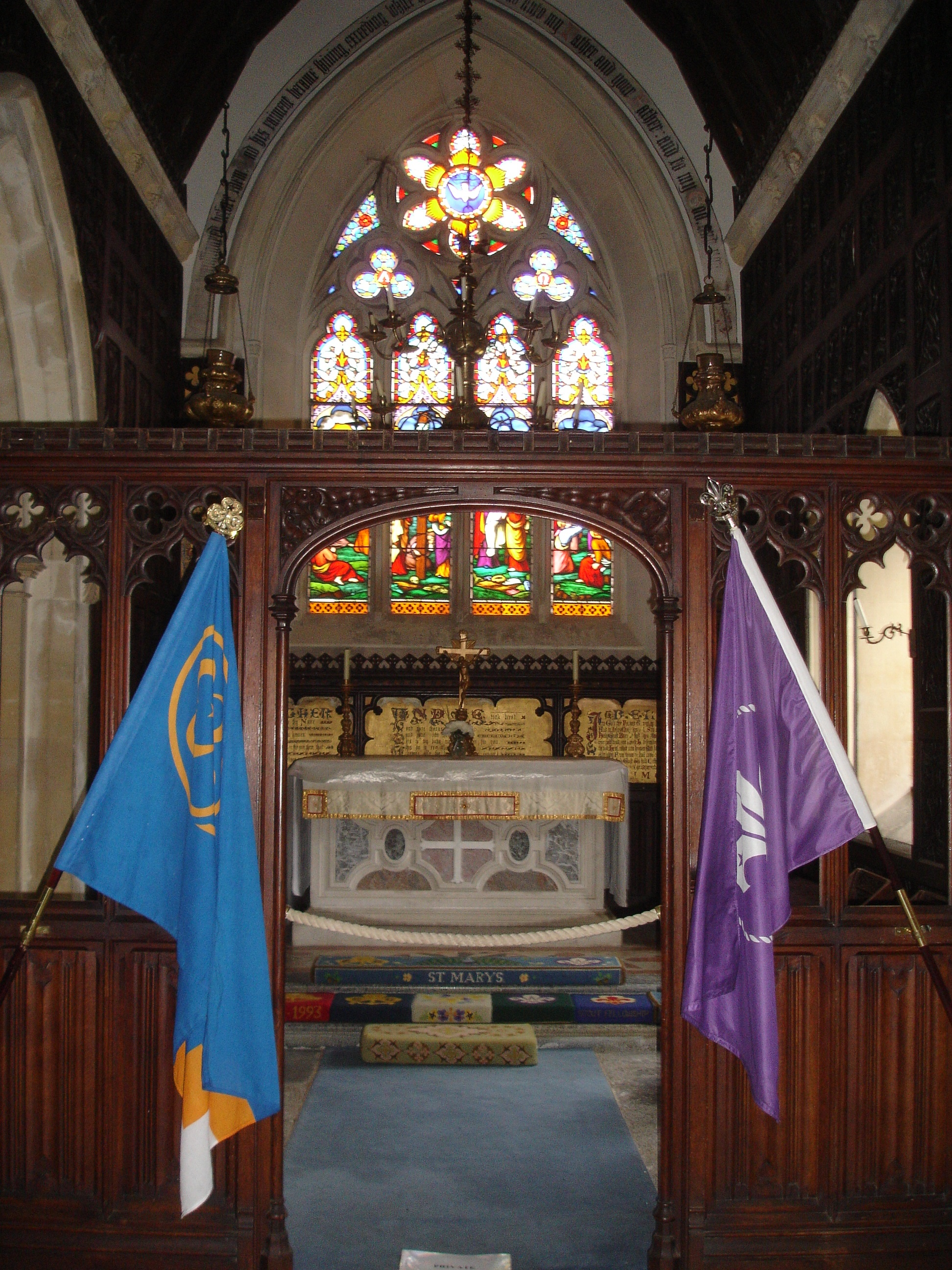
- Scouting and Guiding flags in St Mary's Church, Brownsea Island

Religion in Scouting and the Girl Guides is an element of the Scout method. It has been given different interpretations and practiced differently by different Scout organizations over the years. The Scout Movement is separate from any particular faith or religion but the Scout Promise holds to spirituality and a belief in a higher power.

Increasing secularism and religious diversity has caused misunderstandings and controversies in some of Scout organizations.

== Views of religion's place in Scouting ==
=== Founder's views ===
When creating the Scouting method, Baden-Powell was adamant that there was a place for God within it.

In Scouting for Boys, Baden-Powell wrote specifically about Christianity:

We aim for the practice of Christianity in their everyday life and dealings, and not merely the profession of theology on Sundays…

Indeed, the Scout Promise as originally written by Baden-Powell states that a Scout does his "duty to God".

However, the founder's position moved shortly after the Scout movement began to grow rapidly around the world, and his writings and speeches allowed for all religions. He did continue to emphasise that religion was a part of a Scout's life, without dictating a particular faith:

When asked where religion came into Scouting and Guiding, Baden-Powell replied, It does not come in at all. It is already there. It is a fundamental factor underlying Scouting and Guiding.

Though we hold no brief for any one form of belief over another, we see a way to helping all by carrying the same principle into practice as is now being employed in other branches of education…

Take a negative instance. A Mohammedan Guider comes to England and addresses a lot of Girl Guides on religion, in the course of which she quotes Mahomet as the one divine teacher. This in spite of the fact that her audience are believers in Christ. How would you regard her action? As tactless, as insulting, as fanatical? At any rate it wouldn't be exactly polite or in accordance with our laws of courtesy. Yet I have known Christian Guiders as well as Scouters do exactly the same thing with Jews or Hindoos or people of other beliefs present, and these on their part have sat under it, too polite to raise objections but none the less made uncomfortable by it. Once, at a mixed gathering at a 'Scout's Own' a speaker carefully avoided much reference to Christ and was accused by some there of 'denying Him'. His defence was that he was rather following Christ in that he was showing Christian deference to the feelings of others who, equally with himself, were sons of one Father, under whatever form they rendered homage to God.

Baden-Powell's gravestone bears no cross or other religious symbol. Rather, in addition to the Boy Scout and Girl Guide Badges, it bears a circle with a dot in the centre, the trail sign for "Going home" or "I have gone home":.

=== World scouting organizations today ===
==== Principles ====
Religion and spirituality is still a key part of the Scouting method but the two major world organizations have slightly different interpretations.

- The World Organization of the Scout Movement (WOSM) states the following in its Fundamental Principles:

Under the title "Duty to God", the first of the above-mentioned principles of the Scout Movement is defined as "adherence to spiritual principles, loyalty to the religion that expresses them and acceptance of the duties resulting therefrom". Note that, by contrast to the title, the body of the text omits the word "God" to make clear that the clause also covers non-monotheistic religions, such as Hinduism, and those that do not recognize a personal God, such as Buddhism.

- The World Association of Girl Guides and Girl Scouts (WAGGGS) stated the following in the 21st World Conference in 1972:

The essence of Duty to God is the acknowledgement of the necessity for a search for a faith in God, in a Supreme Being, and the acknowledgment of a force higher than man of the highest Spiritual Principles.

==== Global interpretation ====
Despite the principles outlined above, questions have still arisen in the early 21st century about the need for a strict adherence to a Scout Promise or Law which contains an explicit statement of "duty to God" or religion. In 2014, the WOSM passed a resolution, "Spirituality in Scouting", recognizing the importance of spirituality, but without defining it with the word "God". The WOSM then convened a 2015 "Duty to God" task force, which in turn produced another draft resolution to be considered at the WOSM 2017 conference. The final resolution passed indicated a need for further investigation, and for WOSM to take into consideration a member organization's "culture and civilization" if asked to approve changes to their Promise or Law. Conversely, a member organization was asked to consider the global movement and its goals if it requested alternative wording.

Scouts Australia and Scouts Canada (to name two) have since included alternative Promise wording for use in their organizations by their members.

==== National interpretation ====
National organizations may further define their interpretations of the Scouting Principles. For instance, the current Religious Policy of The Scout Association of the United Kingdom states that members should "make every effort to progress in the understanding and observance of the Promise to do their best to do their duty to God or to uphold Scouting’s values as appropriate".

Many Scout/Guide groups are supported by local religious bodies, including Christian, Islamic, Jewish and Sikh communities. These local groups often have a more strict interpretation on the original writings of Baden-Powell concerning religion. However, since they often belong to national organizations that are not of a specific religion, there are usually groups in the neighbourhood that have a less strict interpretation.

Additionally, some national organizations are aimed at the adherents of a specific religion, but there usually are other Scouting/Guiding organizations within that country that are more open or have a more neutral point of view concerning religion.

The Scout Promise is easily adapted to accommodate these, and other, faiths. For example, in its section on the Girl Scout Promise and Law, the website of the Girl Scouts of the USA (GSUSA) includes a note that:

The word "God" [in the Promise] can be interpreted in a number of ways, depending on one's spiritual beliefs. When reciting the Girl Scout Promise, it is okay to replace the word "God" with whatever word your spiritual beliefs dictate.

== Membership requirements ==
The WOSM "duty to God" principle has evolved and been clarified by resolutions in their conferences in the early 21st century. There are Scouting associations in some countries, such as France and Denmark, that are segregated on the basis of religious belief. In other organizations, alternative Promises have been requested for optional use among their members.

=== Boy Scouts of America ===
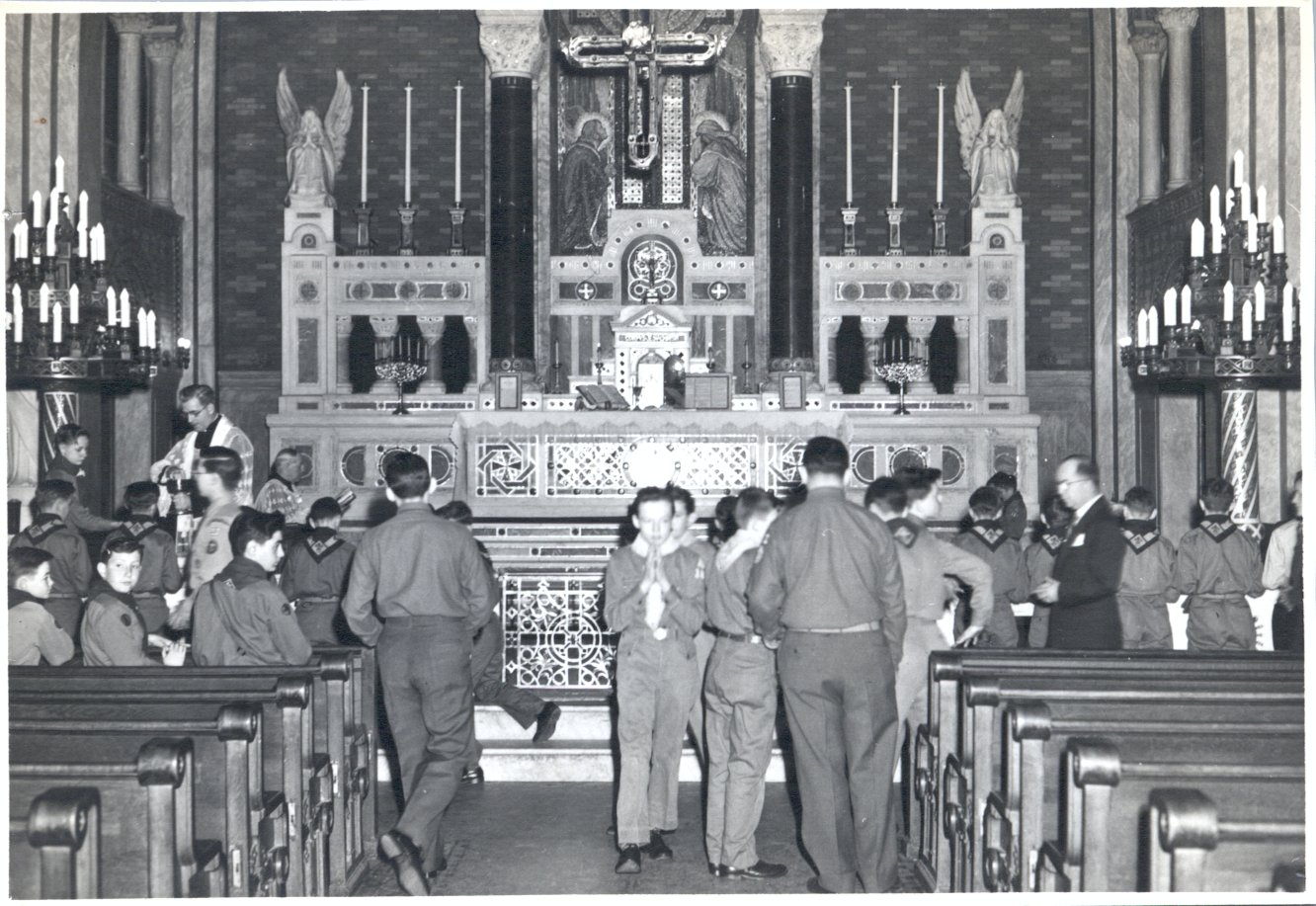
Scout Sunday service at the St Francis de Sales parish, Philadelphia, 1949

The Boy Scouts of America have been non-sectarian in their application of a Scout is Reverent.

Declaration of Religious Principle. The Boy Scouts of America maintains that no member can grow into the best kind of citizen without recognizing an obligation to God. In the first part of the Scout Oath or Promise the member declares, "On my honor I will do my best to do my duty to God and my country and to obey the Scout Law." The recognition of God as the ruling and leading power in the universe and the grateful acknowledgment of his favors and blessings are necessary to the best type of citizenship and are wholesome precepts in the education of the growing members.

The Boy Scouts of America has accepted Buddhist members and units since 1920, and also accepts members of various pantheistic faiths. Many Buddhists do not believe in a supreme being or creator deity, but because Buddhism is still considered religious and spiritual in nature by the BSA, their membership is deemed acceptable, provided the scouting troop leaders subscribe to the BSA Declaration of Religious Principle as they interpret it.

In March 2016, the BSA signed a Memorandum of Understanding (MOU) with the Unitarian Universalist Association (UUA) after many years of dispute between the BSA and the UUA. While declaring that "all youth members and adult leaders of the BSA must subscribe to the Declaration of Religious Principle in the BSA's Bylaws", the MOU gives any Unitarian Universalist congregation the absolute authority over all phases of the program that affect the spiritual welfare of those who participate in Scouting programs sponsored by a Unitarian Universalist congregation. The MOU specifically mentions Humanism and Earth-centered traditions as being acceptable faiths in Scouting programs chartered by Unitarian Universalist congregations. This MOU may allow for atheist and agnostic members to join the BSA through Scout units chartered by Unitarian Universalist congregations. As part of the agreement in the MOU, BSA recognition of the religious emblems developed by the Unitarian Universalist Association was reinstated as of May 2016.

The BSA policy excludes atheists and agnostics. The BSA has come under strong criticism over the past years due to their religious policy and stance against agnostics and atheists.

=== Scouts Canada ===
Scouts Canada, as of Summer 2020, has updated their Values statement to include alternate versions of various Scout divisions' promises, one which makes explicit reference to God, and one which does not. As stated on their website, "The development of an additional Scout Promise comes as a pragmatic response to membership feedback and a desire for greater flexibility and inclusivity."

As part of its greater Canadian Path program, Scouts Canada has a "Religion in Life" emblem that is awarded upon completion of a particular denomination's program by a Scout. In 2009, a "Spirituality Award" for Scouts and Guides who did not belong to any denomination was also established.

=== Girl Guides of Canada ===
Girl Guides of Canada suggested a new version of their Promise that uses "my beliefs" instead of a direct references to God in 2009. The new Promise was approved in 2010.

=== Scouts Australia ===
Scouts Australia's Policy and Rules states that "Scouts Australia upholds the Principle of 'Duty to God' through facilitating development of one’s 'Spiritual Beliefs'." A further interpretation of this clause appears on their website: "Religion is still a central part of life for many, though there is also an increasing group for whom this isn’t the case. Scouting is open to all. We promote an individual approach to focusing on the exploration of our own beliefs and the use of reflections to make sense of our place in the world." Beginning in August 2017, Scouts Australia provides the option to use one of two different versions of the Scout Promise,"On my honour, I promise To do my best, To be true to my spiritual beliefs, To contribute to my community and our world, To help other people, And to live by the Scout Law." The other option is "On my honour I promise that I will do my best, To do my duty to my God, and To the King of Australia, To help other people, And to live by the Scout Law.."

=== Girl Guides Australia ===
In 2012, the promise was reworded to have to "develop my beliefs" instead of a direct reference to God.

=== The Scout Association in the United Kingdom ===
The Scout Association of the United Kingdom allows members of any religion, or no religion at all. Leaders, like all members, are not expected to be a member of any particular faith nor hold any religious belief of their own. They are, however, expected to abide by the Association's religious policy which promotes mutual acceptance of beliefs within the Movement such as by encouraging young Scouts to explore their own beliefs as well as making general provisions and considerations for members, such as giving them advice and guidance and allowing for the observance of religious practices within the Group. Previous to January 2014 it was necessary for all members of the Association to hold a faith, however this is no longer the case. Scouts of religions other than Christianity can choose from a selection of alternatively worded promises. Scouts of no religion can choose to make a promise that replaces "duty to God" with "to uphold our Scout values" followed by "to do my duty to the King". Any member making their Promise can choose which version of the Promise they wish to use. (Note: Current versions are for members who are atheist or of no faith background, who are Buddhist, Christian, Hindu, Humanist, Jewish, Muslim and Sikh. The wording of the Christian and Jewish versions of the promise is the same.)

The change in policy followed a consultation conducted in 2012 to gauge support among members for an alternate atheist Scout promise, removing the invocation of a deity. At the same time, the Guide Association, the parallel movement which began two years later, is to launch a consultation about its very similar promise, with views sought on all parts of the wording from early January. TSA UK chief commissioner Wayne Bulpitt said religion would remain "a key element" even if a new variant of the promise was approved. Julie Bentley, chief executive of the Guide Association, said its consultation would begin on 3 January.

From 1 September 2013 Girl Guiding UK introduced a new promise, in which members promise 'to be true to myself and develop my beliefs' replacing 'to love my God'.

=== Non-aligned Scouting organizations ===
Approaches toward religion vary considerably in Scouting organizations not aligned with WOSM and WAGGGS. For example, the website of Camp Fire states "We are inclusive, welcoming children, youth and adults regardless of race, religion, socioeconomic status, disability, sexual orientation or other aspect of diversity". On the other hand, the American Heritage Girls are explicitly Christian and require all adult leaders to adhere to a specific Statement of Faith. Indeed, the AHG was founded by parents who did not agree with the Girl Scouts' decision to allow other words to be substituted for "God" in the Promise (see above) and the GSUSA's official lack of membership policies based on sexual orientation.

== Current practises ==
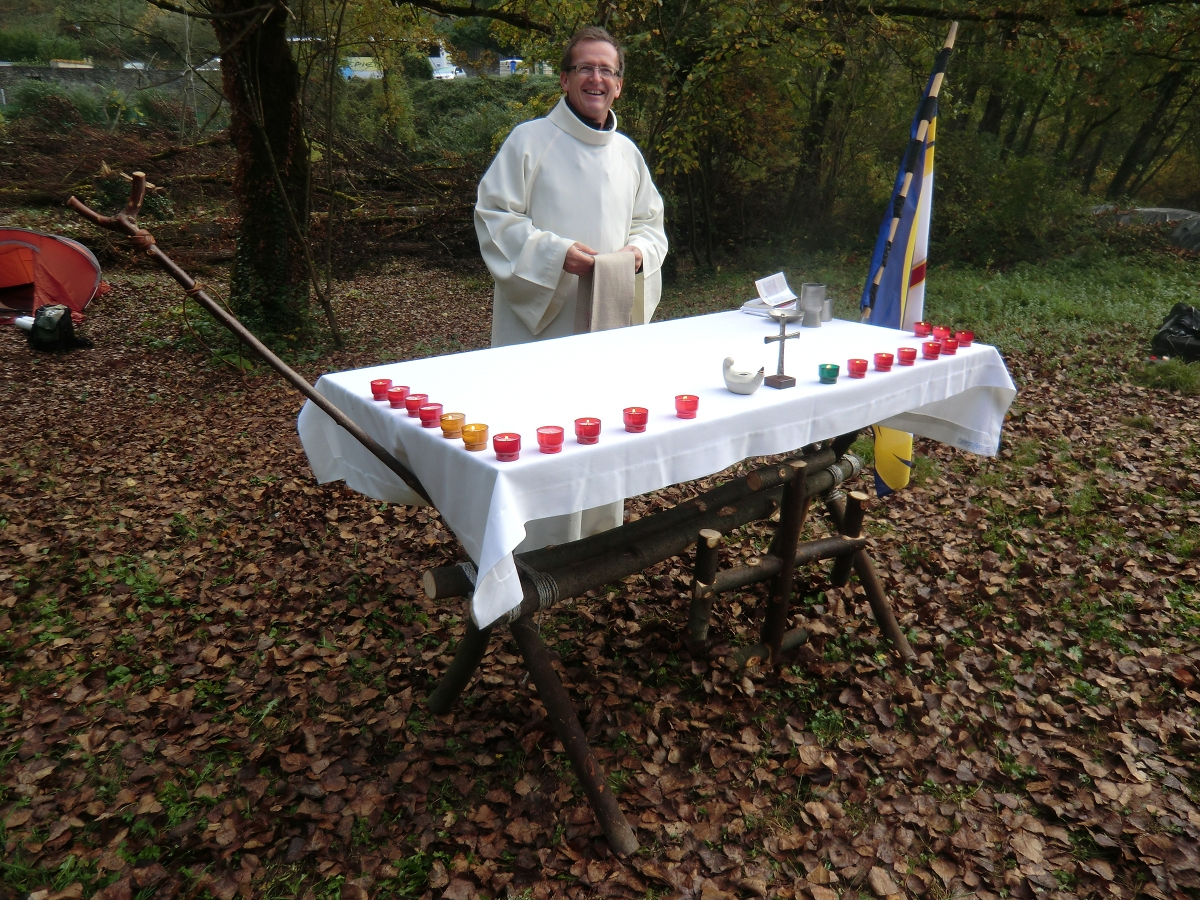
Jacques Gagey, Chaplain General of Scouts et Guides de France with an altar built with pioneering techniques

Some Scouting organisations have many obligatory religious merit badges as a way of fulfilling a requirement for a rank and others have a single voluntary religious merit badge or none at all. Scouting organisations may recognise religious programs run by other organizations, like the religious emblems programmes in the United States and Canada.

=== Austria ===
In Austria, Pfadfinder und Pfadfinderinnen Österreichs is a member of both WOSM and WAGGGS. The association is open to members without prejudice to birth, nationality, religion or belief. Both Promise and Law contain references to god.

There are chaplains on national level for Lutheran and for Roman Catholic groups and members, as well as a commissioner for spirituality on national level. There can be chaplains on council- and group-level. Some groups are attached to religious communities or parishes; but even these are open to members of all denominations or religions.

There are religious merit badges. Requirements for awards include religion and spirituality.

=== Belgium ===
In Belgium, the association "Les Scouts" offers a neutral Promise text, with no mention of God. FOS Open Scouting replaced "duty to God" with "loyal to a higher ideal" in their promise. The SGP association (Scouts et Guides Pluralistes) offer that same text as an alternative to "God" or "my religion".

=== Ireland ===
Scouting Ireland is a member of WOSM. The association is open to members without prejudice to birth, nationality, sexual orientation, religion or belief. The Law contains no reference to God and members are offered three alternative variants of the promise, one which refers to God, a second requiring that the member do their best to further their understanding and acceptance of a Spiritual Reality, and a third to uphold Scout Principles.

=== Italy ===
In Italy, there are two Catholic scout associations named AGESCI and FSE, with AGESCI being a WOSM and WAGGGS member.

=== Jordan ===
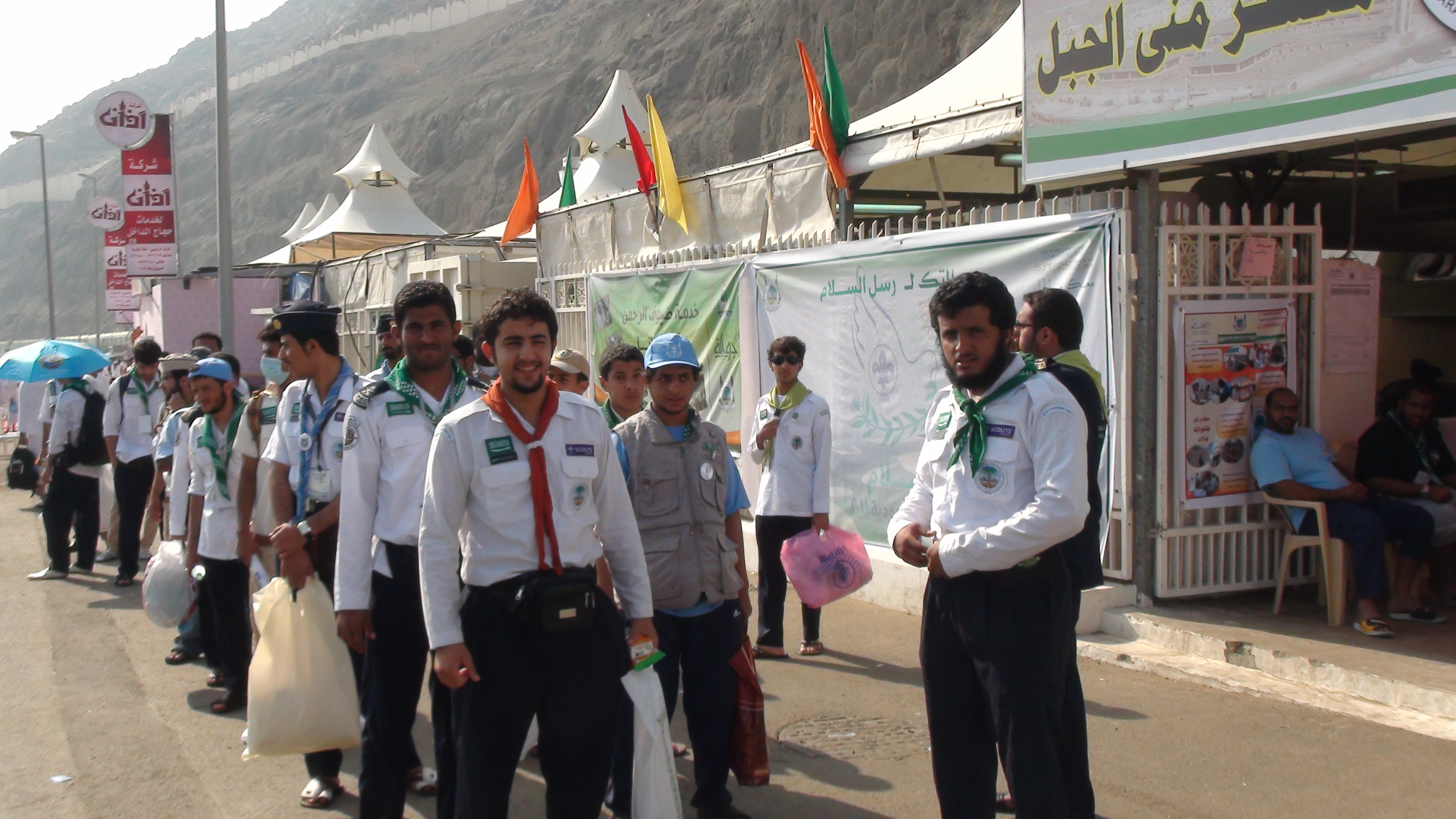
Boy Scout camp during the pilgrimage season in Mina, Saudi Arabia

Scout groups handle religious practices in different ways. In Jordan the units are affiliated with the International Union of Muslim Scouts.

=== Malaysia ===
In Malaysia, Girl Guides working on their Bintang Anugerah Ketua Pesuruhjaya (Head Commissioner Award) must complete a requirement about their faith.

=== Slovenia ===
In Slovenia, Zveza tabornikov Slovenije is a member of WOSM. The guiding principles include plurality, openness to members without prejudice to birth, nationality, religion or belief; provided the member abides by the principles of pacifism, personal freedom, high moral and ethical principles and principles of the international Scouting movement. In the promise the reference to God is replaced with "acceptance and development of Spiritual reality". No religious merit badges are in use.

A separate organization, Združenje slovenskih katoliških skavtinj in skavtov actively practices the Roman Catholic religion in its ranks. This organization is a member of WAGGGS.

=== Sweden ===
In 1970, the Swedish Scout Promise was changed by Svenska Scoutförbundet from "I promise to do my best in performing my duty to God and the motherland, helping others, and following the Scout Law" to "I promise to do my best in following the Scout Law". The part of the Scout Law that addresses religion is "A Scout seeks her/his faith and respects the faith of others".

=== United Kingdom ===
==== The Scout Association ====
All members of The Scout Association are encouraged to:

- make every effort to progress in the understanding and observance of the Promise to do their best to do their duty to God or to uphold Scouting's values as appropriate
- explore their faiths, beliefs and attitudes
- consider belonging to some faith or religious body
- carry into daily practice what they profess.

If a Scout Group, Explorer Scout Unit or Scout Network is composed of members of several denominations or religions, the young people should be encouraged to attend services relevant to their own faith.

In October 2012 an eleven-year-old atheist boy was denied entry to the Scouts in Somerset, England.

As of 1 January 2014, an alternative promise is available for those of no faith.

There are 2 activity badges relating to faith, one for exploring the members own faith (my faith) and another for learning about several other faiths (world faiths) however both of these badges are optional.

=== United States ===
The Boy Scouts of America (BSA) celebrates Scout Sunday and Scout Sabbath in February, while the Girl Scouts of the USA (GSUSA) celebrates similar holidays, known as Girl Scout Sabbath, Girl Scout Shabbat, and Girl Scout Sunday, in March. In general, religion in scouting was seen as ecumenical.

Up to 2019, The Church of Jesus Christ of Latter-day Saints (LDS Church) included Scouting as an official part of its religious program for boys and young men. The LDS Church was the first institutional sponsor of the BSA in the US, and used to sponsor more BSA units than any other organization.

The Boy Scouts of America requires all Scouts to believe in a God or comparable higher power, but currently admits Scouts who are non-theistic Buddhists, Jains, and Hindus from non-theistic sectarian groups. The religious awards of all three faiths are recognized by The Boy Scouts of America. The Girl Scouts of the USA does not have any requirement of faith or belief, and admits girls of any or no religious belief or doctrine, regardless of the presence or absence of belief in a God or comparable higher power.

Both organizations require their members to recite a pledge that includes a reference to God; the BSA pledge requires a commitment to do their "duty to God", while the GSUSA pledge asks girls "to serve God". However, while GSUSA allows the elimination or substitution of "God" with an alternate word that represents a Scout's beliefs, BSA does not.

==== Boy Scouts of America ====
In Cub Scouting, each rank must complete a requirement about their faith. Additionally, members of the BSA's Scouting programs are eligible to work on their faith's religious emblem.

===== Unitarian Universalist Association controversy =====
Currently, the Unitarian Universalist Association (UUA) has been the only religious emblems program, Religion in Life, to lose its BSA recognition. In 1992, the UUA stated its opposition to the BSA's policies on homosexuals, atheists, and agnostics; and in 1993, the UUA updated the Religion in Life program to include criticism of the BSA policies. In 1998, the BSA withdrew recognition of the Religion in Life program, stating that such information was incompatible with BSA programs. The UUA removed the material from their curriculum and the BSA renewed their recognition of the program. When the BSA found that the UUA was issuing supplemental material with the Religion in Life workbooks that included statements critical of discrimination on the basis of sexual orientation or personal religious viewpoint, the BSA's recognition was again withdrawn. On 24 March 2016, the Boy Scouts of America and the Unitarian Universalist Association signed an historic Memorandum of Understanding to provide guidance to UU congregations who wish to sponsor Boy Scout troops. This move towards re-establishing organizational ties is due to the BSA's recent policy changes making scouting more inclusive to gay scouts and gay scout leaders.

== International religious bodies in Scouting and Guiding ==
A number of religions and denominations have formed international organizations within Scouting and Guiding that should further the spiritual development of their adherents. Most of these organizations employ two types of membership: individual and organizational.

The religious organizations include:

- International Union of Muslim Scouts (IUMS)
- International Catholic Conference of Scouting (ICCS)
- International Catholic Conference of Guiding (ICCG)
- World Buddhist Scout Council (WBSC)
- International Forum of Jewish Scouts (IFJS)
- International Link of Orthodox Christian Scouts (DESMOS)
- Council of Protestants in Guiding and Scouting (CPGS)
- Won-Buddhist Scout Council
- Sikh Scouts

ICCS, DESMOS, IUMS, WBSB, IFJS, CPGS enjoy consultative status with the World Scout Committee, ICCG and CPGS with WAGGGS.

A number of non-religious associations, mainly from French speaking countries, formed in 1996 the International Union of the Pluralist-Secular Scout-Guide Associations.

The Friends Committee on Scouting is a religious body of the Religious Society of Friends and serves Boy Scouts of America, Girl Scouts of the USA, Scouts Canada, Girl Guides of Canada and Camp Fire.

== See also ==
- Scouts' Own
- Scout prayer
- Scouts' Day
- Scouting controversy and conflict
- World Buddhist Scout Council
