= Gagey =

Gagey is a surname. Notable people with the surname include:

- Frédéric Gagey (born 1956), French business executive and entrepreneur
- Jacques Gagey (born 1954), French Catholic priest
