= IUMS =

IUMS may refer to:

- Isfahan University of Medical Sciences, located in Isfahan, Iran
- Iran University of Medical Sciences, located in Tehran, Iran
- The International Union of Microbiological Societies, a Scientific Union member of the International Council for Science
- The International Union of Muslim Scouts headquartered in Saudi Arabia
- The International Union of Muslim Scholars (al-Ittihad al-Alami li-Ulama al-Muslimin, formerly translated as the International Association of Muslim Scholars, IAMS) presided by Yusuf al-Qaradawi and headquartered at the Islamic Cultural Centre of Ireland
