= Sarah Rita Kattan =

Lebanese architect

- Born: سارة ريتا قطان
- Citizenship: Lebanese
- Occupation: architect
- Known for: Vice-Chairperson of the World Scout Committee

Sarah Rita Kattan (Arabic: سارة ريتا قطان) is a Lebanese architect and scout leader, who served as vice-chairperson of the World Scout Committee, the governing body of the World Organization of the Scout Movement, from August 2021 to August 2024, the first Arab women to have such a role. She had served as a voting member from 2017. She is the executive director of a design and development foundation, "Design For Communities" (D4C), in Beirut.

Kattan began her scouting with the Lebanese Scouting Federation. In December 2025, she was awarded a Bronze Wolf Award for services to Scouting.
