= Fédération Libanaise des Eclaireuses et des Guides =

- Lebanese Federation of Girl Scouts and Girl Guides
- Headquarters: Damascus Road
- Location: Beirut
- Country: Lebanon
- Founded: 1961/1998
- Membership: 6,615
- Affiliation: World Association of Girl Guides and Girl Scouts

The Fédération Libanaise des Eclaireuses et des Guides (FLEG, Lebanese Federation of Girl Scouts and Girl Guides) (Arabic: الإتحاد اللبناني للمرشدات و الدليلات) is the national Guiding organization of Lebanon. Guiding was introduced to Lebanon in 1937 and became a member of the World Association of Girl Guides and Girl Scouts (WAGGGS) in 1954. The girls-only federation consists of five independent organizations with a total of 6,615 members(as of 2008).

== History ==
Guiding in Lebanon started in 1937, when the Catholic Association des Guides du Liban (AGDL) was founded. The association followed mainly the program of the Guides de France. The Guides de Liban were admitted to WAGGGS as an associate member in 1954.

In 1957, a second organization was founded: the interreligious Association des Eclaireuses du Liban (AEL) which also sought international recognition. So both organizations joined and formed the Organisation Nationale des Guides et des Eclaireuses du Liban (ONGEL, National Organization of Girl Guides and Girl Scouts of Lebanon) in 1961. The WAGGGS membership was transferred to this joint organization, which became a full member in 1963. ONGEL was among the founding members of the WAGGGS-Arab Region in 1966.

Guiding continued even during the Lebanese Civil War from 1975 to 1990, but most activities on national and international level had to be stopped and membership dropped. After the end of the war new groups were founded and membership increased again. The end of the war marked also the beginning of contacts between ONGEL and a number of unrecognized Lebanese Guide associations. Thus led to the formation of the Fédération Libanaise des Eclaireuses et des Guides in 1998 whose members were all unrecognized but wanted to adhere to WAGGGS.

During this process of adhesion both the AGDL and the AEL became members of the new federation. In 2005, five of the eight members of the federation were recognized by WAGGGS and the WAGGGS membership was finally transferred to the FLEG.

== Members ==
In 2026, members of the federation were

- the Association des Guides du Liban – Lebanese Girl Guides Association (AGDL, Catholic)
- the Association des Eclaireuses du Liban – Lebanese Girl Scouts Association (AEL, interreligious)
- the Association des Eclaireuses du Scout musulman au Liban (female section of the Muslim Scout Association of Lebanon)
- the Association des Guides nationales orthodoxes – National Orthodox Guide Association (GNO, Orthodox Christian)
- the Association des Eclaireuses Al-Jarrah (interreligious)
- the Association des Eclaireuses du Masharih
- the Association des Eclaireuses du Tanshia National
- the Association des Guides Al Mahdi (female section of the Imam al-Mahdi Scouts)
- the Association des Eclaireuses Resala
- the Association des Eclaireuses de l’Education nationale.

== Program and ideals ==
The Lebanese Guide organizations follow different program schemes that have to be recognized by the federation and by WAGGGS. All five members of the federation cooperate with the corresponding Boy Scout organizations who are all members of the Lebanese Scouting Federation.

=== Association des Guides du Liban ===
The association is divided in six branches, corresponding to age or needs:

- Farandoles (pre-Brownie section) – ages 6 and 7
- Jeannettes (Brownies) – ages 8 to 11
- Guides – ages 12 to 15
- Caravelles – ages 15 to 17
- Jeunes en Marche (Youth in movement) – ages 18 to 21
- Equipe Tournesol (Sunflower branch) – extension branch for Guides with special needs.

=== Association des Eclaireuses du Liban ===
The association is divided in three branches:

- Zahrat (Brownies) – ages 8 to 11
- Eclaireuses (Girl Scouts) – ages 12 to 14
- Caravelles – ages 15 to 17.

This association emphasizes on youth leadership; most leaders are between 17 and 22 years old.

== Emblems ==
The membership badge of the Fédération Libanaise des Eclaireuses et des Guides and many of the member Guide emblems incorporate the Cedar of Lebanon, the national symbol.

Association des Eclaireuses du Masharih

== See also ==
- Lebanese Scouting Federation
