= Scout prayers =

Traditional worship in Scouting

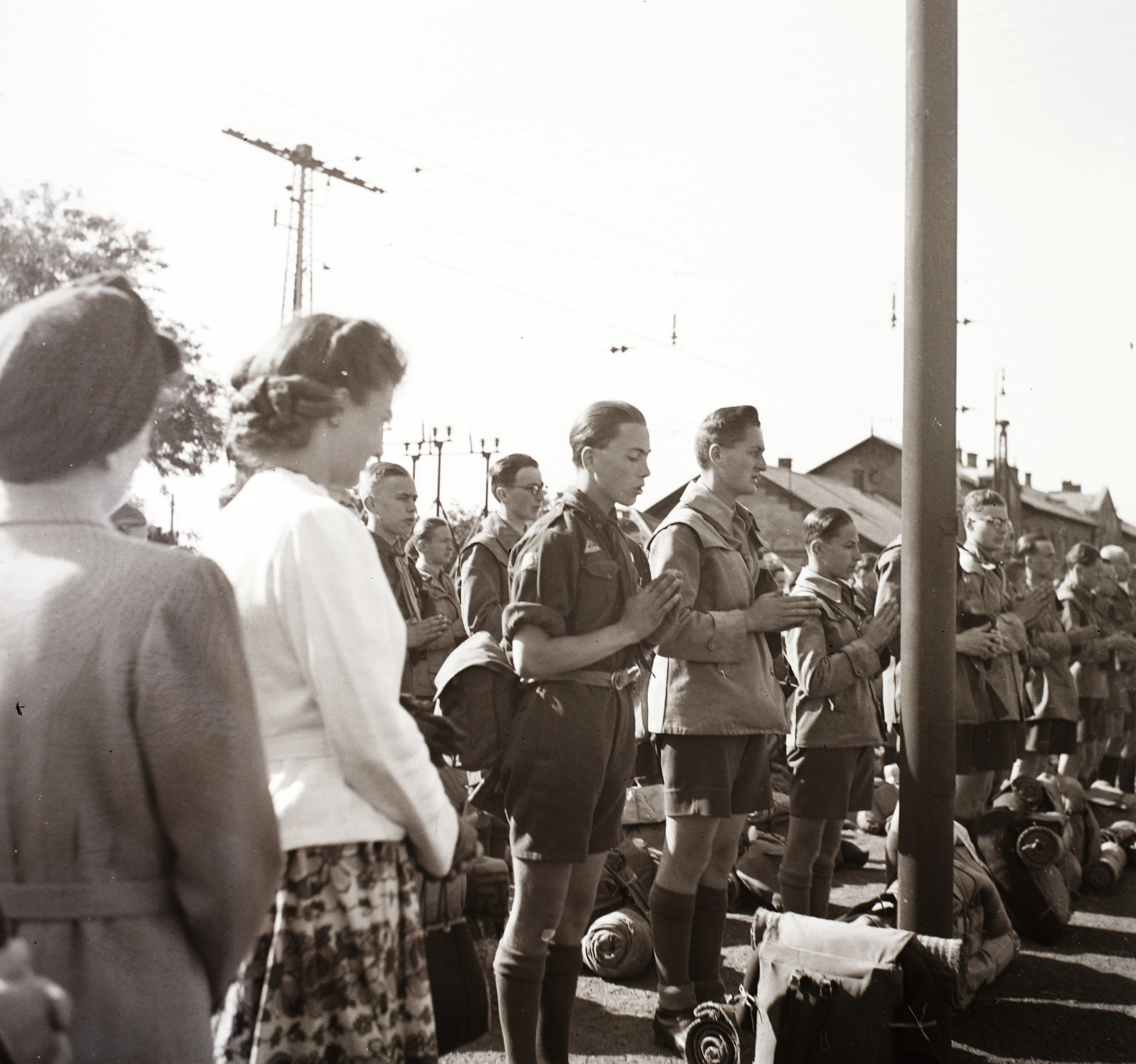
- Scouts pray at Kelenföld railway station

Prayer is used in Scouting worldwide, following the belief of its founder, Robert Baden-Powell, that "a scout is reverent." When creating the Scouting concept, Baden-Powell was adamant that there was a place for God within it. In Scouting for Boys, Baden-Powell wrote:

We aim for the practice of Christianity in their everyday life and dealings, and not merely the profession of theology on Sundays...

Baden-Powell believed that Scouting should be independent of any single faith or religion, but still held that spirituality and a belief in a higher power are key to the development of young people.

== Boy Scouts of America ==
The Boy Scouts of America use many Scout Prayers.

=== Scout Benediction ===
May the Great Scoutmaster of all Scouts be with us until we meet again.

=== The Scout Law Prayer ===
(This prayer is designed to demonstrate the Scout Law.)

Dear Lord, Bless all those everywhere who contribute to shape the hearts, minds and bodies of young people everywhere. Let us remember what they have taught us and apply it in our daily life.

When facing deceit and dishonesty, let us be Trustworthy.
If we see hypocrisy and faithlessness, let us be Loyal.
Where disregard of others and mere materialism prevail, let us be Helpful.
When we find people in despair, let us be Friendly.
In an atmosphere of ill manner, let us be Courteous.
Where some measure manliness in brutality and crudeness, let us be Kind.
Though lawbreaking and rule-scoffing are common, let us be Obedient.
While others grumble and grouch, let us be Cheerful.
In an environment blighted by waste and extravagance, let us be Thrifty.
When confronted with danger and temptation, let us be Brave.
As we see filth and pollution everywhere, let us be Clean.
While witnessing impiety, let us remember to be Reverent.

In short, in a world that has for generation after generation lamented the lack of good examples, let us, as Scouts, stand out, grow up, and become real adults.

Amen.

=== Cub Scouts ===
Several Cub Scout prayers are used in the United States.

=== Northern Tier Grace ===
For food, for raiment,
For life and opportunity,
For sun and rain,
For water and portage trails,
For friendship and fellowship,
We thank Thee, Oh Lord.
Amen

=== Philmont Grace ===
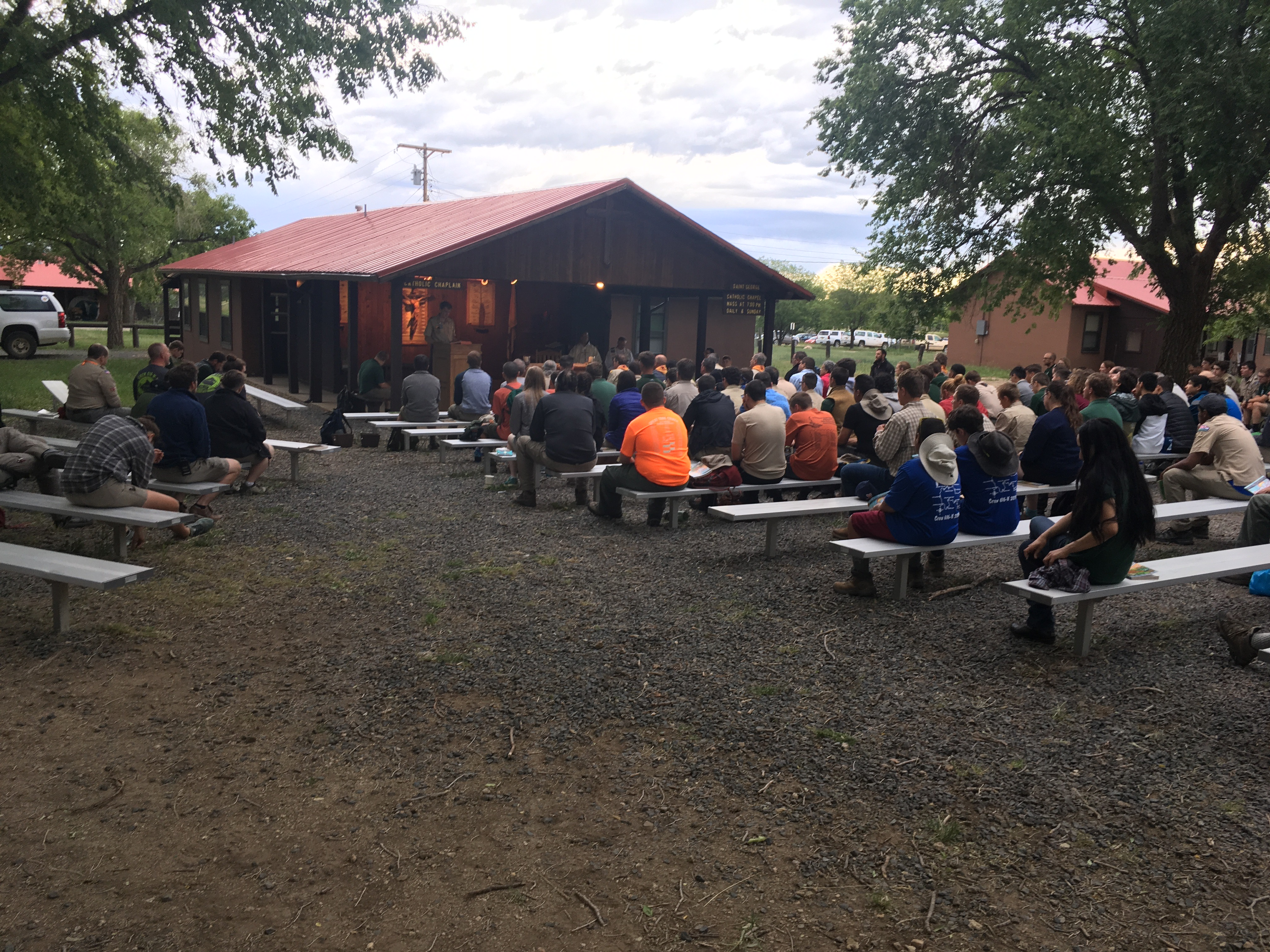
Philmont

For food,
for raiment,
for life,
for opportunity,
For friendship and fellowship,
We thank thee, O Lord.

=== Sea Base Grace ===
Bless the creatures of the sea.
Bless this person I call me.
Bless the Keys, You make so grand.
Bless the sun that warms the land.
Bless the fellowship we feel,
As we gather for this meal.
Amen

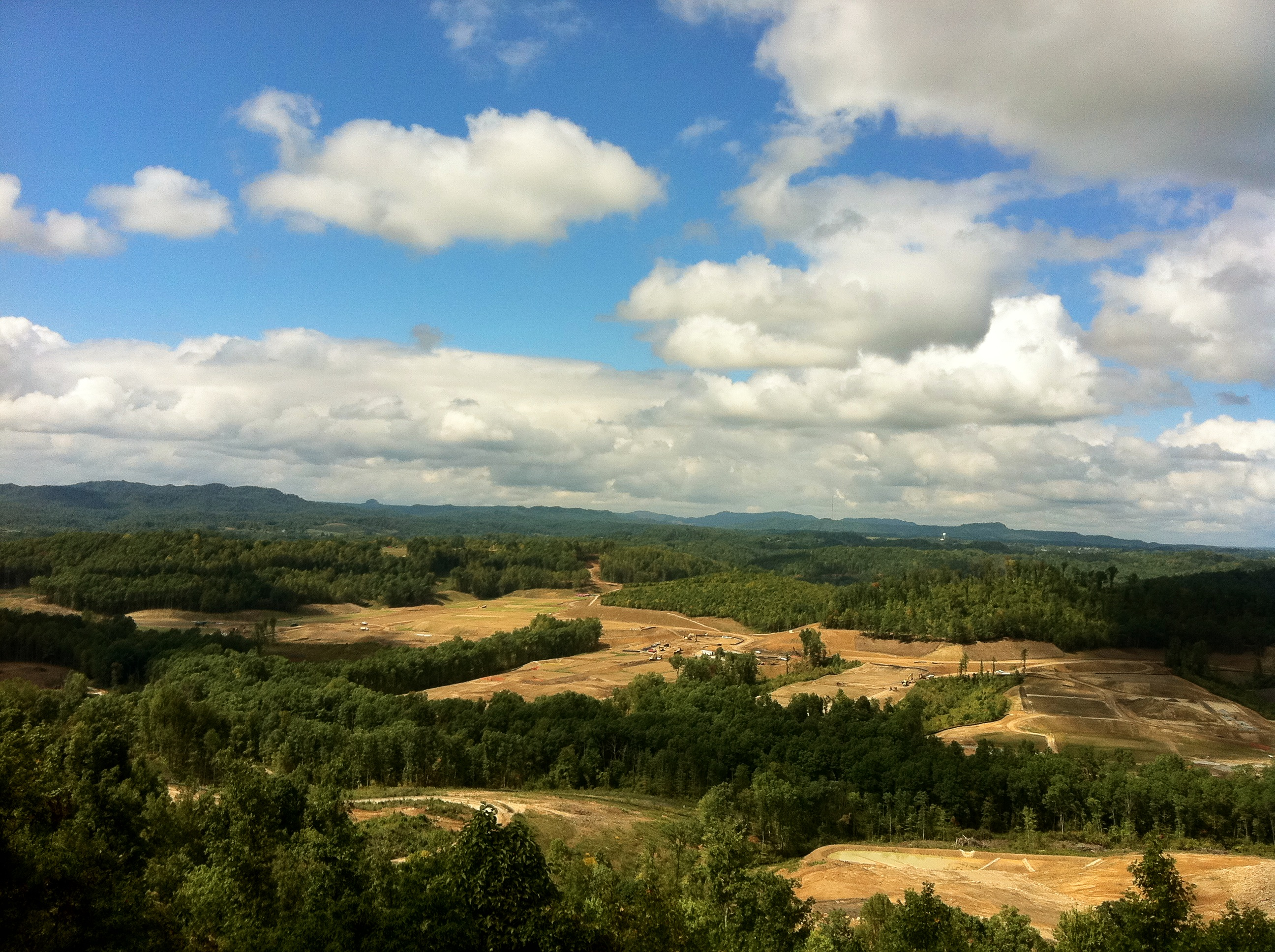
The Summit

=== Summit Grace ===
For this time and this place,
For your goodness and grace,
For each friend we embrace,
We thank thee, O Lord.

=== Order of the Arrow Grace ===
For night alone that rests our thought,
For quiet dawn that lights our trail,
For evening fire that warms and cheers,
For each repast that fuels our work,
We give thanks, O Lord.

== In the UK ==
=== The Cub Scout Prayer ===
Used by the Cub Scouts section.

Help us, oh lord, to serve you day by day
To do our duty and to enjoy our play
To keep the cub scout promise and to rest
Knowing we tried to do our best.
Amen.

Used by the Cub Scouts of the Scout Association:

Help us, dear God, to love thee day by day
To do our duty to you and enjoy our play
To keep our cub scout promise the best that we can
And to do our best always to help our fellow man.
Amen.

=== The Scout Prayer ===
Used by the Scout section.

Almighty and everlasting God,
By whose grace thy servants are enabled to fight
The good fight of faith and ever prove victorious;
We humbly beseech thee so to inspire us
That we may yield our hearts to thine obedience
And exercise our wills on thy behalf.
Help us to think wisely,
To speak rightly,
To resolve bravely,
To act kindly,
To live purely.
Bless us in body and soul
And make us a blessing to our comrades.
Whether at home or abroad
May we ever seek the extension of thy kingdom.
Let the assurance of thy presence
Save us from sinning,
Strengthen us in life and comfort us in death.
O Lord our God, accept this prayer
We pray to the lord,
Amen.

Dear Heavenly Father,

Help to keep my honor bright
And teach me that integrity of character
Is my most priceless possession.

Grant that I may do my best today,
And strive to do even better tomorrow.

Teach me that duty is a friend and not an enemy,
And help me face even the most disagreeable task cheerfully.

Give me the faith to understand my purpose and life,
Open my mind to the truth and fill my heart with love.

I am thankful for all the blessings you have bestowed upon my country.
Help me to do my duty to my country and
To know that a good nation must be made from good men.

Help me to remember my obligation to obey the Scout Law,
And give me understanding, so that it is more than mere words.

May I never tire of the joy of helping other people or
Look the other way when someone is in need.

You have given me the gift of a body,
Make me wise enough to keep it healthy,
That I might serve better.

You are the source of all wisdom,
Help me to have an alert mind,
Teach me to think,
And help me to learn discipline.

In all that I do and in every challenge I face,
Help me to know the difference between right and wrong,
And lead me in obedience on a straight path to a worthy goal.

Amen.

=== The Venturer Prayer ===
Used by the Venture Scout section.

Lord, We thank you for letting us come once again to marvel at your creations. We hope that those in the group who are new to this activity will leave with the same sense of wonder that we always feel as we step into a cave.
We treat these activities as fun, but always with a sense of wonder at the thousands of years required to create even the smallest of the features at which we look.
Help us to preserve your work, both for ourselves and for future generations of Scouts and Cavers.

Amen.

=== Gilwell Grace ===
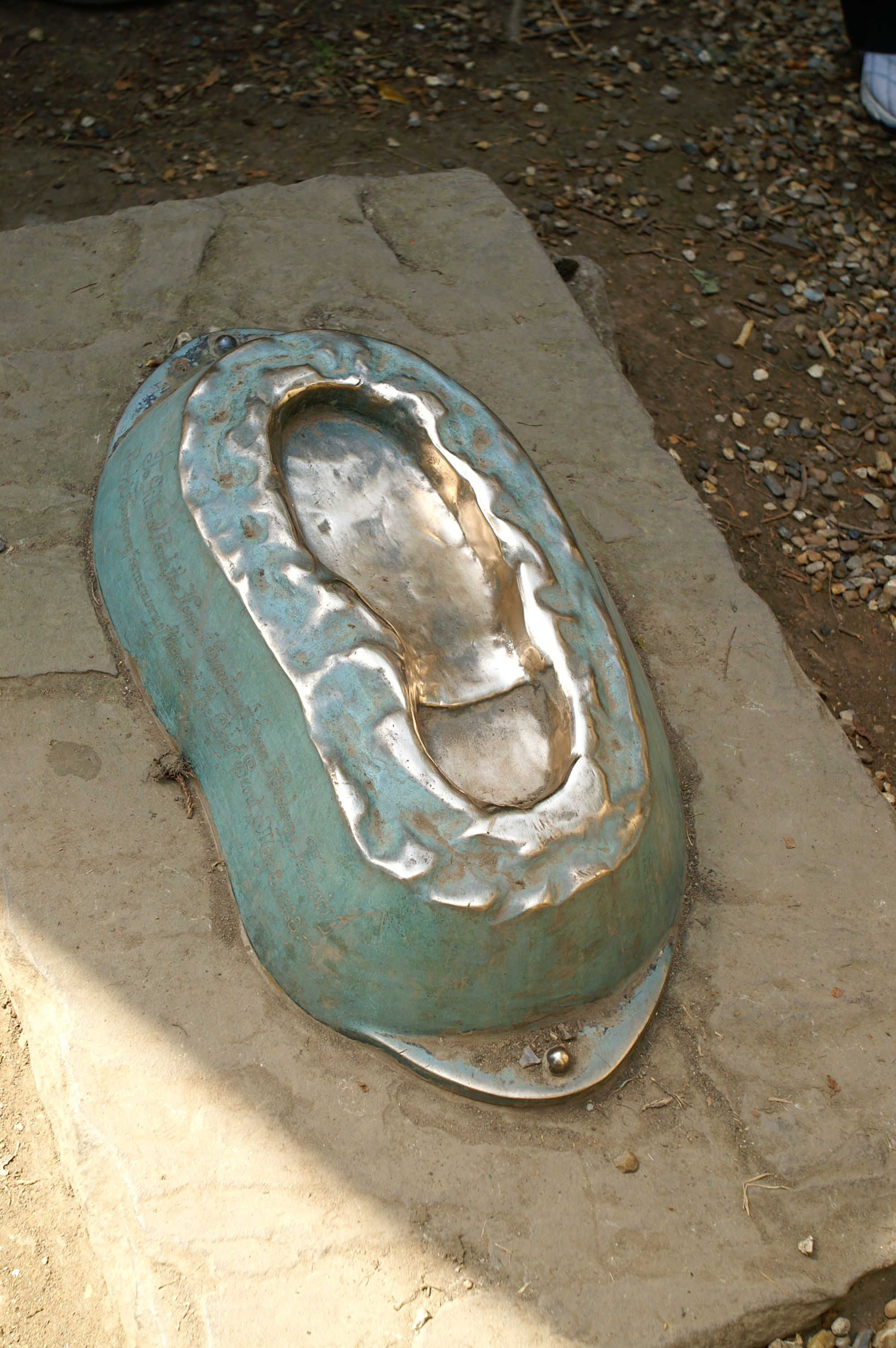
B-P's footprint

Originated at Gilwell Park.

Oh Lord,
the giver of all good.
We thank thee,
for our daily food.
May Scouting friends,
and Scouting ways.
Help us to serve thee all our days.
Amen.

=== The Rover Scout Prayer ===
The Rover Scout prayer is based upon the prayer of St Ignatius of Loyola and was adopted by Baden-Powell for use by the Rover Scout section.

By the Spirits of the Just,
Made perfect in their suffering;
Teach us in our turn, O Lord;
To serve thee as we ought:
To give, and not to count the cost,
To fight, and not to heed the wounds,
To toil and not to seek for rest
To labor and not to ask any reward,
Save that of knowing that we do thy will.

Amen.

== See also ==
- Scout Law
- Religion in Scouting
