= Jean Corbisier =

Professor Jean Corbisier
- Born: 23 September 1869; Brussel
- Died: 12 March 1928 (aged 58); Brussel
- Known for: One of the founders of Catholic Scouting

Jean Corbisier, a Belgian professor, was one of the founders of Catholic Scouting.

== Background ==
At the 1920 1st World Scout Jamboree in London Father Jacques Sevin SJ of France, professor Corbisier and Count Mario di Carpegna of Italy decided to create an international umbrella for Catholic Boy Scouts, the International Bureau of Catholic Scouting. Pope Benedict XV supported this idea and in 1922 at the 2nd International Scout Conference in Paris, Catholic Boy Scouts from Argentina, Austria, Belgium, Chile, Ecuador, France, Italy, Luxembourg, Poland, Spain and Hungary created this umbrella International Catholic Scouting Organization (OISC). World War II put an end to the OISC.

== Gallery ==
portraits of Jean Corbisier
