= Mario di Carpegna =

Count Mario di Carpegna
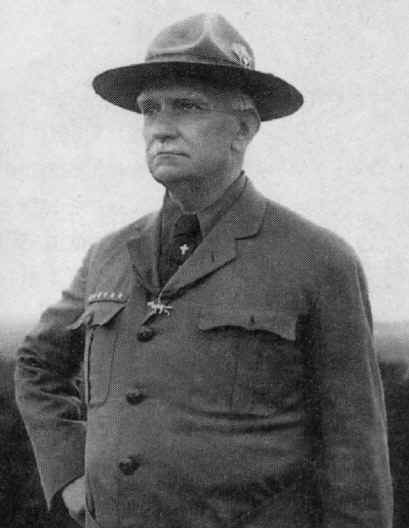
- in Scout uniform with the Silver Wolf Award
- Born: 19 August 1856; Rome
- Died: 3 November 1924 (aged 68)
- Military career
- Allegiance: Italy
- Awards: Chief Scout
- Other work: Politician

Count Mario Gabrielli di Carpegna (19 August 1856 in Rome – 3 November 1924 in Rome) was an Italian politician and soldier, and the founder of the Associazione Scouts Cattolici Italiani (ASCI) on 16 January 1916. di Carpegna served as Central Commissioner of ASCI at its foundation in 1916, and was the Chief Scout from 1922 until his death, as well as a founding member of the International Scout Committee.

== Background ==
In 1911, at the international gymnastics competition in Nancy, France, the creation of the Union internationale des œuvres catholiques d'éducation physique was established under the chairmanship of Count di Carpegna.

At the 1920 1st World Scout Jamboree in London Father Jacques Sevin SJ of France, professor Jean Corbisier of Belgium and Count di Carpegna decided to create an international umbrella for Catholic Boy Scouts, the International Bureau of Catholic Scouting. Pope Benedict XV supported this idea and in 1922 at the 2nd International Scout Conference in Paris, Catholic Boy Scouts from Argentina, Austria, Belgium, Chile, Ecuador, France, Italy, Luxembourg, Poland, Spain and Hungary created this umbrella International Catholic Scouting Organization (OISC). Its rules were approved by the Pope in July 1922 and di Carpegna was elected president. World War II put an end to the OISC. The International Catholic Conference of Scouting still has its headquarters in Rome, at the Associazione Guide e Scouts Cattolici Italiani (AGESCI), heir to ASCI.
