= Religious emblems programs (Girl Scouts of the USA) =

Programs administered by religious groups

A variety of religious emblems programs are used by the Girl Scouts of the USA (GSUSA) to encourage youth to learn about their faith and to recognize adults who provide significant service to youth in a religious environment. These religious programs are created, administered and awarded by the various religious groups and not GSUSA, though the GSUSA recognizes such programs and allows the emblem to be worn on the uniform. Many are listed by Programs of Religious Activities with Youth (P.R.A.Y.), an independent organization, as awards recognized by the Girl Scouts in an official brochure provided to Girl Scout council offices, as well as posted on the P.R.A.Y. website. The Girl Scouts also recognize that not all religions have programs that are affiliated through P.R.A.Y. and suggests contacting local religious leaders for information about those.

== P.R.A.Y. listed programs and awards ==
The following awards are administered through the P.R.A.Y. and may be worn on the uniform upon completion of the program. The emblems and awards given to girls at the completion of the program are worn either "in a single horizontal row on the right side of the uniform blouse, level with the Girl Scout Membership Pin [on the uniform sash], or on the vest in the area below the membership stars or troop/group numerals and above the next official insignia already on the vest."

Faith Proponent Association	Daisy and Brownie Girl Scouts	Junior Girl Scouts	Cadette Girl Scouts	Senior and Ambassador Girl Scouts	Adult Recognition
African Methodist Episcopal Church P.R.A.Y.	God and Me	God and Family	God and Church	God and Life	God and Service
Baháʼí (Note: There are multiple different awards of the same name, intended for different age levels of Girl Scouts of the faith.) Baháʼí Committee on Scouting	Unity of Mankind (Level 1)	Unity of Mankind (Level 2)	Unity of Mankind (Level 2) Unity of Mankind (Level 3)	Unity of Mankind (Level 3)	Service to Humanity
Baptist P.R.A.Y., Association of Baptists for Scouting	God and Me	God and Family	God and Church	God and Life	Good Shepherd
Buddhist National Buddhist Committee on Scouting	Padma (Chocolate)	Padma (Bronze)	Padma (Silver)	Padma (Silver) Padma (Certificate)	Bodhi
Christian Church (Disciples of Christ) P.R.A.Y.	God and Me	God and Family	God and Church	God and Life	God and Service
Christian Methodist Episcopal Church P.R.A.Y.	God and Me	God and Family	God and Church	God and Life	God and Service
Christian Science P.R.A.Y.	God and Country				God and Service
The Church of Jesus Christ of Latter-day Saints		Faith in God	Young Womanhood	Young Womanhood	
Churches of Christ Members of Churches of Christ for Scouting	Loving Servant	Joyful Servant	Good Servant		Faithful Servant
Community of Christ World Community Program	God and Me Light of the World	Light of the World Path of the Disciple	Path of the Disciple	Exploring Community Together	World Community International Youth Service Award
Eastern Orthodox Eastern Orthodox Committee on Scouting	Saint George	Chi Rho	Alpha Omega		Prophet Elias
Episcopal National Episcopal Scouters Association	God and Me	God and Family	God and Church	God and Life	Saint George Episcopal
Hindu North American Hindu Association	Dharma		Dharma Karma	Karma	Dharma Saathi Karma Saathi Dharma Bhakta Karma Bhakta
Islamic National Islamic Committee on Scouting	Bismillah	In the Name of Allah Award	Quratula’in Award	Muslimeen Award	
Jewish National Jewish Girl Scout Committee	Liorit Lehavah	Bat Or	Menorah	Or Emunah	Ora
Lutheran National Lutheran Association on Scouting	God and Me	God and Family	God and Church	God and Life	Lamb
Polish National Catholic Church	Love of God (Milosc Boga)		God and Country (Bog I Ojczyzna)		Bishop Thaddeus F. Zielinski
Presbyterian Church in America (PCA) P.R.A.Y.	God and Me	God and Family	God and Church	God and Life	God and Service
Presbyterian Church (U.S.A.) National Association of Presbyterian Scouters	God and Me	God and Family	God and Church	God and Life	God and Service
Protestant and Independent Christian Churches (Note: This includes: Assemblies of God, Church of the Brethren, Christian and Missionary Alliance, Church of God, Cumberland Presbyterian Church, Mennonite, Church of the Nazarene, Pentecostal, Reformed, Seventh-day Adventist, United Church of Christ and Wesleyan churches.) P.R.A.Y.	God and Me	God and Family	God and Church	God and Life	God and Service
Religious Society of Friends (Quakers) Friends Committee on Scouting	That of God		Spirit of Truth		Friends Emblem
Roman Catholic Church National Catholic Committee for Girl Scouts and Camp Fire	Family of God	I Live My Faith	Mary, the First Disciple	The Spirit Alive	The Saint Elizabeth Ann Seton Medal or the Saint Anne Medal
Unitarian Universalist Unitarian Universalist Association of Congregations	Love and Help	Love and Help Religion in Life	Religion in Life		
United Church of Christ P.R.A.Y.	God and Me	God and Family	God and Church	God and Life	God and Service
United Methodist National Association of United Methodist Scouters	God and Me	God and Family	God and Church	God and Life	God and Service
United Pentecostal Church International	God and Me	God and Family	God and Church	God and Life	God and Service
Unity Church Association of Unity Churches	God in Me		Light of God	Fillmore Youth Award	Distinguished Youth Service

== Patch programs ==
In addition to the official recognitions offered by each faith for girls, several faiths offer patch programs for girls who complete certain requirements and/or achieve certain goals. Because these patch programs are considered unofficial by GSUSA, they do not require formal approval from the Scouting organization, nor are they worn on the front of the uniform. Like other unofficial patches, event patches, and holiday patches, they are worn on the back of the uniform sash or vest.

Faith Proponent Association	Patch Program	Age Levels	Description
Islamic National Islamic Committee on Scouting	Ramadhan	Brownie, Junior, Cadette, Senior, Ambassador	Presented to girls who complete the requirements of the patch program for their age level and learn more about Ramadhan.
Islamic National Islamic Committee on Scouting	Ramadhan Goal Achiever	Daisy, Brownie, Junior, Cadette, Senior, Ambassador	Presented to girls who set one or more of the suggested goals during the week of Ramadhan.
Islamic National Islamic Committee on Scouting	Jumaa	Daisy, Brownie, Junior, Cadette, Senior, Ambassador	
Islamic National Islamic Committee on Scouting	Hajj	Daisy, Brownie, Junior, Cadette, Senior, Ambassador	Presented to girls who participate in the hajj, a pilgrimage to Mecca.
Islamic National Islamic Committee on Scouting	Share Ramadhan With a Friend	Daisy, Brownie, Junior, Cadette, Senior, Ambassador	Presented to girls who share the concepts and traditions of Ramadhan with a friend.
Jewish National Jewish Girl Scout Committee	Shabbat	Daisy, Brownie, Junior, Cadette, Senior, Ambassador	Presented to girls who participate in a Girl Scout Shabbat Service or wear their uniform to services during Girl Scout week.
Unitarian Universalist Unitarian Universalist Association of Congregations	Chalise	Daisy, Brownie, Junior, Cadette, Senior, Ambassador	Presented to girls who accomplish a goal or complete an activity related to the faith, such as completing a religious award program or attending a religious service.

P.R.A.Y. also offers its own "To Serve God" segment patch program for Girl Scouts of all ages and adult advisers of all faiths, designed to promote their religious awards programs. The name is inspired by the words "to serve God" in the Girl Scout promise. To earn the patch, girls and adults must attend or make an interfaith presentation about religious awards, then fulfill a personal commitment of their choice "to serve God", such as promoting, earning, or helping another girl earn the religious award for her faith. There are four segments for the patch. One is offered yearly, called the "anchor patch", while the other three are offered yearly on a rotational basis. After one patch is released, the previous year's patch is discontinued for the next three years, then is reinstated again for a one-year period. The program began in 2006, and as of August 2008, only two of these three patches have been released.

== See also ==
- Religious emblems programs (Boy Scouts of America)
