= Rashid Shoucair =

Former President of the Lebanese Scouting Federation

President of the Lebanese Scouting Federation

Rashid Shoucair (Arabic: رشيد شقير) served as President of the Lebanese Scouting Federation.

In 1981, he was awarded the 151st Bronze Wolf, the only distinction of the World Organization of the Scout Movement, awarded by the World Scout Committee for exceptional services to world Scouting.
