= Religious emblems programs =

Awards of religious recognition

Religious emblems programs also called religious recognition programs are awards set up by some religious organizations for members of various youth organizations.

== United States ==
In the United States, there are more than thirty different religious emblems, each representing a different faith. A diverse selection of religious groups participate in the program, including denominations of Christianity and other Abrahamic religions, the Dharmic religions and Zoroastrianism. The religious emblems are "created by the various religious groups to encourage youth to grow stronger in their faith. The religious groups, not the youth organizations, have created the emblem programs themselves. Each religious organization develops and administers its own program." Many religious groups have separate programs for different age levels within scouting, and some offer different programs or emblems for boys and girls. Some offer different programs or emblems for each youth organization.

The youth organizations do not run the programs, and youth organization leaders do not guide the youths through the program unless they also are the youth's religious leader or mentor. The youth organizations can choose to decide whether the emblems of a particular religious program will be worn on the youth organization's uniforms.

Once a youth has completed the program of their religion, they are usually presented with the emblem at a ceremony organized by their religious institution or the youth organization. The emblem is generally in the form of a medal, pin, or patch. Depending on the youth organization, the emblem can be worn only on formal or religious occasions, or may be worn all the time.

Many of the religions also have awards for adult members; however, adult members are generally nominated by others for service to the religion within Scouting. A few religious organizations offer awards for adults who serve as leaders or mentors for youth earning the awards. In most cases, adults do not have a formal program to complete to earn an award.

In the United States many, although not all, religious organizations with programs contract with the Programs of Religious Activities with Youth (P.R.A.Y.) business office to handle the mechanics of order processing. P.R.A.Y. itself develops and administers the God and Country program aimed at Protestant youth. P.R.A.Y. also promotes the religious emblems programs in general for all religions approved for scouting, both through lists and brochures distributed on the website and to scouting organizations, and through rotational segment patch programs designed to promote religious awards.

=== Boy Scouts of America ===
A variety of religious emblems programs approved by the Boy Scouts of America (BSA) are designed to encourage youth to learn about their faith and to recognize adults who provide significant service to youth in a religious environment. Under the promise of BSA, scout aim to be reverent.

Upon completion of approved programs (workshops, with books fill in along with their denomination faith) Boy Scouts will earn a purple knot that they may wear as the universal religious emblem knot insignia on the Scout uniform at all times. Participation in a program is not required, but encouraged although doing so is one method of completing some requirements for some Scout ranks. For instance Bronze award in Venturing Scouts and the TRUST MEDAL in Venturing as well.

To promote religious awards within BSA, P.R.A.Y. offers a "Duty to God" rotational segment patch program for scouts and adults who attend or make a presentation about religious awards, then make a personal commitment to fulfill their "duty to God". This program is similar to the "To Serve God" GSUSA and "Love God" AHG programs.

=== Girl Scouts of the USA ===
In the Girl Scouts of the USA (GSUSA) participation in a religious emblem program is optional and only a small percentage of Girl Scouts earn them. P.R.A.Y. has a list of religious emblems approved for Girl Scouts, but it is not considered exhaustive.

=== Camp Fire ===
In Camp Fire participation in a religious emblem program is optional. P.R.A.Y. has a list of religious emblems approved for Camp Fire members, but it is not considered exhaustive.

=== American Heritage Girls ===
As a Christian organization, the American Heritage Girls (AHG) approves of the Protestant God and Country program from P.R.A.Y., Members of Churches of Christ for Scouting (MCCS), as well as the Catholic programs available from the National Federation for Catholic Youth Ministry (N.F.C.Y.M.) and the Eastern Orthodox Program from P.R.A.Y approved by the Eastern Orthodox Committee on Scouting. Recognitions from other organizations, denominations, or religions are not approved for use with the organization.

To promote religious awards within AHG, P.R.A.Y. offers a "Love God" rotational segment patch program for girl scouts and adults who memorize the Biblical verses Mark 12:29-31, attend or make a presentation about religious awards, then make a personal commitment to "love God". This program is similar to the "Duty to God" BSA and "To Serve God" GSUSA programs.

== Canada ==
Scouts Canada and Girl Guides of Canada offer the Religion in Life badge. Different faiths develop their own programs which are approved by Scouts Canada (which also administers the program for Girl Guides of Canada).

Each program has multiple age stages and a badge can be earned for each stage with the border color indicating the stage. The emblem on the badge indicates which faith.

- Stage 1 - Ages 7–9 - yellow border
- Stage 2 - Ages 10–12 - green border
- Stage 3 - Ages 13–15 - blue border
- Stage 4 - Ages 15 and up - red border
- Stage 5 - adult - purple border

Currently recognized programs are

- Anglican Church of Canada
- Apostolic Church of the Pentecost
- Canadian Baptist Ministries
- Canadian Conference of the Mennonite Brethren Churches
- Canadian Armed Forces (Protestant)
- Christian Church (Disciples of Christ)
- Christian Science
- Church of the Nazarene
- Congregational Christian Church of Canada
- Eastern Orthodox Church
- Evangelical Church of Canada
- Free Methodist Church of Canada
- Lutheran Churches of Canada
- Moravian Church of Canada
- Orthodox Church
- Pentecostal Assemblies
- Polish National Catholic Church of Canada
- Presbyterian Church in Canada
- Religious Society of Friends (Quakers)
- Reorganized Church of Jesus Christ of Latter Day Saints
- Roman Catholic Church in Canada
- Salvation Army
- The Standard Church
- United Church of Canada

The above all have the same badge of a circle around a Greek alpha and omega. The following all have different badges.

- Bahá’í Faith - nine pointed star
- Buddhist Faith - wheel of the law
- Canadian Unitarian Council - flaming chalice
- Hindu - om
- Islam in Canada - Allah in Arabic above a crescent moon and star above Allah in English
- Jewish Religion - Menorah
- Sikh - Khanda
- Zoroastrianism - Fravashi

== See also ==
- Religion in Scouting

== Footnotes ==
1. "Religious Emblems Programs FAQ". Boy Scouts of America. 2003. Archived from the original on May 1, 2006.
2. "Bear Rank God Requirements". U.S. Scouting Service Project. 2003.
3. Michael F. Bowman and James Bryant (2003). "Webelos Rank Requirements". U.S. Scouting Service Project. Archived from the original on February 6, 2006.
4. Peterson, Robert W. (1984). The Boy Scouts: An American Adventure. American Heritage Publishing. ISBN 0-8281-1173-1.
5. "What if my Religious Org. Doesn't Have a Religious Emblem Program?". U.S. Scouting Service Project. 1998.
6. "rec.scouting.issues Commonly asked questions (FAQ 2)". Faqs.com.
7. "UUA/BSA Compromise Crumbles". PlanetOut.com. Archived from the original on August 30, 2005.
8. "Unitarian Universalist Association/Boy Scouts of America Correspondence & Documentation". Unitarian Universalist Association. Archived from the original on March 1, 2006.
9. Buehrens, John (June 11, 1998). "Letter to the Religious Relationship Committee". Archived from the original on September 20, 2003. "Surely the Religious Relationships Committee of the Boy Scouts of America cannot intend to tell a religious group what we may teach with regard to our own religious principles."
10. "P.R.A.Y. Boy Scout Bulletin first quarter 2005". P.R.A.Y.– Programs of Religious Activities with Youth.
11. "Statement from the Unitarian Universalist Association". Unitarian Universalist Association. Archived from the original on March 8, 2006.
12. "Religious Emblems Programs available to Members of the Boy Scouts of America". Boy Scouts of America– National Council. Archived from the original on July 17, 2007.
13. "Religious Emblem approved for Unitarian Universalist youth". Scouter Forum. Archived from the original on September 22, 2006.

== Further Information ==
- Programs of Religious Activities with Youth. Also known as P.R.A.Y.. The administrator of a set of Protestant religious programs but their business office is also a clearing house on info about the Religious Emblems Programs in the United States in general.
- Boy Scouts of America info on the Religious Emblems Programs
- Policy of the Boy Scouts of America Pertaining to Recognitions Granted by Churches, Synagogues, Temples, Mosques and Other Religious Organizations
- Friends Committee on Scouting
- National Catholic Committee for Girl Scouts and Camp Fire and National Catholic Committee on Scouting (Boy Scouts)
- National Lutheran Association on Scouting
- Eastern Orthodox Committee on Scouting
- National Jewish Committee on Scouting (Boy Scouts) National Jewish Girl Scout Committee
- Baha'i Religious Emblem Program
- National Buddhist Committee on Scouting
- North American Hindu Association
- National Islamic Committee on Girl Scouting
