= Fédération Nationale des Eclaireurs et Eclaireuses du Luxembourg =

- National Scout and Guide; Federation of Luxembourg
- Country: Luxembourg
- Founded: 1914
- Membership: approximately 2,400
- Affiliation: Scouting in Luxembourg
- Website http://www.fnel.lu

The Fédération Nationale des Eclaireurs et Eclaireuses du Luxembourg (National Scout and Guide Federation of Luxembourg, FNEL) is one of Luxembourg's Scouting and Guiding organizations. It is a member of the federation Scouting in Luxembourg.

This secular association is open to all boys and girls of all religions, race and nationalities. It has about 2,000 members.

== History ==
Secular scouting in Luxembourg started in 1914. In 1916, twelve local Scout groups founded the Fédération Nationale des Eclaireurs du Luxembourg. The federation was among the founding members of the World Organization of the Scout Movement (WOSM) in 1922. In 1940, under the German occupation, Scouting was banned in Luxembourg. The Scout groups went underground and some members were arrested and sent to concentration camps.

In 1945, the FNEL and the Lëtzebuerger Scouten founded the Luxembourg Boy Scouts Association onto which the WOSM membership was transferred. The former boys-only FNEL opened to girls in 1966 and added the words et Eclaireuses (and Girl Guides) to its name in 1971.

in 2014, the Association des Girl Guides Luxembourgeoises moved its remaining members into the FNEL and terminated its activities.

== Program ==
The FNEL is one of the very few Scouting and Guiding organizations that is still today heavily influenced by the ideas of Ernest Thompson Seton and his Woodcraft movement.

The organization has five age divisions:

- Beavers – ages 5 to 7
- Wëllefcher (Cub Scouts) – ages 8 to 11
- Scouten and Guiden (Scouts and Guides) – ages 12 to 14
- Explorers – ages 15 to 18
- Routiers (Rover Scouts) – ages 18 to 26

== Motto, Scout Oath and Law ==
FNEL's motto is "Trei zum Land" (Loyal to the country).

=== Scout Oath ===
FNEL's Scout Oath is:

Ech versprieche, mäi Bescht ze dinn, fir meng Flichte géintiwwer der Gesellschaft a mir selwer z’erfëllen, fir no de Wäerter vum Scoutsgesetz ze liewen a fir mech mat Iech zesummen anzesetzen fir eng besser Welt.

I promise to do my best, to fulfill my duties towards society and myself, to live by the values of the Scout Law and to work with you for a better world.

=== Scout Law ===
FNEL's Scout Laws are:

- E Scout (Eng Guide) huet Disziplin.
  A Scout (a Guide) shows discipline.
- E Scout (Eng Guide) as offen a héiferlech.
  A Scout (a Guide) is open and helpful.
- All Scouten a Guide sin Bridder a Schwesteren.
  All Scouts and Guides are brothers and sisters.
- E Scout (Eng Guide) mécht säi (hiirt) Bescht fir all denen déi a Nout sin ze hëllefen.
  A Scout (a Guide) does his (her) best helping all people in troubles.
- E Scout (Eng Guide) mécht all Dag a gudd Wierk.
  A Scout (a Guide) does a Good Turn each day.
- E Scout (Eng Guide) as gudd mat den Déiren, a respektéiert d'Natur.
  A Scout (a Guide) is good to the animals and respects nature.
- E Scout (Eng Guide) hëlt alles vun der gudder Säit.
  A Scout (a Guide) always looks at the bright side.
- E Scout (Eng Guide) respektéiert wat anere gehéiert.
  A Scout (a Guide) respects property.
- E Scout (Eng Guide) as propper u Läif a Séil; hie (si) seet a mécht näischt Schlechtes.
  A Scout (a Guide) is clean in body and soul; he (she) doesn't say and do bad things.
