= Muhammad el-Hibri =

- Born: 1910
- Died: 1999 (aged 88–89)
- Known for: Member of the Arab Scout Committee

Mohamed el-Hibri (1910–1999) (Arabic: محمد الهبري) of the Lebanese Scouting Federation served as a member of the Arab Scout Committee.

He was the son of Arab Scouting pioneer Toufik el-Hibri. In 1956 he was the first president of the League of Arab Scouts, the forerunner to the Arab Scout Committee.

In 1973, he was awarded the 80th Bronze Wolf, the only distinction of the World Organization of the Scout Movement, awarded by the World Scout Committee for exceptional services to world Scouting.
