= Wiltz International Scout Centre =

Coordinates: 49°57′59″N 5°56′17″E

The Wiltz International Scout Centre is situated in Wiltz, in northwestern Luxembourg. During the camping season, it hosts 80,000 Scouts a year from all over the world. The Scout Centre is not a single building but nine chalets and seven campsites surrounding the town.

The Scout Centre is run by the local group of the Lëtzebuerger Guiden a Scouten.

== See also ==
- Gilwell Park
- Larch Hill
- Kandersteg International Scout Centre
- Our Chalet
