= Georges El-Ghorayeb =

Georges El Ghorayeb
- Born: 1 January 1958 (age 67)

Georges El Ghorayeb (Arabic: جرجيس الغريب, born 1 January 1958) of Beirut, Lebanon was one of 12 elected volunteer members of the World Scout Committee, the main executive body of the World Organization of the Scout Movement, from 2005 to 2011, and served as liaison to external Scout bodies International Link of Orthodox Christian Scouts (DESMOS) and the International Scout and Guide Fellowship (ISGF).

In 2012, Georges was awarded the 335th Bronze Wolf, the only distinction of the World Organization of the Scout Movement, awarded by the World Scout Committee for exceptional services to world Scouting.

In December 2017, he is elected as Chairman of the International Catholic Conference of Scouting.

Georges is an owner of an accounting firm, and was educated at the École supérieure et internationale de Gestion from 1979 to 1983.
