= Toufik el-Hibri =

Toufik El Hibri

Sheikh Toufik El Hibri (1869–1954) (Arabic: توفيق الهبري) was one of the primary founders of the Scout movement in Lebanon, as well as one of the earliest promoters of the Scouting movement in the Arab world, while much of the region was still within the Ottoman Empire. He was born in "Harat Eljourah" (حارة الجورة) neighborhood of central Beirut. He died in Beirut on 7 October 1954.

== Life ==
His family was brought up in a religious family and received his education in the presence of well known sheiks in the "Omari Mosque" and Emir Monzer Mosque.

He had the opportunity to learn his religion and life wisdom from different scientist from around the world like Morocco, Damascus, India and many famous visitors to Beirut who had acquaintance with his father.

== Social activities ==
He had many social activities some of which are: President of the Islamic Teaching and Education Committee school which started in 1899.

== Scouting activities ==
In 1905, he sponsored two young Indian men who came to Beirut to continue their post secondary education. He supported them to establish a new youth movement that was initiated by Baden-Powell which he called the "Ottoman Scout." After the end of World War I, he recreated the Scout movement under the name "The Moslem Scout" (الكشاف المسلم ). He sent delegates to Libya to help establishing a Scout movement there.

In 1973, his son Muhammad el-Hibri was awarded the Bronze Wolf, the only distinction of the World Organization of the Scout Movement, awarded by the World Scout Committee for exceptional services to world Scouting.

== Personal life ==
He was the father of Khalil al-Hibri, Lebanese politician and businessman. His grandchildren include Azizah Y. al-Hibri.

== See also ==
- Lebanese Scouting Federation
- Türkiye İzcilik Federasyonu
