= Association des Girl Guides Luxembourgeoises =

- Association of Luxembourgish Girl Guides
- Headquarters: 61a, rue de Trèves
- Location: Luxembourg
- Country: Luxembourg
- Founded: 1916
- Defunct: 2014
- Membership: 220 (2008)
- Affiliation: Bureau de Liaison des Associations Guides du Luxembourg
- Website www.aggl.lu

The Association des Girl Guides Luxembourgeoises (AGGL, Association of Luxembourgish Girl Guides) was a Guiding association in Luxembourg. The association was founded in 1916 under the name Les Guides de Luxembourg and closed down in 2014. The interreligious and coeducational association served about 220 members in 2008.

The AGGL was among the founder members of the World Association of Girl Guides and Girl Scouts (WAGGGS) in 1928. In 1960, the membership was transferred to the Bureau de Liaison des Associations Guides du Luxembourg, formed by the AGGL and the Lëtzebuerger Guiden (since 1994 Lëtzebuerger Guiden a Scouten).

After some years of declining membership, AGGL moved its remaining members into the Federation Nationale des Eclaireurs et Eclaireuses du Luxembourg in 2014 and terminated its activities.

== Program ==
The association was divided in three sections according to age:

- Wichtel/Wëllef (Brownies/Cub Scout) - ages 7 to 11
- Guides/Scouts - ages 11 to 16
- Explorers/Rangers - ages 16 to 23
