= Azizah Y. al-Hibri =

American philosopher and legal scholar (born 1943)

- عزيزة يحيى الهبري
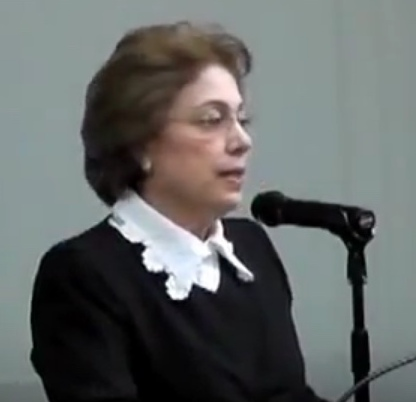
- al-Hibri in 2012
- Born: 1943 (age 82–83)
- Education: American University of Beirut (BA); University of Pennsylvania (PhD); University of Pennsylvania Law School (JD)
- Occupations: Philosopher; legal scholar

Azizah Y. al-Hibri (Arabic: عزيزة يحيى الهبري; born 1943) is an American philosopher and legal scholar who specializes in Islam and law.

== Career ==
Al-Hibri is professor emerita at the T. C. Williams School of Law, University of Richmond. She is a former professor of philosophy, founding editor of Hypatia: A Journal of Feminist Philosophy, and founder and president of KARAMAH: Muslim Women Lawyers for Human Rights. A Fulbright scholar, she has written extensively about Islam and democracy, Muslim women's rights, and human rights in Islam. She was an adviser to the PBS documentary Muhammad: Legacy of a Prophet (2002), produced by Unity Productions Foundation.

Al-Hibri is a member of the advisory board of various organizations, including the Pew Forum on Religion in Public Life, the Pluralism Project Harvard University, and Religion & Ethics Newsweekly (PBS). She is also a member of the Constitution Project's Liberty and Security Committee. In June 2011, al-Hibri was appointed by President Barack Obama to serve as a commissioner on the U.S. Commission on International Religious Freedom.

She also wrote the third chapter of Transforming the Faiths of our Fathers: Women who Changed American Religion (2004), edited by Ann Braude.

Al-Hibri is the grandchild of Sheik Toufik El Hibri who established the first Scout movement in the Arab world.

== Sources ==
- "Shattering the Stereotypes: Muslim Women Speak Out" (2005)
