= Scouting in Luxembourg (organization) =

Scouting Federation in Luxembourg

- Country: Luxembourg
- Founded: 2013
- Membership: 5,275
- Affiliation: World Organization of the Scout Movement
- Website sil.lu

Scouting in Luxembourg (SiL; formerly Luxembourg Boy Scout Association, LBSA) is a federation of two Scout associations serving Luxembourg. In Luxembourg, Scouting was founded in 1914 and became a member of the World Organization of the Scout Movement in 1922. SiL has a membership of 5,275 Scouts as of 2011.

Members of SiL are:

- Fédération Nationale des Eclaireurs et Eclaireuses du Luxembourg (FNEL, interreligious, coed)
- Lëtzebuerger Guiden a Scouten (LGS, Catholic, coed)

== See also ==
- Bureau de Liaison des Associations Guides du Luxembourg
- Wiltz International Scout Centre
