= Bureau de Liaison des Associations Guides du Luxembourg =

- Country: Luxembourg
- Founded: 1958
- Membership: 2,093
- Website gsgl.lu

The Bureau de Liaison des Associations Guides du Luxembourg was the national Guiding federation of Luxembourg. Guiding in Luxembourg started in 1915 and was among the founder members of the World Association of Girl Guides and Girl Scouts (WAGGGS) in 1928. The federation consisted of two associations and had a membership of 2,093 Guides in 2008. The membership in WAGGGS was transferred to the Lëtzebuerger Guiden a Scouten in 2017, following the closing down of the second component organization Association des Girl Guides Luxembourgeoises in 2014.

== Members of the federation ==
Members of the federation were

- Association des Girl Guides Luxembourgeoises (AGGL, interreligious, coeducational)
- Lëtzebuerger Guiden a Scouten (LGS, Catholic, coeducational)

Until 1960, only one of them, the AGGL, was a member of the WAGGGS. The AGGL and the Lëtzebuerger Guiden (predecessor of the LGS) formed the joint Bureau des Liaison in 1958, and in 1960 the WAGGGS World Conference transferred the membership to this umbrella federation.

The LGS is also a member of Scouting in Luxembourg (formerly Luxembourg Boy Scouts Association).
