= Lëtzebuerger Guiden a Scouten =

- Scouts and Guides of Luxembourg
- Country: Luxembourg
- Founded: 1919/1994
- Membership: 5,000
- Commissaire général: Anouk Galassi
- Affiliation: Scouting in Luxembourg, World Association of Girl Guides and Girl Scouts
- Website http://www.lgs.lu

The Lëtzebuerger Guiden a Scouten (Scouts and Guides of Luxembourg, LGS) is one of Luxembourg's Scouting and Guiding organizations. It is a member of the federation Scouting in Luxembourg and of the World Association of Girl Guides and Girl Scouts.

The Association is open to all boys and girls without discrimination to race, religion or nationality. Its spiritual ideals are based on Christian beliefs and are recognized by the Catholic Church. The association has about 5,000 members organized in 60 local groups.

== History ==
Catholic Scouting in Luxembourg started in 1913; six years later the Catholic Scout groups founded the Fédération Nationale des Scouts du Luxembourg (National Scout Federation of Luxembourg, FNSL). Catholic Guiding did not start until 1938, when the Catholic Luxembourg Girl Guides (CLGS) was founded.

In 1945, the FNSL and the Fédération Nationale des Eclaireurs du Luxembourg formed the Luxembourg Boy Scouts Association (now Scouting in Luxembourg); thus the FNSL became a member of the World Organization of the Scout Movement. A second umbrella federation for Girl Guides was formed in 1960, when the CLGS and the Association des Girl Guides Luxembourgeoises (AGGL) founded the Bureau de Liaison des Associations Guides du Luxembourg upon which membership in the World Association of Girl Guides and Girl Scouts was transferred.

In 1979, Nicolas Hosch was awarded the Bronze Wolf, the only distinction of the World Organization of the Scout Movement, awarded by the World Scout Committee for exceptional services to world Scouting.

In 1994, the FNSL and the CLGS merged and, together, became known as Lëtzebuerger Guiden a Scouten.

The LGS became a full member of WAGGGS in 2017 following the closing down of the AGGL in 2014.

== Program ==
International activities are an important part of the Scout program. About 90% of the CaraPio summer camps are held abroad. The older members are involved in several development projects in Senegal, Niger, Chile, Bolivia and India. For these projects, the LGS has founded an independent Non-governmental organization, the Guiden a Scouten mat der Drëtter Welt (Guides and Scouts for the Third World).

The association is divided in five sections:

- Biber (Beaver Scouts) – ages 5 to 8
- Wëllefcher (Cub Scouts) – ages 8 to 11
- Aventuren an Explorer (AvEx, Adventurer Guides and Explorer Scouts) – ages 11 to 14
- Caravellen a Pionéier (CaraPio, Caravelle Guides and Pioneer Scouts) – ages 14 to 17
- Ranger a Rover (RaRo, Ranger Guides and Rover Scouts) – ages 17 to 23

The Scout Motto is Emmer Bereet or Toujours Prêt, Always Prepared.

== Scout Oath ==
Ech engagéiere mech,
mäi Liewe sënnvoll ze gestalten a Verantwortung ze iwwerhuelen,
méng Ëmwelt ze respektéieren
a mech fir Fridden a Gerechtegkeet anzesetzen, mech dobäi u Jesus Christus ze orientéieren
an nom Guide/Scoutsgesetz ze liewen.

I promise
to live my life careful and responsible,
to respect my environment,
to engage myself for peace and justice, following the teachings of Jesus Christ
and to live according to the Guide (Scout) Law.

== Scout Law ==
En(g) Guide/Scout ...
A Guide (Scout) ...

- ... as zouverlässeg
  is reliable
- ... as éierlech an fair
  is honest and fair
- ... as bereed ze hëllefen
  is prepared to help
- ... as gutt zu all Mënsch
  is good to all people
- ... mëcht den éischten Schrëtt an setzt sech an vir Gerechtegkeet
  makes the first step and stands up for justice
- ... respektéiert d'Liewen an all ségen Formen
  respects life in all its forms
- ... kann nolauschteren an Kritik erdroen
  is able to listen and respects critics
- ... huet eng positiv Liewesastellung
  shows a positive attitude to life
- ... ka sech organiséieren an mëcht näischt hallef
  is able to organize herself (himself) and finishes his tasks
- ... hält sech kierperlech an geeschteg gesond
  keeps herself (himself) physically and mentally fit

== See also ==
- Wiltz International Scout Centre
