= Jacques Gagey =

Catholic priest

Father Jacques Gagey
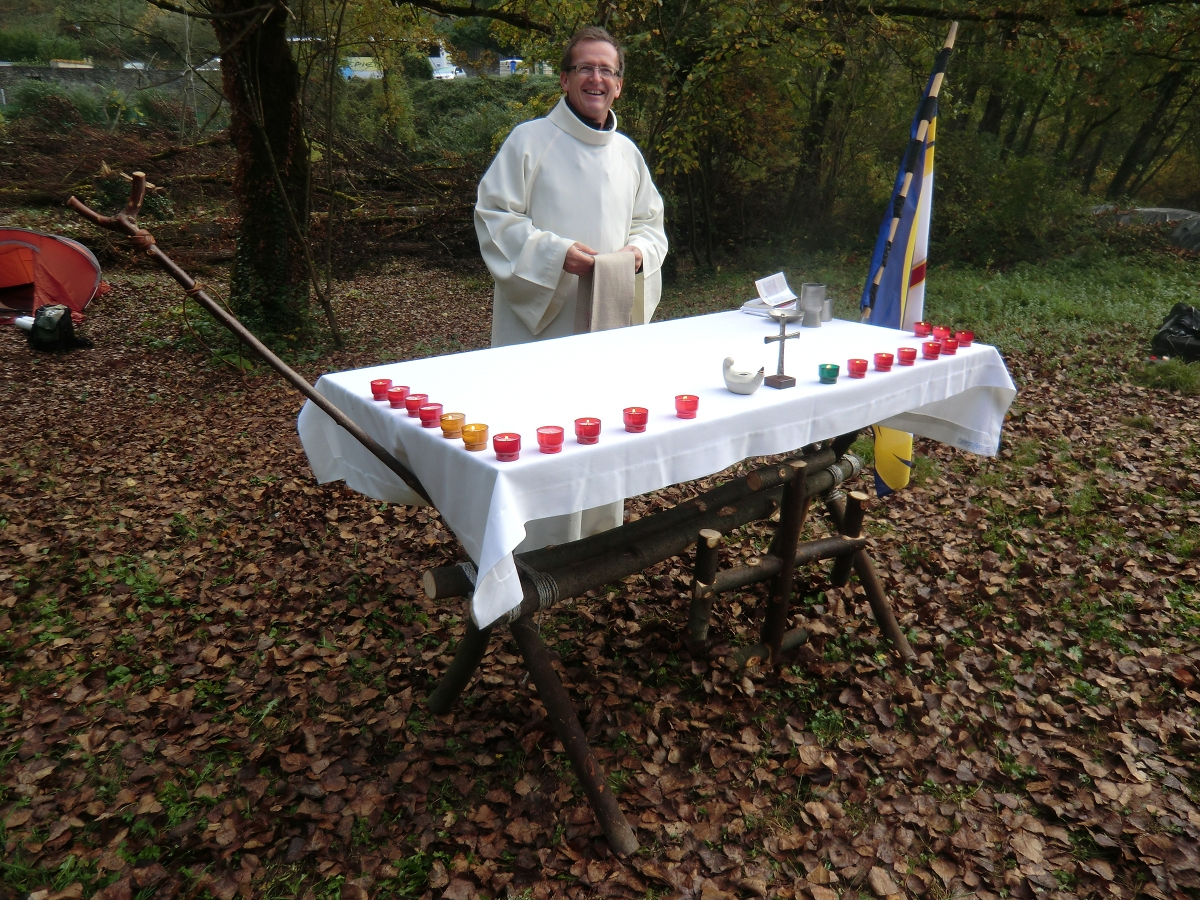
- Father Jacques with a portable altar built with Scout pioneering techniques
- Born: 1954 (age 71–72); Vesoul
- Occupation: Author
- Religion: Roman Catholic
- Church: St. Anne of the Butte-aux-Cailles
- Congregations served: Diocese of Paris

Jacques P. Gagey (born 1954 in Vesoul) is a French Roman Catholic priest of the Archdiocese of Paris and author, who serves as the World Chaplain and World Ecclesiastical Assistant of the International Catholic Conference of Scouting (ICCS), based in Rome, and served as the Chaplain General of the Scouts et Guides de France.

Accused of sexual assault by several women, he was under judicial and canonical investigation from November 2022 to December 2023 when the case was closed without further action.

Gagey was instrumental in the promotion of World Youth Day 1997 in Paris, the pilgrimage to Chartres and the pilgrimage to Vézelay.

He is pastor of St. Anne of the Butte-aux-Cailles in the 13th arrondissement of Paris and chaplain of the French National Coordination of Young Christian Professionals. On 1 September 2007, he succeeded Father Jean-Marie Mallet-Guy in the position of Chaplain General of the Scouts and Guides of France (SGdF). In November 2013, the Board of Scouts and Guides of France appointed a number of those involved in Scouting, including Gagey, as honorary members of the Scouts and Guides of France.

Having reached the end of his second term of three years as Chaplain General of the Scouts and Guides of France, Gagey became deputy ecclesiastical assistant of the International Catholic Conference of Scouting. In 2013, he was appointed chaplain of the International Catholic Conference of Scouting. He succeeded Father Leo A. White of the diocese of Manchester, New Hampshire as ecclesiastical assistant on 1 January 2014.

In his position, he has traveled as far afield as Japan and Curaçao.

== Accusations of sexual assault ==
Three reports from women, accusing the priest of sexual assaults between 1993 and 2002, were forwarded to the religious authorities in 2022. Nevertheless, Pascal Delannoy, bishop of Saint-Denis, decided to appoint Jacques Gagey as parish priest of Pantin in September 2022.

In November 2022, Jacques Gagey was the subject of an investigation for sexual assaults on adult women. His position as parish priest of the church of Saint-Germain de Pantin was then withdrawn. The case was closed without further action on December 1, 2023.
