= Imam al-Mahdi Scouts =

Lebanese youth movement

- Imam al-Mahdi old (original) logo
- Arabic: كشاف الإمام المهدي
- Country: Lebanon
- Founded: 5 May 1985
- Membership: 100,000
- President: Dr. Bilal Naim
- Affiliation: Lebanese Scouting Federation
- Website https://www.almahdiscouts.net

The Imam al-Mahdi Scouts (Arabic: كشاف الإمام المهدي, romanized: Kashafat al-Imam al-Mahdi) is a youth movement that was established in Lebanon on 5 May 1985 by the political organization Hezbollah. It is named for Muhammad al-Mahdi and operates also under the jurisdiction of the Lebanese Ministry of Education

The Imam al-Mahdi Scouts became a member of the Lebanese Scouting Federation and thus of the World Organization of the Scout Movement in 1998. The organization has about 100,000 members of both genders between the ages of 8-16 organized into 500 local groups.

== Program ==
Activities include camping, community service projects such as helping the disabled and cleaning places of worship, computing, fishing, team sports, boxing, reading classes, learning administrative skills, learning about Islam and protecting the environment.

The organization is divided in three sections according to age (youngest to oldest):

- Cubs
- Scouts
- Rangers

Translated into English, the Scout motto is "Together to Serve".

== Emblem and uniform ==
Pre-2010 emblem

The previous emblem of the Imam al-Mahdi Scouts includes the Scout fleur-de-lis, in the top center of which is a hand with an out-turned palm, possibly the Hand of Fatima, and supported on left and right by single scimitars; the text, which says وأطيعوا, meaning "obey". The new emblem changes the color pattern and removes the scimitars.

On 1 January 2007, Fox News reported on the Imam al-Mahdi Scouts. In the report footage, the youth look very much like mainstream Scouts, with uniforms in light and medium blue, white, yellow and purple for different groups, as well as badges similar to mainstream Scouts. The flag of the Imam al-Mahdi Scouts was shown flown from cars and along the roadside and features their emblem.

== Controversy ==
According to Western governments, including the UK and the Israeli Intelligence and Terrorism Information Center (ITIC) at the Center for Special Studies (CSS), the group was examined because of possible links to Hezbollah, which is listed as a terrorist organization. They point to photos showing Scouts with armed fighters and say that political and military ideas are taught to children as young as four. In the past, the Scouts’ emblem showed swords and the word “Obey!”, which suggested a military mindset. Later, the emblem was changed to include Lebanon’s cedar tree to look less aggressive. Critics, including German researcher Peter Conzen, compare the group to the Hitler Youth, arguing that it uses children to promote extreme beliefs.

The movement's instructing tens of thousands of children and teenagers in military tactics and that they are "indoctrinated with the principles of radical Iranian Islam" at summer training camps in Shi'a communities in Beirut, the Beqaa Valley and south Lebanon.

The ITIC reports that male Imam al-Mahdi Scouts turning 17 make their way into Hezbollah's fighting ranks and that information appearing on the Imam al-Mahdi Scouts calendar notes more than 120 of the Scout’s members died as shaheeds in Hezbollah militant activity, including suicide bombers (supported by English version of site); however, a Fox report said very few of the Scouts are actually chosen. In an interview with an Al Jazeera journalist, a Scout leader stated that there was no obligation for Scouts to join the armed militants.

Another source for the involvement of the association in Hezbollah militant activity is a report published in Egyptian weekly Roz Al-Yusuf on 18 August 2006 by Mirfat Al-Hakim.

Robert F. Worth discussed the connections of the Mahdi Scouts with the Hezbollah in an article published in Scotland On Sunday on 23 November 2008. In this article, Bilal Naim, Hezbollah's former director for the Mahdi Scouts is cited: "After age 16 the boys mostly go to resistance or military activities".

== See also ==
- International Union of Muslim Scouts
