= International Union of Muslim Scouts =

Islamic organization based in Saudi Arabia

- Headquarters: Jeddah, Saudi Arabia
- Country: International

The International Union of Muslim Scouts (IUMS; Arabic: الإتحاد العالمي للكشاف المسلم) is an autonomous, international body committed to promoting and supporting Islam within Scouting. Its headquarters are in Jeddah, Saudi Arabia.

== Establishment ==
The idea was first sparked in the 3rd Islamic Conference Summit, held in Taif, KSA (1981).

As a response Qatar Scout association called for the first Islamic conference together with 1st Islamic Jamboree (Doha - January 1982). Establishment officially declared in Amman, Jordan (1989), during the 3rd International Muslim Scouts Conference. In August 1992, the 6th International Scout Conference, in Pakistan, certified the emblem, organization and the statutes of the IUMS.

== Objectives ==
The official objectives of IUMS are:

- To develop an education curriculum that should contribute to structure and build the spiritual dimension in the personalities of young Muslims.
- To motivate and promote Islamic Scouting on global basis.
- To extend coordination and cooperation among IUMS members.
- To promote and coordinate social, humanitarian and relief activities within the Union or in cooperation with non-Scout organisations of similar nature.
- To introduce Islamic Scouting in such states where Muslims are residing.
- To develop and promote the spirit of brotherhood and understanding among Muslim Scouts.

== Leadership training ==
Since 2006, IUMS has held an annual leadership training course in Switzerland, in conjunction with other organisations.

== See also ==
- Religion in Scouting
- Imam al-Mahdi Scouts
- Muslim Scout Association (Lebanon)
- Muslim Scouts of France
