= Lebanese Scouting Federation =

National federation of Scouting in Lebanon

Lebanese Scouting Federation French: Fédération du scoutisme libanais Arabic: إتحاد كشاف لبنان
- Country: Lebanon
- Founded: 1961
- Membership: 14,334
- President: Youssef Khadaj
- Vice President: Elie Melki Youssef
- Secretary General: Said Maaliki
- Affiliation: World Organization of the Scout Movement

The Lebanese Scouting Federation (French: Fédération du scoutisme libanais, Arabic: إتحاد كشاف لبنان), is the national federation of 29 Scouting organisations of Lebanon, founded in 1961. Lebanon became a member of the World Organization of the Scout Movement in 1947.

== History ==
Scouting was introduced in Lebanon by two teachers, Abdul Satar and Mohammad Abdul Jabbar Khairy who received support from Toufik El Hibri. They came to Lebanon from England in 1912 and established the first Scout troop in the school owned by El Hibri, where they worked. This troop had many activities, later including a trip to Istanbul, Ottoman Empire, where they met with Sultan Mehmed V. Members of this troop played an important role in spreading the Scouting and Guiding movement in Lebanon and other countries.

After Lebanon gained its independence in 1943, Scouting further spread rapidly to cover every part of the country.

During the Lebanese civil war, Scouts from all associations played an important role in helping civilians, distributing food, medicine, and other forms of aid to refugees. Some Scouting associations formed first aid groups that helped the wounded. Scouts also participated in peace campaigns to help put an end to that war. During the war, Scouts from all sides of the conflict remained brothers and remained in contact with each other, manifesting a good example of unity for all Lebanese. All this added to the reputation of Scouting in Lebanon, with Lebanese people tending to respect Scouts and many parents encouraging their children to join the movement.

Today, years after the end of the civil war, Scouting in Lebanon still faces great tasks, with Lebanon being involved in large reconstruction plans aimed to erase effects of the war and to enable it to regain its advanced role in the region and the world. The role of the Scouts include promoting peace and unity through campaigns and summer camps for youth and children.

In 1973, Muhammad El Hibri was awarded the Bronze Wolf, the only distinction of the World Organization of the Scout Movement, awarded by the World Scout Committee for exceptional services to world Scouting. Other recipients include Dr. Farid Karam in 1977 and Rashid Shoucair in 1981.

The Arab Regional Jamboree was planned to be held in Lebanon in August 2006. However, without a stable and peaceful environment, the leaders of the Arab Scout Region decided to defer the date of the event to be in Beirut during 2007.

== Organisation ==
=== Membership ===
The following 30 organisations are members of the federation, including an overall estimated membership of 100,000 Scouts: while the membership number reported to the World Organization of the Scout Movement stood at 14,334 Scouts in 2005.

- Al-Aamiely Scouts - Scouts al Amily
- Al-Etihady Lebanese Scouts
- Al-Jarrah Scouts in Lebanon - Scouts Al Jarrah
- Al-Mabarrat Scouts
- Al-Mahaba Scouts
- Al Mashari Scouts Association - Scouts des Macharihs
- Al-Nahda Scouts
- Al-Sahel Scouts in Lebanon
- Al-Takadomy Scouts
- Association of Arab Scouts in Lebanon - Association des Scouts arabes au Liban
- Byblos Scout - Scouts de Byblos
- Cedars Scouts - Scouts des Cèdres
- Christian Scouts - Scouts Chrétiens
- Environmental Scouts
- Future Lebanon Scouts - Scouts du Liban futur
- Imam al-Mahdi Scouts
- Independence Scouts - Scouts de l'Indépendance
- Islamic Risala Scout Association
- Lebanese Eghatha Scouts
- Lebanese Scout Association
- Lebanese Syriac Scouts - Scouts syriaques libanais
- Lycée National Scout Association - Scouts du Lycée National
- Makassed Islamic Scout Organization - Scouts musulmans du Makkassed
- Maronite Scouts - Scouts maronites
- Muslim Scout Association of Lebanon
- National Education Scouts - Scouts de l'Education Nationale
- National Lebanese Scouts - Scouts nationaux libanais
- National Orthodox Scout Association - Scout national orthodoxe
- Orthodox Scouts of Beirut - Scouts Orthodoxes de Beyrouth
- Progressive Scout Association
- Scouts de Secours
- Scouts of Homenetmen Lebanon - Scouts Homentmens
- Scouts of Lebanon - Les Scouts du Liban

== Insignia ==
The membership badge of the Lebanese Scouting Federation and many of the member Scout emblems incorporate the Cedar of Lebanon, the national symbol.

The Scout Motto is Be Prepared (French: Toujours Prêt, Arabic: كن مستعداً, Kun Musta'idan), and also Always Ready in Armenian. The Arabic language noun for a single Scout is Kashaf (Arabic: كشاف).

== See also ==
- Fédération Libanaise des Eclaireuses et des Guides
- Georges El Ghorayeb
- Sarah Rita Kattan
