= Scouts' Day =

Day to celebrate the founding of Scouting

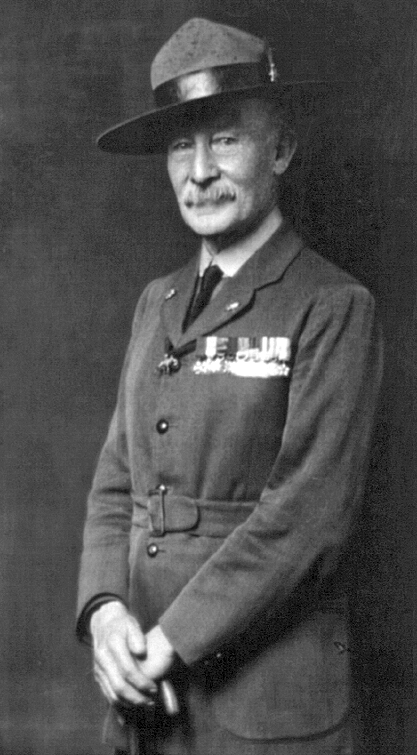
- Baden-Powell, the founder of the Scout Movement

Scouts' Day or Guides' Day is a generic term for special days observed by members of the Scouting movement throughout the year. Some of these days have religious significance, while others may be a simple celebration of Scouting. Typically, it is a day when all members of Scouting will re-affirm the Scout Promise.

== Founders' Days ==
Worldwide in nearly all Scout associations, Founders' Day is celebrated on February 22, the birthday of Robert Baden-Powell, 1st Baron Baden-Powell (born in 1857), the founder of Scouting, and coincidentally also of his wife Olave Baden-Powell (born in 1889). In Kenya, the grave of Baden Powell has become a pilgrimage site, and each year, the members of the Kenya Scouts Association and Kenya Girl Guides Association celebrate Scouting at the grave.

Individual associations also celebrate their own founding on other dates, although these are generally restricted to "major" anniversaries, such as a decennial. Girl Scouts of the USA celebrate Founders Day on 31 October, the birthday of Juliette Gordon Low.

== World Thinking Day ==
Thinking Day is celebrated on 22 February. The World Association of Girl Guides and Girl Scouts (WAGGGS) chose the date as it was the birthday of Scouting and Guiding founder Robert Baden-Powell and of Olave Baden-Powell. It is thus celebrated by Girl Guides and Girl Scouts associations. SAGNOs (those associations which are part simultaneously of WAGGGS and WOSM) usually take part in it. It is also celebrated by some boy-oriented scout associations belonging to WOSM (i.e. Greece, where it is called Imera Skepseos),

== Saint George's Day ==
Portuguese Scout postcard casting Scout as modern-day St. George slaying the dragon

Saint George is the patron saint of Scouting. The nearest Sunday to 23 April is observed as a celebration in some countries, for example, the United Kingdom, Portugal, Brazil and Spain. After Founder's Day, it's the biggest celebration in National Scout Organizations.

In the UK many Scouting Districts celebrate the day with a parade of the groups and sections to a church or other suitable venue, often outdoors, where a service is held where the Scout sections all re-affirm their Scout Promises.

However, it is becoming more difficult to encourage participation by the youth membership, so many Districts forego the parade and church service in place of a more family oriented day. The focus of the day is still the affirmation of the Promise by all members.

Windsor and Queen Scouts

Each St. George's Day is also marked by a service in St. George's Chapel in Windsor Castle, which is open to all recipients of the Queen's Scout Award in the previous year.

== Scout Sunday, Scout Jumuah, and Scout Sabbath (Boy Scouts of America) ==
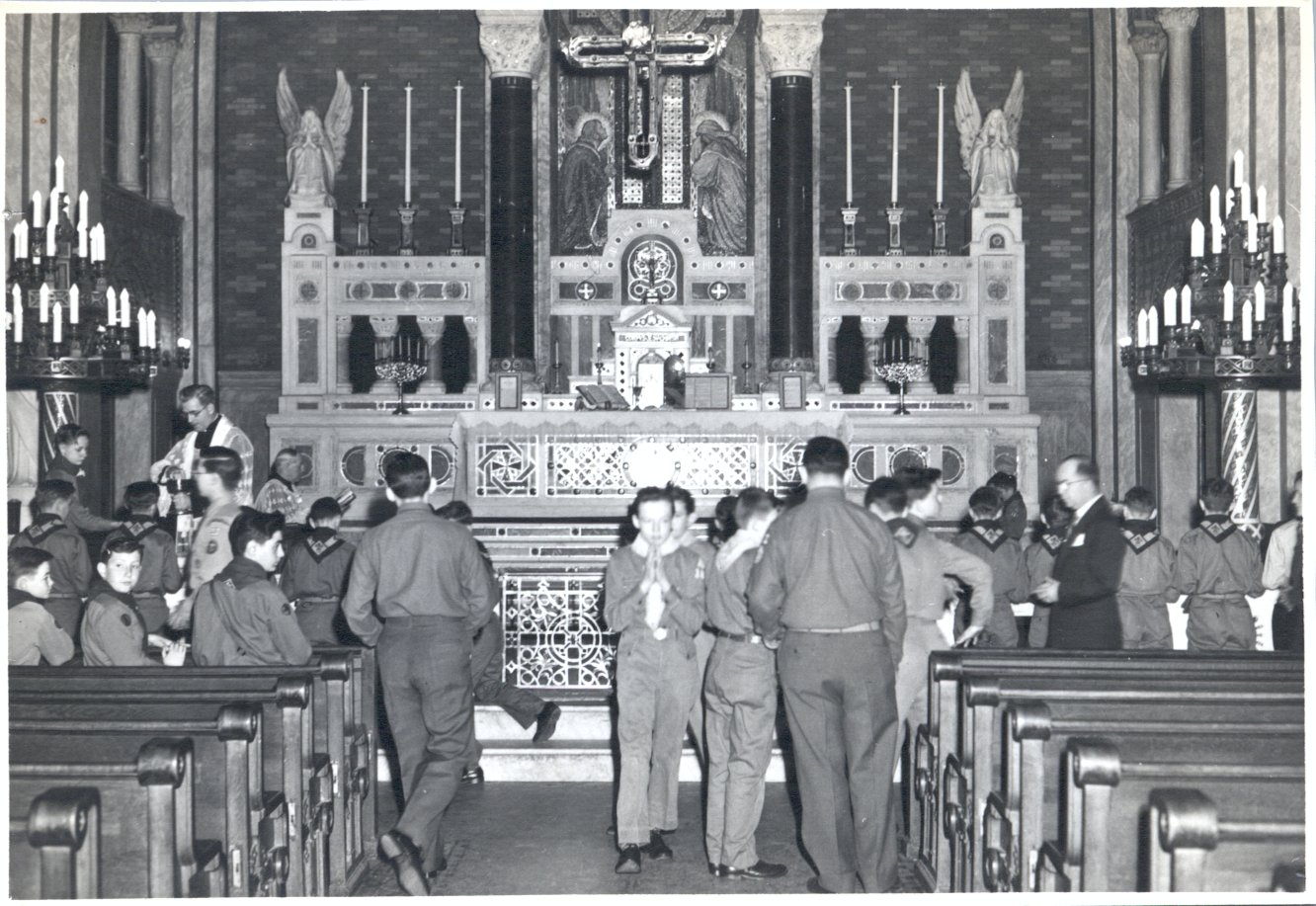
Scouts on Scout Sunday in Philadelphia, 1949

The Boy Scouts of America have designated the Sunday preceding 8 February, or 8 February if it is a Sunday, as Scout Sunday, the following Friday as Scout Jumuah, and the following Saturday is designated as Scout Sabbath. The United Methodist Church and the Presbyterian Church (USA) celebrate Scout Sunday on the second Sunday of February as not to conflict with their Transfiguration Sunday.

The day is meant to mark the founding of the Scouts in the United States. Observation varies by unit and locale. Scouts go to their places of worship in uniform and help with the service.

In the United States, Scouting has been used by churches, temples, synagogues, and many other religious organizations as part of their youth ministries. Approximately 50 percent of all Scouting units are chartered to religious groups. These observances offer an opportunity for congregations to honor Scouts and Scouters, as well as to learn more themselves about the value of Scouting as a youth program.

== Girl Scout Week (Girl Scouts of the USA) ==
In the Girl Scouts of the USA, the equivalent holiday is Girl Scout Sunday or Girl Scout Sabbath, celebrated in Girl Scout Week the week that includes 12 March, the day the first Girl Scout troop was founded by Juliette Gordon Low in Savannah, Georgia in 1912.

== Scout-Guide Week (Canada) ==
In Canada both the Guides and the Scouts celebrate Scout-Guide Week which is the week (Sunday-Sunday) in which 22 February falls (not including the first Sunday). It is often used to have joint events between the two groups.

== Africa Scout Day ==
Africa Scout Day is a day of celebration for Scouts in Africa and is held annually on 13 March. At the 62nd ordinary session of the Council of Ministers of the then OAU, (currently African Union) in Addis Ababa in 1995, a resolution was passed that Scouting in Africa must be recognized and as such 13 March would be celebrated as Africa Scout Day.

== World Scout Scarf Day ==
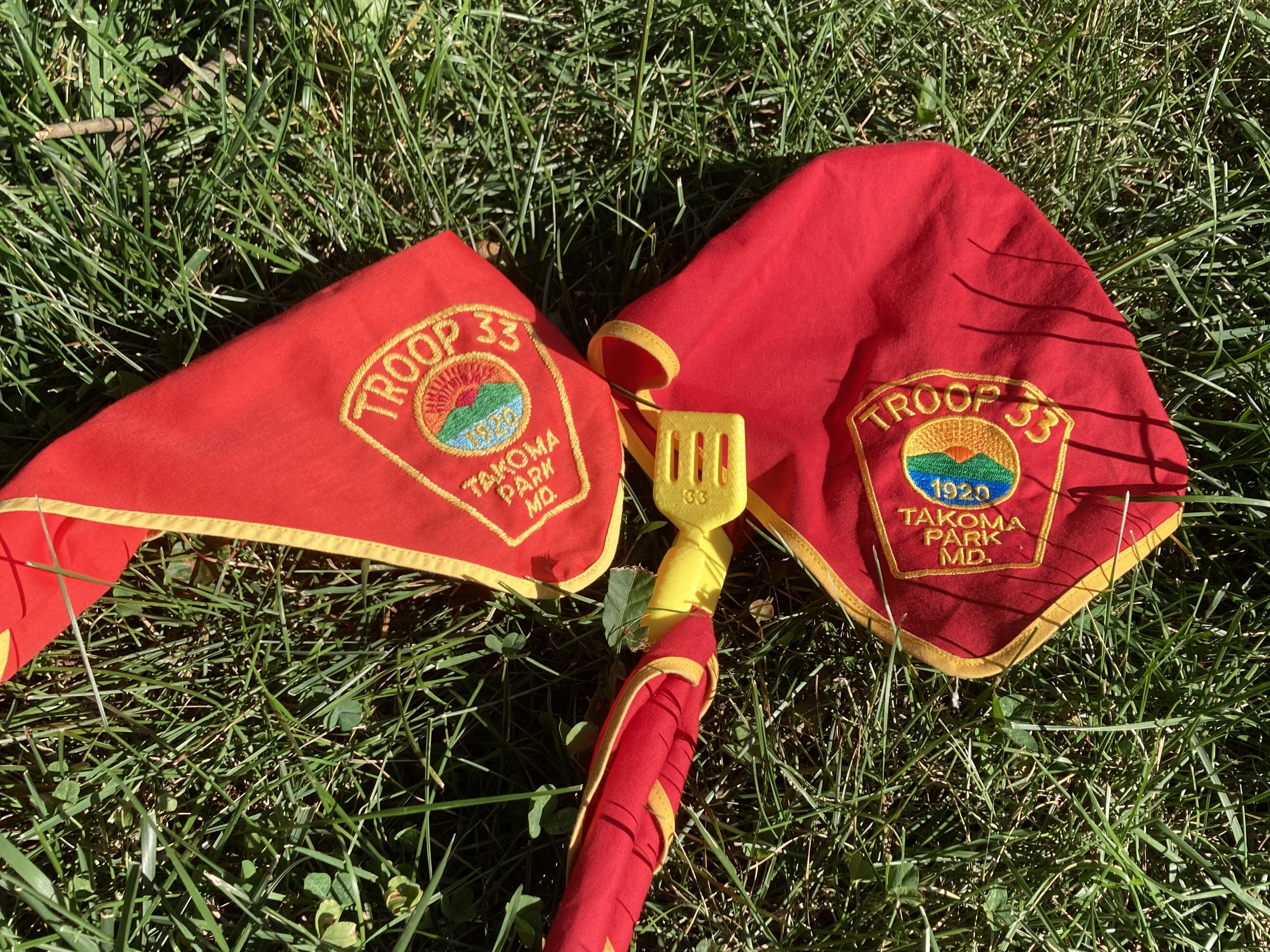
Neckerchiefs from Maryland

World Scout Scarf Day, August 1st, commemorates the first Scout Camp on Brownsea Island in 1907.

On World Scout Scarf Day, all active and former scouts are encouraged to wear their scarfs, or neckerchiefs as a visible commemoration of Scouting.

== Scout Service and Public Relationship Week (Sri Lanka) ==
Scout Service and Public Relationship Week is held annually on June–July. Scouts will call on the public during this week in uniform. The event began with the participation of Scouts from all 37 districts simultaneously numbering approximately 40,000 between the ages of 7 and 18. A Patrol consisting of four Scouts or more in uniform will carry an official card given by Sri Lanka Scout Association for public contributions. Scouts find money for their Scout Group through the Service and Relationship week each year. They go to houses and work places and help their owners with small work they can do. People give them work and then give some amount of money for their effort. The association requests the public to contribute to them generously as this is the main fund raising project for them.

== Dates celebrated by country ==
Date	English name	Location/local name	Remarks
1 January	Scouts' Day	Burma	
8 February	Scouts' Day	United States	Marks the founding of the Boy Scouts of America in 1910
22 February	Thinking Day	worldwide (Guides)	Marks shared birthday of Scouting's founders
22 February	Founder's Day	worldwide (Scouts)	Marks shared birthday of Scouting's founders
5 March	Scouts' Day	Republic of China (Taiwan)	
12 March	Girl Scout Birthday	United States	Marks founding of first Girl Scout troop in the United States
18 April	Scouts' Day	Armenia	Social and Scouting work take place in one of the central parks of Yerevan
19 April	Guides' Day	Georgia	anniversary of the first national Girl Guide conference in 1997
19 April	Scouts' Day	Azerbaijan	/regional_and_national_events_of_eurasia_region
23 April	St. George's Day	United Kingdom	Parade of King's Scouts at Windsor Castle
23 April	St. George's Day	Denmark	Parades and recommitting to the Scout's promise
23 April	Scouts' Day	Mexico	
23 April	Scouts' Day	Brazil	
24 April	St. George's Day	Czech Republic	Celebrated on April 24 because April 23 is the feast of Czech national saint Adalbert of Prague
18 May	Scouts' Day	Turkiye	Turkiye Scouts who were martyred in Gallipoli in 1915 during the First World War are commemorated.
19 May	Scouts' Day	Croatia	first training in 1950
22 May	Girl Scout Day	Japan	
30 May	National Scout Day	Maldives	Scouting began in First Male' Scout Group, Majeediyya School
31 May	Vietnamese Scouting Day	Vietnam	
22 February	Founder's Day / Thinker's Day	Portugal	Day observed by all scout and guide associations.
23 April	Saint George's Day	Portugal	Day observed as "Scout Day" at Portugal.
27 May	Anniversary of the Founding of the Portuguese Catholic Scouting Association	Portugal	Day observed by the Portuguese Catholic Scouting Association (Corpo Nacional de Escutas), the biggest scout association in Portugal.
late May	Scout Movement Week	Liberia	In 2009 was 25–30 May
1 July	Scouts' Day	Thailand	Scouts pay homage to King Rama VI, and take part in parades
3 July	Scouts' Day	Nepal	2009 was 57th Scout Day
1 August	World Scout Day	worldwide (Scouts & Guides)	World Scout Day is named officially by the WOSM. And World Scout Scarf Day was not officially recognized by any Scout Association.
1 August	World Scout Day	Australia	Day that Scouts Australia announce and celebrate Adult Recognition Awards for the year nationwide
14 August	Pramuka Day	Indonesia	Honors the national scouts of Indonesia (Pramuka) first public parade in 1961
5 September	Scout and Good Action Day	Argentina	Celebrates the scout and good act day doing charity work, donations and personal good action.
5 September	Scouts' Union Day	Turkiye	At the beginning of the new Scout season, it is the day when the Scouts come together and celebrate the foundation anniversary of the Scouts Union of Turkiye, which was established in 1955.
October	Scouting Month	Philippines	The Boy Scouts of the Philippines was chartered by Congress on 31 October 1936. The October celebrations also serve as a observance of the May 26, 1940 formation of the Girl Scouts of the Philippines, whose formation the BSP assisted (May 26 falls during the summer vacation period for basic and secondary education schools and the final examination period for most colleges and universities). The GSP also has its own Girl Scouts Day/Founder's Day on September 20, honoring foundress Josefa Llanes Escoda. Defacto, Scouts' Day, alongside the international August 1 and February 22 celebrations, is marked in the country on either October 24, United Nations Day, or the Friday nearest October 24, as October 31, Halloween, is a schools holiday.
variable	Girl Guides Day	Brunei	First was 6 October 1985, chosen to be near their royal patron's birthday

== See also ==
- Religion in Scouting
- Scout Law – A Scout is reverent.
- Scouting 2007 Centenary – celebrations for 100 years of Scouting
