= Kenya Scouts Association =

National Scouting association of Kenya

- Headquarters: Rowallan National Scouts Camp
- Country: Kenya
- Founded: 24 November 1910
- Founder: Lord Baden Powell
- Membership: 323,929
- Patron: William Samoei Ruto (ex officio)
- Chief Scout: Jacob Kaimenyi
- Chief Commissioner: Victor Radido
- Affiliation: World Organization of the Scout Movement
- Website kenyascouts.org

The Kenya Scouts Association is the national Scouting association of Kenya. Scouting was founded in British East Africa in 1910 and became a member of the World Organization of the Scout Movement in 1964. It had 323,929 members (as of 2010).

== History ==
The late Sir Robert Stephenson Smyth Baden-Powell, and his wife Olave, visited Kenya in 1935 on the way to South Africa, and spent time in Nyeri, near Mount Kenya, where his former personal secretary Eric Sherbrooke Walker ran a hotel. They returned in 1937, and at the end of 1938, he and Olave retired to Paxtu cottage, built specially for them at Nyeri. Lord and Lady Baden-Powell lived there until his death on 8 January 1941 and are buried at Nyeri. His gravestone bears a circle with a dot in the center, which is the trail sign for "I have gone home":

Lady Baden-Powell moved back to England after his death, but is buried beside Lord Baden-Powell. Baden-Powell's Paxtu cottage, now a small museum, stands on the grounds of the Outspan Hotel. For years it served as a WAGGGS World Center.

In 1982, J.J.M. Nyagah was awarded the Bronze Wolf Award, the only distinction of the World Organization of the Scout Movement, awarded by the World Scout Committee for exceptional services to world Scouting fraternity.

== Program ==
Scouting in Kenya focuses on urban and rural community development needs. Community service is required for the early rank advancement and includes hospital visits, blood donations, helping the aged, planting trees, adult literacy campaigns, road and bridge construction, first aid training, building schools and homes for the aged, as well as many other projects. The conservation of nature is a major program emphasis. The senior conservation badge is a required badge in order to earn the highest rank, Lion Scout. Scouting in Kenya is a co-educational programme, open to both boys and girls.

The Scout Motto is Uwe Tayari, which means "Be Prepared" in Swahili.

=== Age divisions ===
- Sungura (Cubs) - 6–11 years
- Chipukizi (Scouts) - 12–15 years
- Mwamba (Senior Scouts) - 16–18 years
- Jasiri Rovers -18-24

==== Sungura Scouts ====
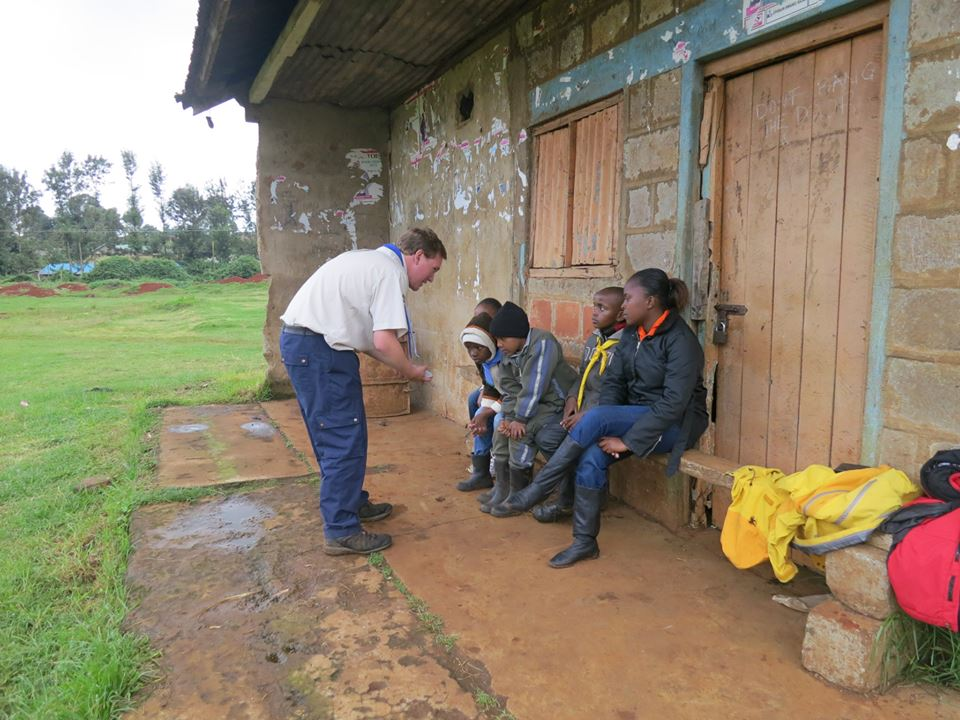
An English leader explaining about Scouting in the UK to a group of Sungura Scouts in Karatina

Sungura is the Swahili word for rabbit and the section is the equivalent of Cub Scouts. Sungura Scouts wear a yellow scarf with the Kenya Scout Associations logo printed on it. There are boy and girl versions of the Sungura Scout Uniform as well as an Air Scout and Casual Dress alternative.

The Sungura stage is aimed at instilling the fundamental basics of Scouting in the young person and fostering the spirit of brotherhood, respect for God, and patriotism.

When a young person shows an interest in joining Sungura Scouts they enter a pre-investiture period where they learn the fundamentals of the section. This includes learning the Sungura Scout: Law; Promise; Motto; Salute & Sign and a brief history of Scouting within Kenya.

===== Ideals =====
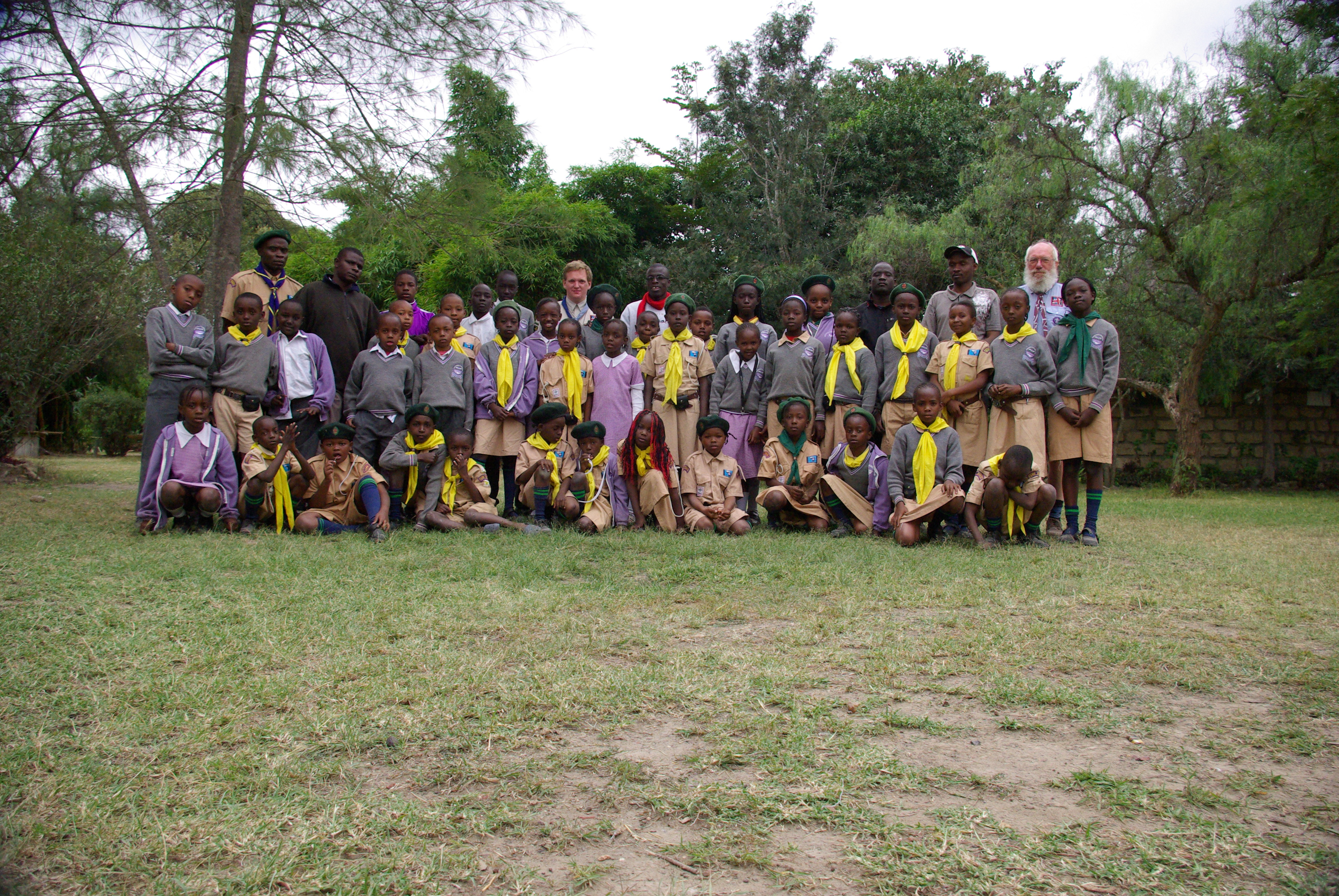
A group shot of a school-based Sungura Scout section on their camp in Kenya

Sungura Scout Promise

I promise to do my best;
To do my duty to God and my Country;
To help others every day;
To obey the sungura laws of scouts.

Sungura Scout Law

Sungura Scouts obey their leaders,
Think of others before themselves, and
Always do their best.

The Sungura Scout Motto

"Do Your Best"

===== Badges =====
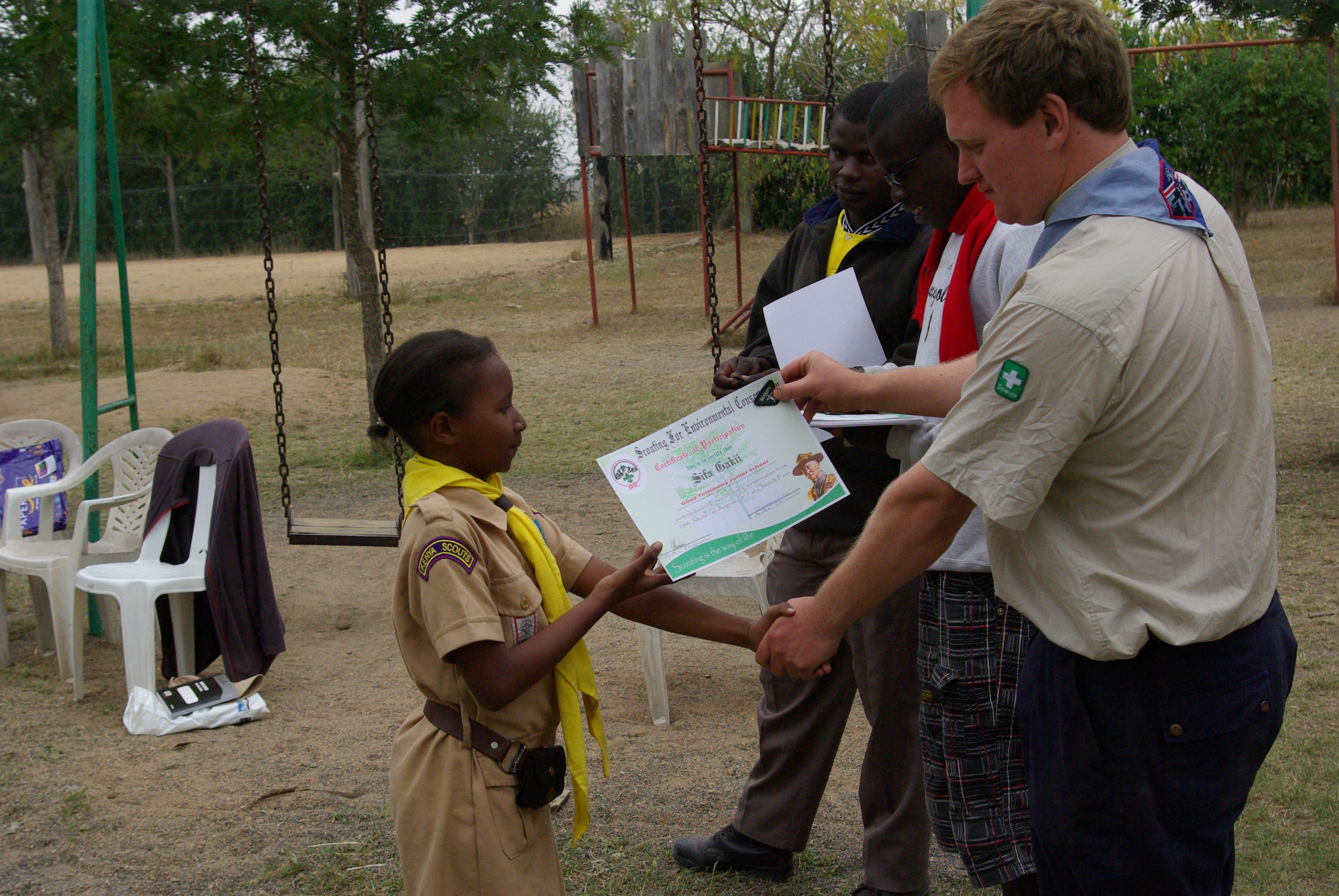
A Kenyan Sungura Scout receiving their badge and certificate during an Award Ceremony at the end of a camp

Th principle Sungura Scout Badges are the 3 stages of the Nyota badge. To gain these badges the Scout must demonstrate an understanding of: Scouting Skills; Conservation; Health and Sanitation; Physical Development; Scouting Spirit; Spiritual Development; Citizenship; Education and Literacy; Agriculture and Reproductive Health Education. Each of these badges in turn requires an increased understanding of these areas. (A full break down of badge requirements can be found in the Sungura Scout Leader's Handbook.

Sungura Scouts also have the opportunity to gain a number of Proficiency Badges. As with the Nyota Staged Badges many of the Proficiency Badges focus on areas that will help the Scouts care for themselves and to stay fit and healthy. The Sungura Proficiency Badges are: Animal Husbandry; Artist; Athlete; Child Health; Computerist (this covers basic computer usage); Cyclist; Drug Abuse Prevention; Elimu (this is about reading and writing); Entertainer; First Aider; Fisherman; Guide; Handicraft; Handyman; Horse Orderly; Linguist (foreign languages); Mkulima (basic agricultural skills); Musician; Mwanainchi (patriotism); Obeserver; Photographer; Reproductive Health Education; Signaller (woodcraft and codes); Sportsman; Swimmer and Utamaduni (culture and traditions).

Sungura Scouts can also earn the Link Badge once they have complete their Nyota III badge and three Proficiency Badges (which must include one of the following: First Aider; Mwananchi; Elimu or Handyman). This badge is worn on the right breast above the pocket and may be worn in the Chipukizi Section until the Chui Badge is earned. Upon completion of the Link Badge the Sungura Scout graduates to the Chipukizi Section.

=== Extension Scouts ===
The KSA runs the Extension Scout Program, or Street Scouts as it is often called. In 2007, about 4,000 children were enrolled and the number was growing. The program organises Scout groups for street children. The program also reaches out to children that go to orphanages during the day, but live on the streets at night. Children learn life skills as well as receiving basic health care. They can get practical job training and support to re-enter the education system. In some cases, children have been re-united with their families. The program has been so successful that it has spread to other countries, including Uganda and Tanzania.

Scouts Canada has been helping the KSA run the Street Scouts for several years. Ten Street Scouts attended the 11th Canadian Scout Jamboree in 2007.

== Events ==
Each year on February 22, members of the Association and Kenya Girl Guides Association gather in Nyeri, at the grave of Baden Powell, to celebrate Founders' Day at the grave.

== See also ==
- Scouting and Guiding in Kenya
- Elizabeth Nyaruai
- Kinuthia Murugu, former director of World Scout Bureau's Africa Regional Office
