= Seychelles Scout Association =

National Scouting organization of the Seychelles

- The Scout emblem features the coco de mer, the sea coconut
- Headquarters: Victoria
- Country: Seychelles
- Founded: 1927/1994
- Membership: 372
- Chief Scout: John Marie
- Chief Commissioner: Betty-Mai Sofa
- Affiliation: WOSM
- Website seyscouts.org.sc

The Seychelles Scout Association (SSA) is the national Scouting organization of the Seychelles. Scouting in Seychelles was founded in 1927 and became a member of the World Organization of the Scout Movement (WOSM) in 2002. The association has 372 members (as of 2011).

== History ==
Scouting in Seychelles started in 1927 as an overseas branch of The Scout Association (UK) and aimed mainly to British boys. Later it was opened to all boys. In 1977, Scouting was banned by the government of the now independent country.

The Scout movement was readmitted in 1994 and became a member of WOSM in 2002. Since 1998, the SSA is twinned to the Greater London South West County of the Scout Association (UK).

== Program ==
=== Program sections ===
The association is divided in three age-groups:

- Cub Scouts (ages 7 to 11)
- Boy Scouts (ages 12 to 15)
- Rover Scouts (ages 16 to 20)

=== Scout Motto ===
As English and French are official languages of the Seychelles, the Scout Motto is Be Prepared (English) and Sois Prêt (French).

=== Scout Promise ===
On my honour, I promise that I will do my best,
to do my duty to God and to my country,
to help other people
and to keep the Scout Law.

=== Scout Law ===
- A Scout's honour is to be trusted.
- A Scout is loyal.
- A Scout's duty is to be useful and to help others.
- A Scout is a friend to all and a brother to every other Scout.
- A Scout is courteous.
- A Scout is a friend to animals.
- A Scout obeys orders of his parents, patrol leaders or Scoutmaster without question.
- A Scout smiles and whistles under all difficulties.
- A Scout is thrifty.
- A Scout is clean in thought, word and deed.

== Organization ==
The association is headed by the Chief Scout and the Chief Commissioner. (Bernard Elizabeth) Chief Scout. Current Chief Commissioner is Regis Gontier.

In 2008, the association consisted of 16 Scout troops which were organised in 4 areas:

- Central Region
- Northern Region
- Praslin - La Digue
- Western Region

Within the structures of WOSM, the Seychelles Scout Association is member of the Africa Scout Region. In July 2006, Rubina Marivonne Haroon, who was born in the Seychelles, was appointed Regional Director for the World Scout Bureau Africa Regional Office.
