= Scouting and Guiding in Mozambique =

Scouting and Guiding associations in Mozambique

The Scout and Guide movement in Mozambique is served by the following organisations:

- the Mozambique Guides, association "working towards WAGGGS membership"
- the Liga dos Escuteiros de Moçambique, member of the World Organization of the Scout Movement
