= Scouting and Guiding in Kenya =

Scouting and Guiding associations in Kenya

The Scout and Guide movement in Kenya is served by

- Kenya Girl Guides Association, member of the World Association of Girl Guides and Girl Scouts
- The Kenya Scouts Association, member of the World Organization of the Scout Movement

The Africa Region of the World Organization of the Scout Movement has its main office in Nairobi, Kenya.

== International Scouting units in Kenya ==
In addition, there are American Boy Scouts in Nairobi, linked to the Direct Service branch of the Boy Scouts of America, which supports units around the world.

== See also ==
- Elizabeth Nyaruai
- Jeremiah J.M. Nyagah
