= EGSA =

EGSA may refer to:

- EGSA Alger
- Ethiopia Girl Scout Association
- Egyptian Space Agency
- The ICAO four letter airport code for Shipdham Airfield in Norfolk.
