= Africa Scout Jamboree =

African large-scale youth event

The Africa Scout Region of the World Organization of the Scout Movement has run or sponsored region-wide Africa Scout Jamborees in its member countries.

== List of Africa Scout Jamborees ==
| Event | Location | Country | Dates |
|---|---|---|---|
| Central African Jamboree | Ruwa Park | Rhodesia | May 4 to 11, 1959 |
| 1st All-Africa Jamboree | Jos | Nigeria | 1976 |
| 2nd All-Africa Jamboree | Kaazi | Uganda | 1989 |
| 3rd All-Africa Jamboree | Accra | Ghana | 1994 |
| 4th All-Africa Jamboree | Nairobi | Kenya | August 9 to 19, 2000 |
| 5th All-Africa Jamboree | Catembe | Mozambique | July 21 to 31, 2006 |
| 6th Africa Scout Jamboree | Gitega | Burundi | July 28 to August 5, 2012 |
| 7th Africa Scout Jamboree | Yamoussoukro | Côte d’Ivoire | August 1 to 10, 2016 |
| 8th Africa Scout Jamboree | Kampala and Virtual | Uganda | July 29 to August 3, 2021 |
| 9th Africa Scout Jamboree | Gitega | Burundi | August 2 to 11, 2024 |

== Africa Rover Moot ==
In recent years, the Region has organised and sponsored region-wide rover moots. Past Moots include:

- 1st Africa Rover Moot - Rowallan National Scouts Camp in Nairobi, Kenya - April 15 to 25, 2023
- 2nd Africa Rover Moot - Arrowe Park in Johannesburg, South Africa - August 1 to 8, 2026
