= Ethiopia Scout Association =

National Ethiopian Scouts organization

- Country: Ethiopia
- Founded: 1933/1948
- Membership: 67,250
- Chief Scout: Dr. B.T. Costantinos
- Chief Commissioner: Dr. W.A. Davis
- Affiliation: World Organization of the Scout Movement
- Website; Ethiopia Scouts

The Ethiopia Scout Association (Amharic: የኢትዮጵያ እስካውት ማህበር, romanized: ye’ītiyop’iya isikawiti mahiberi) is the national Scouting association of Ethiopia. The Scout movement was first introduced in Ethiopia around 1919, and had opened a school in Addis Ababa by 1934. However, the association was forced to end its activities due to the Second Italo-Abyssinian War of 1935-1936. Scouting was revived in Ethiopia in 1948, when Scout activities gained a foothold in the schools of Ethiopia. Ethiopia was recognized as a member of the World Organization of the Scout Movement in 1969.

== History ==
Alternate version of the membership badge of the Ethiopia Scout Association

Ethiopia's Emperor Haile Selassie I in his autobiography, My Life and Ethiopia's Progress (Vol. I), refers to his establishment of the Scouts some time around 1919 (when he was Regent of Ethiopia and known as Ras Tafari), as part of the Modernization of Ethiopia:

In previous times, all men who were soldiers were so only by custom, but there was no military school. But from 1911 [Ethiopian Calendar (1918/19 Gregorian calendar)] onwards, We established a military college and saw to it that the soldiers should learn the entire military craft at the college. In addition to this We set up, under the auspices of Our son Makonnen, Duke of Harar, a Boy Scouts movement, so that boys should carry out their duties well.

Ethiopian Scouts assisted during the nation's droughts and famines in the 1970s and 1980s, as well as literacy campaigns and other community services. In the 1970s, Ethiopian Scouts established a new training and camping center at Lake Langano. The Ethiopia Scout Association experienced its second demise in the early 1970s, when the Marxist Derg regime dissolved the association and confiscated its properties and funds, claiming that the values of faith enshrined in the Scout promises were incompatible with the philosophy pursued by the new regime.

After twenty years of effort, with the emergence of the democratic system, and in accordance with the proclamation number 512/59, the Ethiopia Scout Association was re-established in 1995. The 35th World Scout Conference, convened in Durban, South Africa July 26–30, 1999, voted to remove Ethiopia from WOSM membership because the national Scout organization had ceased to exist (although earlier that year an Ethiopian contingent had attended the World Scout Jamboree in Chile). The Ethiopia Scout Association was readmitted to the WOSM at the World Scout Conference in Greece in July, 2002, the result of ten years effort by Father Renzo Mancini, the Chief Scout of Ethiopia, commissioners and other members of the Ethiopia Scout Association, who worked to get the association recognized again at the world level. Soon after this most recent recognition by WOSM, with the support of the Africa Regional Office, the Ethiopia Scout Association organized a number of training courses, and conducted recruitment drives and public relation activities.

Presently there are 67,250 Scouts (as of 2014), compared to 9,829 in 1972.

== Program and ideals ==
- Tadagi Scouts (Cub Scouts) age 7 to 11/12
- Medebegha Scouts (Junior Scouts) age 11/12 to 15/17
- Wotat Scouts (Venture Scouts) age 15/17 to 18/19
- Awaki Scouts (Rover Scouts) age 18/19 to 25

When a Rover Scout leaves the crew after completing his/her 25th birthday, he/she can train to be a Scout leader and takes the title Golmassa.

The Scout Motto is ዝግጁ, pronounced [zəɡədʒu], and means Ready in Amharic.

== Emblems ==
The membership badge of the Ethiopia Scout Association features the lion of Judah from the earlier flag of Ethiopia.

== International Scouting units in Ethiopia ==
In addition, there are American Boy Scouts in Addis Ababa, linked to the Direct Service branch of the Boy Scouts of America, which supports units around the world.

== See also ==
- Ethiopia Girl Scout Association
