= Scouting and Guiding in Liberia =

Scouting and Guiding associations in Liberia

The Scout and Guide movement in Liberia is served by two organisations (one for boys and one for girls)

- Liberian Girl Guides Association, member of the World Association of Girl Guides and Girl Scouts
- Boy Scouts of Liberia, member of the World Organization of the Scout Movement
