= Kinuthia Murugu =

Kenyan politician (d. 2009)

Kinuthia Murugu (died July 9, 2009, in Nairobi) was Permanent Secretary of Youth and Sports affairs in Kenya.

== Early life and navy career ==
As a youth, Murugu participated in Scouting activities while at Starehe Boys Centre and School. Later he studied at University of Nairobi and graduated with bachelor's degree in commerce. After university he joined Kenya Navy, and was once a peacekeeper in Yugoslavia. He attained Major's rank and retired from the military in 1996.

== Senior career ==
After military career he worked as the East African regional General Manager of the shipping company Maersk Sealand. Murugu was the director of World Scout Bureau's Africa Regional Office in Nairobi from 2001 to 2006. In 2006 Murugu was appointed the Youth and Sports Permanent Secretary at the Kenyan Ministry of Youth Affairs and Sports. He subsequently resigned from his position at World Scout Bureau, and Rubina Marivonne Haroon of Seychelles became the new regional director. Murugu launched the National Youth Enterprise Fund and the Kazi Kwa Vijana initiatives aimed at reducing unemployment and crime among Kenyan youth.

== Personal life ==
Writing poems was one of his hobbies and he published a poetry collection titled Feelings? Just Feelings? in 2003. He was also the chairman of Old Starehean Society, the alumni organisation of the high school he attended. Murugu left a widow and four sons.

== Death ==
Murugu was carjacked on June 19, 2009, at 3 am in Kilimani estate of Nairobi and the carjackers shot him in the chest, injuring him seriously. The carjackers fled the scene. He died of the injuries on July 9, 2009, at Nairobi Hospital.

He is buried at his farm in Kiambaa, Kiambu County.
