= Scouting and Guiding in Tanzania =

Scouting and Guiding associations in Tanzania

The Scout and Guide movement in Tanzania is served by:

- The Tanzania Girl Guides Association, member of the World Association of Girl Guides and Girl Scouts
- Tanzania Scouts Association, member of the World Organization of the Scout Movement
