= Boy Scouts of Liberia =

National Scouting organization of Liberia

- Country: Liberia
- Founded: 1922
- Membership: 2,418
- Affiliation: World Organization of the Scout Movement

The Boy Scouts of Liberia, the national Scouting organization of Liberia, was founded in 1922, and became a member of the World Organization of the Scout Movement in 1965. The boys only Boy Scouts of Liberia had 2,418 members as of 2004.

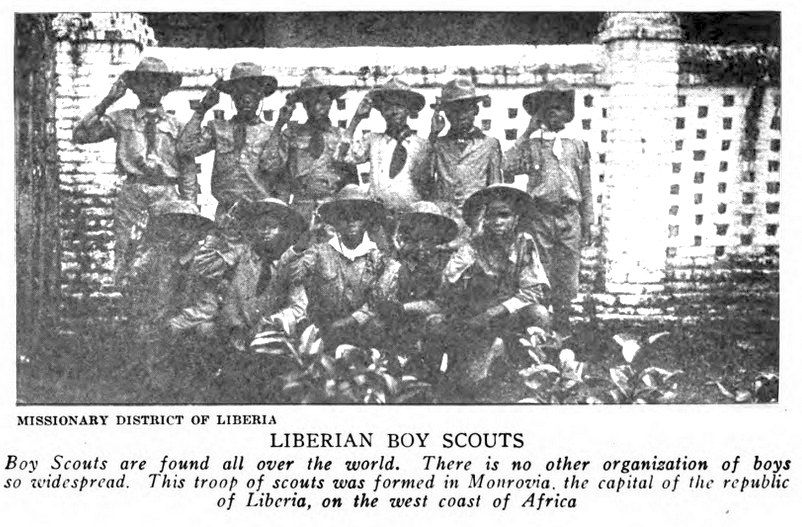

In 1975, Emmett Harmon (1913-?), a prominent Liberian, was awarded the Bronze Wolf, the only distinction of the World Organization of the Scout Movement, awarded by the World Scout Committee for exceptional services to world Scouting.

The program emphasis is on the dignity of labor and on guiding boys to self-discovery.

Liberia Annual Scout Week is celebrated in late May.

== See also ==
- Liberian Girl Guides Association
