= Statue of Robert Baden-Powell =

Statue of Robert Baden-Powell may refer to:

- Statue of Robert Baden-Powell, Gilwell Park, a granite statue of 1960 by Don Potter, formerly outside Baden-Powell House in London
- Statue of Robert Baden-Powell, Poole, a bronze statue of 2000 by David Annand
