= Eric Gill works at the Midland Hotel, Morecambe =

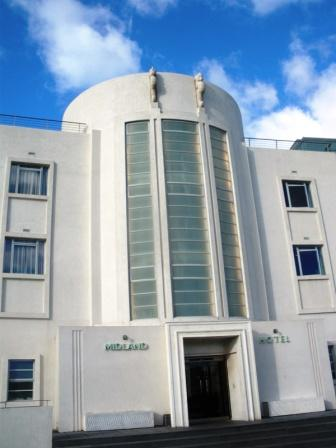
The main entrance to the Midland Hotel.

Eric Gill works at the Midland Hotel, Morecambe include a sculpture, reliefs and a medallion.

== Midland Hotel ==
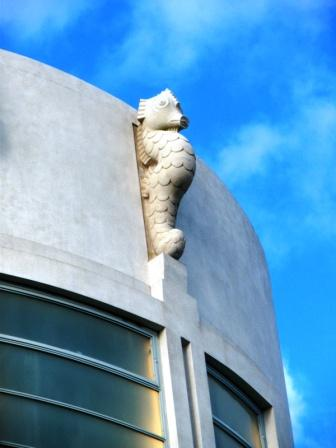
One of Eric Gill's two seahorses above the entrance to the Midland Hotel.

The Art Deco Midland Hotel was built in 1932–33 by the London Midland & Scottish Railway to the design of Oliver Hill and included works by Gill, Marion Dorn, and Eric Ravilious. Eric Gill produced several works for the hotel. These were two seahorses, modelled as Morecambe shrimps, for the outside entrance, a round plaster relief on the ceiling of the circular staircase inside the hotel, a decorative wall map of the north west of England, and a large stone relief of Odysseus being welcomed from the sea by Nausicaa.

The hotel had gradually become run down and neglected and eventually closed its doors to the public in 1993, but early in 2003 it was purchased by Urban Splash, a Manchester-based property company. Rebuilding work began in June 2005 and was completed three years later.

=== The two seahorses ===
The seahorses were carved in situ from Portland stone by Gill and his assistant, Donald Potter. When the hotel was renovated, it was found that the seahorses had been painted red and that they were much affected from exposure to the salty air. They were cleaned and repaired by craftsmen from Burnaby Stone Care Ltd.

=== The Neptune and Triton medallion ===
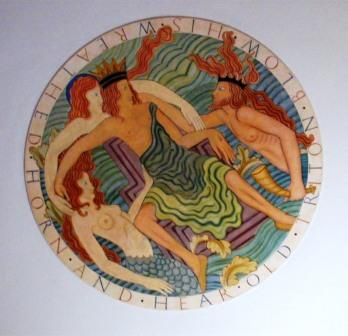
The Neptune and Triton medallion.

Designed and carved by Eric Gill and painted by Denis Tegetmeier (Gill’s son-in-law, who was a book illustrator). The medallion is on the ceiling at the top of the circular staircase in the hotel’s central tower. It is coloured in blue, blue green, yellow, and shades of red brown, and has the inscription "and hear old Triton blow his wreathed horn," words from a sonnet by William Wordsworth. (Note: The line quoted begins with or, not and, in the sonnet itself.) The medallion is 10 feet (3.05 m) in diameter. Neptune sits wearing a crown and Triton emerges from the sea, clasping his golden horn in his hands. Two mermaids complete the ensemble. During the hotel’s renovation, the medallion was repaired and the colours restored by Brian Cardy of Urban Splash. Gill had added the marks of stigmata on Neptune. This is thought to have come about due to the death of his father, whom he also tried to depict in the face of Triton.

=== "Odysseus welcomed from the sea by Nausicaa" ===
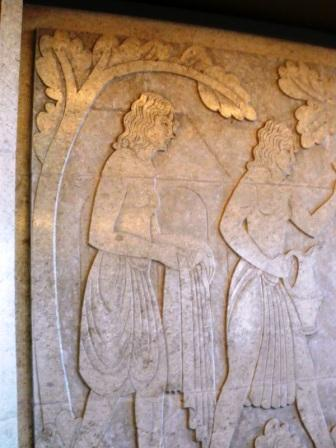
The Odysseus relief.

Positioned in the entrance lounge, and behind the reception desk, this 10 ft 5 in (3.175 m) × 16 ft (4.877 m) bas-relief was carved in situ from Portland stone by Eric Gill with Laurie Cribb carrying out the lettering.

The bas-relief has the inscription "There is good hope that thou mayest see thy friends", and "Homer/Ody" in smaller capitals. This is repeated in Greek with "Eric G" added. Odysseus is shown being welcomed from the sea by Nausicaa, who is attended by three female servants. One carries a bowl of fruit, the second a jug and goblet and the third a garment. The panel is based on three episodes of a story in Homer’s Odyssey.

=== Map of North West England ===
Again carved and designed by Eric Gill and painted by Denis Tegetmeier in oil paint on a polished, natural ivory coloured "Marplax" surface on a plaster ground and measuring 8 ft 6 in (2.59 m) x 17 ft 2 in (5.23 m). Completed in 1933, the map shows the northwest coastline from Whitehaven in the north to Birkenhead in the south, with many places being indicated by a feature associated with them. The London Midland & Scottish connection sees mention of the Midland Hotel itself, the Adelphi Hotel in Liverpool and the Royal Scot train. Among other features represented are Blackpool Tower, Furness Abbey, Lancaster Castle, the factory chimneys of Liverpool and Preston, Liverpool's two cathedrals, and the shipyard cranes of Barrow-in-Furness, as well as the coal mines of Whitehaven. The Liverpool Metropolitan Cathedral depicted was based on Edwin Lutyens' proposed building which was never finished: the present Roman Catholic cathedral stands where Lutyens' building would have stood. The Lake District is shown for the most part as an idyllic part of the region with, for example, hounds chasing a fox near Haweswater and leafy trees, blue lakes and rounded fells.

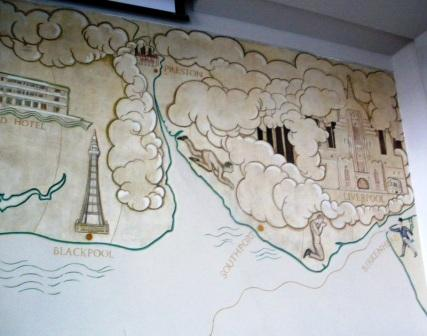
Map of the northwest of England (1).

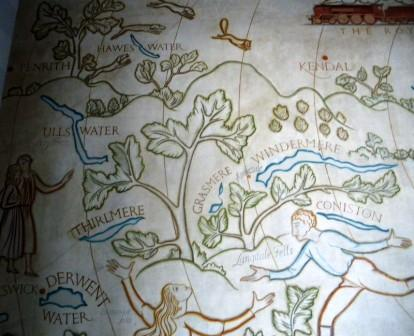
Map of the northwest of England (2).

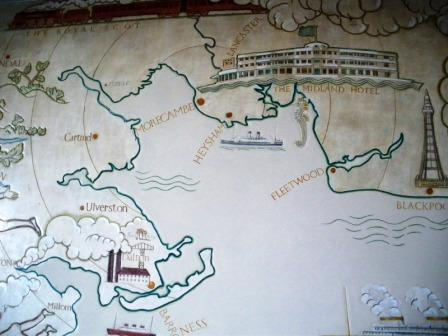
Map of the northwest of England (3).
