= Mozambique Guides =

- Country: Mozambique
- Affiliation: World Association of Girl Guides and Girl Scouts

Mozambique Guides are a prospective member of the World Association of Girl Guides and Girl Scouts. Delegates from Mozambique and prospect countries Ethiopia and Niger attended the 11th Africa Regional Conference from 26 to 31 July 2016 in Nairobi, Kenya.

== See also ==
- Liga dos Escuteiros de Moçambique
