= Tanzania Scouts Association =

National Scouting organization of Tanzania

- Country: Tanzania
- Founded: 1917
- Membership: 538,933.
- Affiliation: World Organization of the Scout Movement

The Tanzania Scouts Association (TSA) is the national Scouting organization of Tanzania. Scouting in Tanzania was founded in 1917, and became a member of the World Organization of the Scout Movement (WOSM) in 1963. The coeducational association has 538,933.members as of 2010.

== History ==
Scouting in present Tanzania started in Zanzibar in 1912

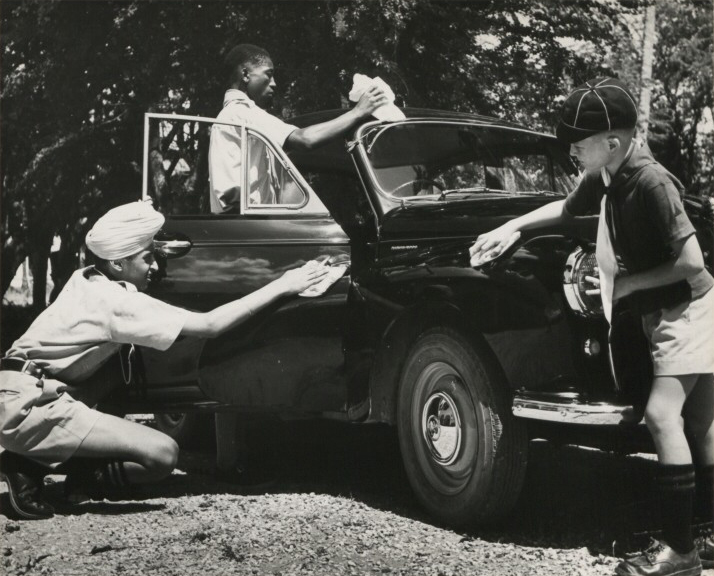
Dar es Salaam Boy Scouts cleaning cars

Scouting in present Tanzania started in Zanzibar in 1912 and in mainland Tanganyika in 1917. The TSA became a member of WOSM in 1963. Main aim of Tanzanian Scout association is to promote self-reliance among the young generations. In 1984, Tanzania hosted the 6th Africa Region Scout Conference.

Tanzanian president is the guardian of all scout organisations in the country. https://www.tanzaniascouts.or.tz/

== Program ==
Besides the traditional Scouting program, TSA is deeply involved in community development and has special programs for the prevention of AIDS.

The aim of Scouting in Tanzania is to develop the spirit of Ujamaa and self-reliance. Ujamaa is the concept of family ties within the social order. The program emphasizes learning by doing, community development, and nature conservation, particularly in rural areas.

Tanznaian president is the guardian of all scout organisations in the country.

The badge system is entirely adapted to the interests and needs of Tanzanian Scouts. The highest award is the President's Scout. Charles Ambrose, Farhad Shivji and Shafik Fazal from the Aga Khan Scouts - 1st Dar-es-Salaam Group, were among the first ten Scouts to be awarded the President's Scout badge by the President of the Republic, Dr. Ali Hassan Mwinyi in August 1992 at Magila Village in Tanga region, the site where Lord Baden-Powell, founder of the Scout movement, enrolled the first Tanganyika Scouts in 1938.

There is an active cooperation between Scouts and Girl Guides and with other youth organizations in celebrating national festivals, rendering services in villages and occasionally in courses, seminars and training camps. Scouts and Girl Guides often work together in community development projects, which are frequently supported by Scout organizations from other countries. One such project, with support from Norway, is establishing small rural industries and providing agricultural training.

== Religious factions ==
Tanzania Catholic Conference of Scouting was affiliated in 2008. It comprises Catholic scouts from 34 dioceses of Catholic Church in Tanzania. TCCS is a member of International Catholic Conference of Scouting.

The Islamic Scouts is a member of International Union of Muslim Scouts.

== Ideals ==
Scout Motto The Scout Motto is Uwe Tayari, Be Prepared in Swahili.

Scout Promise Kwa yamini yangu, naahidi kwamba nitajitahidi kadiri ya uwezo wangu, kutimiza wajibu wangu kwa Mungu na kwa Taifa langu, kuwasaidia watu siku zote, na kutimiza Kanuni za Skauti.

On my honour, I promise that I will do my best, to do my duty to God and to my Nation; to help other people at all times and to keep the Scout Law.

Scout Law

- Heshima ya Skauti ni kuaminiwa
- Skauti ni mzalendo kamili
- Skauti ni mtu wa kufaa na kusaidia wengine
- Skauti ni rafiki kwa wote na ndugu kwa kila Skauti
- Skauti ni mwenye adabu kamili
- Skauti ni mwenye huruma kwa viumbe
- Skauti ni mtiifu daima
- Skauti ni mchangamfu daima
- Skauti ni mwangalifu wa mali zake na za wengine pia
- Skauti ni safi katika mawazo, maneno, na matendo yake

+ Skauti si mjinga na mjinga sio skauti (ilisemwa na Baba wa Taifa Mwl. Nyerere)

- A Scout's honour is to be trusted
- A Scout is loyal to his nation
- A Scout is helpful to others
- A Scout is friendly to all and a brother to every Scout
- A Scout is courteous
- A Scout is kind to all creatures
- A Scout is obedient to his leaders
- A Scout is always cheerful
- A Scout is thrifty
- A Scout is clean in thought, word and deed

== Camping and training grounds ==
Bahati Camp in Morogoro, 190 kilometers from Dar-es-Salaam, is the national training and camping grounds. The camp has some basic training and camping facilities, situated on a site between two rivers on Mount Uluguru. The association has other district camps, which are not developed. The association is involved in various community development programs.

== Emblem ==
The national badge of the Tanzania Scouts Association features a Masai giraffe's head, a symbol in use since Tanzania was a colonial branch of British Scouting.

== See also ==
- The Tanzania Girl Guides Association
