= Kenya Girl Guides Association =

National Guiding organization of Kenya

- Kenya Girl Guides Association
- Country: Kenya
- Founded: 1920
- Membership: 350,000
- Affiliation: World Association of Girl Guides and Girl Scouts
- Website www.kgga.co.ke

Brownie	Guide

The Kenya Girl Guides Association (KGGA) is the national Guiding organization of Kenya. It serves 350,000 members as of 2022. Founded in 1920, the girls-only organization became a full member of the World Association of Girl Guides and Girl Scouts in 1975.

== History ==
The Association was first formed in Nairobi in 1920. It was initially only open to European girls, but by 1936, there were also groups for African and Asian girls. It became an associate member of the World Association of Girl Guides and Girl Scouts in 1963 and a full member in 1975.

First Lady Lucy Kibaki was a Girl Guide, and she provided financial support and assistance with fundraising around 2007, when she was the Patron. In 2021, the Association celebrated its 100th anniversary; First Lady Margaret Kenyatta, the Patron at the time, Margaret Kobia, and Anne Kananu gave speeches to members for the occasion. In 2023, First Lady Rachel Ruto was installed as the new Patron.

As of 2022, the Association has 350,000 members. It plans to reach a membership of one million.

== Activities ==
Each year on February 22, members of the guides and the Kenya Scouts Association gather in Nyeri, at the grave of Baden Powell, the founder of the Scouting movement, to celebrate Founders' Day at the grave. The Association, along with the Kenya Scouts Association, preserves the grave as well as Powell's final residence in Nyeri, which in 2025 was designated a World Guiding and Scouting Heritage Site.

The Association has focused on children with disabilities, both with integrating them in groups with non-disabled children and founding groups at schools for the deaf and blind, as well as sponsoring a transitional workshop for disabled women in Shanzu.

== See also ==
- The Kenya Scouts Association
- Elizabeth Nyaruai
