= Ethiopia Girl Scout Association =

Prospective member of the World Association of Girl Guides and Girl Scouts in Ethiopia

- Affiliation: World Association of Girl Guides and Girl Scouts

The Ethiopia Girl Scout Association is a prospective member of the World Association of Girl Guides and Girl Scouts. Delegates from Ethiopia and prospect countries Mozambique and Niger attended the 11th Africa Regional Conference from 26 to 31 July 2016 in Nairobi, Kenya.

Ethiopia is also a former member of the World Association of Girl Guides and Girl Scouts, under the Ye-Ītyōṗṗyā Iscaout Mahber Yeljagered Kifle Mekitle, last mentioned in 1984, now part of the Ethiopia Scout Association.

== See also ==
- Ethiopia Scout Association
