= Baden-Powell grave =

Grave in Nyeri, Nyeri County, Kenya

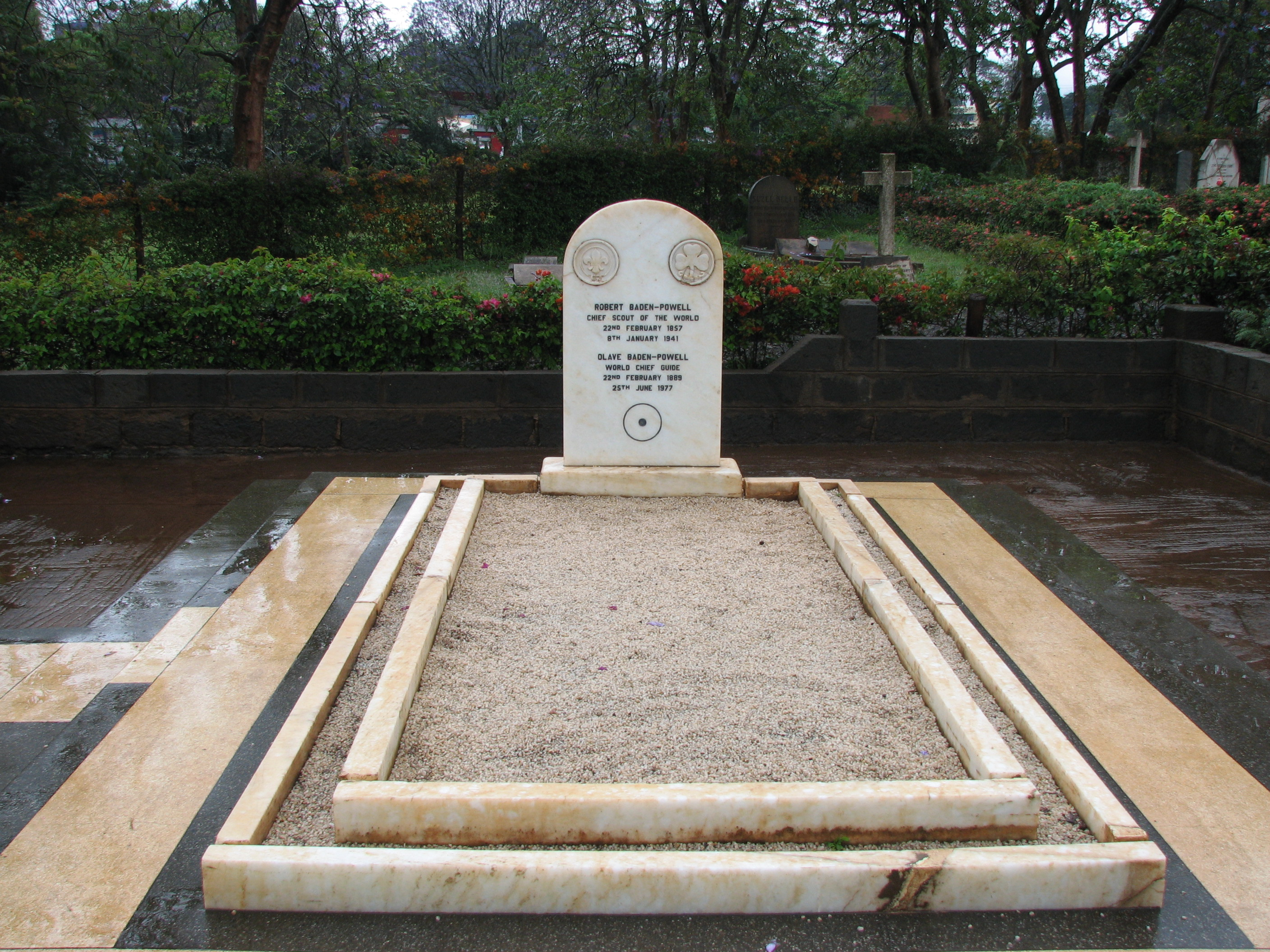
- Baden-Powell grave
- Interactive map of Baden-Powell grave

Details
- Established: 1941
- Location: Nyeri County
- Country: Kenya
- Coordinates: 0.418968°S 36.950117°E
- Owned by: St. Peter's Cemetery

The graves of Lieutenant-General The 1st Baron Baden-Powell and his wife, Olave, Baroness Baden-Powell, G.B.E., are in Nyeri, Nyeri County, Kenya, near Mount Kenya. Lord Baden-Powell died on 8 January 1941, and is buried in St. Peter's Cemetery in the Wajee Nature Park. When his wife Olave, Lady Baden-Powell, died, her ashes were sent to Kenya and interred beside her husband. Kenya has declared Baden-Powell's grave a national monument. Scouts consider the grave, "one of the most revered shrines and pilgrimage sites in the world."

== Background ==
Baden-Powell, who knew and liked Kenya, decided to start wintering in Nyeri at the Outspan Hotel of his friend, Eric Sherbrooke Walker. He chose Kenya as his last home because of the favorable climate and the political situation in Europe. Baden-Powell knew his health was failing and planned accordingly. He said, "I'd rather die in Africa, where my heart is, than anywhere". His will stipulated that he was to be buried in Nyeri, eschewing the tomb allotted to him in Westminster Abbey. He left final letters for Scouts and Scouters, and made plans for his burial.

His death was world-wide news. Speaking for Canada, Prime Minister MacKenzie King called it, "a loss which will be felt throughout the civilized world". He also said, "The Boy Scout movement will in itself be his enduring memorial". Baden-Powell was given a military funeral with a procession. He was buried in St. Peter's Cemetery in the Wajee Nature Park.

When Baden-Powell's wife, Olave, died on 25 June 1977, she was cremated and her ashes taken to Kenya for interment at the Baden-Powell gravesite. A memorial service was subsequently held for them in Westminster Abbey. The memorial stone is in the south aisle of the nave of Westminster Abbey, against the screen of St George’s chapel and was unveiled on 12 February 1981.

== Inscription ==
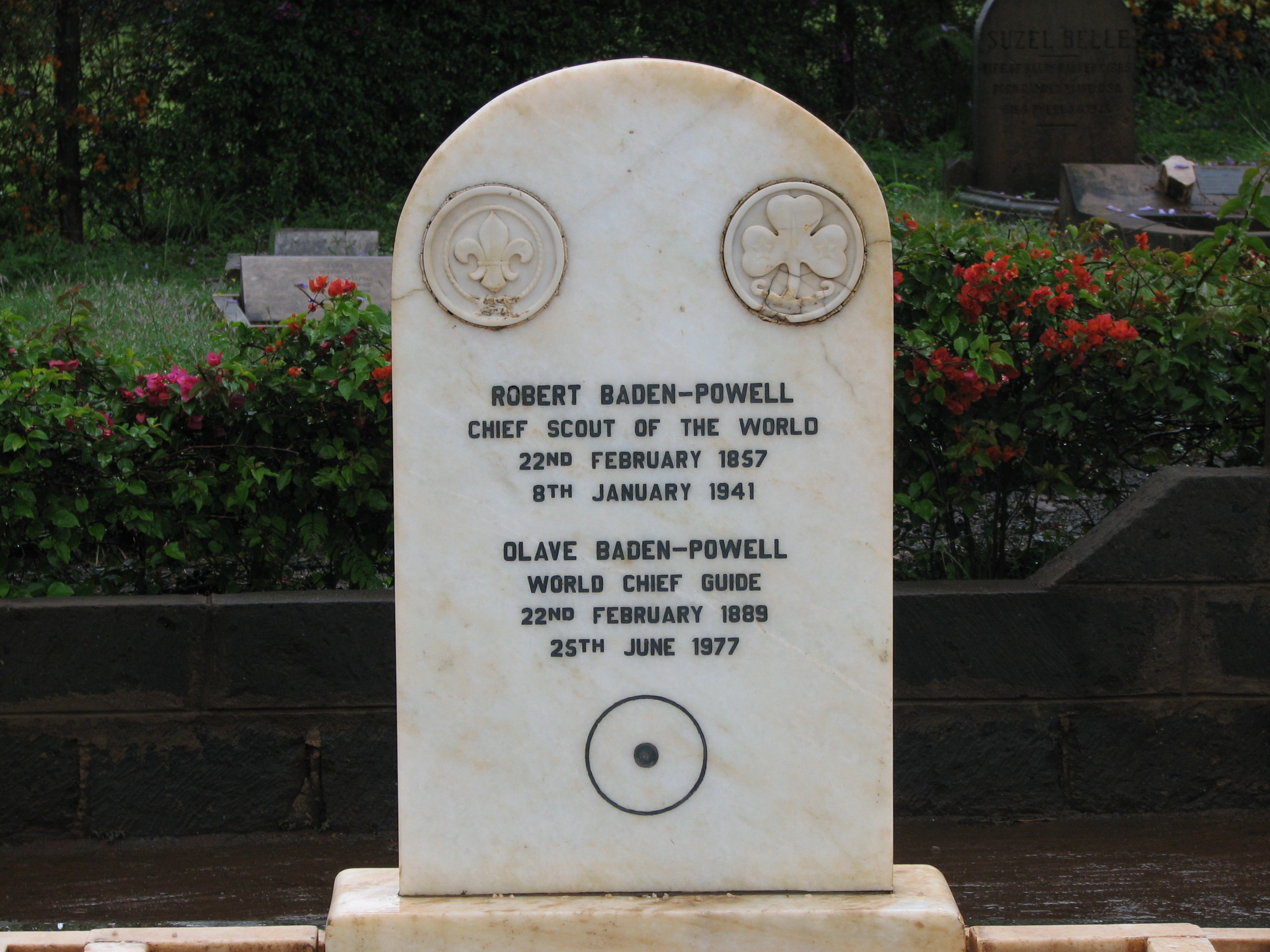
Close up

Robert Baden Powell

Chief Scout of the World
22nd February 1857
8th January 1941

Olave Baden Powell
World Chief Guide
22nd February 1889
25th June 1977

ʘ

His gravestone bears a circle with a dot in the centre, "ʘ", which is the trail sign for "Going home", or "I have gone home".

== Legacy ==
Kenya has declared Baden-Powell's grave a national monument. The nation's largest newspaper, the Daily Nation, has called the Scouting founder's final resting place "one of the most revered shrines and pilgrimage sites in the world", with as many as 50,000 people visiting the site each year. Each year on 22 February, members of the Kenya Scouts Association and Kenya Girl Guides Association celebrate Founders' Day at the grave. The British government employs staff to maintain the site.

== See also ==
- Scouting memorials
- Statue of Robert Baden-Powell, London
