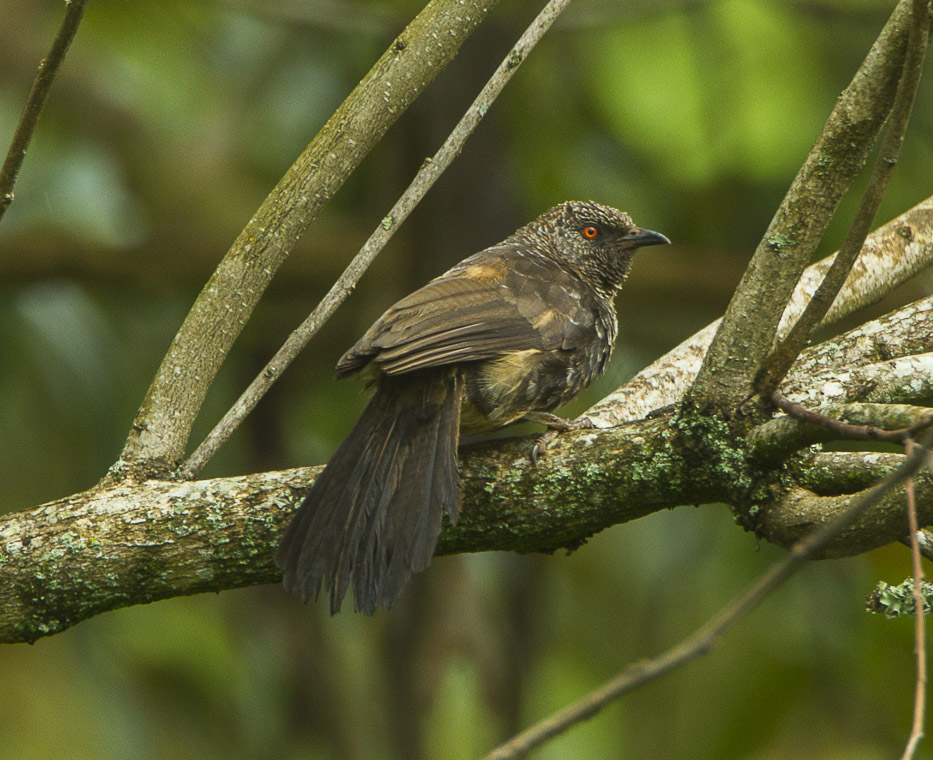

Conservation status
- Near Threatened (IUCN 3.1)

Scientific classification
- Kingdom: Animalia
- Phylum: Chordata
- Class: Aves
- Order: Passeriformes
- Family: Leiothrichidae
- Genus: Turdoides
- Species: T. hindei

Binomial name
- Turdoides hindei (Sharpe, 1900)

= Hinde's babbler =

Species of bird

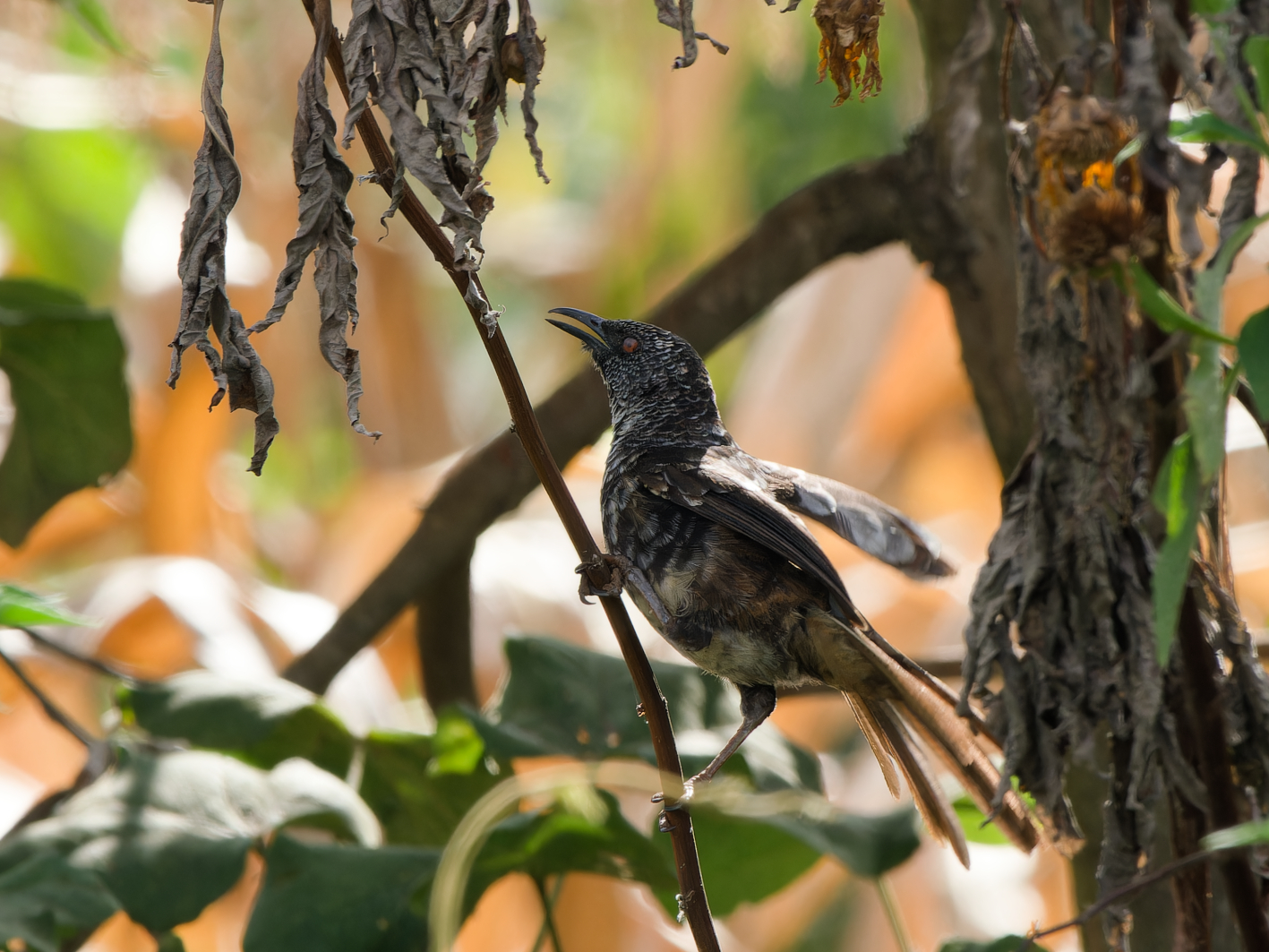
Hinde's Babbler

Hinde's babbler (Turdoides hindei), also known as Hinde's pied-babbler, is a species of bird in the family Leiothrichidae. It is endemic to Kenya. Its natural habitats are subtropical or tropical moist shrubland, arable land, and plantations. It is threatened by habitat loss.

== See also ==
- Wajee Nature Park
