= Wajee Nature Park =

Park in Nyeri County, Kenya

- Interactive map of Wajee Nature Park

Wajee Nature Park is a bird conservancy and nature park in Mukuruwe-ini, central Kenya. It is set between Mount Kenya and the Aberdare Range 160 km (99 mi) north of Nairobi. The park, which covers 10 ha (25 acres) of pristeen natural forest, was set aside for conservation by the Reverend James Gakunju Gathigi (locally known as Wa-G or Wajee). It is home to two rare species: the Hinde's babbler and the side-striped jackal.

== See also ==
- Baden-Powell grave
- Jeevanjee Gardens
