= Don Potter =

English sculptor, wood carver, potter and teacher

Donald Steele Potter
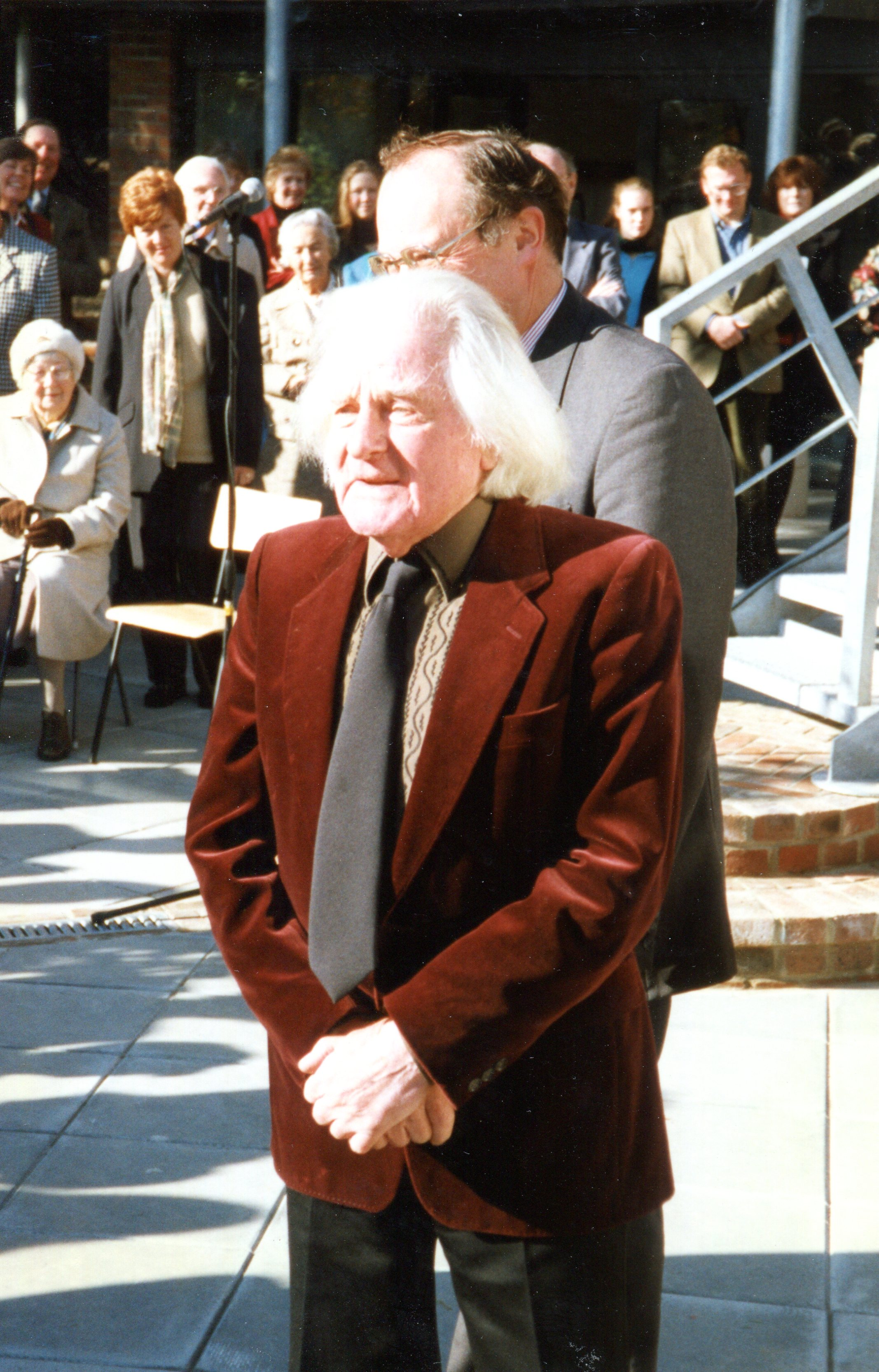
- Don Potter at the opening of the Don Potter Art School, Bryanston School, October 1997 (aged 95)
- Born: 21 April 1902; Newington, Swale, Kent, England
- Died: 7 June 2004 (aged 102)
- Education: Studied under Eric Gill
- Known for: Sculpture, pottery
- Notable work: Statue of Robert Baden-Powell, London (1960–61)
- Spouse: Mary Potter
- Patrons: Robert Baden-Powell, 1st Baron Baden-Powell; Bryanston School

Donald Steele Potter (21 April 1902 – 7 June 2004) was an English sculptor, wood carver, potter and teacher.

== Early life ==
Don Potter was born in Newington, near Sittingbourne, Kent, the son of a school teacher, and attended a private school. He joined the Wolf Cubs at the age of eight and became a keen participant in the scouting movement.

== Career ==
Potter developed as a woodcarver, producing totem poles, gates and gateways. By the time Potter reached the age of twenty, the head of the Scouts, Baden-Powell himself, realized he was an expert craftsman. Potter camped at Baden-Powell's house at Pax Hill near Bentley, Hampshire and undertook carving commissions for him. He used very old local fallen oaks, said to be 1,200 years old. For the 1929 World Jamboree, Potter designed totem poles for the British Dominions of Australia, Canada, India, South Africa and New Zealand.

As well as wood carving, Potter started to work in stone as well and met Jacob Epstein (who had studied with Auguste Rodin in Paris). In 1931, he approached Eric Gill and asked to study under him. Gill was an engraver, designer of typefaces and sculptor, with carvings in Westminster Cathedral. Initially, Potter was on a six-month trial, but he remained as Gill's pupil for six years. He worked with Gill on sculptures at the Midland Hotel, Morecambe. While with Gill, he undertook wood carving, including the panels for the doors for the Rare Books Room of 1934 in the Radcliffe Science Library (University of Oxford), the crucifixion for the altar of the St Peter the Apostle church (Gorleston-on-Sea, Norfolk), and a crucifix in the woods at Pigotts where Gill was based near High Wycombe.

In addition to being a sculptor, Potter spent his later career as a teacher at Bryanston School in Dorset (1940–1984), responsible for both sculpture and pottery. Prior to taking up this appointment he had never done any pottery and took lessons from Amy Krauss at Corfe Castle and then Winchcombe Pottery where Ray Finch and Michael Cardew were working. During World War II, Sir Terence Conran was inspired by him as one of his pupils. Potter continued to undertake commissions during his time as a teacher, including some for the School. For instance, examples of stone carvings undertaken by him in 1991 can be seen at a local church in the village of Durweston.

The porch of Our Lady of Grace and St Teresa of Avila RC Church in Chingford, North East London, has oak panels depicting animals and fish that Potter carved in 1956.

A major work by Potter is the granite statue of Robert Baden-Powell (1960–61) to stand in front of the then new Baden-Powell House in Queen's Gate, South Kensington, London. However, that property has now been sold, and the statue has been moved to the Scout HQ at Gilwell Park, Chingford. Another of his works is the Commemorative Stone on Brownsea Island, unveiled by B-P's daughter Betty on 1 August 1967.

The Don Potter Art School at Bryanston School, opened in October 1997 in his presence, is named after him.

== Gallery ==
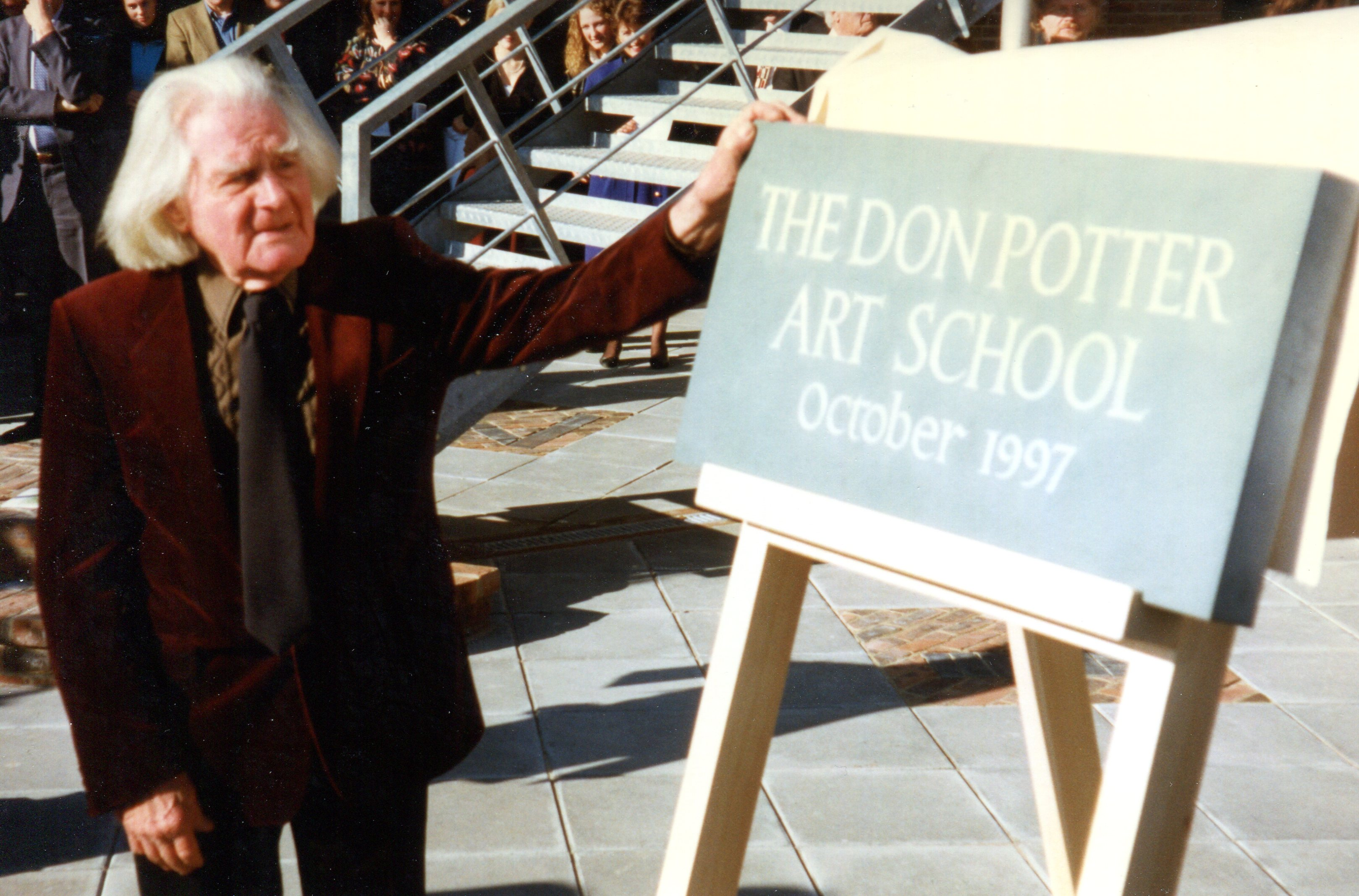
Don Potter with the carved sign at the opening of the Don Potter Art School, Bryanston School, October 1997

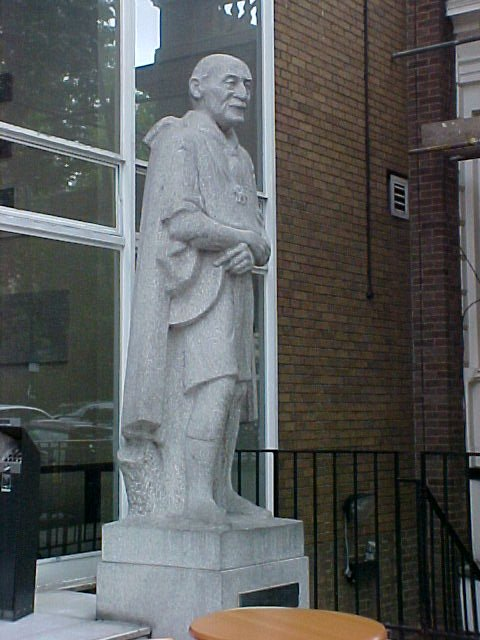
Statue of Robert Baden-Powell (1960–61), Baden-Powell House, Queen's Gate, London

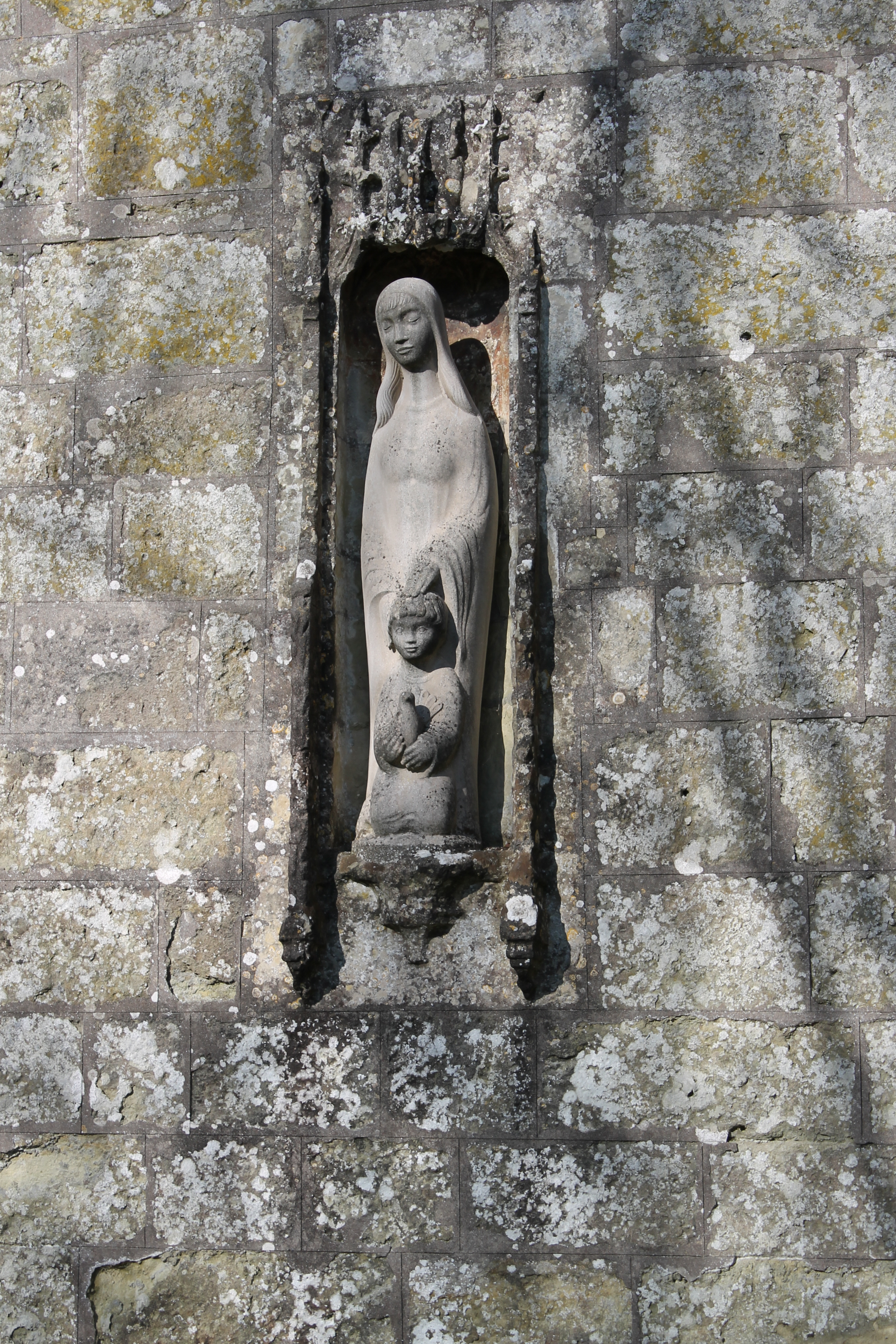
Carving on the south face of the tower of St Nicholas church in Durweston, Dorset, by Don Potter (1991)
