= Baden-Powell House =

Conference centre in South Kensington, London

Coordinates: 51.4955°N 0.1795°W

Queen's Gate House
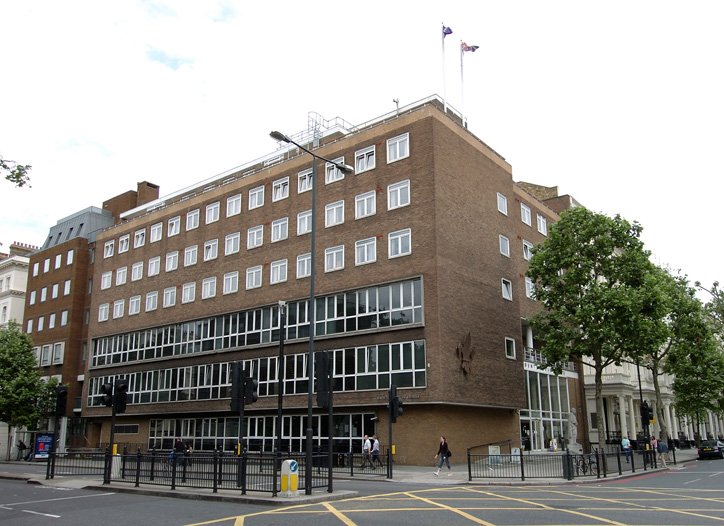
- Interactive map of the Queen's Gate House area
- Former names: Baden-Powell House

General information
- Architectural style: Modern architecture
- Location: 65 Queen's Gate, Kensington; London, SW7, United Kingdom
- Completed: 12 July 1961; 65 years ago
- Cost: £400,000
- Client: The Scout Association

Design and construction
- Architect: Ralph Tubbs
- Structural engineer: Harry Neal Ltd.

Website
- www.mpw.ac.uk/queens-gate-house

Queen's Gate House, still commonly known by its previous name of Baden-Powell House, is a conference centre in South Kensington, London. It was built as a tribute to Lord Baden-Powell, the founder of Scouting, and has served as the headquarters for The Scout Association, as a hostel providing modern and affordable lodging for Scouts, Guides, their families and the general public staying in London and as a conference and event venue.

The building committee, chaired by Sir Harold Gillett, Lord Mayor of London, purchased the site in 1956, and assigned Ralph Tubbs to design the house in the modern architectural style. The foundation stone was laid in 1959 by World Chief Guide Olave, Lady Baden-Powell, and it was opened in 1961 by Queen Elizabeth II. The largest part of the £400,000 cost was provided by the Scout Movement itself and the building previously included a number of tributes to the founder including hosting a small exhibition about Scouting, and a granite statue of Baden-Powell by Don Potter located outside the building.

Following the impact of the COVID-19 pandemic and a decline in numbers of Scouts using the facility, the Scout Association sold the building to Mander Portman Woodward who run it as an events and conference venue and are converting the hostel rooms into boarding accommodation for students.

== History ==
=== Construction ===
From an address by Elizabeth II
Baden-Powell himself has gone, but his Movement remains and grows—a memorial more enduring than stone or steel. It is fitting, however, that here in England, where he started it, there should be a house bearing his name and serving the needs of the Movement, expressing our gratitude in a practical way.

Acting on a 1942 initiative by Chief Scout Lord Somers, a formal Baden-Powell House Committee was established by The Scout Association in 1953 under the direction of Sir Harold Gillett, later Lord Mayor of London. The committee's directive was to build a hostel to provide Scouts a place to stay at reasonable cost while visiting London. For this purpose, in 1956 the committee purchased a bombed-out property at the intersection of Cromwell Road and Queen's Gate at a cost of £39,000.

The Scout Movement raised the major part of the funding of £400,000 for building and furnishing the building between 1957 and 1959. Scouts throughout the country collected 'ship' halfpennies, and this raised the bulk of the money for the building. Money was also raised through public appeals supported by publication in Scout Movement magazines, a collection of donations in 15,000 brick-shaped boxes, and 5,000 appeal letters signed personally by then Chief Scout Lord Rowallan. Scouts representing every county were present at the opening.

In a celebration on 17 October 1959 the foundation stone was laid by the World Chief Guide (Olave Baden-Powell), in the presence of Lord Mayor Sir Harold Gillett, the new Chief Scout Sir Charles Maclean, and 400 other guests. A casket was buried under the foundation stone which held 1959 Scout mementoes, stamps, coins, photographs, etc., and a programme of the ceremony.

=== Use by the Scout Association ===
With 142 Queen's Scouts as Guard of Honour, and live broadcast by the BBC (commentator Richard Dimbleby), Baden-Powell House was opened on 12 July 1961 by Queen Elizabeth II. Afterwards, she toured the house with the Chief Scout and the president of The Scout Association, her uncle Prince Henry, Duke of Gloucester. A black marble panel with gold lettering was put on the balcony in the hall to commemorate the event.

From 1974 to 2001, Baden-Powell House was the headquarters of The Scout Association, replacing their previous location in Buckingham Palace Road for which a dedicated office extension to the house was opened by the Queen in November 1976. As the association had expanded, the staff were split between Baden-Powell House and Gilwell Park in the historic White House. In 1987 elements of the building were adapted as an events and conference space, expanding the appeal of the building more broadly. In 1993, the Scout Association took the decision to relocate their headquarters and all of their staff to a new purpose-built building at Gilwell Park housing all the association's staff. The decision was in part led by the deteriorating condition of the historic White House at Gilwell Park with the three phase project concluding in April 2001 when the headquarters formally moved to Gilwell House. As part of this development, the adjoining office block was sold to raise funds for the new construction. As the owner of Baden-Powell House, The Scout Association received at this time a net income out of the revenues of approximately £1.5 million.

Thirty-five years after its opening, Baden-Powell House was refurbished in a six-month £2 million programme, providing all modern amenities such as private facilities for all rooms, double glazing, and air conditioning, as well as enhancing conference facilities for large and small events. Upon completion of the programme, the house was opened by the president of The Scout Association, Prince Edward, Duke of Kent on 5 June 1997. A museum to the life of B.P., "The Baden-Powell Story", was housed at the site.

Since its inception, Baden-Powell House provided a hostel for people visiting London, and since 2001 this became the main focus of the building. In the period 2004–2006 the hostel participated in the Youth Hostel Association, after which the Scout Association entered into an agreement with German company Meininger Hotels with Scout members from the UK and abroad being able to stay at a reduced rate. It remained owned by the Scout Association, and advertised alongside the Gilwell Park Conference Centre and the Scout Activity Centres. At its peak, it saw on average 30,000 people spending the night and 100,000 meals served in the restaurant.

=== Use by Mander Portman Woodward ===
In November 2020 it was announced that the Scout Association would sell the building as a result of the impact of the 2020 Covid crisis on the Scout Association's revenues. In March 2021, the property was valued at £46 million. The sale was completed in August 2021 to an independent school Mander Portman Woodward whose London campus is located in converted town houses a short distance away in Queen's Gate. They plan to retain the events and conference facilities as well as adding other bespoke teaching areas, including an art studio, and converting the hostel rooms into boarding accommodation for international students and students over the age of 14 years from September 2022.

== Architecture ==
=== Architectural inspiration ===
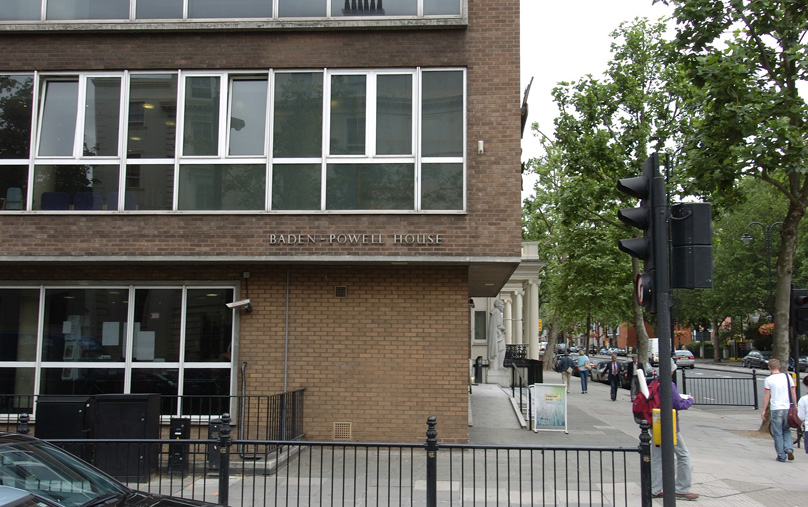
Baden-Powell House, side view

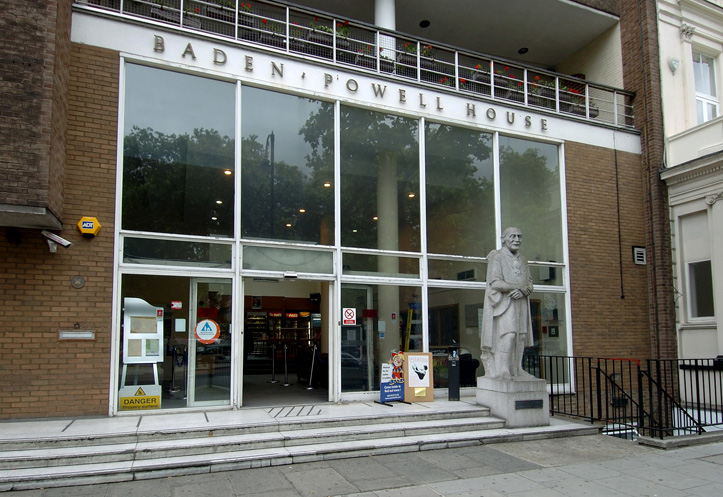
Baden-Powell House, front view

The house was designed by the architect Ralph Tubbs in 1956, whose works included the Dome of Discovery, the highlight of the 1951 Festival of Britain. Tubbs' floor plans and a model of his design were displayed during a fundraising campaign and exhibition on 21 February 1957 in the Egyptian Hall of the Mansion House.

The six storied building is designed in the modern architectural style, as pioneered by the Swiss architect Le Corbusier from the late 1920s onwards, and predominating in the 1950s. At Baden-Powell House, Tubbs made the first floor overhang the ground floor, a Le Corbusier architectural design choice to free the building from the ground, such as seen in his Pavillon Suisse at the Cité Internationale Universitaire in Paris.

Additionally, Le Corbusier's Sainte Marie de La Tourette priory in Lyon shows two floors of monk's cells with small windows, cantilevered over the more open floors below, another design choice used by Tubbs in the facade of Baden-Powell House. While Tubbs created Baden-Powell House in the modern architectural style of Le Corbusier, he used more architectural restraint in his own design choices. For example, he made the main visible building component brick rather than concrete. This heavier evolution of Le Corbusier's style was popular in England throughout the post-war years until replaced by the Brutalist style in the later 1960s.

Baden-Powell House was built to Tubbs' design by Harry Neal Ltd, for which they received the 1961 Gold Medal of the Worshipful Company of Tylers and Bricklayers. At the opening, the house received the building design award for 'The building of most merit in London.'

=== Layout ===
The hostel and conference centre is entered from Queen's Gate through a wide glazed atrium which serves as a large foyer containing the cafe. From the atrium the large hall is reached which can serve as an auditorium with seating for up to 300 people. The first floor has a restaurant seating 100 guests; the second floor has meeting rooms and conference facilities for groups up to 80 delegates per room. The upper floors contain 180 hostel bedrooms.

== Baden-Powell collection ==
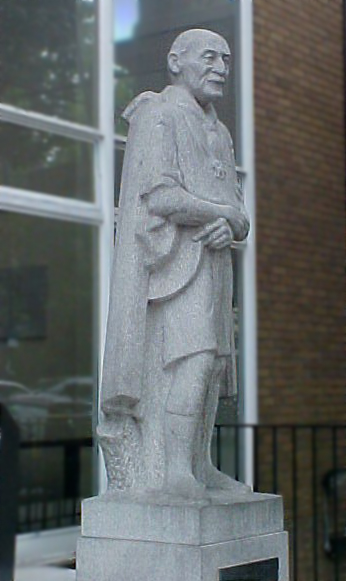
Statue of Baden-Powell by Don Potter

For a number of years a notable collection of Baden-Powell memorabilia was on display in the building, in an exhibition titled The Story of B-P. This included many drawings and letters by Baden-Powell himself, such as the original of his "Last message to Scouts", "Laws for me when I am old" and several first editions of his books. The exhibition also included David Jagger's original portrait of Baden-Powell, presented to its subject on 29 August 1929 at the "Coming of Age" 3rd World Scout Jamboree. This painting, a personal favourite of Baden-Powell's, is often used in publications throughout the Scouting movement. The Baden-Powell memorabilia was later moved to Gilwell Park, the headquarters for Scouting in the United Kingdom, and was replaced with a number of smaller displays on public view in the reception area showing some traditional Scouting skills.

A nearly three metre–high statue of Baden-Powell, sculpted by his friend Don Potter, was unveiled on 12 July 1961 by the Duke of Gloucester as part of the official opening of Baden-Powell House. It was located outside the main entrance for the duration the Scout Association's ownership of the building, and was moved in August 2021 to Gilwell Park.

== See also ==
- Baden-Powell International House, 25-story hotel of The Scout Association of Hong Kong in Kowloon, Hong Kong
- Ellsworth Augustus Scout House, the Boy Scouts of America hostel, in Mendham, New Jersey, US
- Jamboree on the Air, call sign for Baden-Powell House is GB3BPH
- Kandersteg International Scout Centre
- Scout Adventures (The Scout Association)
