= Scouting and Guiding in Thailand =

The Scout and Guide movement in Thailand is served by two organisations:

- The Girl Guides Association of Thailand, member of the World Association of Girl Guides and Girl Scouts
- The National Scout Organization of Thailand, member of the World Organization of the Scout Movement

== International Scouting units in Thailand ==
There are two organizations focused on serving children of American military families living in Thailand and elsewhere in eastern Asia and the western Pacific: USA Girl Scouts Overseas, and Boy Scouts of America, serviced by the Garuda District of the Far East Council. These councils serve BSA and GSUSA units composed of children of diplomatic, business and military personnel, and international units run under their auspices.
