= Statue of Robert Baden-Powell, Gilwell Park =

Statue formerly in London

Statue of Robert Baden-Powell
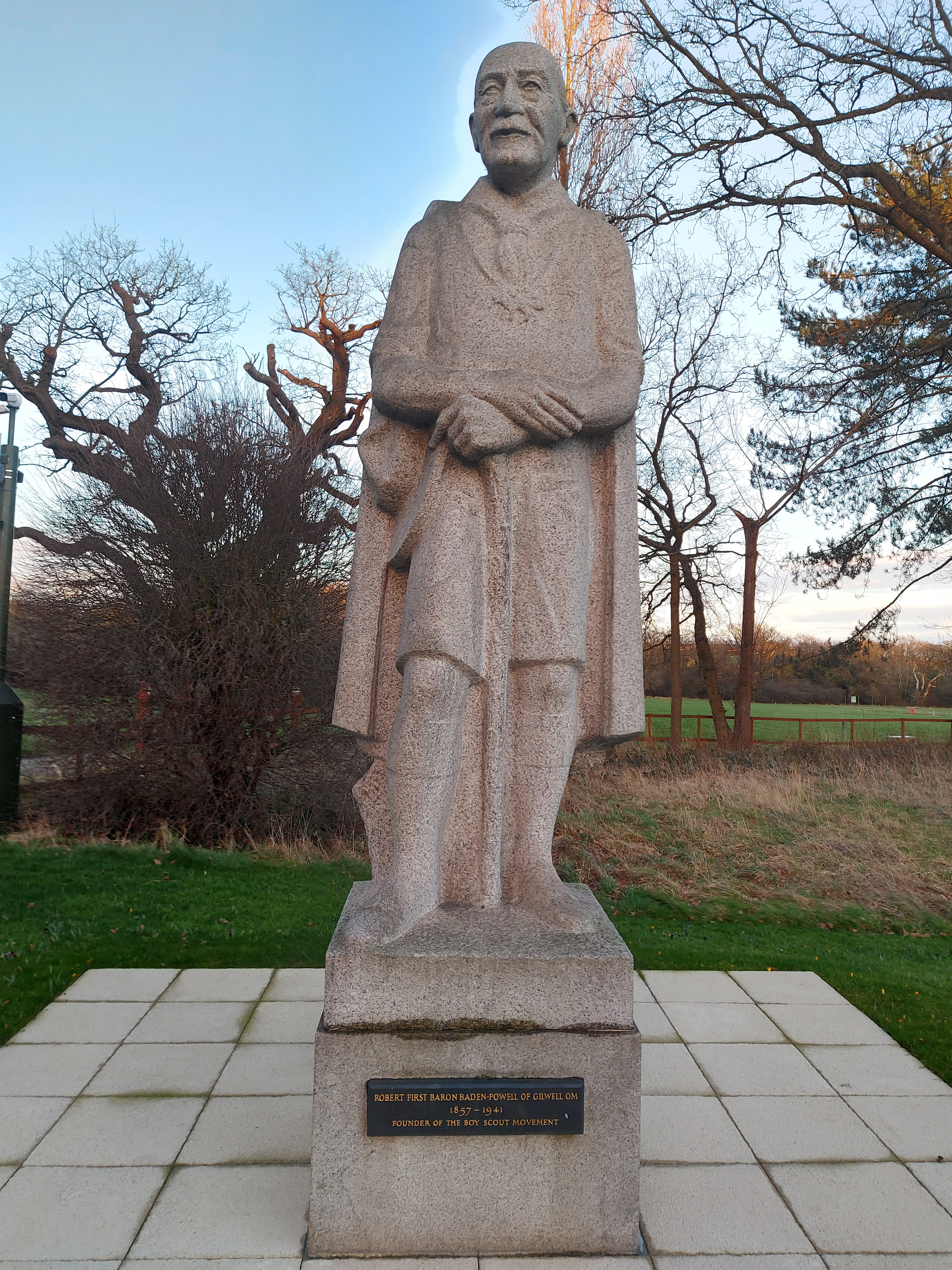
- The statue at Gilwell Park
- Artist: Don Potter
- Year: 1960
- Completion date: 1961
- Medium: Granite
- Subject: Robert Baden-Powell, 1st Baron Baden-Powell
- Dimensions: 3 m (9.8 ft)
- Location: Gilwell Park, Essex, England, United Kingdom
- Owner: The Scout Association

A statue of Robert Baden-Powell, 1st Baron Baden-Powell, the founder of Scouting, formerly stood in front of Baden-Powell House in London and is now at Gilwell Park in Essex, near Epping Forest. Carved from granite by the sculptor Don Potter, it was installed and unveiled in 1961. It remained at Baden-Powell House until August 2021.

== Background ==
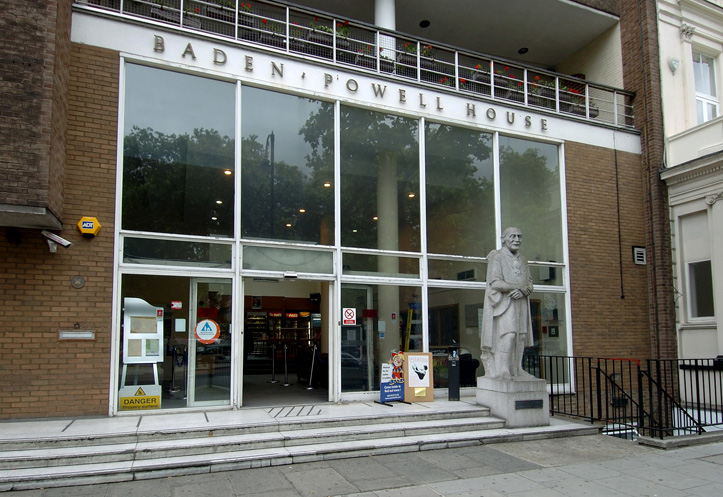
The statue at its previous site outside Baden-Powell House, London

The statue is made from Cornish granite, which is rare because granite is a difficult material to work with. Potter had been involved in the Scouting movement and Baden-Powell had been a patron of his, commissioning carved totem poles from him. The statue is a 3 metres (9.8 ft) tall granite sculpture depicting an elderly Baden-Powell, dressed in his Scouting uniform and wearing a cape. Baden-Powell's arms are crossed in front of his waist. His left hand rests upon a walking stick or tree branch; his right hand rests upon his left wrist. His campaign hat is tucked behind his right elbow, the brim held by the thumb and forefinger of his left hand. Below his neckerchief is his Bronze Wolf medal.

The statue was unveiled on 12 July 1961 by Prince Henry, Duke of Gloucester, who was the President of the Scouts. The inscription on the plaque at the sculpture's base reads:

ROBERT FIRST BARON BADEN-POWELL OF GILWELL OM
1857 – 1941
FOUNDER OF THE BOY SCOUT MOVEMENT

A preparatory model for the sculpture is in the collection of the Scouts Heritage Service, also in Gilwell Park.

== See also ==
- Scouting memorials
- Baden-Powell grave
