= Scouting and Guiding in the Maldives =

The Scout and Guide movement in the Maldives is served by two organisations:

- Maldives Girl Guide Association, member of the World Association of Girl Guides and Girl Scouts
- The Scout Association of Maldives, member of the World Organization of the Scout Movement
