= Scouting and Guiding in Brunei =

Scouting and Guiding Organizations in Brunei

The Scout and Guide movement in Brunei is served by two organisations

- Girl Guides Association of Brunei Darussalam, member of the World Association of Girl Guides and Girl Scouts
- Persekutuan Pengakap Negara Brunei Darussalam, member of the World Organization of the Scout Movement.
