= Liberian Girl Guides Association =

National Guiding organization of Liberia

Liberia Girl Guides Association
- Liberia Girl Guides Association
- Headquarters: C. Adeline King Building
- Location: Duport Road, Paynesville
- Country: Liberia
- Founded: 1926
- Founder: Former First Lady C. Adeline King
- Membership: 6,425
- Chief Commissioner: Deroe E. A. Weeks
- Affiliation: World Association of Girl Guides and Girl Scouts
- Website http://www.libgirlguides.org/

The Liberia Girl Guides Association is the national Guiding organization of Liberia. It serves 9,000 members (as of 2022). Founded in 1926, the girls-only organization became a full member of the World Association of Girl Guides and Girl Scouts in 1928 and again in 1966 after a hiatus.

The Girl Guide emblem incorporates elements of the seal of Liberia.

== See also ==
- Boy Scouts of Liberia
