= The Tanzania Girl Guides Association =

National Guiding organization of Tanzania

- Country: Tanzania
- Founded: 1928
- Membership: 17,233
- Affiliation: World Association of Girl Guides and Girl Scouts

The Tanzania Girl Guides Association is the national Guiding organization of Tanzania. It serves 17,233 members (as of 2003). The first Guide Company was founded in Tanganyika in 1928, and the girls-only organization became a full member of the World Association of Girl Guides and Girl Scouts in 1963.

== See also ==
- Tanzania Scouts Association
