= Scouting and Guiding in Azerbaijan =

Scouting and Guiding Organizations in Azerbaijan

The Scout and Guide movement in Azerbaijan is served by the Association of Scouts of Azerbaijan, member of the World Organization of the Scout Movement and the World Association of Girl Guides and Girl Scouts. The Association of Azerbaijan Girl Guides, formerly "working towards WAGGGS membership, is no longer active.

== International Scouting units in Azerbaijan ==
In addition, there are Girl Scouts of the USA Overseas in Baku, serviced by way of USAGSO headquarters in New York City; as well as Cub Scout Pack 777 in Baku, linked to the Direct Service branch of the Boy Scouts of America, which supports units around the world.
