= Emmett Harmon =

- Known for: Member of the World Scout Committee

Hon. Emmett Harmon of Liberia served as a member of the World Scout Committee. In 1975, Harmon was awarded the 99th Bronze Wolf, the only distinction of the World Organization of the Scout Movement, awarded by the World Scout Committee for exceptional services to world Scouting, at the 25th World Scout Conference.
