= Rubina Marivonne Haroon =

- Occupation: Politician

Ms. Rubina Marivonne Haroon (born 1961) of the Seychelles was appointed by Dr. Eduardo Missoni of the World Organization of the Scout Movement as the new Regional Director for the World Scout Bureau Africa Regional Office in July 2006, in agreement with the Africa Regional Scout Committee. Rubina left WOSM in 2008 to assume the post of Regional Representative for Eastern and Southern Africa for WWF International. Rubina now works for the United Nations Office for Project Support, East Africa Hub, based in Nairobi.

Haroon holds a BA in International Relations, and has worked in the Horn of Africa since 1992. She was previously the Senior Assistant Resident Representative and Head of the Strategic Outreach Unit of the UNDP Kenya country office from 2004 to 2006. Prior to joining UNDP in Kenya, Haroon worked in Somalia from 1992 to 2004 with both the United Nations in senior positions, and as a technical advisor the European Commission Humanitarian Office (ECHO).
