= Liga dos Escuteiros de Moçambique =

National Scouting organization of Mozambique

- League of Scouts of Mozambique
- Country: Mozambique
- Founded: 1994
- Membership: 8000 (2020)
- Chief Scout: Hermínio Muiambo
- Affiliation: World Organization of the Scout Movement
- Website http://sites.google.com/site/scoutmoz/Home/

The Liga dos Escuteiros de Moçambique (LEMO), the national Scouting organization of Mozambique, was founded in 1994, and became a member of the World Organization of the Scout Movement in 1999. The coeducational Liga dos Escuteiros de Moçambique has 31,108 members as of 2017, with most members located in the major cities. The National Chief Scout Leonardo Adamowicz is from Poland, hence the Liga dos Escuteiros de Moçambique uniform is similar to the Polish uniform, adopted to climate differences. The similarities between the Mozambican Scout emblem and the Polish Scout lilijka may readily be noted, as well. The "D H P" in the emblem stands for Deus Honra Pátria, God Honor Country.

Mozambique hosted the 5th African Jamboree in 2006, and was expected to host the cancelled World Scout Moot in 2008. The association is a member of the Comunidade do Escutismo Lusófono (Community of Lusophone Scouting).

== Program ==
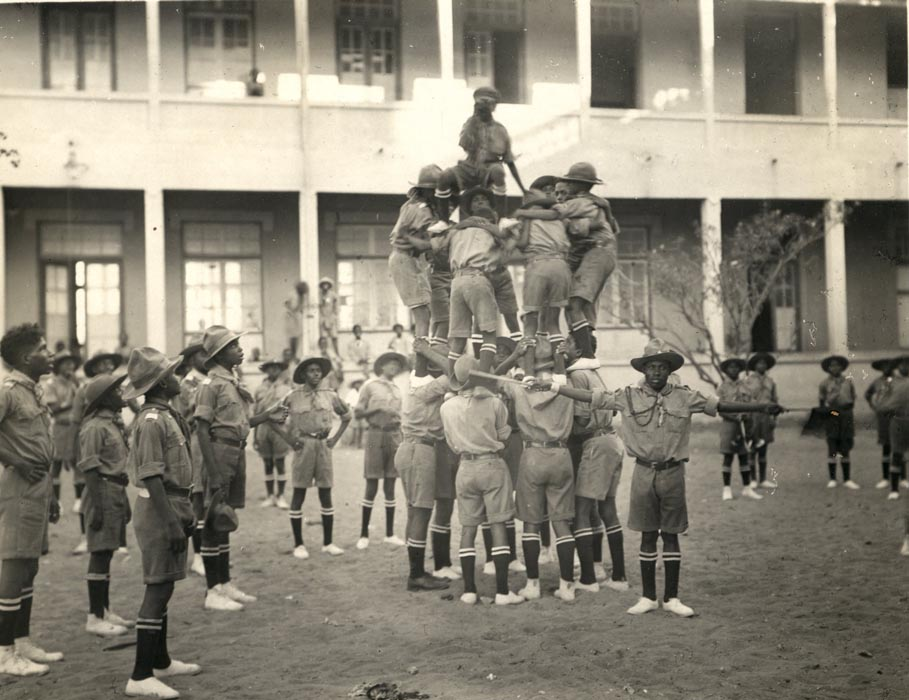
Scout games in Beira, 1930

The association is divided in four sections corresponding to age:

- Lobitos (Cub Scouts) - ages 7 to 11
- Exploradores juniores (Junior Explorers, i.e. Boy Scouts) - ages 12 to 15
- Exploradores séniores (Senior Explorers, i.e. Explorer Scouts — ages 16 to 18
- Caminheiros (Rover Scouts) - ages 19 to 21

== Ideals ==
Scout Motto

The Scout Motto is Sempre Pronto, Be Prepared, in Portuguese.

Scout Promise

Tenho toda a vontade de oferecer a minha Pátria
Tudo de melhor que eu tenho e sei;
Toda minha força e vida;
Ajudar aos necessitados;
Lutar pela unidade nacional;
Cumprir a Lei do Escuteiro;
Ser disciplinado e útil na sociedade;
Deus me ajude;Sempre Pronto!

Scout Law

- Escuteiro é verdadeiro e sua Palavra é sagrada.
- O Escuta é leal.
- O Escuta é prestavel e pratica diariamente uma boa acção.
- O Escuta é amigo de todos e irmão de todos os outros escutas.
- O Escuta é cortes.
- O Escuta protege as plantas e os animais.
- O Escuta é obediente.
- O Escuta é alegre e sorri perante as dificuldades.
- O Escuta é sóbrio, económico e respeitador do bem alheio.
- O Escuta é puro nos pensamentos, nas palavras e nas acções.

== See also ==
- Mozambique Guides
