= Elizabeth Nyaruai =

Kenyan police officer

- Born: 1927 (age 98–99)
- Occupation: Police officer

Elizabeth Nyaruai (born appr. 1927) was Kenya's first female police officer. Nyaruai lives alone in a mud hut on an 89 acre piece of land given to her in the late 1960s by President Jomo Kenyatta in the semi-arid parts of Nyeri South District.

== Family life ==
Nyaruai was born in about 1927 and was brought up on a white settler's farm where her father worked as a herds boy.

== Scouting ==
Nyaruai was one of the first Kenyan women to join the Scouting movement. After a white settler noticed her generosity, she convinced Nyaruai to become a Scout. Nyaruai was 10 years old. Nyaruai met Lord Baden-Powell, the founder of Scouting and is expected to attend ceremonies at his graveside in 2007 commemorating 100 years of Scouting.

== See also ==
- Scouting in Kenya
