= Africa Region (World Association of Girl Guides and Girl Scouts) =

WAGGGS divisional office in the Africa Region

- Map of members or potential members of the WAGGGS-Africa Region
- Governing body: World Association of Girl Guides and Girl Scouts

The WAGGGS-Africa Region is the divisional office of the World Association of Girl Guides and Girl Scouts, which services Guiding in Sub-Saharan Africa and neighboring islands that are recognized members of the World Association of Girl Guides and Girl Guides (WAGGGS).

This region is the counterpart of the Africa Region of the World Organization of the Scout Movement (WOSM).
