= Africa Scout Region (World Organization of the Scout Movement) =

Divisional office of the World Scout Bureau headquartered in Nairobi, Kenya

African Scout Region

- Map of members or potential members of the African Scout Region
- Owner: World Organization of the Scout Movement
- Headquarters: Nairobi, Kenya
- Website https://scout.org/africa

The Africa Scout Region is the divisional office of the World Scout Bureau of the World Organization of the Scout Movement, headquartered in Nairobi, Kenya, with satellite offices in Cape Town, South Africa, and Dakar, Senegal. The Africa Region services Scouting in Sub-Saharan Africa and neighboring islands that are recognized members of the World Organization of the Scout Movement (WOSM). Currently, the region has 39 member National Scout Associations/Organizations and 11 potential members. There are about one million registered Scouts in Africa, though it is suspected that there are about twice that number in the region. The large nations of Guinea-Bissau and the Central African Republic, and several smaller nations, are not yet WOSM members, for various reasons.

This region is the counterpart of the Africa Region of the World Association of Girl Guides and Girl Scouts (WAGGGS).

== History ==
On 13 March 1963, Scout leaders from around the region met for the first time in Lagos, Nigeria to discuss the organization of the Africa Scout Region. At the 62nd ordinary session of the Council of Ministers of the Organization of African Unity meeting in Addis Ababa, Ethiopia on 21-23 June 1995, declared 13 March the Africa Scout Day.

== Africa Network Scout Fellowship ==
The Africa Network Scout Fellowship is a forum where members of the United Kingdom Scout Association with a specific interest in Africa can share knowledge, ideas and experiences. It promotes the expansion of international Scouting, with a particular focus on building friendships in the countries of sub-Saharan Africa. Collectively the Africa Network Scout Fellowship members have experience in Angola, Botswana, Cameroon, Gambia, Ghana, Kenya, Malawi, Namibia, Nigeria, Seychelles, Sierra Leone, South Africa, Tanzania, Uganda, Zambia and Zimbabwe.

The Africa Network Scout Fellowship assists all sections of the Scout Movement, in a variety of activities-whitewater rafting, community initiatives, mountaineering, construction projects and safari adventures.

The Africa Network Scout Fellowship actively promotes expeditions to all parts of sub-Saharan Africa, and help on all aspects of an expedition, from initial planning, to British training camps, to the actual expedition itself. Africa Network Scout Fellowship meetings are held at varying locations throughout the United Kingdom.

== Africa Scout Jamborees ==
The Region has run or sponsored region-wide jamborees in its member countries. Past Jamborees include:

- 1st All-Africa Jamboree - Shere Hills, Jos Nigeria - 1976
- 2nd All-Africa Jamboree - Kaazi, Uganda - 1989
- 3rd All-Africa Jamboree - Ghana - 1994
- 4th All-Africa Jamboree - Rowallan National Scouts Camp and Jamhuri Park in Nairobi, Kenya - August 9 to 19, 2000
- 5th All-Africa Jamboree - Catembe, Mozambique - July 21 to 31, 2006
- 6th Africa Scout Jamboree - Bungere, Burundi - July 28 to August 5, 2012
- 7th Africa Scout Jamboree - Yamoussoukro, Côte d'Ivoire - August 1 to 10, 2016
- 8th Africa Scout Jamboree - Virtual, Uganda (in person events) - July 29 to August 3, 2021
- 9th Africa Scout Jamboree - Bungere National Scout Camp, Burundi - August 2 to 11, 2024

The 10th Africa Scout Jamboree, in 2029, is scheduled to be hosted in Niger.

== Africa Rover Moots ==
It recent years, the Region has organised and sponsored region-wide rover moots. Past Moots include:

- 1st Africa Rover Moot - Rowallan National Scouts Camp in Nairobi, Kenya - April 15 to 25, 2023
- 2nd Africa Rover Moot - Arrowe Park in Johannesburg, South Africa - August 1 to 8, 2026

== See also ==
- Frederick Russell Burnham
- Rubina Marivonne Haroon
- Kinuthia Murugu
