= List of Scouts =

This is a list of notable Scouts and Scouters.

== Africa ==
=== Ghana ===
Name	Notability	References
Hon. Nana Amanfi III	CBE, Omanhene (Paramount Chief) of Asebu State	
Peter Awoonor-Renner	Chairman of APSOG	

=== Kenya ===
Name	Notability	References
Jeremiah J.M. Nyagah	Chief Scout. Recipient, Bronze Wolf, 1982.	
Elizabeth Nyaruai	Scout.	

=== Libya ===
Name	Notability	References
Ali Khalifa el-Zaidi	Recipient, Bronze Wolf, 1965.	
Muammar Gaddafi	Autocratic ruler of Libya	

=== Morocco ===
Name	Notability	References
Abdelaziz Drissi-Kacemi	Recipient, Bronze Wolf.	
Mahmoud el-Alamy	Recipient, Bronze Wolf, 1978.	
Mohamed Afilal	Recipient, Bronze Wolf, 2005.	
Moulay Rachid ben al Hassan	President, Fédération Nationale du Scoutisme Marocain.	

=== Rwanda ===
RWANDA SCOUT ASSOCIATION

Name / Notability / References; IGIRANEZA Valentin (Lapin Brillante), UWASE TETA Diolinda (Senge Souryante), RUTAHANA M. Dan(Girraffé Courageux) and NIYOMUNGERI Christian (Tirteau Malbar) / Founders of Groupe de Base Kiziguro Chasse au Loup in 2022. / https://whatsapp.com/channel/0029VaAaapG05MUiCBtdAx2G/1917

=== South Africa ===
Name	Notability	References
Victor J. Clapham	Originator of the Join-In Jamboree. Founder of Veld Lore. Recipient, Bronze Wolf, 1976.	
Herbert William Garnet de la Hunt	Cub; Scout; Scoutmaster; Commissioner; Chief Scout; Vice Chairman, Africa Region; Chairman, World Scout Committee; Vice President, South Africa Scout Association; Chairman, National Scout Council. Recipient, Bronze Wolf, 1996.	

== Asia ==
=== Bangladesh ===
Name	Notability	References
Md. Abul Kalam Azad	President, Bangladesh Scouts.	
Dr. Md. Mozammel Haque Khan	Chief National Commissioner	

=== Cambodia ===
Name	Notability	References
Leang Meng Ho	Post-Khmer Rouge Scouting pioneer.	
Sisowath Monireth	Scouting pioneer.	

=== China ===
Name	Notability	References
Noel Jacobs	Jewish British Scoutmaster, Shanghai.	
F. C. Millington	British Scoutmaster, Shanghai.	
Fredy Mittler	Austrian Scouter, Shanghai.	
Sun Li-jen / 孫立人	Scout. Military commander.	
G. R. Welch	British Scoutmaster, Shanghai.	
L. R. Wheen	British Scoutmaster, Shanghai.	
Yang Huimin / 楊惠敏	Scout and heroine, Battle of Shanghai, 1937. Depicted in Eight Hundred Heroes.	
Yen Chia-lin	Following the birth of the Republic of China, the first Scout troop was organized by Reverend Yen Chia-lin in Wuchang on 25 February 1912.	

=== Hong Kong ===
Name	Notability	References
Francis Henry May	Chief Scout.	
Tung Chee Hwa	Chief Scout.	

=== India ===
Name	Notability	References
George Sydney Arundale	Co-Founder, Indian Scout Association.	
Girija Shankar Bajpai	Co-Founder, Seva Samiti.	
T. H. Baker	Scouting started in India in the year 1909, when Captain T.H. Baker established the first Scout Troop in Bangalore and got it registered with Imperial Headquarters, London.	
Annie Besant	Founder, Indian Scout Association.	
Vivian Bose	Pioneer of Scouting for Indian boys.	
Shankarrao Chavan	President, Bharat Scouts and Guides.	
Dharma Vīra	President, Bharat Scouts and Guides.	
Lalit Mohan Jain	National Commissioner, Bharat Scouts and Guides. Recipient, Bronze Wolf, 2008.	
Hrdaya Nāth Kunzru	Co-Founder, Seva Samiti.	
Madan Mohan Malaviya	Co-Founder, Seva Samiti.	
Lakshmi Mazumdar	National Commissioner, Bharat Scouts and Guides. Recipient, Bronze Wolf, 1969.	
Mangal Dās Pakvasa	President, Bharat Scouts and Guides.	
Sharad Pawar	President, Bharat Scouts and Guides.	
Alfred Donald Pickford (1872-1947)	Scouting pioneer. Served as Calcutta District Scout Commissioner in 1916, and in May 1919 was promoted to Chief Scout Commissioner for India.	
Jagjīvan Rām	President, Bharat Scouts and Guides.	
Rustomji Edulji Sethna (1898–1954)	Pioneer of Scouting for Indian boys. Sethna's 18th West Bombay Scout Group, established in 1914, is the oldest continuously running Scout Group in India.	
Evelyn Norah Shullai	Guide, Guider.	
Bhuvaneshwar Prasād Sinha	President, Bharat Scouts and Guides.	
Ammu Swāmīnāthan	President, Bharat Scouts and Guides.	
Rameshwar Thākur	President, Bharat Scouts and Guides.	
Chandulal Madhavlal Trivedi	President, Bharat Scouts and Guides.	

=== Indonesia ===
Name / Notability / References; Hamengkubuwono IX / Recipient, Bronze Wolf, 1973.

=== Iran ===
Name / Notability / References; Hossein Banai / Served on the World Scout Committee, 1959-65 and 1967-73. Recipient, Bronze Wolf, 1961.

=== Japan ===
Name	Notability	References
Hōjō Tokiyuki	Scouting pioneer	
Clarence Griffin	After Griffin's death in 1951, the Boy Scouts of Nippon (Scout Association of Japan since 1995) placed a marker on his grave at the Yokohama Foreign General Cemetery (Yokohama Gaikokujin Bochi) honoring him as Japan's first Scoutmaster.	
Joseph Janning	Founder, International Boy Scouts, Troop 1	
Kurushima Takehiko	Scouting pioneer; attended 2nd World Scout Jamboree	
Yoshinori Futara	Scouting pioneer	
Michiharu Mishima	Scouting pioneer, Chief Scout, recipient, Bronze Wolf, 1961	
Sano Tsuneha	Naval officer; attended Wood Badge course at Gilwell, pioneered adult training in Japan.	
Hidesaburō Kurushima	Chief Scout, recipient, Bronze Wolf, 1967	
Taizō Ishizaka	Recipient, Bronze Wolf, 1971	
Saburō Matsukata	Chief Scout, recipient, Bronze Wolf, 1972	
Shintarō Negishi	Recipient, Bronze Wolf, 1975.	
Akira Watanabe	Chief Scout, recipient, Bronze Wolf, 1977	
Yorihiro Matsudaira	Recipient, Bronze Wolf, 1981	
August S. Narumi	Recipient, Bronze Wolf, 1984	
Ichiro Terao	Recipient, Bronze Wolf, 1985	
Yoshio Sakurauchi	Recipient, Bronze Wolf, 1986	
Ken Harada	Recipient, Bronze Wolf, 1989	
Masaru Ibuka	Recipient, Bronze Wolf, 1991	
Ayakazu Hirose	Recipient, Bronze Wolf, 1992	
Ko Yoshida	Recipient, Bronze Wolf, 1993	
Teiji Takemiya	Recipient, Bronze Wolf, 1998	
Fujio Imada	Recipient, Bronze Wolf, 2004	
Toby Takemichi Suzuki	Recipient, Bronze Wolf, 2007	
Yoritake Matsudaira	Recipient, Bronze Wolf, 2012	
1st World Scout Jamboree contingent	Three-person delegation of Scouter Toyomatsu Shimoda, Scouter Hiroshi Koshiba, and Scout Richard Shin Suzuki who attended the 1920 World Jamboree in England	

=== Korea ===
Name	Notability	References
Ban Ki-moon	Eighth and current Secretary-General of the United Nations	
Kim Kyu-young	Director of the World Scout Bureau Asia-Pacific Office, Makati, Philippines. Recipient, Bronze Wolf, 2002.	
Lee Yun-sook	politician	

=== Malaysia ===
Name	Notability	References
Anwar Ibrahim	10th Prime Minister of Malaysia (2022–present); 7th Deputy Prime Minister of Malaysia (1993–1998); 12th and 16th Leader of the Opposition (2008–2015; 2020–2022); Minister of Finance of Malaysia (1991–1998; 2022–present); Minister of Education of Malaysia (1986–1991); Minister of Agriculture of Malaysia (1984–1986); Minister of Culture, Youth and Sports of Malaysia (1983–1984); Member of the Malaysian Parliament for Tambun (2022–present), Port Dickson (2018–2022) and Permatang Pauh (1982–1999; 2008–2015)	
Eric Khoo Heng-Pheng	Member of the World Scout Committee (2008–2014); Chairman of the Asia Pacific Regional Scout Committee (2004–2007); Recipient of King's Scout Award (1973)	
Johari Abdul	11th Speaker of the Dewan Rakyat (2022–present); Member of the Malaysian Parliament for Sungai Petani (2008–2022); Member of the Kedah State Legislative Assembly for Gurun (2018–2022)	
Kamarul Ariffin Mohd Yassin	Chairman of the World Scout Committee (1983–1985); Vice-Chairman of the World Scout Committee (1980–1983); Recipient of Bronze Wolf Award (1983)	
Kasih Iris Leona Azhar	Recipient of King's Scout Award (2019)	
Mohd Zin Bidin	Member of the Asia Pacific Regional Scout Committee (2022–present); 7th National Chief Scout of Malaysia (2023–present); 13th National Chief Scout Commissioner of Malaysia (2016–2024); Recipient of King's Scout Award (1971)	
Pkharuddin Ghazali	19th Malaysian Director-General of Education (2022–2023); Recipient of King's Scout Award (1981)	
Shamsul Iskandar Mohd Akin	Senior Political Secretary to the Prime Minister of Malaysia (2022–2025); Deputy Minister of Primary Industries of Malaysia (2018–2020); Member of the Malaysian Parliament for Hang Tuah Jaya (2018–2022) and Bukit Katil (2013–2018); Recipient of King's Scout Award (1991)	
Syed Ahmad Idid Syed Abdullah	Malaysian High Court judge (1990–1996); Recipient of King's Scout Award (1954)	
Syed Hashim Abdullah	6th National Chief Scout Commissioner of Malaysia {1969–1987); Recipient of Bronze Wolf Award (1974)	

=== Maldives ===
Name / Notability / References; Mohammed Jaisham Ibrahim / saved the President of Maldives Maumoon Abdul Gayoom from assassination

=== Philippines ===
Name	Notability	References
Valeriano Abello	Hero	
Estefania Aldaba-Lim	GSP President	
Benigno Aquino III	Chief Scout	
Corazon Aquino	Chief Scout. Chief Girl Scout.	
Jejomar Binay	BSP National President	
Elwood Brown	First Scoutmaster of the Philippines, 1910	
Manuel Camus	BSP Charter Member	
Tomás Confesór	Legislator	
Gabriel Daza	BSP Charter Member, President and Chief Scout of the BSP, Reorganised BSP	
Antonio C. Delgado	Ambassador	
Josefa Llanes Escoda	GSP Founder	
Joseph Estrada	Chief Scout	
Roilo Golez	BSP National President	
Ralph Hawkins	BSP National Director	
Pilar Hidalgo-Lim	GSP Co-Founder	
Vicente Lim	BSP Charter Member	
Gloria Macapagal Arroyo	Chief Scout. Chief Girl Scout.	
Ferdinand Marcos	Chief Scout	
Imelda Marcos	Chief Girl Scout	
Guillermo Padolina	BSP National Director	
Roberto Pagdanganan	BSP National President	
William H. Quasha	Scouter	
Manuel Quezon	President, Commonwealth of the Philippines	
Fidel V. Ramos	Chief Scout	
Hermenegildo Reyes	Member, World Scout Committee	
Carlos P. Romulo	BSP Charter Member	
Samuel Stagg	BSA Commissioner	
Joseph E. Stevenot	BSP Founder	
Jorge B. Vargas	Member, World Scout Committee	

=== Singapore ===
Name	Notability	References
Lee Kuan Yew	First Prime Minister of Singapore	
Goh Chok Tong	Second Prime Minister of Singapore	
Yong Pung How	Former Chief Justice of Singapore	
Ong Teng Cheong	Fifth (First Elected) President of Singapore	
S.R. Nathan	Sixth President of Singapore	
Tony Tan	Seventh President of Singapore	

=== Sri Lanka ===
Name	Notability	References
Senator E. W. Kannangara	World Scout Committee Member	
Kingsley C. Dassanaike	Bronze Wolf	

=== Thailand ===
Name / Notability / References; Abhai Chandavimol / Member, World Scout Committee. Recipient, Bronze Wolf, 1971.

=== Vietnam ===
Name	Notability	References
Trần văn Khắc	Founder of Vietnamese Scouting, 1930. He was assisted in the early years by Tạ Văn Rục, Hoàng Đạo Thúy, Lương Thái, Huỳnh văn Diệp, and Trần Con. After the 1975 Communist takeover of South Vietnam, Trần văn Khắc migrated and lived out life in Canada.	
Hoàng Đạo Thúy (1900-1994)	Scout leader in North Vietnam and Communist Party member.	Hoàng Đạo Thúy
Tạ Quang Bửu (1910-1986)	First Deputy Gilwell Camp Chief of Việt Nam. Deputy Defense Minister, North Vietnam.	Tạ Quang Bửu
Cung Giũ Nguyên (1909-2008)	Scoutmaster. In 1958 the Tùng Nguyên national training camp was established under his leadership, where all Scoutmasters trained between 1958 and 1975.	Cung Giũ Nguyên
Nguyễn Hữu Đang (1913-2007)	Raider Scout. High-ranking Communist operative. Scouting leader. Attempted to convince other Scout leaders to join Communist Party. Purged from the Party and arrested 1958.	Nguyễn Hữu Đang
Lưu Hữu Phước (1921-1989)	Composer.	Lưu Hữu Phước

==== Vietnamese Scouting in exile ====
Name	Notability	References
Nguyễn Quang Minh	Scouts-in-exile organizer.	
Nguyễn văn Thuất	President, International Central Committee of Vietnamese Scouting, 2002-06	

== Eurasia ==
=== Armenia ===
Name	Notability	References
Kourkène Medzadourian	Scouting-in-exile founder	
Bagrat Yesayan	World Scout Committee, editor in chief of Yerker Daily newspaper	

=== Azerbaijan ===
Name / Notability / References; Ilyas Ismayilli / president of the Association of Scouts of Azerbaijan

== Europe ==
=== Austria ===
Name	Notability	References
Hermann Buhl	first mountaineer to Scale Nanga Parbat	
Marie Antoinette Hofmann	Guiding pioneer	
Heinrich Maier	important Nazi resistance fighter	
Emmerich Teuber (1877-1943)	Began the first Scouting group in Vienna in 1912, later served on the International Committee of the World Organization of the Scout Movement from its creation in 1922 until 1929	

=== Belgium ===
Name	Notability	References
Albert II of Belgium	King of the Belgians, 1993-2013	
Baudouin of Belgium	King of the Belgians, 1951-1993	
Jacques Brel	singer	
Jean-Luc Dehaene	Prime Minister of Belgium	
Hergé	Belgian cartoonist and creator of The Adventures of Tintin	
Leo Tindemans	Prime Minister of Belgium	

=== Czech Republic ===
Name / Notability / References; Václav Havel / 1st president of the Czech Republic

=== Denmark ===
Name	Notability	References
Ove Holm	First patrol leader and later Chief Scout 1924-1960, Bronze Wolf 1949	
Ingrid of Sweden	chairman for Joint Committee of Girl Guides in Denmark	
Princess Benedikte of Denmark	chairman for Joint Committee of Girl Guides in Denmark	
Frederik IX of Denmark	King of Denmark 1947-1972	
Jens Hvass	Forester and influential leader of Det Danske Spejderkorps, Bronze Wolf 1957	
Vilhelm Bjerregaard	Author and troop leader, later BSA leader, Bronze Wolf 1985	

=== France ===
Name	Notability	References
Jacques Sevin	Jesuit priest, founder of Scouts de France, candidate for canonization	
Raymond Schlemmer	Scouting leader in France and Indochina	
Pierre de Coubertin	founder of the International Olympic Committee and the inter-religious Eclaireurs Français (EF), now the Eclaireuses et Eclaireurs de France	
Pierre Joubert	Illustrator of Scouting and other children's books.	"Le site officiel de Pierre Joubert". pierre-joubert.org.
Valéry Giscard d'Estaing	Former President of the French Republic	"Valery Giscard d'Estaing, young, as a boy scout, 12 years old, in 1938". The Granger Collection.
Jacques Chirac	Former President of the French Republic	
Lionel Jospin	Former Prime Minister of France	
Michel Rocard	Former Prime Minister of France	
Michel Debré	Former Prime Minister of France	
Edouard Balladur	Former Prime Minister of France	
René Mouchotte	Free French Air Force fighter pilot	
Paul-Émile Victor	Arctic and Antarctic explorer	
Henri Lhote	Saharan explorer and ethnographer	
Marcel Marceau	actor and mime artist	

=== Greece ===
Name / Notability / References; Demetrios Alexatos / Commissioner, Soma Hellinon Proskopon. Member, World Scout Committee, 1957-63. Recipient, Bronze Wolf, 1963.

=== Hungary and Hungarian Scouting ===
Name	Notability	References
László Almásy	Pilot.	
Béla Heinrich Bánáthy	Scout.	
Gábor Bodnár	Organizer of Hungarian Scouts in exile.	
Fritz M. de Molnár	Scouting pioneer. Deputy Camp Chief.	
László Nagy	Secretary General of the World Organization of the Scout Movement, 1968-1988	
Aladar de Szillassy	Scouting pioneer.	
István Kanitz	Scouting pioneer.	
Kisbarnaki Farkas Ferenc	Chief Scout.	
Králik László	Scouting pioneer.	
Sík Sándor	Scouting pioneer.	
Pál Teleki	Chief Scout.	

=== Iceland ===
Name	Notability	References
Páll Gíslason	Chief Scout. Recipient, Bronze Wolf, 1981.	
Ingvar Ólafsson	Scouting was introduced in Iceland as early as 1911, when Ingvar Ólafsson, who had entered the Scout Movement in Denmark, formed the first Boy Scout patrol.	
Helgi Tómasson	Chief Scout	
Axel Tulinius	First Chief Scout, Bandalag Íslenskra Skáta, 1925-38.	

=== Ireland ===
Name	Notability	References
Brendan Corish	Tánaiste from 1973 to 1977.	
Liam Cosgrave	Taoiseach of Ireland from 1973 to 1977.	
Brian Cowen	Taoiseach of Ireland from 2008 to 2011.	
Bob Geldof	Singer-songwriter and political activist.	
Ernest Farrell	Co-Founder, Catholic Boy Scouts of Ireland.	
Tom Farrell	Co-Founder, Catholic Boy Scouts of Ireland.	
Richard P. Fortune	Founder, Scouting in Ireland.	
Graham Norton	Comedian and television presenter	
Michael O'Leary	Chief executive officer of Ryanair	
Cornelius Ryan	Journalist and author mainly known for his writings The Longest Day, and A Bridge Too Far.	

=== Italy ===
Name / Notability / References; Eduardo Missoni / medical doctor and Secretary General of the WOSM from April 1, 2004 through November 30, 2007

=== Netherlands ===
Name	Notability	References
Jan Peter Balkenende	Prime Minister	
Crien Bolhuis-Schilstra	scout leader	
Jo Cals	Prime Minister	
Arjan Erkel	medical aid worker for Médecins Sans Frontières (MSF), abducted in Dagestan	
Jan van Hoof	member of the Dutch resistance (Operation Market Garden)	
Henk Kamp	politician	
Bert Koenders	politician	
Piet J. Kroonenberg	Scouting historian and author. Recipient, Bronze Wolf, 1996.	
Willem Oltmans	journalist	
Frits Philips	chairman of the board of directors of Dutch electronics company Philips	
Jean Jacques Rambonnet	vice admiral, Minister (Navy, Colonies, War), the only Chief Scout of the Netherlands prior to 2021	
Joost Swarte	comic artist and graphical designer	
Freek Vonk	biologist, Chief Scout of Scouting Nederland	
Beatrix of the Netherlands		
Juliana of the Netherlands	also known as Movavedo (Mother of many daughters)	
Duke Hendrik of Mecklenburg-Schwerin	Prince of the Netherlands, Prince Consort, Chairman of Netherlands Pathfinders	
Princess Máxima of the Netherlands	Princess of Orange, now patron of Scouting Nederland	
Princess Christina of the Netherlands		
Claus von Amsberg	Prince of the Netherlands, Jonkheer van Amsberg, Prince Consort	
Princess Irene of the Netherlands		
Princess Margriet of the Netherlands		

=== Norway ===
Name / Notability / References; Kari Aas / Guider. Designed World Guide Flag.

=== Poland ===
Name	Notability	References
Jan Roman Bytnar	Scouter. Szarych Szeregów.	
Sławomir Maciej Bittner	Scoutmaster. Officer, Armia Krajowa. Arrested and killed by Gestapo.	
Stanisław Broniewski	Naczelnik (Chief Scout), Szare Szeregi. Officer, Armia Krajowa.	
Tadeusz Chciuk	Biali Kurierzy, Szare Szeregi.	
Aleksander Maciej Dawidowski	Scouter. Szarych Szeregów.	
Jadwiga Falkowska	Co-Founder of Polish Girl Guides. Executed by the Russians.	
Stefan Wincenty Frelichowski	Scout. Scouter. Priest. Died in Nazi prison. Beatified.	
Józef Andrzej Grzesiak	Scoutmaster. Szarych Szeregów.	
Kazimierz Iwiński	Teacher. Education official. Scouter. Commander of Scout resistance fighters.	
Karolina Kaczorowska	First Lady of Poland in exile.	
Ryszard Kaczorowski	President of Poland in exile.	
Aleksander Kamiński	Teacher, Scoutmaster, Szarych Szeregów. Editor-in-Chief, Biuletyn Informacyjny, Armia Krajowa. Declared Righteous Among the Nations.	
Józefa Kantor	Founder of Mury, the clandestine Polish Girl Guide group inside Ravensbrück concentration camp.	
Anna Komorowska	First Lady of Poland.	
Bronisław Maria Komorowski	President of Poland.	
Kazimierz Lutosławski	Physician, priest, Scouter.	
Andrzej Małkowski and Olga Drahonowska-Małkowska	Founders of Scouting and Guiding in Poland. Andrzej translated Scouting for Boys into Polish.	
Florian Marciniak	Naczelnik (Chief Scout), Szare Szeregi. Executed by the Nazis.	
Kazimierz Piechowski	War hero	
Witold Pilecki	ZHP Scout and soldier. Armia Krajowa intelligence officer. Allied spy and war hero.	
Józef Pukowiec	Teacher. Scoutmaster. Tortured and killed by Nazis.	
Jan Rodowicz	Scouter. Szarych Szeregów.	
Andrzej Romocki	Scouter. Szarych Szeregów.	
Kazimierz Aleksander Sabbat	President of Poland in exile.	
Stanisław Sedlaczek	Professor. Scoutmaster. Murdered at Auschwitz.	
Eugeniusz Stasiecki	Scouter. Szarych Szeregów.	
Tadeusz Strumiłło	Scouter. President of the ZHP. Professor of the underground university system.	
Anna Zawadzka	Sister of Tadeusz Zawadzki. Scouter. Szarych Szeregów. Teacher. Vice President of the post-Communist ZHP.	
Tadeusz Zawadzki	Codename "Zośka." Scouter. Szarych Szeregów, after whom the Batalion Zośka was named.	
Jerzy Eugeniusz Zborowski	Scoutmaster. Commander, Batalion Parasol, Armia Krajowa.	

=== Serbia ===
Name	Notability	References
Vlade Divac	retired basketball player	
Serbian Patriarch Pavle	44th Patriarch of the Serbian Orthodox Church	
Emir Kusturica	filmmaker, actor and musician	
Mika Antić	poet, movie director, journalist and painter	
Desanka Maksimović	poet	

=== Sweden ===
Name	Notability	References
Carl XVI Gustaf	King.	
Gustaf VI Adolf	King, Chief Scout.	
Prince Gustaf Adolf, Duke of Västerbotten	Gustaf Adolf was a Boy Scout and as an adult became a Scoutmaster. He earned his Wood Badge beads at Gilwell Park in England. When the Svenska Scoutrådet was formed, he served as its first president or Chief Scout. He was leader of the Swedish contingent at the 5th World Scout Jamboree in 1937 and to the World Scout Moot in 1939. He served on the World Scout Committee from May 1937 until his death.	
Folke Bernadotte	Diplomat, United Nations mediator in Palestine.	
Carl-Henric Svanberg	CEO of BP.	

=== Switzerland ===
Name	Notability	References
Walther von Bonstetten	Prominent Scouting leader. Founder of Kandersteg International Scout Centre. Recipient, Bronze Wolf, 1937.	
László Nagy	An expert in sociology and political science, he was a research specialist at the Graduate Institute of International Studies in Geneva when the Institute, under contract with the World Scout Bureau and the Ford Foundation, assigned him to conduct a two-year international study of the Scout Movement. This led to reorganization of the World Organization of the Scout Movement and his appointment as Secretary General. Recipient, Bronze Wolf, 1977.	

=== Turkey ===
Name / Notability / References; Şenay Aybüke Yalçın / A scout leader who killed by PKK

=== United Kingdom ===
==== Baden-Powell Scouts Association ====
Name / Notability / References; Lawrie Dring (1931–2012) / Co-Founder, Baden-Powell Scouts' Association. Founder, World Federation of Independent Scouts.

==== Girlguiding UK ====
Name	Notability	References
Anne, Princess Royal		
Cherie Booth	human rights lawyer	
Betty Boothroyd	first female Speaker of the House of Commons	
Elizabeth Bowes-Lyon	Queen Consort	
Queen Elizabeth II		
Dame Tanni Grey-Thompson	athlete and television presenter	
Glenda Jackson	actress and politician	
Lorraine Kelly	television presenter	
Princess Margaret		
Mo Mowlam	politician	
Dame Anita Roddick	entrepreneur and environmental campaigner	
Helen Sharman	the first British woman in space	
Delia Smith	television chef	
Faye White	athlete and sports commentator	

==== The Scout Association ====
Name	Notability	References
Henry Allingham	World War I veteran believed to have been the oldest Scout in Europe	
David Attenborough	Naturalist, TV personality	
Vera Barclay	First prominent Cub leader. Authored Jungle Wisdom.	
David Beckham	midfielder of the England football squad	
David Bellamy	TV personality	
Tony Benn	Politician	
Tony Blair	Former-Prime Minister of the United Kingdom	
Chris Bonington	mountaineer	
David Bowie	singer-songwriter, producer and actor	
Gyles Brandreth	author and politician	
Richard Branson	Entrepreneur	
Sir Trevor Brooking	footballer	
Ernest Stafford Carlos	painter and war artist	
Catherine, Duchess of Cambridge	wife of Prince William, Duke of Cambridge	
Brian Clough	football manager	
Nigel Clough	Footballer	
Thomas Corbett, 2nd Baron Rowallan	Governor of Tasmania and Chief Scout of the British Commonwealth, 1945-1959	
Jack Cornwell	war hero	
John Craven	TV personality	
Jim Davidson	entertainer	
Ken Dodd	entertainer	
Roger Gale	politician	
Bear Grylls	TV presenter, adventurer and writer, Chief Scout of the United Kingdom since 2009	
Richard Hammond	TV presenter	
Mike Harding	comedian/songwriter and radio presenter	
Ainsley Harriott	TV chef	
James Jakes	Racing driver; sponsored by the Boy Scouts of America for the 2012 IndyCar season	
Rhys Jones	youngest Briton to climb Mount Everest	
Natasha Kaplinsky	BBC news presenter	
Neil Kinnock	politician	
Sammy Lee	footballer	
William Frederick de Bois Maclaren (1856–1921)	Businessman and District Scout Commissioner of Rosneath, Dunbartonshire, Scotland. Donated Gilwell Park to the Scout Movement. In his honor, the Clan MacLaren tartan adorns the Wood Badge neckerchief in most, if not all, countries implementing the Wood Badge program.	
John Major	former Prime Minister	
Simon Mayo	disc jockey/TV presenter	
Paul McCartney	singer/songwriter/bassist of the Beatles and Wings	
Ray Mears	Survival expert, TV personality	
Derek Mountfield	footballer	
Denis Norden	TV personality	
Jamie Oliver	celebrity chef	
Michael Owen	footballer	
Michael Parkinson	radio presenter, TV personality	
Jeremy Paxman	TV/news presenter	
Roland Philipps	Scouter.	
Tim Peake	Former regular British Army Air Corps officer and a current European Space Agency astronaut and International Space Station crew	
William Henry Ralph Reader (1903–1982)	Actor, theatrical producer, songwriter, intelligence officer. Founder of The Gang Show. Recipient, Bronze Wolf, 1975.	
Cliff Richard	entertainer	
Keith Richards	Guitarist/Singer/Songwriter	
Bobby Robson	former England football manager	
Roger Scruton	philosopher	
David Seaman	footballer	
Chris Tarrant	TV personality	
Harold Wilson	former Prime Minister of the United Kingdom	
Antony Worrall Thompson	chef and television presenter	
John Thurman / Richard Francis Thurman	Camp Chief, Gilwell, 1943-69. Authored many Scouting books. Recipient, Bronze Wolf, 1959.	
Francis Vane / Francis Patrick Fletcher Vane (5th Baronet Fletcher-Vane of Hutton)	Soldier. Second Boer War veteran. Commissioner, The Boy Scouts Association. Founder, The British Boy Scouts (later The Brotherhood of British Scouts). Founder and Grand Scout Master, Order of World Scouts, the oldest Scout federation.	
John Skinner Wilson (1888–1969)	Soldier, intelligence officer, Scout leader. Senior Deputy Police Commissioner, Calcutta. District Scout Commissioner, Calcutta. Camp Chief, Gilwell. Director, Boy Scouts International Bureau. Held first Wood Badge Course in the USA. Recipient, Bronze Wolf, 1937.	

== Latin America ==
=== Argentina ===
Name	Notability	References
Russell D. Christian	Scouting pioneer.	
Francisco Pascasio Moreno	Scouting pioneer.	

=== Brazil ===
Name	Notability	References
Itamar Franco	Brazilian president	
José Alencar	Brazilian vice-president	
Juscelino Kubitschek	Brazilian president	

=== Chile ===
Name / Notability / References; Paula Pelaez / Recipient, Bronze Wolf.

=== Cuba ===
Name / Notability / References; Salvador Fernández Beltrán / General Secretary of the Inter-American Advisory Committee, assisted in the creation of the InterAmerican Scout Office. Recipient, Bronze Wolf, 1957.

=== Ecuador ===
Name	Notability	References
Rafael Correa	President	
Ivan Vallejo	Mountaineer	

=== Mexico ===
Name / Notability / References; Juan Lainé (1884-1977) / Served on the World Scout Committee from 1947 to 1949 and again from 1951 to 1957. Recipient, Bronze Wolf, 1966.

=== Peru ===
Name / Notability / References; Elias Mendoza / Recipient, Bronze Wolf, 1972.

=== Venezuela ===
Name	Notability	References
Adolfo Aristeguieta Gramcko	Surgeon, psychiatrist, homeopath. Scout leader; served at local, national, and international levels. Recipient, Bronze Wolf, 1976.	
Gustavo J. Vollmer	Chairman of the World Scout Committee. Recipient, Bronze Wolf, 1969.	

== Middle East ==
=== Egypt ===
Name / Notability / References; Mohamed Ali Hafez / Served on the World Scout Committee from 1957 to 1963 and again from 1965 to 1971. Recipient, Bronze Wolf, 1965.

=== Israel ===
Name	Notability	References
Reuven Rivlin	President	
Benjamin Netanyahu	Prime Minister	
Gidi Gov	Singer, TV host, entertainer and actor	
Yuval Banay	Musician	
Shlomi Braha	Rock musician and record producer	
Din Din Aviv	Pop and folk singer	
Mickey Edelstein	Major-general in the Israeli Defense Forces	
Lucy Ayoub	Television presenter	
Tamar Ish-Shalom	Television presenter and Israeli journalist	
Merav Michaeli	Israeli politician	
Miki Haimovich	Israeli politician	
Doron Medalie	Israeli songwriter, composer and artistic director	
Eitan Ben Eliyahu	Commander of the Israeli Air Force	
Oded Menashe	Israeli actor, magician and television presenter	
Michaela Bercu	Israeli model and actress	
Kobi Oshrat	Israeli composer and conductor	

=== Lebanon ===
Name	Notability	References
Muhammad el-Hibri	Son of Toufik el-Hibri. Recipient, Bronze Wolf, 1972.	
Toufik El Hibri	Pioneer of Scouting in Arabia.	
Bachir Gemayel	President.	

=== Syria ===
Name / Notability / References; Ali Abdulkarim al-Dandachi (1907–2000) / Vice President, Boy Scouts de Syrie. Served on Boy Scouts International Committee, 1951-57. Promoted Scouting throughout the Middle East. Recipient, Bronze Wolf, 1969.

== North America ==
=== Bahamas ===
Name / Notability / References; John R. Phillpot / International Commissioner of the Scout Association of the Bahamas, recipient, Bronze Wolf, 1986

=== Canada ===
Name	Notability	References
Syl Apps	Professional Hockey Player	
Pierre Berton	Author, Journalist	
Leonard Cohen	Singer-Songwriter	
Jean-François Carrey	youngest Canadian to climb Mount Everest	
Jean Chrétien	Prime Minister	
Jim Creeggan	Musician	
Roméo Dallaire	Humanitarian, Senator, Lieutenant-General	
A. Wallace Denny	Deputy Chief Scout, Boy Scouts of Canada, recipient, Bronze Wolf, 1977	
John Diefenbaker	Prime Minister	
Jackson Dodds	Deputy Chief Scout for Canada. Recipient, Bronze Wolf, 1955	
Michael J. Fox	Actor	
Chris Hadfield	Astronaut, Cub-Scout in Milton, Ontario	
Stephen Harper	Prime Minister	
Len Jarrett	Director, Boy Scouts International Bureau (London), Boy Scouts World Bureau (Ottawa), and World Scout Bureau (Geneva), 1955-81 consultant for the Bureau 1981-86, organizer of Jamboree-on-the-Air 1958-88, recipient, Bronze Wolf, 1973	
Craig Kielburger	Children's rights activist, member, Board of Governors, Scouts Canada	
Roméo LeBlanc	Governor-General	
Gordon Lightfoot	Singer-Songwriter	
Steve MacLean	astronaut	
Paul Martin	Prime Minister	
Howie Meeker	Professional Hocky Player	
Roland Michener	Governor-General	
Gus Mortson	Professional Hockey Player	
Brian Mulroney	Prime Minister	
Kevin Newman	journalist and broadcaster	
Seamus O'Regan	journalist and broadcaster, cabinet minister	
Steven Page	Singer, Songwriter	
J. Percy Ross	Chief Executive, Boy Scouts of Canada, recipient, Bronze Wolf, 1978	
Sid Smith	Professional Hockey Player	
Daniel Spry (1913-1989)	World War II general, Director, Boy Scouts World Bureau	
Pierre Trudeau	Prime Minister	
W. Brett Wilson	entrepreneur	

=== United States ===
==== Girl Scouts of the USA ====
These notable individuals were in the Girl Scouts of the USA (GSUSA). Also see Gold Award recipients.

Name	Notability	References
Betsy Boze	President of The College of The Bahamas and senior fellow at American Association of State Colleges and Universities	
Barbara Bush	former First Lady of the United States	
Laura Bush	former First Lady of the United States	
Rosalynn Carter	former First Lady of the United States	
Hillary Clinton	former First Lady of the United States	
Tipper Gore	former Second Lady of the United States	
Lou Henry Hoover	former First Lady of the United States	
Dolores Huerta	Labor Leader	
Juliette Gordon Low	Founder of the Girl Scouts of the USA. Helped found European Guides	
Kathy Mattea	singer	
Pat Nixon	former First Lady of the United States	
Michelle Obama	former First Lady of the United States	
Nancy Reagan	former First Lady of the United States	
Robin Roberts	newscaster	
Edith Wilson	former First Lady of the United States	
Carrie Fisher	Actress	
Debbie Reynolds	Member, Troop Leader, Pied Piper Earned Curved Bar Award Actress	
Gloria Steinem	Women's Rights Activist	
Barbara Walters	Journalist	
Taylor Swift	Artist	
Gwyneth Paltrow	Actress	
Lisa Ling	Journalist	
Chelsea Clinton		
Dakota Fanning	Actress	
Abigail Breslin	Actress	
Mariah Carey	Artist	
Sandra Day O'Connor	Former Supreme Court Justice	
Sally Ride	Astronaut	

==== Boy Scouts of America ====
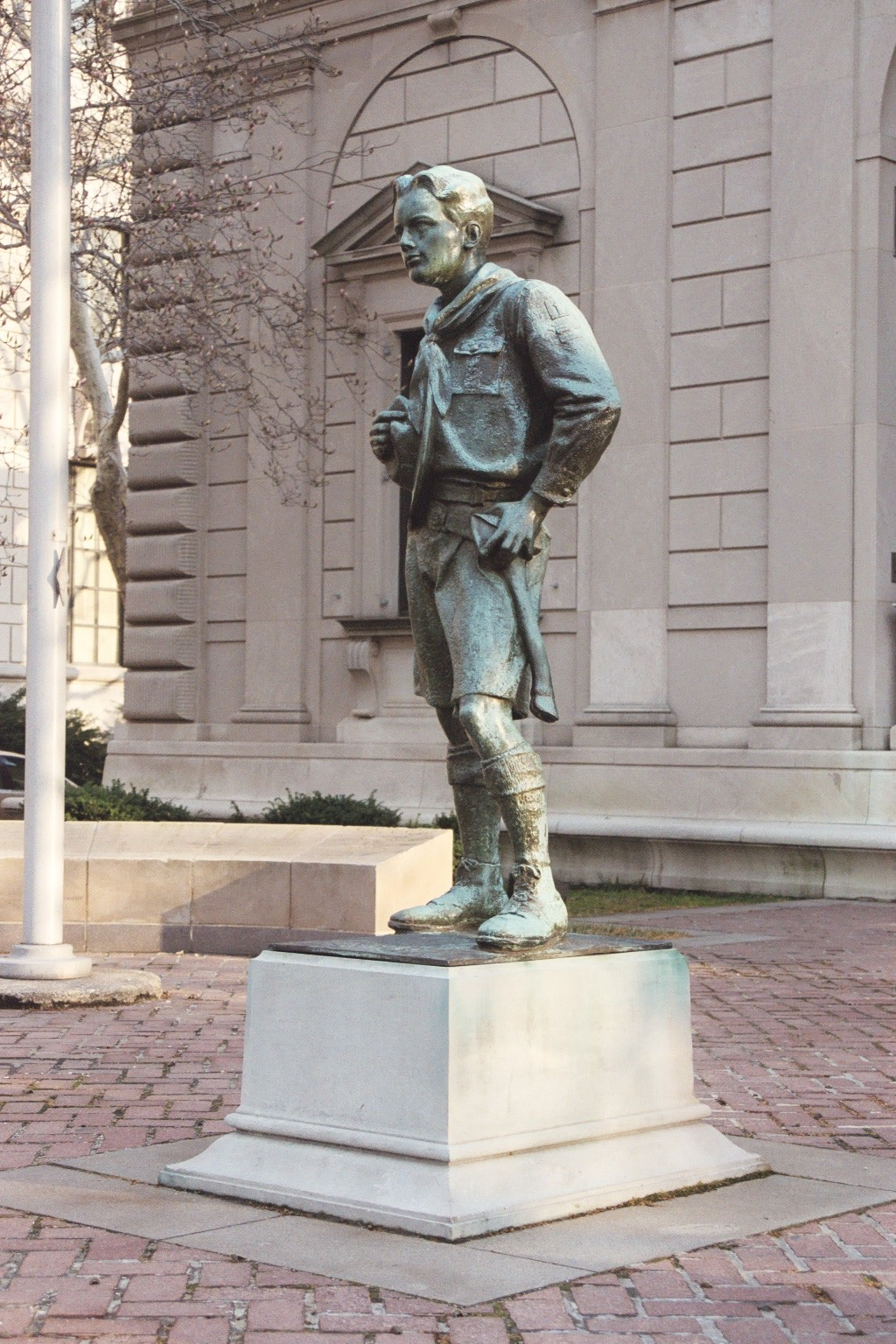
The Ideal Scout

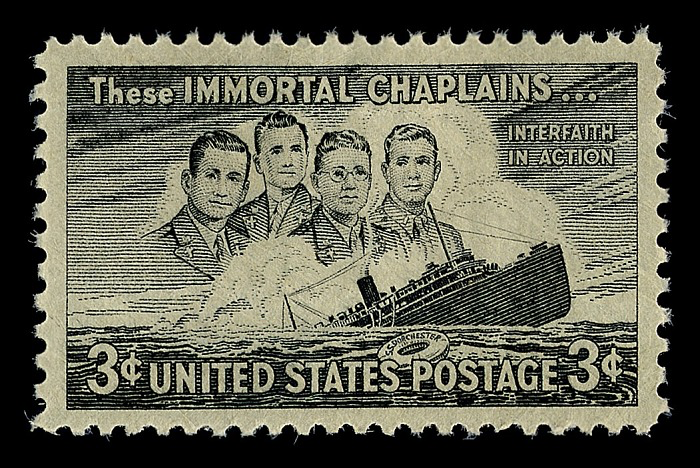
Four Chaplains

These notable individuals were in the Boy Scouts of America (BSA). Also see the lists of Eagle Scouts, Recipients of the Silver Buffalo Award, Chief Scout Executives, National presidents of the Boy Scouts of America and National Commissioner.

Name	Notability	References
Barack Obama	44th President of the United States	
Buzz Aldrin	Astronaut; Tenderfoot Scout	
Jack Andraka	Life Scout who developed a test for cancer at age 15	
Ezra Taft Benson	National Executive Board Member, Boy Scouts of America; US Secretary of Agriculture; President of the Church of Jesus Christ of Latter-day Saints; recipient of the Bronze Wolf Award	
Jack Black	Cub Scout in Los Angeles	
Ernest Borgnine	Film and television actor	
William D. Boyce	Entrepreneur; newspaper publisher; philanthropist; safari explorer; founder of the Boy Scouts of America and the Lone Scouts of America	
George W. Bush	43rd U.S. President; Cub Scout	
Calvin Coolidge, Jr.	Son of President Calvin Coolidge; with his brother, he was the first Scout to live in the White House.	
Walter Cronkite	Broadcast journalist	
John Hope Franklin	Boy Scout; historian, author of From Slavery to Freedom; recipient of the Presidential Medal of Freedom	
Bill Gates	Life Scout, founder of Microsoft	
Alexander D. Goode	Scout leader, Rabbi, Army Chaplain, one of the Four Chaplains who died when the troop transport Dorchester was torpedoed during World War II	
Byron Hill	Nashville songwriter; Life Scout	
William Hillcourt (Green Bar Bill)	Boy Scout; Scoutmaster; Scouting professional who served in various positions in the Boy Scouts of America; authored many books and articles on Scouting, outdoor activities, and Scout skills, including the first Scout Fieldbook and three editions of the Boy Scout Handbook of the BSA; trainee at the first Wood Badge course in the USA, 1936 and served as Senior Patrol Leader at the second course some days later; organized Wood Badge as a regular BSA program in 1948, serving as the first Course Leader; recipient of the Bronze Wolf Award	
Frank Reed Horton	Deputy Scout Commissioner, Easton Scout Council, Pennsylvania; Scout Executive, Homestead District Council, Pennsylvania; Scout Executive, Shenandoah Area Council, Winchester, Virginia; founder, Alpha Phi Omega	
John Isley	host of The John Boy & Billy Big Show	
John F. Kennedy	Star Scout; 35th President of the United States	
Martin Luther King Jr.	Boy Scout; civil rights activist	
Tommy Lasorda	Manager of two LA Dodgers World Series champion teams; member of National Baseball Hall of Fame	
Richard 'Cheech' Marin	Cub Scout, Boy Scout, American stand-up comedian, actor, voice actor, writer	
Ross A. McGinnis	Cub Scout, Boy Scout, awarded Medal of Honor in the Iraq War	
Jim Morrison	Cub Scout	
Clark V. Poling	Scout leader; Dutch Reformed minister; Army Chaplain; one of the Four Chaplains who died when the troop transport Dorchester was torpedoed during World War II	
Slater Rhea	Singer and TV personality in China; Eagle Scout and Scouter in Far East Council and Direct Service Council	
Ernest Thompson Seton	British-Canadian-American naturalist, outdoor artist, conservationist; founded the Woodcraft Indians and the Woodcraft League; inspiration and major source of Baden-Powell's Scouting for Boys; co-founder of the Boy Scouts of America and the Camp Fire Girls; Chief Scout of the Boy Scouts of America; recipient of the Silver Buffalo Award	
Alan K. Simpson	Scout, U.S. Senator from Wyoming	
John Victor Skiff	Scout, Scoutmaster, New York State environmental conservationist and public servant.	
George Takei	Actor, community leader, civil rights activist	
Teller	Entertainer, Cub Scout	
George Thorogood	Cub Scout in Delaware	
Robert Wadlow	World's tallest Boy Scout	
Jimmy Buffett	Singer, Songwriter. Boy Scout, St. Ignatius Parish in Mobile	
Chris Pratt	Actor. Scout	
Dan Reynolds	Lead singer for Imagine Dragons. Eagle Scout	
James Valentine	Guitarist for Maroon 5. Grammy Winner. Eagle Scout	
Harrison Ford	Actor. Life Scout, Napowan Adventure Base Scout Camp counselor	
George Strait	Singer. Boy Scout.	
John P. Washington	Scout leader, Catholic priest, Army Chaplain, one of the Four Chaplains who died when the troop transport Dorchester was torpedoed during World War II	

===== Honorary Scouts =====
In 1911, President William Howard Taft accepted the position of honorary president of the BSA, and each U.S. president since has served. Theodore Roosevelt was the only honorary vice-president, as he had left office before the honorary presidency began.

In 1927, the Boy Scouts of America created Honorary Scouts to distinguish "American citizens whose achievements in outdoor activity, exploration and worthwhile adventure are of such an exceptional character as to capture the imagination of boys...". The eighteen who were awarded this distinction were:

Name	Notability	References
Roy Chapman Andrews	Explorer, adventurer and naturalist; director of the American Museum of Natural History	
Robert Bartlett	Newfoundland navigator and Arctic explorer of the late 19th and early 20th centuries	
Frederick Russell Burnham	Military scout and world traveling adventurer; served the British Army in colonial Africa; taught woodcraft to Robert Baden-Powell	
Richard E. Byrd	Rear admiral, polar explorer, aviator and recipient of the Medal of Honor	
George Kruck Cherrie	Naturalist and explorer of the American Museum of Natural History	
James L. Clark	Explorer and scientist of the American Museum of Natural History	
Merian C. Cooper	American aviator and adventurer, Polish Air Force officer in the 1920s; later U.S. Army Forces brigadier general; director, screenwriter, producer and actor; credits include King Kong	
Lincoln Ellsworth	Arctic explorer	
Louis Agassiz Fuertes	Ornithologist, illustrator and artist	
George Bird Grinnell	Anthropologist, historian, naturalist, and writer; influenced public opinion and legislation which ultimately led to the preservation of the American buffalo	
Charles Lindbergh	Aviator, author, inventor and explorer	
Donald B. MacMillan	Arctic explorer, sailor and researcher	
Clifford H. Pope	Herpetologist and explorer	
George P. Putnam	Publisher, author and explorer	
Kermit Roosevelt	Explorer, soldier who served with both the British and U.S. Armies, businessman and writer	
Carl Rungius	Wildlife artist	
Stewart Edward White	Author of adventure travel books	
Orville Wright	Co-inventor of the world's first successful airplane	

===== Puerto Rico =====
Name	Notability	References
Luis Matias Ferrer	Co-founder of Yokahu Lodge, Order of the Arrow	
Frank H. Wadsworth	Co-founder of Yokahu Lodge, Order of the Arrow	

== Oceania ==
=== Australia ===
Name	Notability	References
Kieran Ault-Connell	Paralympic athlete	
Geoffrey Blainey	historian	
Sir Jack Brabham	racing driver	
Keith Conlon	television and radio presenter	
Jamie Durie	television host	
Peter Garrett	MP - Minister of Environment, Heritage and The Arts and musician	
Regan Harrison	Olympic swimmer	
Jack Heath	author	
Robert Irwin	television personality and wildlife conservationist	
Shane Jacobson	comedian	
Jacob Zhou	Scout	
Tim Jarvis	explorer and adventurer	
Brendan Nelson	MP - Former Federal Defence Minister	
Dave O'Neil	talkback radio host	
Clement Roy Nichols	Served on the World Scout Committee from 1959 to 1965 and again from 1967 to 1973. Recipient, Bronze Wolf, 1965.	
David Parkin	Australian rules footballer and coach	
Helen Sham-Ho	member, NSW Legislative Council	
Dick Smith	businessman and aviator	
Adam Spencer	radio DJ and media personality	
Jack Yabsley	television presenter	

=== New Zealand ===
Name / Notability / References; Eileen Louise Soper / journalist and Girl Guides commissioner

== See also ==
- List of Alpha Phi Omega members
