= King's Scout Award =

King's Scout can refer to several ranks in Scout organizations around the world:

- King Scout, the highest rank in the National Scout Organization of Thailand
- Pengakap Raja, the highest rank in the Persekutuan Pengakap Malaysia
- King's Scout is the highest rank in many Commonwealth countries; termed Queen's Scout during the reign of a female monarch of the Commonwealth realms

== See also ==
- List of highest awards in Scouting
- Crown Scout
- President's Award (disambiguation)
