= King's Scout (Scouts Association of Malaysia) =

Highest award of the Scouts programme in Malaysia

- Other name: Pengakap Raja ڤڠاکڤ راج 皇家童军 ராஜாவின் சாரணர்கள்
- Country: Malaysia
- Founder: Scouts Association of Malaysia
- Owner: Scouts Association of Malaysia
- Recipients: ~10,000 (1954–2026)
- Awarded to: Scout members who achieve the highest rank in the Malaysian Scouting movement
- Issuer of the Royal Certificate: Scouts Association of Malaysia
- Signatories to the Royal Certificate: Yang di-Pertuan Agong and the nine hereditary Malay State Rulers
- Evaluator: King's Scout Evaluation Council

King's Scout (Malay: Pengakap Raja), (Note: Jawi: ڤڠاکڤ راج Mandarin: 皇家童军 Tamil: ராஜாவின் சாரணர்கள்) also known as King's Scout Award (Malay: Anugerah Pengakap Raja), is the highest award of the Scouts Association of Malaysia (PPM). For many Malaysians, this award represents the highest pinnacle of achievement and the ultimate milestone for youth members before adulthood. The award recognizes recipients who demonstrate exceptional leadership, self-reliance, community service, and the successful completion of rigorous outdoor survival training. A unique and prestigious attribute of the Malaysian King's Scout Certificate is its status as an official royal certificate featuring 10 constitutional signatures. (Note: The certificate is co-signed by His Majesty the Yang di-Pertuan Agong (the King and Supreme Head of the Federation of Malaysia), alongside the nine hereditary State Sultans and Rulers who serve as the individual Heads of State for Malaysia's royal states.)

To qualify for this award, a Scout candidate must earn specific badges and successfully navigate a rigorous evaluation process. Once these prerequisite badges are documented in their official logbooks, candidates undergo a rigorous pre-rating evaluation camp followed by a final national standardization assessment camp, where they are tested on advanced campcraft, leadership, survival skills, and community service. The King's Scout award in Malaysia is a prestigious honor featuring a certificate signed by the King and the nine state Sultans, with fewer than 0.3% of Scouts (approximately 10,000 individuals) achieved this honor between 1954 and 2026. Historically rooted in the British system, the award was formalized in 1954 and is administered by the Scouts Association of Malaysia under a Parliamentary Act.

The King's Scout Award is structurally equivalent to the top awards of other international scouting organizations. These include the Eagle Scout in the United States and Philippines, the King's Scout in the United Kingdom, Australia and New Zealand, the Dragon Scout in Hong Kong, the President's Scout in Singapore, the Pramuka Garuda in Indonesia, the Tiger Scout in South Korea, the Fuji Scout in Japan, the Crown Scout in Belgium and the Netherlands, the King's Scout in Thailand, and the King's Venturer Award in Canada, among many others.

== Terminology ==
The correct name for this award in Malaysia is King's Scout (Malay: Pengakap Raja) and not Royal Scout (Malay: Pengakap Diraja or Pengakap DiRaja).

== History ==
In 1909, King Edward VII granted Robert Baden-Powell's appeal for boys who completed specific efficiency tests to be designated as "King's Scouts." A badge featuring a crown represented the honor of being a King's Scout. Following the creation of the Senior Scout section in 1946, only Senior Scouts (or Boy Scouts aged over 15) were eligible to achieve this rank. After the succession of Queen Elizabeth II in 1952, the honor was rebranded as "Queen's Scout" in 1953. A King's Scout certificate from that era featured the Royal Crest at the top and was signed by King George V. The statement on it reads:

"As a King's Scout you have prepared yourself for service to God and your fellow-men, and have shown yourself a worthy member of the great SCOUT BROTHERHOOD. I wish you God-speed on your journey through life; may it prove for you a joyous adventure."

Scouting arrived in Malaya around 1908, starting in Penang and spreading across the Malay states through schools over the next two decades. Following the ascension of Queen Elizabeth II, the award was temporarily styled as the Queen's Scout Award, with structured registration records in Malaya dating actively from 1954 onward. After Malayan independence and the subsequent formation of Malaysia, the award transitioned to reflect national sovereignty. It was formally adapted as the King's Scout Award (Malay: Anugerah Pengakap Raja) under the Scouts Association of Malaysia. Attaining this award remains exceptionally rare; it has historically been achieved by a tiny fraction of registered youth scouts, equating to fewer than 0.3% or roughly 10,000 recipients from 1954 until 2026. Recipients continue to be formally honored at state palaces by Malaysia’s royal figures, maintaining the award's deep connection to the nation's royal heritage. Nowadays, the King's Scout Certificate, issued by the Scouts Association of Malaysia Headquarters, is awarded by the state Sultan or Governor on behalf of His Majesty the Yang di-Pertuan Agong of Malaysia, the Royal Patron of the association. This certificate stands out because it bears 10 signatures, led by His Majesty the Yang di-Pertuan Agong and the Sultans of the nine royal states.

== Eligibility process ==
=== Badge progression and logbook checks ===
To qualify for the King's Scout rank, a candidate must systematically complete a comprehensive badge progression scheme spanning both the Junior Scout (Malay: Pengakap Muda) and Senior Scout (Malay: Pengakap Remaja) levels. Candidates are required to thoroughly document all acquired knowledge, technical skills, and field evidence in dedicated physical logbooks.

[Completed Logbooks] ──> [Stage 1: District Council Vetting] ──> [Stage 2: State Council Final Vetting] ──> [Approval or Rejection]

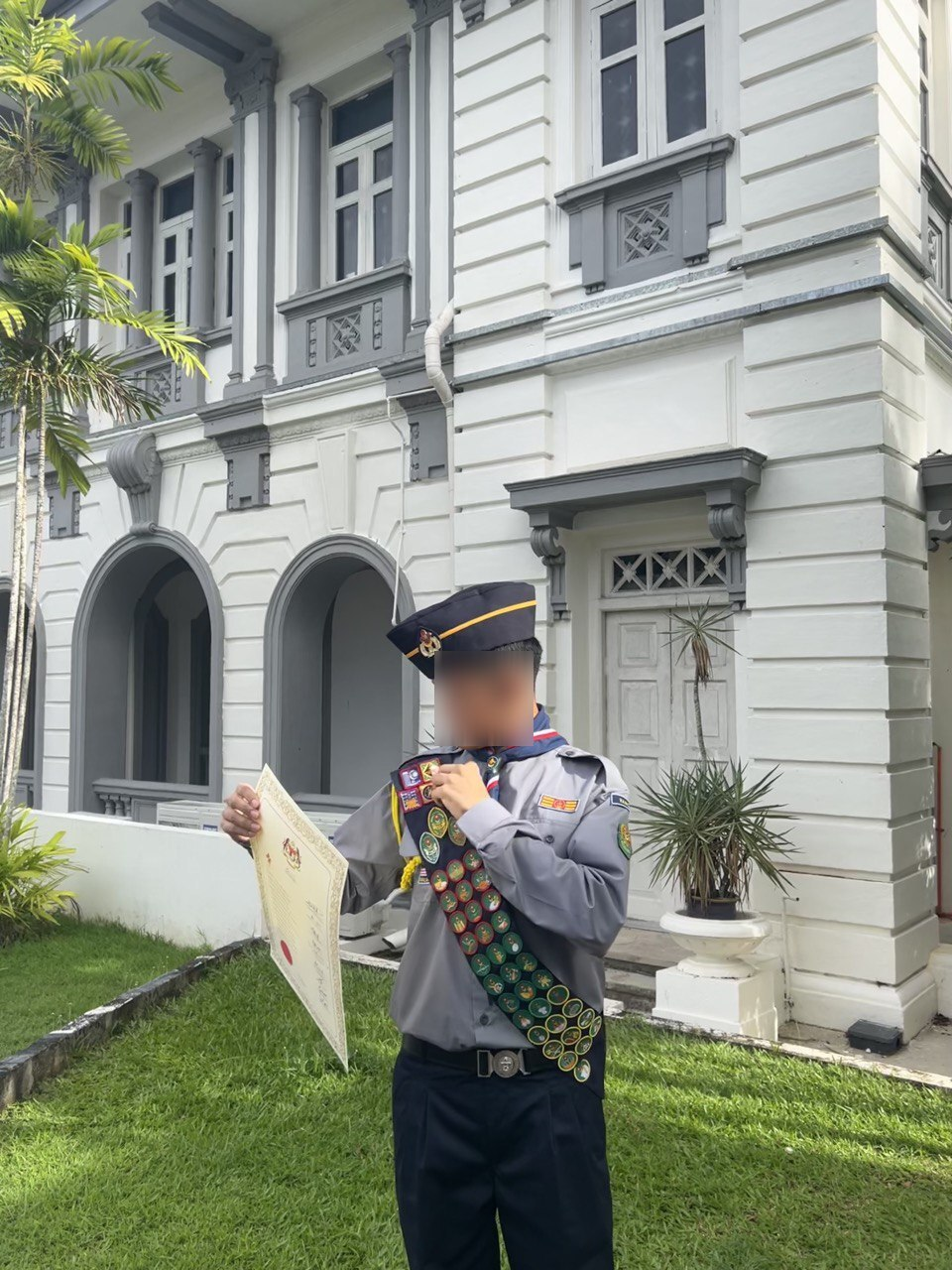
A Malaysian King's Scout stands proudly in full grey uniform and a dark forage cap on a lush green lawn, presenting his official Royal Certificate while wearing a sash heavily decorated with merit badges.

Before a candidate can be cleared to attend the national assessment camp, their accumulated logbooks must pass a strict, two-tiered institutional evaluation:

1. Stage 1: District Council Vetting (Malay: Pemeriksaan Peringkat Daerah): The initial structural audit is conducted by the local District Scout Vetting Council. Evaluators inspect the logbooks for completeness, required activity signatures, and adherence to baseline syllabus requirements.
2. Stage 2: State Council Final Vetting (Malay: Pemeriksaan Peringkat Negeri): Logbooks that pass the district level are forwarded to the State Scout Vetting Council for final determination. The State Council acts as the definitive regulatory authority with the power to officially qualify or reject a candidate's submission.

Since 2010s, the evaluation standards implemented by State Councils have become significantly more stringent. Vetting panels enforce strict compliance regarding accuracy, technical presentation, and the authenticity of fieldwork evidence. If a candidate's logbooks fail to meet these elevated quality benchmarks, the submission is definitively rejected, rendering the candidate ineligible to advance to the King's Scout Standard Assessment Camp.

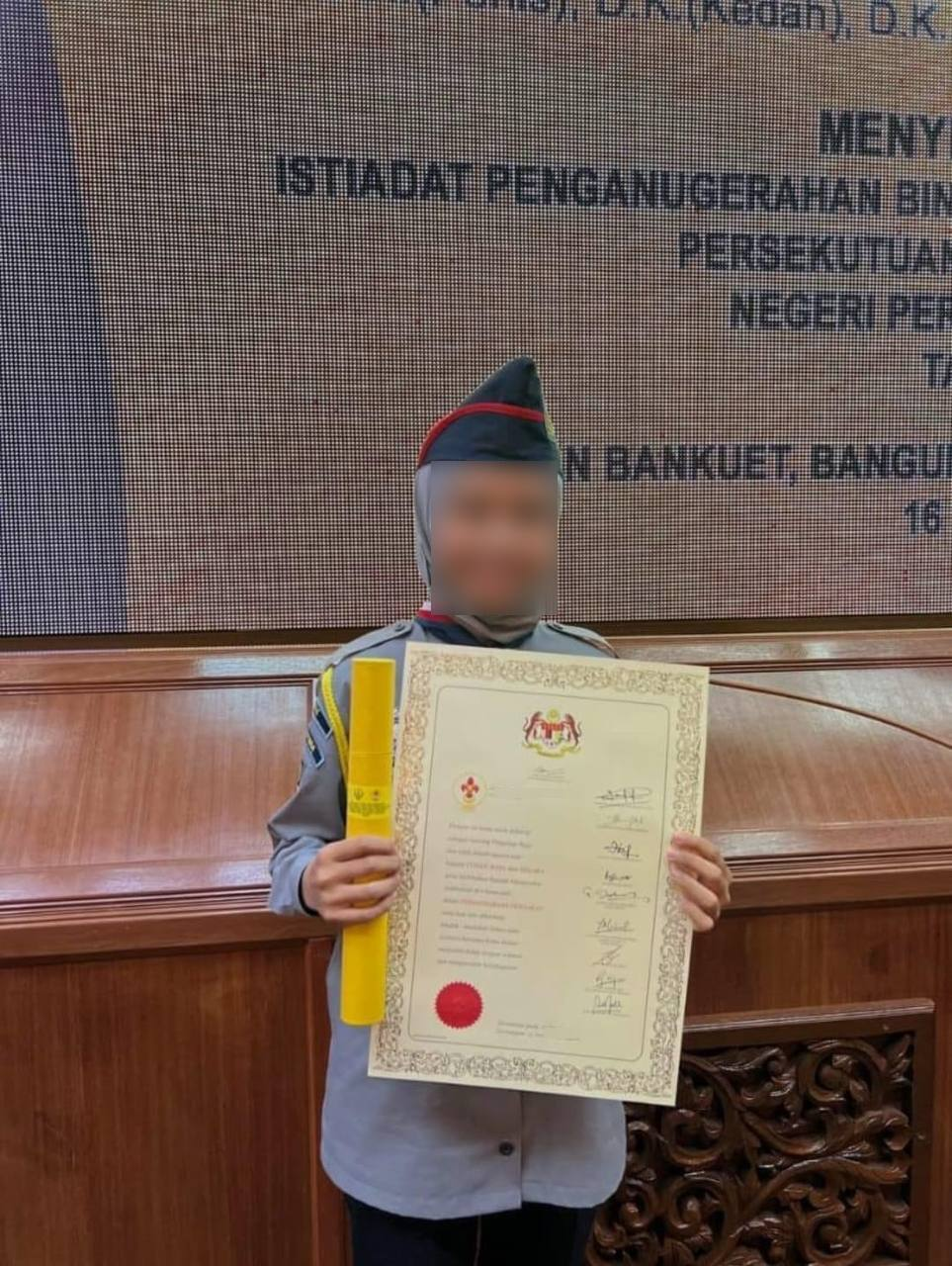
A Malaysian King's Scout stands proudly holding her official Royal Certificate and yellow scroll in a wood-paneled banquet hall during an official royal award ceremony.

=== King's Scout Pre-Rating Test Camp ===
Before advancing to the final national evaluation, qualified candidates must undergo the King's Scout Pre-Rating Test Camp, also known as the King's Scout Code of Conduct Examination (Malay: Ujian Sikap Pengakap Raja or USPR). This stage serves as a crucial state- or district-level screening mechanism to ensure that only top-tier candidates proceed to the national board.

The evaluation is conducted during a mandatory four-day, three-night intensive residential camp organized by either the District King's Scout Evaluation Council or the State Council. Throughout the camp, participants are divided into cohorts, where their candidate documentation, group tests, and practical campcraft skills are thoroughly audited by examiners. Group-based assessments include Interview A, Campcraft, Orienteering, Marching, a 12 km Hike, and a Forum. Additionally, all candidates are required to complete a King's Scout Pre-Rating Test Camp logbook and submit it during the evaluation camp.

Key aspects participants will be evaluated on:

1. Responsibility,
2. Expedition,
3. Community Service,
4. Activities and;
5. Independent.

Successful completion of the Pre-Rating Test Camp marks a definitive milestone in a Malaysian scout's progression. Upon passing, the candidate is formally authorized to wear the Senior Scout Cord (Malay: Rambu Pengakap Remaja), which is alternatively recognized within the national framework as the National Chief Scout's Award.

This distinguished cord is royal yellow and is worn over the left shoulder. Earning the yellow cord officially signifies that the candidate has completed all prerequisite structural training and is fully qualified to advance to the final King's Scout Standard Assessment Camp.

=== King's Scout Rating Test Camp ===
The final hurdle in the advancement pathway is the King's Scout Standard Assessment Camp (Malay: Kem Penarafan Pengakap Raja). This intensive five-day, four-night residential evaluation is organized and executed under the direct jurisdiction of the respective State King's Scout Evaluation Council.

Upon successfully passing all required tests, candidates are authorized to wear this hand-braided Bushman's Thong, which is subsequently worn during their official King's Scout Certificate Award Ceremony. Once the evaluation concludes, candidates are notified by the State King's Scout Evaluation Council through their school's scout leaders regarding their pass or fail status.

== Eligibility requirements ==
Before being awarded the King's Scout Badge and Certificate, a Senior Scout shall meet the following requirements:

1. Have been a registered Scout member for at least three consecutive years prior to applying for the King's Scout Pre-Rating Test Camp. All candidates are required to submit their scouting membership cards for verification before the camp. (Note: Most King's Scout candidates begin their scouting journeys in Standard 4 (at the primary school level) or Form 1 (at the secondary school level).)
2. Have successfully earned all prerequisite badges, spanning from the Membership Badge and the Pengakap Muda Advancement Badges (Usaha, Maju, and Jaya, along with two Proficiency Badges, three Knowledge Badges, and three Service Badges) to the Lencana Tertinggi (Jayadiri, Kemahiran, Kegiatan, Ekspedisi, and Perkhidmatan Badges) and hold the Senior Scout Cord (National Chief Scout's Award) and have passed both the King's Scout Pre-Rating Test Camp administered by the District King's Scout Evaluation Council and the King's Scout Standard Assessment Camp administered by the State King's Scout Evaluation Council.
3. Hold the Senior Scout Cord (National Chief Scout's Award) and be at least 17 years old at the time of applying for the King's Scout Standard Assessment Camp.
4. Have completed and passed the official logbook evaluations conducted by both the District and State King's Scout Evaluation Councils, ensuring all training records and fieldwork evidence are comprehensively documented within the candidate's logbooks.
5. Be recognized as possessing advanced scouting skills and a strong commitment to practicing those skills for the benefit of the community.
6. Be certified by the National Chief Scout Commissioner as a well-behaved individual who embodies the core values of scouting and serves as an exemplary role model.

These candidates also have to fulfill any additional criteria or specialized conditions dictated by the specific eligibility requirements of their respective districts and states within Malaysia.

== Award ceremonies, badges and certificates ==
=== King's Scout Certificate Award Ceremonies ===
Upon successfully passing the King's Scout Standard Assessment Camp, candidates are awarded their Bushman's Thong alongside the iconic greenish-yellow King's Scout badge, followed by an invitation to an official state investiture ceremony to receive their certificates. Rather than hosting immediate individual ceremonies each year, State Scout Councils typically hold successful candidates' certificates over a period of time, retaining the credentials until a complete cohort or batch is finalized for a collective ceremony.

The venue and format of these investitures vary significantly by state. In monarchical states, ceremonies are traditionally held at a State Royal Palace, such as Kedah's Istana Anak Bukit or Terengganu's Istana Maziah. Alternatively, states may utilize major government or civic halls, such as Selangor's Dewan Jubli Perak or Perak's Dewan Bankuet. While palace-hosted investitures have become less frequent in recent years, the certificate continues to be conferred by the respective Sultan or Governor (Malay: Yang di-Pertua Negeri) on behalf of His Majesty the Yang di-Pertuan Agong, the Royal Patron of the Scouts Association of Malaysia (Malay: Persekutuan Pengakap Malaysia or PPM). In recent years, the most frequent and active investitures have been consistently organized by the states of Perak and Penang, alongside the Federal Territory of Kuala Lumpur.

=== King's Scout Badge ===
Once a candidate is officially awarded the King's Scout rank, they receive the King's Scout Badge—featuring a distinctive yellow, blue, and green color scheme—which is worn on the left sleeve of the uniform. This badge is issued exclusively by the Scouts Association of Malaysia (PPM) and cannot be replicated or misused by unauthorized individuals.

=== King's Scout Certificate ===
Dengan ini kamu telah diiktiraf sebagai seorang Pangakap Raja dan telah dilatih supaya taat kepada TUHAN, RAJA dan NEGARA serta berkhidmat kepada Masyarakat. Jadikanlah diri kamu ahli dalam PERSAUDARAAN PENGAKAP yang luas dan dihormati. Mudah - mudahan Tuhan akan sentiasa bersama kamu dalam menjalani hidup dengan selamat dan memperolehi kebahagiaan. (Note: Translated as "With this you have been recognized as a King's Scout and have been trained to obey GOD, KING and NATION as well as serve the Community. Become a member of a broad and respected SCOUT BROTHERHOOD. Hopefully God will always be with you in living a safe and happy life.")

— The King's Scout Royal Certificate

The King's Scout Certificate, also recognized as the King's Scout Royal Certificate, is issued by PPM Headquarters and presented by the state Sultan or Governor on behalf of His Majesty the Yang di-Pertuan Agong, the Royal Patron of the Scouts Association of Malaysia. This certificate stands out globally because it bears 10 constitutional signatures, led by the incumbent Yang di-Pertuan Agong and the nine hereditary Sultans of the royal states. To date, this remains a uniquely prestigious credential with no equivalent in other youth activities or frameworks in Malaysia.

== Advantages and distinctions ==
Holding the rank of King's Scout offers an advantage when applying for higher education or specific careers, as it demonstrates high personal resilience, independence, leadership, integrity, and a spirit of community service. According to the guidelines of the Scouts Association of Malaysia (PPM), recipients of the King's Scout Award earn the highest co-curricular merit points at the national level. Regarding admission to public universities in Malaysia, the Ministry of Higher Education (KPT) manages entry via the UPUOnline system using a formula comprising 90% academic performance and 10% co-curricular achievement. King's Scouts automatically secure the maximum 10 points for the co-curricular component, providing a significant advantage in the highly competitive selection process for sought-after programs such as Medicine, Engineering, or Law. This award is also recognized across Commonwealth countries as a premier youth achievement.

Universities and employers are aware that a King's Scout must undergo a process to earn the title; candidates are required to face a five-day, four-night King's Scout Attitude Test, undertake a 40km hiking expedition, accumulate over 20 days of jungle camping experience, and complete dozens of logbooks as well as hundreds of hours of community service. Sponsoring bodies such as the Public Service Department (JPA), Majlis Amanah Rakyat (MARA), Yayasan Khazanah, and Yayasan Petronas value candidates who possess leadership qualities—such as the King's Scout—over those who excel academically.

This award is highly esteemed and prioritized when applying for positions in the government sector, particularly within uniformed bodies such as the Malaysian Armed Forces (ATM), the Royal Malaysia Police (PDRM), and the Fire and Rescue Department of Malaysia (JBPM). Certified by a certificate signed by the Yang di-Pertuan Agong and the nine State Sultans, the award carries significant added value ("X-factor") before job interview panels (especially the Public Service Commission, or SPA). It ultimately serves as tangible proof of the applicant's character and credibility.

== After achieving the rank of King's Scout ==
The King's Scouts are expected to set an example for other scouts and to transition into lifelong leaders, fulfilling the potential they demonstrated during their youth training. Upon achieving this rank, they are eligible to join the King's Scout Brotherhood of Malaysia and the Association of Top Achiever Scouts (ATAS).

=== King's Scout Brotherhood of Malaysia ===
After being officially recognized as a King's Scout, a recipient can register as a member of the King's Scout Brotherhood of Malaysia (Malay: Persaudaraan Pengakap Raja Malaysia or PPRM) and receive the brotherhood badge.

=== Association of Top Achiever Scouts ===
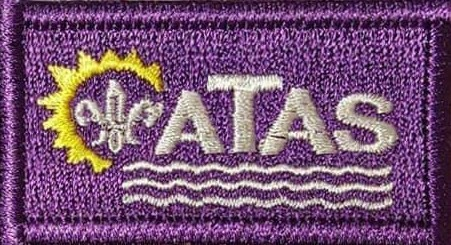
Association of Top Achiever Scouts (ATAS) badge.

Furthermore, recipients of the King's Scout Award are eligible to apply for membership in the Association of Top Achiever Scouts (ATAS) (Malay: Persatuan Pengakap Berprestasi Tinggi) and obtain the ATAS badge. This badge is worn on the left sleeve of the uniform, positioned directly below the King's Scout Badge.

Within the Scouts Association of Malaysia, a member must earn at least one of the following highest advancement awards to qualify for the ATAS badge:

1. King's Scout Award (for the Senior Scout stage) or;
2. Baden-Powell Award (for the Rover Scout stage).

== Awards ==
The King's Scout Brotherhood of Malaysia (Malay: Persaudaraan Pengakap Raja Malaysia or PPRM) has established a series of awards to honor King's Scouts who have demonstrated exceptional service and dedication to their communities, society, and the nation. This initiative was inspired in 2016 by the National Chief Scout of Malaysia, Major General (Rtd.) Professor Datuk Dr. Haji Mohd Zin Bidin, who is also a King's Scout. These awards were officially gazetted on 1 January 2023 and comprise six distinct commendations:

1. The Hornbill Award (Malay: Anugerah Kenyalang)
2. The Silver Malayan Tiger Award (Malay: Anugerah Harimau Malaya Perak)
3. The Bronze Malayan Tiger Award (Malay: Anugerah Harimau Malaya Gangsa)
4. Good Service Award (Malay: Anugerah Perkhidmatan Baik)
5. Long Service Award (Malay: Anugerah Perkhidmatan Lama)
  1. 15 Years
  2. 10 Years
  3. 5 Years
6. Certificate of Commendable Service (Malay: Sijil Khidmat Terpuji)

Notable recipients of these honors include Major General (Rtd.) Professor Datuk Dr. Haji Mohd Zin Bidin, current acting Malaysian National Chief Scout; Dato' Syed Ahmad Idid Syed Abdullah, a former Malaysian High Court judge; and Eric Khoo Heng-Pheng, a former member of the World Scout Committee, all of whom were presented with the Bronze Malayan Tiger Award. (Note: Eric Khoo Heng-Pheng was awarded posthumously.)

== Notable recipients ==
According to records from the Malacca State Branch of the Scouts Association of Malaysia, nearly 10,000 recipients of the King's Scout Award have been registered by the Scouts Association of Malaysia Headquarters from 1954 until 2026. Furthermore, data from Malaysia4U indicates that only 0.3% of all registered youth scout members on record successfully attained the King's Scout Award from its inception in 1954 through 2020.

Notable King's Scout Award recipients include:

- Shamsul Iskandar Md. Akin – former Malaysian Deputy Minister of Primary Industries (2018–2020) and Member of the House of Representatives for Bukit Katil (2013–2018) & Hang Tuah Jaya (2018–2022).
- Syed Ahmad Idid bin Syed Abdullah – former Malaysian High Court judge (1990–1996).
- Eric Khoo Heng-Pheng – former Member of the World Scout Committee, former Chairman of the Asia Pacific Regional Scout Committee and former Assistant National Chief Commissioner of the Scouts Association of Malaysia.
- Pkharuddin Ghazali – former Malaysian Director-General of Education (2022–2023).
- Mohd Zin bin Bidin – current Malaysian National Chief Scout (since 2023), former Malaysian National Chief Scout Commissioner (2016–2024), founding Dean of the Faculty of Medicine, National Defense University of Malaysia and former Vice-Chancellor of Widad University College (formerly known as University College Shahputra).

== See also ==
- List of highest scouting awards by country
