= List of ambassadors of Morocco to Saudi Arabia =

Coordinates: 24.680238°N 46.622105°E

Ambassador of Morocco to Saudi Arabia
- Incumbent; Mustapha Mansouri since November 26, 2014
- Inaugural holder: Fquih Mohammed Ghazi
- Formation: April 27, 1957

The Moroccan ambassador in Riyadh is the official representative of the Government in Rabat to the Government of Saudi Arabia.

== List of representatives ==
Diplomatic accreditation	Ambassador	Arabic	Observations	List of rulers of Morocco	King of Saudi Arabia	term end
April 27, 1957	Fquih Mohammed Ghazi	Arabic: الفقيه محمد غازي		Mohammed V of Morocco	Saud of Saudi Arabia	December 31, 1961
December 31, 1961	Fatmi Benslimane	Arabic: السيد الفاطمي بنسليمان		Hassan II of Morocco	Saud of Saudi Arabia	October 23, 1968
October 23, 1968	Abderrahmane Baddou	Arabic: السيد عبد الرحمان بادو		Hassan II of Morocco	Faisal of Saudi Arabia	July 11, 1971
July 11, 1971	Dey Ould Sidi Baba	Arabic: السيد الداي ولد سيدي بابا		Hassan II of Morocco	Faisal of Saudi Arabia	December 31, 1972
January 1, 1972	Abderrahmane Baddou	Arabic: السيد عبد الرحمان بادو		Hassan II of Morocco	Faisal of Saudi Arabia	December 31, 1975
January 1, 1976	Mahmoud el-Alamy	Arabic: السيد محمد العلمي		Hassan II of Morocco	Khalid of Saudi Arabia	December 31, 1976
January 1, 1982	Moulay Zine Alaoui	Arabic: مولآي الزين العلوي		Hassan II of Morocco	Fahd of Saudi Arabia	December 31, 1986
January 1, 1988	Ahmad Ramzi	Arabic: آلدكتور أحمد رمزي		Hassan II of Morocco	Fahd of Saudi Arabia	December 31, 1988
January 1, 1993	Mohamed Tazi	Arabic: السيد محمد التازي		Hassan II of Morocco	Fahd of Saudi Arabia	December 31, 1994
January 1, 1995	Hassan Abouyoub	Arabic: السيد حسن أبو أيوب		Hassan II of Morocco	Fahd of Saudi Arabia	December 31, 1995
January 1, 1996	Abdelkarim Semmar	Arabic: السيد عبد الكريم السمار		Hassan II of Morocco	Fahd of Saudi Arabia	September 1, 2009
September 1, 2009	Ibrahim Ajoli	Arabic: براهيم اجولي	Chargé d'affaires	Mohammed VI of Morocco	Abdullah of Saudi Arabia	March 9, 2013
March 9, 2013	Abdeslam Baraka	Arabic: عبد السلام بركة		Mohammed VI of Morocco	Abdullah of Saudi Arabia	November 26, 2014
November 26, 2014	Mustapha Mansouri	Arabic: مصطفى المنصوري		Mohammed VI of Morocco	Abdullah of Saudi Arabia	
