= National Eagle Scouts Association of the Philippines =

- Type: Association
- Affiliations: Eagle Scouts

The National Eagle Scouts Association of the Philippines (NESAPh) is an honor society of Eagle Scouts in the Philippines. It is a voluntary, non-political, non-sectarian and non-profit association of Eagle Scouts supporting the causes of scouting and the thrusts of the Boy Scouts of the Philippines.

== History ==
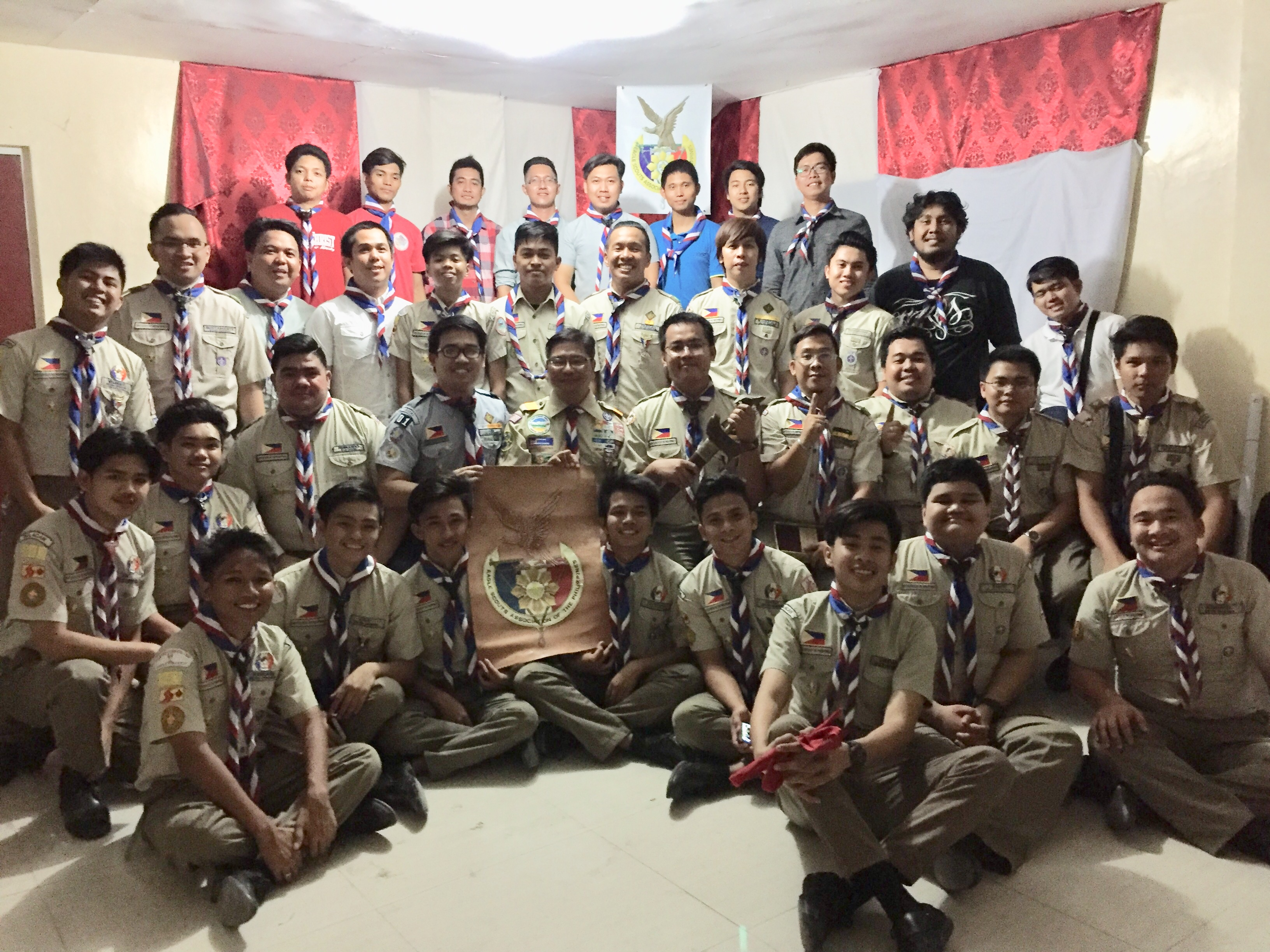
NESAPh First Acceptance Rites in Bulacan, February 24, 2018

Motivated by the necessity to establish a unifying service organization for like-minded Eagle Scouts in Bulacan, Bro. Paolo R. Cruz sought the assistance and guidance of Bro. Karl Lyel B. Lim in organizing ceremonies for a new Brotherhood of Eagle Scouts. The inaugural ceremony, inspired by various organizations' ideals, practices, and traditions, took place in Calumpit, Bulacan, on 24 February 2018, resulting in the formation of the initial batch of thirty-four members.

Four days later, Bro. Paolo Cruz proposed the name "National Eagle Scouts Association of the Philippines" or NESAPh, designating it as the Premiere Honor Society of Eagle Scouts in the country.

From March 14-29, 2018, Bro. Lyel and Bro. Paolo collaborated on a new guide and script for admitting new members, eventually named the NESAPh Acceptance Rites. On March 22, 2018, Bro. Lyel finalized NESAPh's logo.

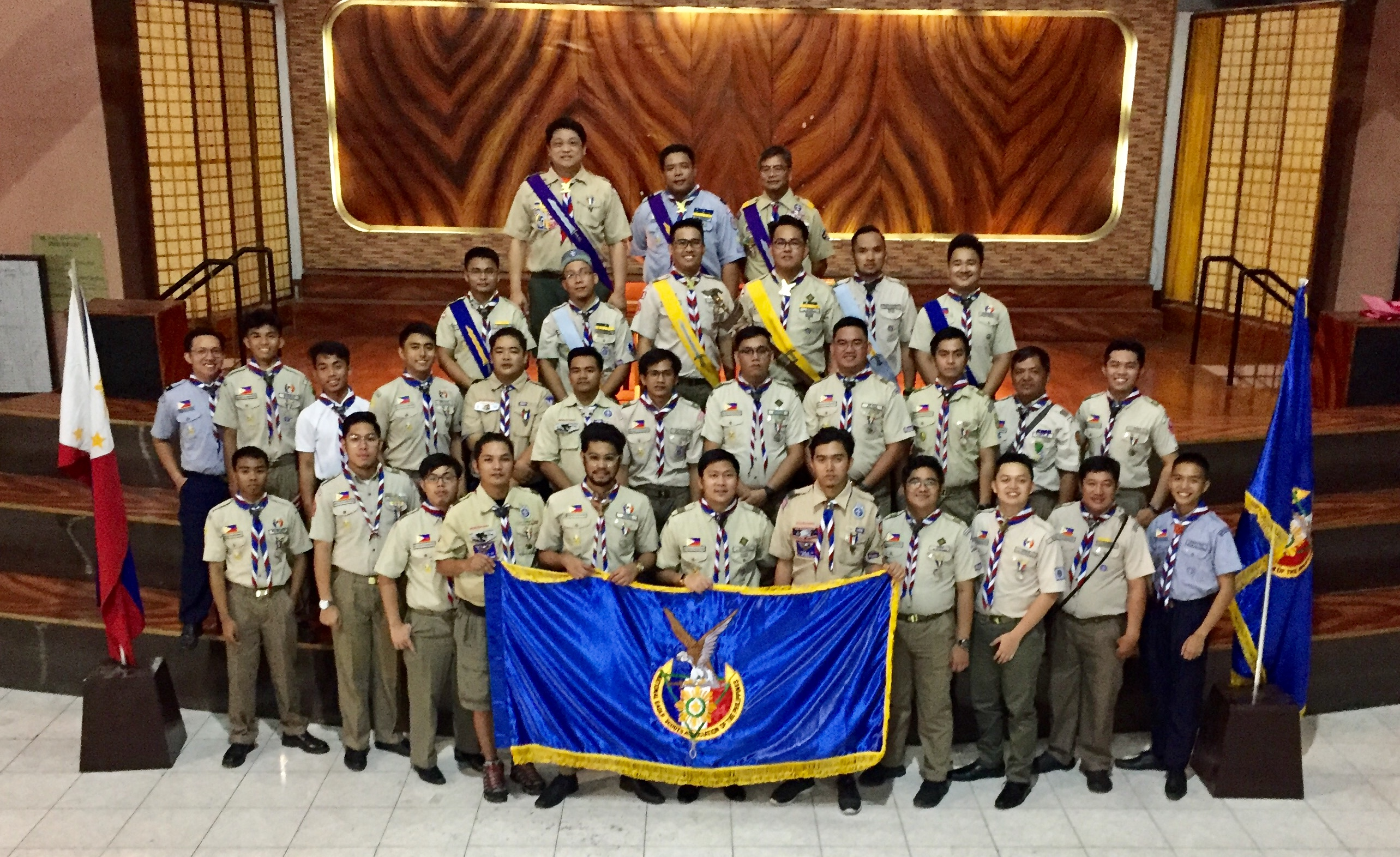
NESAPh Second Acceptance Rites in Rizal, November 24, 2019

Building on the success of these events, Bro. Lyel identified the need for a similar group in his hometown. During the Association of Top Achiever Scouts Gathering on 18 October 2019, plans for the second ceremony were finalized, scheduled for San Mateo, Rizal, on 24 November 2019. NESAPh aimed to consolidate Eagle Scouts nationwide under its banner. Meanwhile, Bro. Jacobb Josephson Caones organized a Gathering of Eagle Scouts in Quezon City on 10 February 2019, but realizing the futility of working with existing Eagle groups, efforts were redirected to the new and dynamic NESAPh group. Notably, Bro. Jacobb generously donated 1 million pesos as a startup fund for the association, contributing to NESAPh's continued success.

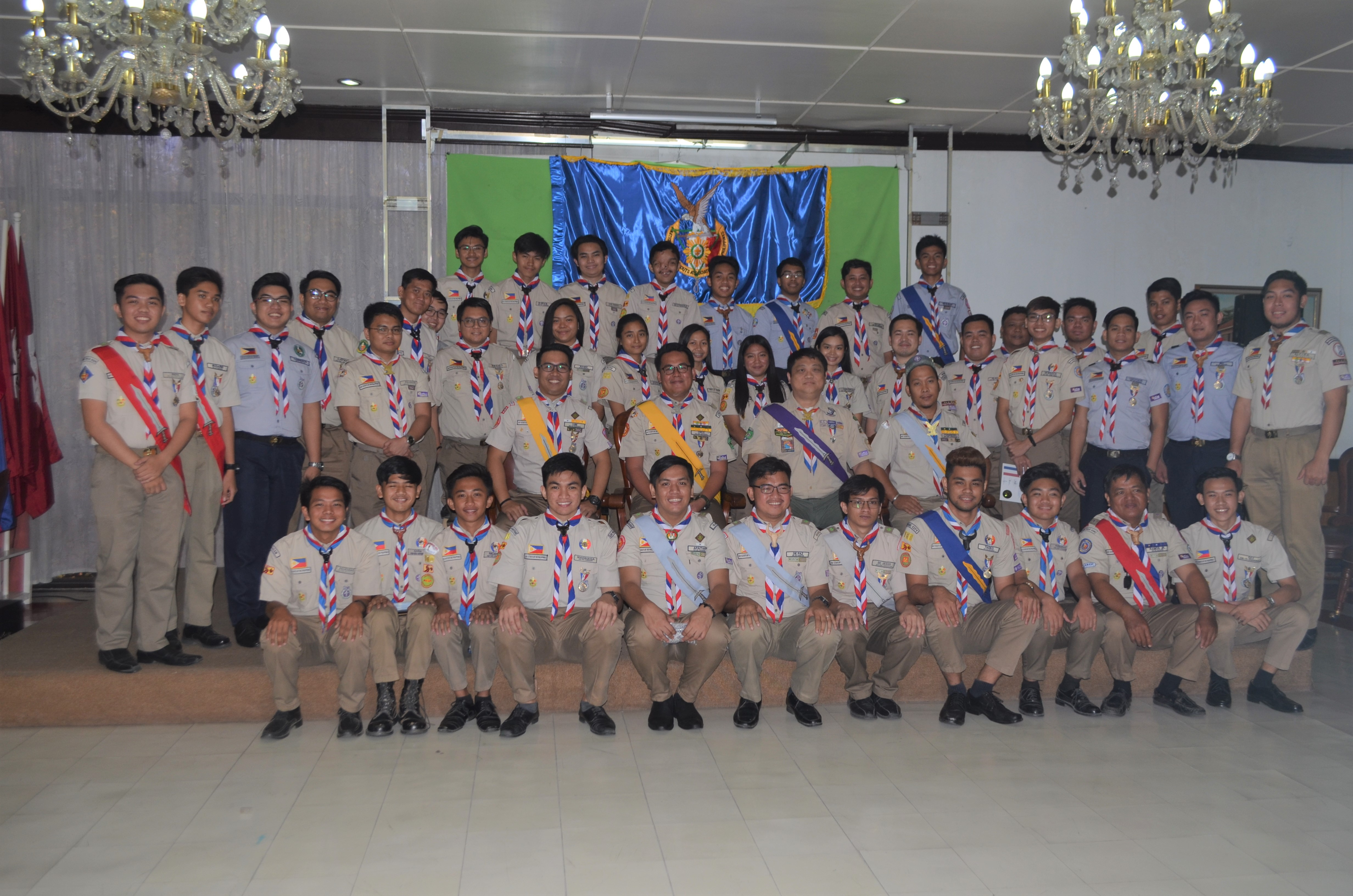
NESAPh Third Acceptance Rites in Manila

The third ritual, held in Intramuros, marked the first time NESAPh accepted female Eagle Scouts. Subsequent ceremonies took place in Manila, Tacloban City, Camarines Sur, Bacolod City, Cabanatuan City, and Cagayan de Oro, affirming NESAPh's status as a National Association.

Following successful travels and membership growth, NESAPh held its 1st General Assembly and Conclave on 28 February – 1 March 2020 in Bulacan. This event ratified the Association's Constitution and By-Laws, elected new National Officers, and welcomed members from across the Philippine archipelago.

The onset of the COVID-19 Pandemic caught the new National Executive Committee off-guard. Nevertheless, NESAPh continued its mission through community service projects, webinars, and virtual acceptance rites, leading to the establishment of NESAPh International Chapter.

As lockdowns eased, NESAPh conducted Acceptance Rites in Davao, Butuan, Cebu, Cabanatuan, Mandaluyong, and the Province of Laguna, further solidifying its impact.

In a triumphant membership campaign, NESAPh held its 2nd General Assembly and Conclave on 2-4 December 2022 in the Camelot Hotel, Quezon City. With Bro. Mark Roy L. Boado as the new National President, the "Second Age" commenced, focusing on membership engagement, financial stability, outreach expansion, sustainable programs, and collaborative partnerships.

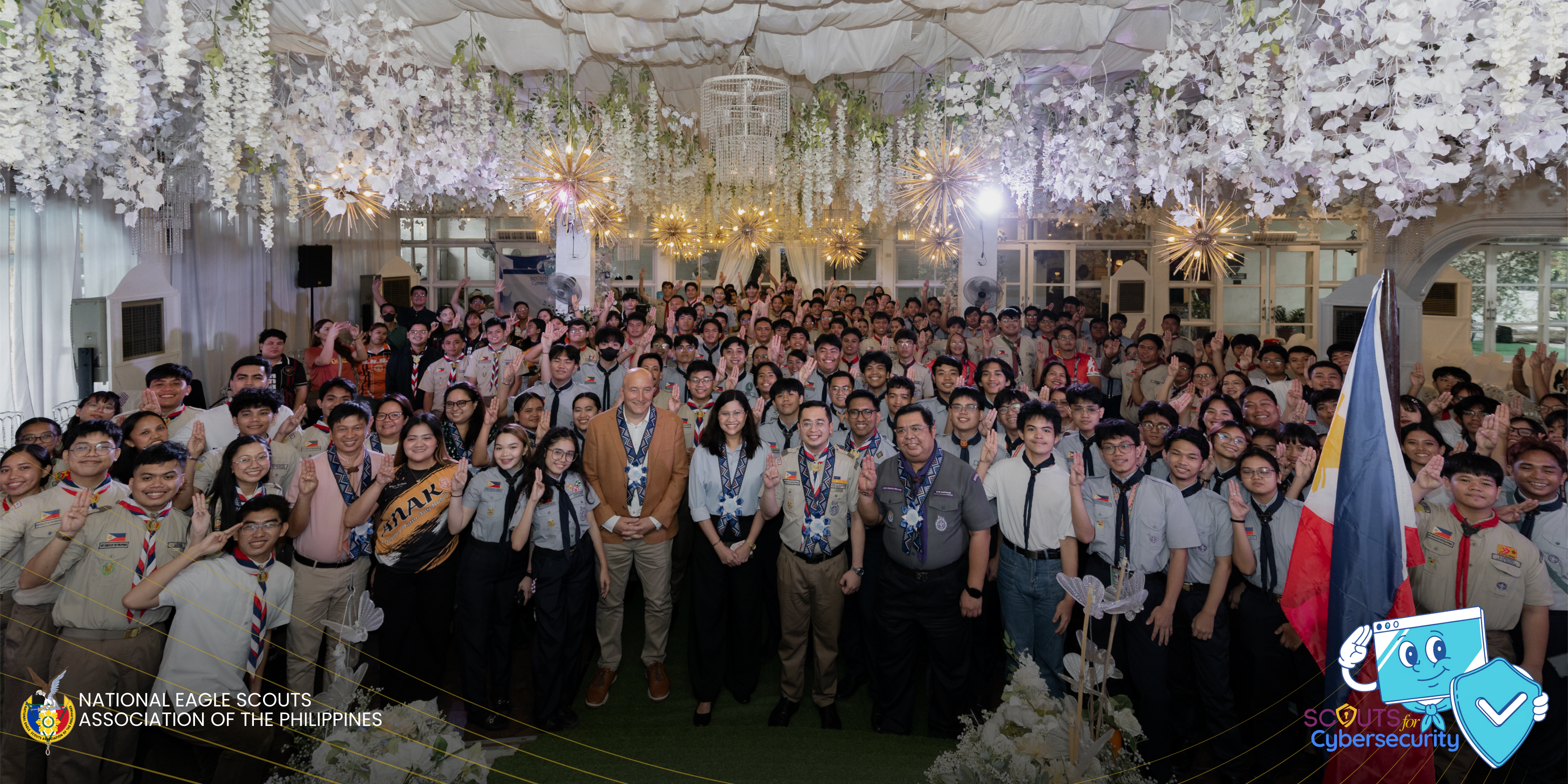
NESAPh Scouts for Cybersecurity in Taguig City

The Third General Assembly and Conference (GACon)Third General Assembly and Conference (GACon) of the National Eagle Scouts Association of the Philipnines (NESAPh) on 28-30 March 2025 in the Camelot Hotel, Quezon City. The event gathered Eagle Scouts from across the country to strengthen collaboration, celebrate milestones, and chart the future direction of the association. During the Third Voyage, NESAPh reaffirmed its commitment to lead with Bro. Lauro Reuben C. Delas Llagas as the new President.

Leadership, service, and innovation in Scouting. The event highlighted the launch of key national initiatives such as Scouts for Cybersecurity, a pioneering program promoting online safety and digital resilience among Scouts, and the NESAPh Leadership Academy, which aims to develop capable, values-driven leaders across its chapters. The assembly also recognized the ongoing operations of local chapters actively engaged in nation-building, community aid, and social development projects throughout the Philippines. Through these collective efforts, NESAPh continues to embody the enduring spirit of Scouting — fostering unity, service, and excellence among Eagle Scouts nationwide.

== National Executive Committee ==
The Members of the National Executive Committee, elected during NESAPh's 3rd General Assembly and Conclave on 30 March 2025 at the New Camelot Hotel, Quezon City, Philippines.

National Executive Committee (2025-2027)
| Position | Name |
|---|---|
| National President | Lauro Reuben C. Delas Llagas |
| Senior Vice President | Alex De Guzman Jr. |
| Vice President for Luzon | Edel Dela Cruz |
| Vice President for Visayas | Jason Paul Mendez |
| Vice President for Mindanao | Glenn Añora |
| Vice President for International Affairs | Adrian Estrella |
| National Secretary | John Llyod Lebita |
| National Archivist^{*} | Jomarie Cabahug |
| National Treasurer | Philip Mclean O. Soberano |
| National Auditor | Jerrom Gabriel A. Duque |
| National Public Relations Officer^{*} | Joey Allen T. Dadang |
| Chief Eagle Scout Marshall | Eugene Chua |
| Dean of the Elders Fold | Jacobb Josephson Caones |

^{*} Appointee of the National President as mandated by NESAPh's Constitution and Bylaws.

== Support from the Boy Scouts of the Philippines ==
The paramount success of NESAPh was achieved because of the continued support being given by the Boy Scouts of the Philippines, viz:

1. BSP and NESAPh Memorandum of Agreement Signing (National Executive Board Room, BSP National Headquarters | 4 October 2019)
2. BSP informing all concerned about BSP and NESAPh’s partnership (BSP National Office Memo No. 05, s. 2020 | 27 January 2020)
3. BSP endorsing NESAPh’s 1st General Assembly and Conclave, and highly encouraging the participation of Eagle Scouts from different Local Councils (BSP National Office Memo No. 06, s. 2020 | 27 January 2020)

== Membership process ==
NESAPh is an association of Eagle Scouts that welcomes those who wish to continue their service and commitment to Scouting. All former Senior Scouts who earned the Eagle Scout rank and its equivalent (Jose Rizal Scout and the Scout Citizen Awardee) shall require showing proof of achievement before invitation and nomination for membership.

The Association is open to all registered members of the Boy Scouts of the Philippines who have successfully earned the highest rank in Senior Scouting which is the Eagle Scout rank.

The Association ensures and sees to it that candidates and nominees for membership shall subscribe to the Fundamental Principles of Scouting based on his/her own free will, as well as the acceptance of Scouting's declaration of its Religious Policy governing membership.

The Association shall only accept members based on invitation and/or nomination of bona fide members in good standing and shall be subjected to deliberation for recommendation of the Membership Committee and approval of the National Officers.

All interested Eagle Scouts who have been invited and or nominated for membership shall be subjected to membership verification as to the authenticity of his/her qualification as an official and legitimate Eagle Scout awardee or its equivalent rank.

The process of membership by nomination aims to measure commitment to actively participate in our activities. NESAPh doesn't want a huge number of members with very few active members. While Scouting, remains to be open for all, and primarily based on free will and volunteerism, NESAPh adheres to carefully select Eagle Scouts who wish to take active involvement in Leadership and Service, thus, requires expressed commitment, and careful selection through nomination.

== Chapters ==
=== Established chapters ===
1. Marcelo H. Del Pilar Chapter No. 1 (Est. 24 February 2018)
2. Jose Protacio Rizal Chapter No. 2 (Est. 24 November 2019)
3. Valeriano Ibañez Abello Chapter No. 3 (Est. 25 August 2019)
4. Rajah Sulayman Chapter No. 4 (Est. 15 September 2019)
5. General Simeon A. Ola Chapter No. 5 (Est. 25 September 2019)
6. Papa Isio Chapter No. 6 (Est. 26 October 2019)
7. Agapito-Garcia Chapter No. 7 (Est. 10 November 2019)
8. Pablo “Ambing” Magtajas Chapter No. 8 (Est. 16 November 2019)
9. Antonio Rios Torillo Chapter No. 9 (Est. 01 March 2020)
10. Jose Maria Panganiban Chapter No. 10 (Est. 26 January 2021)
11. Arsenio Nicasio Luz Chapter No. 11 (Est. 26 January 2021)
12. Felipe-Marcela Agoncillo Chapter No. 12 (Est. 26 January 2021)
13. Agustin Sumuroy Chapter No. 13 (Est. 26 January 2021)
14. Colonel Maximo Abad Chapter No. 14 (Est. 26 January 2021)
15. Rajah Kolambu Chapter No. 15 (Est. 26 January 2021)
16. Datu Bago Chapter No. 16 (Est. 26 January 2021)
17. San Pedro Calungsod Chapter No. 17 (Est. 27 February 2022)
18. Hen. Vicente "Kalentong" Leyba Chapter No. 18 (Est. 3 July 2022)
19. Hen. Agueda Kahabagan y Iniquinto Chapter No. 19 (Est. 2 July 2022)
20. Epifanio de los Santos Chapter No. 20 (Est. 30 September 2023)
21. Andres Bonifacio Chapter No. 21 (Est. 1 March 2025)
22. Don Angel Pantaleon de Miranda Chapter No. 22 (Est. 19 March 2025)
23. Gen. Valentin A. Cruz Chapter No. 23 (Est. 28 March 2025)

=== Petitioning chapters ===
1. Baguio City
2. Eastern Pangasinan
3. Tarlac Province
4. Antique Province
5. Tagum City
6. Cotabato City
