= Rashtrapati Scout and Guide Award =

Scouting award

- Owner: President of India
- Awarded for: achievements in the field of scouting

The Rashtrapati Scout and Guide Award is an award presented by the President of India. The nominees are required to serve as a Rajya Puraskar Scout and Guide for at least one year.

== Eligibility ==
Apart from the Rajya Puraskar, the candidate should:

1. Have camped for three consecutive days with his troops
2. Have been able to create a shelter of sorts (hut or machan) from natural resources available for capacity of two people to sleep in
3. Have a disaster management badge
4. Have an ambulance man badge

== See also ==
- Rashtrapati Award
- List of highest scouting awards by country
