= President's Scout (Singapore Scout Association) =

- Sponsored by: Singapore Scout Association
- Country: Singapore
- Formerly called: King's Scout Badge, Queen's Scout Badge

The President's Scout Award is the highest award for Venture Scouts in the Singapore Scout Association. The concept of the President's Scout Award (PSA) for Singapore Scouts was first mooted when the former colony of UK attained independence in 1965, after a brief merger with the Federation of Malaysia between 1963–65 and self-governance as the State of Singapore between 1959-63. The Singapore Boy Scouts Association (renamed the Singapore Scout Association in 1968) was a branch of The Scout Association, UK. Following the British Policy, Organisation and Rules (POR) since 1910, the Association had issued King's Scout badges (and later Queen's Scout badges after 1952) to qualified Boy Scouts since General Baden-Powell founded the award, granted by King Edward VII in 1909.

== Predecessors 1910-1968 ==
With the founding of the Senior Scout Section in 1946, the Boy Scout programme was distinguished by a junior and senior Scout section. To qualify for the King's Scout Award, Senior Scouts had to complete four specified Senior Scout public service proficiency badges and the Bushman's Thong (or Seaman's badge or Airman's Badge). This thong was worn over the right shoulder by qualified Senior Scouts while the Seaman/Airman's Badge was worn on the centre of the right sleeve.

At the time of Singapore's political independence, the highest Scout award that could be attained by a Senior Scout then was the Queen's Scout Badge. For a brief period after self-governance and independence, the Queen's Scout Badge was known as the "Royal Certificate" to address the interim political arrangements.

== 1968-present ==
It was not until 1968 when the term "President's Scout" was introduced after much deliberations about the change in name. Suggestions such as "Singa Scout" (meaning Lion Scout, as Singapore was fondly referred to as the Lion's City or Singapura in Malay) were made but "President's Scout" was decided as the most suitable successor to the Queen's Scout title. Notably, the inaugural batch of President's Scouts in 1968 were still issued with the Queen's Scout Badge as the new badge design had yet to be settled. This was also the last time Senior Scouts made their appearance as the section was closed along with Rover Scouts in accordance with the recommendations of the Advance Party Report. In its place, British Scout HQ formed the Venture Scout section. Singapore's Rover Scouts were however, re-established in 1975 due to demand, but have remained a small section in the local movement as Singapore Rovering never recovered from the disastrous implementation of the Advance Party Report recommendations. Rover Scouts who have gained the President's Scout Award are allowed to continue to wear the President's Scout Award until he/she gains the Baden-Powell Award.

== Insignia ==
The President's Scout Certificate is the same in design as the King/Queen's Scout Certificates except for the state crest and signatory. The national Coat of arms replaced the British Coat-of-Arms, and Queen Elizabeth II's signature was substituted by that of the Chief Scout and President of the Republic of Singapore.

The present red-rimmed pentagon design with the national crest and red wording "President's Scout" is introduced in 1969. However, the first issue of the badges were only made available to the Venture Scouts in 1971. The Venture Scout at that time could only wear two progress badges - the Venture Scout Standard (Venture Award of the UK), and the President's Scout Award on their left sleeves - and nothing more! These apparently led to some complaints about the lack of badges for show. In 1975, the Singapore Scout Association adopted the Venture Achievement Badges (and Achievement Flashes) from The Scout Association of Hong Kong for wear to indicate the stage of progress in Venture Scout Standard and the President's Scout Award, to be worn on the right sleeves. A Venture Scout would have to satisfy the respective requirements in the four areas of Responsibility, Activity (later known as Pursuit), Skills and Self-Reliance when tested for the Venture progress badges.

For adult leaders who had gained the President's Scout Award, a miniature replica is introduced for wear on the left shirt pocket flap to indicate the achievement after 2000.

== Current requirements ==
In 2000, Singapore Scout Association finally shedded the last influence of UK from its Venture Scout training scheme and badges by introducing its own three-stage progress and new badges. To gain the President's Scout Award, a Venture Scout would have to first gain the Venture Scout Standard and Venture Scout Cord progress badges, as well as eight Venture proficiency badges.

The Venture Scout would then have to complete three further assessments conducted nationally in order to be awarded the President's Scout Award. One of them was to successfully complete an evaluation training camp known as the "A.S.P.I.Re", and the other was to complete an assigned PSA project to the satisfaction of the National Venture Scout Council. After successfully completing the two assessments, the President Scout Candidate was then required to appear before an interview panel, after which, if successful, he would be awarded the PSA at an annual ceremony held at the President of Singapore's residence, the Istana.

In 2017, the new Venture Scout Progress Badge Scheme and new award system was implemented and several changes were made. The Venture Challenge Course was implemented as a replacement to the A.S.P.I.Re camp with similar requirements. The alternative to this is to complete the classic 21-day Challenge Course conducted by Outward Bound Singapore. The PSA project was renamed to the Venture Scout Service Project (VSSP) and moved 1 tier down.

The PSA Review Committee was introduced, requiring the recommending Venture Scout Leader to appear before a review committee to discuss and support his/her recommendation.

The PSA Nominee's Forum was introduced to replace the interview panel. This involves interaction of the PSA nominees with different representatives from the appropriate government institutions such as the Ministry of Education (Singapore), National Youth Council as well as the Scout Council and National Programme Council. Successful nominees would be recommended and, barring any exceptional cases, would be awarded the PSA in a similar ceremony.

== See also ==
- List of highest awards in Scouting
