= Fédération Nationale du Scoutisme Marocain =

Scouting federation in Morocco

- الجامعة الوطنية للكشفية المغربية
- Country: Morocco
- Founded: 1933
- Membership: 12,304
- President: Prince Moulay Rachid
- Affiliation: World Organization of the Scout Movement, World Association of Girl Guides and Girl Scouts
- Website https://scout.org.ma

The Fédération Nationale du Scoutisme Marocain (Arabic: الجامعة الوطنية للكشفية المغربية) is the national federation of several Scouting organizations of Morocco. It was founded in 1933, became a member of the World Organization of the Scout Movement in 1961, and a member of World Association of Girl Guides and Girl Scouts in 2026. The coeducational Fédération Nationale du Scoutisme Marocain has 12,304 members as of 2004.

== Members ==
The members of the federation are

- the Organisation du Scout Marocain
- the Scoutisme Hassania Marocain
- the Organisation Marocaine des Scouts et des Guides

== History ==
In 1978, Mahmoud el-Alamy was awarded the Bronze Wolf, the only distinction of the World Organization of the Scout Movement, awarded by the World Scout Committee for exceptional services to world Scouting.

In 1994, the international seminar "Scouting: Youth without Borders" was held in Morocco.

Since April 1997, Prince Moulay Rachid has been the president of the National Federation of Moroccan Scouting.

The Atlas Jamboree was inaugurated on 23 July 2007 in Ras El Maa. Around 2400 scouts, Beavers, Scouts, Guides, Senior Scouts and Rovers participated in the jamboree, organised by the Scoutisme Hassania Marocain.

== Program and ideals ==
Each of the associations in the federation has a program which includes many community service activities and development projects.

- Louveteaux (Cub Scouts) - ages 7 to 11
- Eclaireurs (Scouts) - ages 12 to 17
- Routiers (Rover Scouts) - ages 17 to 25

The Scout Motto is Kun Musta'idan or كن مستعداً, Be Prepared in Arabic, and is Sois Prêt in French. The noun for a single Scout is Kashaf or كشاف in Arabic.

The Scout emblem of the Fédération Nationale du Scoutisme Marocain, as well as those of most federation members, incorporates the seal of Suleiman of the flag of Morocco.
