= Eagle Scout (Boy Scouts of the Philippines) =

Highest rank of Senior Scout

- Owner: Boy Scouts of the Philippines
- Country: Philippines
- Created: 1936

Eagle Scout is the highest rank awarded to a Senior Scout in the Boy Scouts of the Philippines (BSP). To be awarded the rank, a Scout must lead in planning and doing one or two community service projects and earn a total of 23 merit badges consisting of 17 required merit badges and 2 specialist ratings (a specialist rating involves 3 related merit badges and a community service project). After achieving the rank of Eagle, a Scout may earn an Anahaw award for earning 2 additional specialist ratings.

The term Eagle Scout, Eagle, or Agila is used to refer to a person who was given the award. The award's name was derived from the Eagle Scout awarded by the Boy Scouts of America (BSA). From 1923 to 1936 (when the Philippines was a protectorate of the United States), the BSA administered the Boy Scouts program in the Philippines through the Philippine Council, BSA. According to the BSP's Diamond Jubilee Yearbook from 1936 to September 1996 there are 121,369 Scouts awarded the highest rank by the Boy Scouts of the Philippines.

The BSP's highest rank went through a number of name and requirement changes through the years after the Philippines gained its independence from the United States of America.

- Eagle Scout (1936–1962)
- José Rizal Scout (1962–1976)
- Scout Citizen Award (1976–1994)
- Eagle Scout (1994–present)

All awardees are eligible for membership into the Eagle Scouts Organization of the Philippines, the fellowship and service association of all Eagle Scouts from the BSP and from the BSA having Filipino lineage and/or nationality and the National Eagle Scouts Association of the Philippines, the Premiere Honor Society of Eagle Scouts in the Philippines. Eagle Scouts where previously called Rizal Scouts (1962-1976).

== Anahaw award ==
The Anahaw Award is a metal Anahaw leaf that is pinned on the ribbon of the Eagle Scout Medal. The award is similar to the Boy Scouts of America's use of Eagle Palms for their Eagle Scout Award. The name derives from Anahaw, a Filipino common name of palm trees in the genus Livistona.

After a Scout has earned the Eagle Scout Rank and before reaching the age of 17 years, he can go on to pursue the Anahaw Award. In addition to the 23 Merit Badges for the Eagle Scout Rank, the Anahaw Award may be granted as follows:

- For any 2 additional Specialist Rating after earning the Eagle Scout Rank - Bronze Anahaw Award.
- For any 2 additional Specialist Rating after earning the Bronze Anahaw Award - Silver Anahaw Award.
- For any 2 additional Specialist Rating after earning the Silver Anahaw Award - Gold Anahaw Award.

The Bronze Anahaw Award shall be given only after at least three-(3) months of active Scouting as an Eagle Scout. Subsequent Anahaw Awards may be made at intervals not less the four-(4) months of tenure following the conferment of an Anahaw Award of lower grade.

== Eagle Scout Association of the Philippines ==
The Eagle Scout Association of the Philippines (ESAP) is the national fellowship and service association of men who have received the rank of Eagle Scout from the Boy Scouts of the Philippines (BSP). The association also accepts into membership Eagle Scouts from the Boy Scouts of America (BSA) who are of Filipino lineage or nationality.

The association was founded in January 1998 during the BSP's 11th National Jamboree at Clark Field in the province of Pampanga. It replaced an earlier association named Citizen Awardees, Rizals, and Eagle Scouts Association (CARES).

It started its ESAP milestone in the 1st ESAP General Assembly held last May 23–25, 2008 at Columban College Hotel, Olongapo City with the theme: "Eagle Quest and Beyond". It was hosted by ESAP Olongapo Chapter headed by CSE Mario Esquillo, Chapter President. The Eagle Scout Gathering marks the start of the association where it held the ESAP Ritual officiated by ES Arnell Alambra, Vice President for International Affairs as Ritual Master and ES Chito L. Morante, National President and other ESAP Officers as Guardian of the Circle.

== See also ==
- List of highest awards in Scouting
