= Venturer Scout =

Scouting program

Venturer or Venture Scouts are programs in some Scouting organisations for young people of various age ranges in the 14–20 age range. A participant in the program is called a Venturer.

== Australia ==
The Venturer Scout program in Scouts Australia, often just known as Venturers, is a program for young people 15–18 years old as of 2018. The program is flexible, but usually with a strong outdoor flavour. The camps for this section are based on the knowledge learned by a Venturer in the scout section, and many camps are geared towards learning skills for professional and adult life. The highest award that can be earned by a Venturer Scout is the Queen's Scout award. Venturer Scouts belong to a Venturer Scout Unit which can be part of a Scout Group or affiliated to a Scout District. The Venturer Scout section holds a national Australian Venture every 3 years. During this week and a half long camp the Venturers will participate in activities such as Mountain Biking, Sailing, Wind Surfing, Caving, etc. There are also smaller ventures held by Australian states or regions that operate between the tri-yearly Australian Venture. The next Australian Venture will be held early 2018 and situated in Queensland.

== Brazil ==
The Venturer Scout Section in União dos Escoteiros do Brasil, often just known as Tropa Sênior, is for young people 15–17 years old. The educational program applied to the senior branch meets the needs of young people of both sexes aged between 15 and 17 years, and focuses its emphasis on the process of self-knowledge, acceptance and enhancement of personal characteristics and helping the young in their physical, intellectual, spiritual and social.

The troop of seniors (boys) and Guides (girls) are divided into four patrols at most 4–6 young, constituting a primary permanent, autonomous and self-sufficient for excursions, camps, jobs, games, good deeds, community activities Scouts and other activities. Each patrol senior or guides adopts a characteristic name, which may be the geographical accident of well known for patrol or a national indigenous tribe. It is made available to patrol it until April 30, 1990, have adopted the name of a large or national historical character, preserve the name adopted.

In the work and activities that, by their nature, require interests, skills or expertise, the patrols will give way to work teams, each comprising members from different patrols, the coordination of each team member to their best qualified.

Other characteristics of this branch are similar to class Scout.

Venturer Scouts belong to a Scout Group. The Venturer Scout section holds a Venture every 3 years. During this week and a half long camp the Venturers will participate in activities such as Mountain Biking, Sailing, Wind Surfing, Caving, etc.

The next Venture will be held July 2010 in Paranaguá, PR.

== Scouts Canada ==
Venturers are young men and women ages 14 through 18 organized into a company. The Venturer motto is "Challenge".

Venturer companies are usually structured with an Executive, composed of President, Secretary, and Treasurer, and may also include a Quartermaster depending on the group's size and equipment needs.

Outdoor activities may be, but are not limited to: rafting, canoeing, and kayaking in white water, mountain climbing and camping. The leadership of a Venturer Company is entirely youth led with support from Scouters who are known as Advisors. Venturer companies have the option of becoming vocational Venturers. These Venturers participate on training and service related to a specific career, as well as following the Scouting program. The most common vocational Venturer Companies include Fire Venturers, Police Venturers, and Medical Venturers (EMS). Medical Venturers or MedVents is a program where the youth learn and provide first-aid for camps and public events.

Venturers seeks to foster the leadership, management and administrative skills of its members, help young people make friendships, explore career opportunities and have outdoor adventure.

== Scouting Ireland ==
Venture Scouts in Scouting Ireland are aged between 15 and 17 years. The award scheme is the Venture Scout version of ONE Programme. Each group has a Venture Scout Executive which, under the guidance of an adult Scouter, designs and implements activities.

== Japan ==
In Japan, Venturer Scouts are aged 14–19. The program focuses on self-motivation, world citizenship, and outdoor activities.

== Malta ==
Hamrun Venture Scouts, Malta, during an Expedition

A Venture Scout in Malta is between 14 and 18 years of age. Their programme consists of the Discovery Award, Olympian Award, Dolphin Award and President's Award (the Duke of Edinburgh Award).

== Singapore ==
A Venture Scout in Singapore is a Scout between the ages of 15 and 18.

From 2000, the two progress badges are the Venture Scout Standard and the Venture Cord, which have 8 sections each for completion. The highest award that a Venture Scout can achieve is the prestigious President's Scout Award, which is presented to the recipient by the current President of the Republic of Singapore in the Istana.

In 1969, the Senior Scout section and the Rover Scout section in Singapore were merged to form the Venture Scout section after the Singapore Scout Association followed the recommendations of the 1966 Chief Scout's Advance Party Report in the UK. Singapore adopted the UK training scheme and the progress badge of Venture Award (renamed the Venture Standard) but replaced the Queen's Scout Award with the President's Scout Award as the highest award attainable for a Venture Scout. The training scheme underwent further fine-tuning in the 1970s and 1980s that stipulated four key training areas in responsibility, pursuit, skills and self-reliance before giving way to a revised programme in 2000.

From 1969 to 1975, a Venture Scout only had his Venture Scout Standard or President's Scout Award to show for his progress on his left sleeve of the uniform. Feedback showed that the youths wanted a breakdown of their progress that could be displayed on the uniform. In 1975, Singapore adopted the four Venture "proficiency" badges from Hong Kong that showed the four areas that led to the completion of the Venture Standard. The four "proficiency" badges were worn on the right arm sleeve. A President's Scout would wear an additional gold flash under each "proficiency" badge when the requirements were completed. These were replaced by the eight sectional "proficiencies" in 2000.

From 2017 onwards, the venture progress scheme was revamped. The Venture Scout Standard and Venture Cord was replaced with the Venture Badge, Trekker Award and Pioneer Award. The highest award that a Venture Scout can achieve remained the prestigious President's Scout Award, which is presented by the current President of the Republic of Singapore in the Istana.

== United Kingdom: The Scout Association ==
In 1967, as part of the adoption of The Chief Scouts' Advance Party Report, Venture Scouts replaced the Rover Scouts and Senior Scout programs in The Scout Association. The program was for those aged 15.5 to 20. In 1976 it was the first program of The Scout Association opened up to female participants. The Venture Scout program was replaced by the Explorer Scout program and the Scout Network following a review in 2003.

Venture Scouts had an active programme, which promoted outdoor activities and community service. There were two awards available to members of the section – the Venture Scout Award, and the Queen's Scout Award. The latter award has been the highest award available to the youth sections of Scouting, and continues to be available to the two sections which replaced the Venture Scouts, though now known as the King's Scout Award. Venture Scouts wore the same uniform as leaders but could choose from a brown tie or group/unit/district scarf. Venture Scouting was at its strongest in the 1980s, and there followed a rapid decline in the 1990s.

== United States ==
Venturing is a program for young men and young women of ages 14–20 (or 13 and completed the 8th grade). This, along with Sea Scouting, Exploring, and Learning for Life, is one of the Boy Scouts of America's four co-ed programs.
