= Nor Zamani Abdol Hamid =

Yang Berbahagia Datuk Nor Zamani Abdol Hamid PMW

18th Director-General of Education
- In office 22 June 2021 – 29 July 2022
- Monarch: Abdullah
- Prime Minister: Muhyiddin Yassin (2021); Ismail Sabri Yaakob (2021–2022)
- Minister: Radzi Jidin
- Preceded by: Habibah Abdul Rahim
- Succeeded by: Pkharuddin Ghazali

Personal details
- Born: 29 July 1962 (age 64) Malaysia
- Citizenship: Malaysian
- Education: University of Malaya
- Occupation: Educator

Nor Zamani binti Abdol Hamid (born 29 July 1962) is a Malaysian civil servant and educator who served as the 18th Director-General of Education from 22 June 2021 to 29 July 2022.

== Education ==
She obtained a bachelor's degree in sociology and anthropology, as well as a master's degree in education at University of Malaya.

== Career ==
Zamani started her career as the Head of A-Level Department at Kolej Tunku Kurshiah in 1986. In her 35-year career at the Ministry of Education, she served various positions, including the Deputy Director-General of Education.

On 2 July 2021, the Ministry of Education announced that Zamani was appointed Director-General of Education on 22 June. She is the 3rd woman educator to hold the position, after Asiah Abu Samah and Habibah Abdul Rahim.

== Honour ==
- Federal Territory (Malaysia)
  - Knight Commander of the Order of the Territorial Crown (PMW) – Datuk (2022)
