= Habibah Abdul Rahim =

Malaysian educator and the former Director-General of Education

Yang Berbahagia Datuk Dr. Habibah Abdul Rahim PJN SSIS

17th Director-General of Education
- In office 10 January 2020 – 28 March 2021
- Monarch: Abdullah
- Prime Minister: Mahathir Mohamad (2020); Muhyiddin Yassin (2020–2021)
- Minister: Mahathir Mohamad (Acting) (2020); Mohd Radzi Md Jidin (2020–2021)
- Preceded by: Amin Senin
- Succeeded by: Nor Zamani Abdol Hamid

Personal details
- Born: 5 April 1961 (age 65) Malaysia
- Citizenship: Malaysian
- Education: Stanford University
- Occupation: Educator

Habibah binti Abdul Rahim (born 5 April 1961) is a Malaysian educator and the former Director-General of Education from January 2020 to March 2021 (but took compulsory retirement as she turned 60 years of age in April the same year).

== Education ==
Habibah graduated with a Bachelor of Philosophy with Honors in Biology from the University of Salford in 1985. She then went on to study for a master's degree in education at the University of Bristol in 1993. Habibah earned a Doctor of Philosophy degree in education from Stanford University in 2001.

== Honours ==
=== Honours of Malaysia ===
- Malaysia
  - Commander of the Order of Meritorious Service (PJN) - Datuk (2020)
- Selangor
  - Knight Grand Companion of the Order of Sultan Sharafuddin Idris Shah (SSIS) - Datin Paduka Setia (2020)
