= President's Award =

The President's Award may refer to:

- Gaisce, The President's Award, Ireland
- NAACP Image Award - President's Award, United States
- Rashtrapati Award, given by the President of India
- the highest rank of the Kiribati Scout Association
- President's Awards, a pair of awards given annually by the American Hockey League (AHL)

Also,

- Presidents' Award, of the British Psychological Society
