= Mohd Zin Bidin =

Malaysian scouts

Yang Berbahagia Major General (Rtd.) Datuk Wira Mohd Zin Bidin DCSM DPMS PAT JSM DSM KAT KMN
- محمد زين بيدين

7th National Chief Scout of Malaysia
- Incumbent
- Assumed office 15 December 2023
- Royal Patron: Ibrahim
- President: Anwar Ibrahim
- Preceded by: Himself (Acting)

Acting National Chief Scout of Malaysia
- Covering duties 11 September 2019 – 15 December 2023
- Royal Patron: Abdullah; Ibrahim
- President: Mahathir Mohamad; Muhyiddin Yassin; Ismail Sabri Yaakob; Anwar Ibrahim
- Preceded by: Shafie Salleh
- Succeeded by: Himself

13th National Chief Scout Commissioner of Malaysia
- In office 17 January 2016 – January 2024
- Royal Patron: Abdul Halim; Muhammad V Abdullah; Ibrahim
- President: Najib Razak; Mahathir Mohamad; Muhyiddin Yassin; Ismail Sabri Yaakob; Anwar Ibrahim
- Preceded by: Mohamad Shahrum Osman
- Succeeded by: Nasaruddin Shamsuddin

Personal details
- Born: Mohd Zin bin Bidin; 27 May 1954 (age 72) Cheras, Selangor, Federation of Malaya (now Malaysia)
- Education: Kajang High School; Victoria Institution
- Alma mater: National University of Malaysia (MD); University of the Philippines (MPH); Mahidol University (MSc)
- Occupation: Doctor, military officer

Mohd Zin bin Bidin (Jawi: محمد زين بن بيدين; born 27 May 1954) is a Malaysian scout, military officer and medical doctor who has served as 7th National Chief Scout of Malaysia since December 2023. A King's Scout since his youth, he also served as Acting National Chief Scout of Malaysia from 11 September 2019 until 15 December 2023 and 13th National Chief Scout Commissioner of Malaysia from 17 January 2016 until January 2024.

== Early life and education ==
Mohd Zin bin Bidin was born on 27 May 1954 in Cheras, Selangor, Federation of Malaya (now Malaysia). He was the third child from eight siblings.

Mohd Zin went to Kajang High School and Victoria Institution. He was involved in the Scouts Association of Malaysia, and earned that program's highest rank, King's Scout in 1971.

Mohd Zin graduated from Universiti Kebangsaan Malaysia in Doctor of Medicine (MD). During his university years, he underwent the training as army reserve officer cadet. He also attained post-graduate qualifications in University of Philippines on Master of Public Health (MPH) and Mahidol University on Master of Science (MSc) in Clinical Tropical Medicine and Hygiene.

== Army and medical career ==
On 11 November 1983, Mohd Zin was commissioned as a Captain in the Royal Medical and Dental Corps by the Yang di-Pertuan Agong. He has held clinical, operational, academic, and leadership roles. He has received national and international awards. On 2 January 2018, he began serving as a professor and dean at the University of Cyberjaya. He previously served as Vice-Chancellor of Widad University College (formerly University College Shahputra) and as the Dean of the Faculty of Medicine at the National Defense University of Malaysia (UPNM).

Mohd Zin was the National Chief Medical Officer of the Malaysian Formula One Grand Prix and also holds the Chief Medical Officer Superlicence of the Federation Internationale de Motocyclisme (FIM).

In addition to serving on the Scientific Council of the International Committee of Military Medicine and the International Advisory Committee of the Journal of Military and Veterans Health Australia, Mohd Zin was the Founding Chairman of the National Sports Institute. In addition, he is the founding head of the committee of the International Network of UNESCO Chair in Bioethics Malaysia and a member of the Fellowship Awards Committee of the Malaysian Public Health Physician Association.

== Scouting career ==
Mohd Zin was appointed as 13th National Chief Scout Commissioner of Malaysia in 2016. Later, he was served as the acting National Chief Scout of Malaysia after Shafie Salleh's death on 11 September 2019.

After some consideration by President Anwar Ibrahim, he appointed Mohd Zin as the 7th National Chief Scout of Malaysia in 2023.

Mohd Zin elected as one of the members for the current Asia-Pacific Region Scout Committee from 2022 until 2028.

== Honours ==
=== Honours of Malaysia ===
- Malaysia
  - Officer of the Order of the Defender of the Realm (KMN) (2000)
  - Companion of the Order of Loyalty to the Crown of Malaysia (JSM) (2005)
- Malacca
  - Knight Commander of the Exalted Order of Malacca (DCSM) – Datuk Wira (2026)
  - Member of the Exalted Order of Malacca (DSM) (2001)
- Selangor
  - Knight Commander of the Order of the Crown of Selangor (DPMS) – Dato' (2005)
- Malaysian Armed Forces
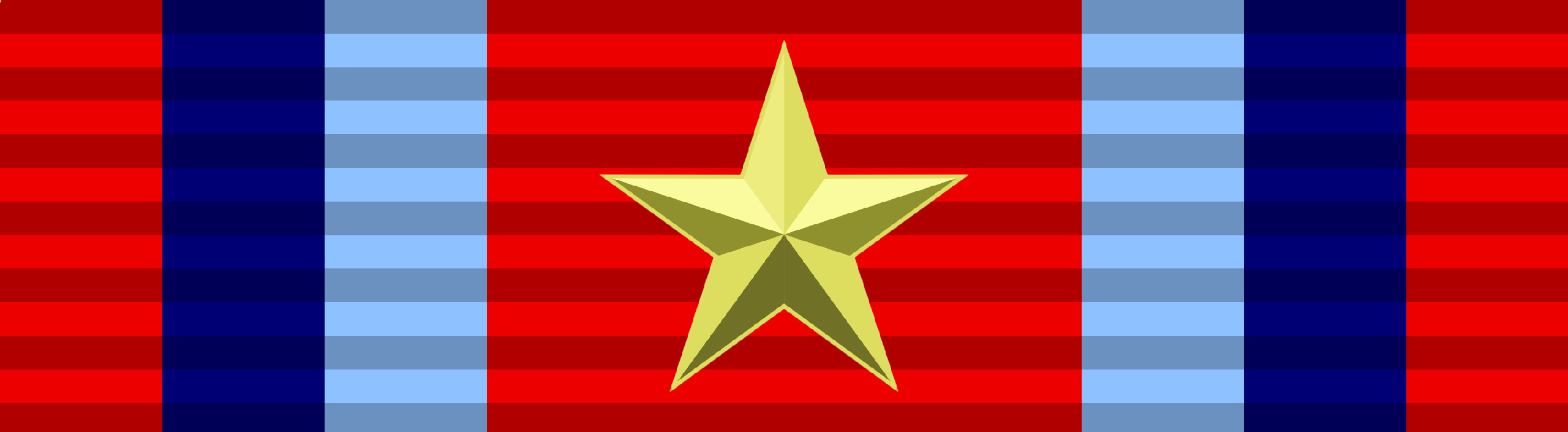
  - Officer of The Most Gallant Order of Military Service (KAT) (1996)
  - Warrior of The Most Gallant Order of Military Service (PAT) (2004)

=== Foreign honours ===
- Indonesia
  - Lencana Satyawira Utama Pramuka (2023)

=== Others ===
- King's Scout Award (1971)
