= Józef Pukowiec =

Polish teacher, scoutmaster, and resistance member (1904–1942)

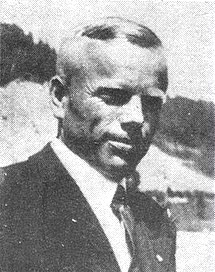

Józef Pukowiec codename: Chmura, Pukoc (14 September 1904 in Świętochłowice – 14 August 1942 in Katowice) was a Polish teacher, scoutmaster, and Polish resistance activist during the Second World War.

Pukowiec was from 1927 scoutmaster (harcmistrz) of the hufiec of Rybnik, from 1939 scoutmaster of the "Silesian Banner ZHP".

He was finally arrested in 1940 and imprisoned in the German concentration camp Auschwitz. He was later transported to a prison in Katowice, where he was tortured and murdered.

== See also ==
- Szare Szeregi
