= Pkharuddin Ghazali =

Director-General of Education (Malaysia) (born 1963)

Yang Berbahagia Datuk Pkharuddin Ghazali PJN DBNS PMC
- ڤخرالدين غزالي

Director-General of Education
- In office 23 September 2022 – 6 November 2023
- Monarch: Abdullah Ahmad Shah
- Prime Minister: Ismail Sabri Yaakob (2021–2022); Anwar Ibrahim (since 2022)
- Minister: Mohd Radzi Md Jidin (2021–2022); Fadhlina Sidek (since 2022)
- Preceded by: Nor Zamani Abdol Hamid
- Succeeded by: Azman Adnan

Personal details
- Born: Pkharuddin bin Ghazali @ Mat Jali; 1963 (age 62–63) Kampung Selising, Pasir Puteh, Kelantan, Malaysia
- Education: University of Malaya (BSc)
- Occupation: Civil servant
- Profession: Teacher

Pkharuddin bin Ghazali @ Mat Jali (Jawi: ڤخرالدين بن غزالي @ مد جالي; born 1963) is a civil servant and teacher who served as the 19th Director-General of Education since 23 September 2022 to 6 November 2023.

== Early life and education ==
Pkharuddin was born in Kampung Selising, Pasir Puteh, Kelantan, Malaysia in 1963. He has nine siblings and is the fourth child in his family.

Pkharuddin started studying at Bukit Jawa National School and Sultan Alam Shah School. He was a member of the scouts during his school days and was successfully awarded the highest achievement in Persekutuan Pengakap Malaysia (PPM) which is the King's Scout Award in 1981. After that, he continued his studies at the University of Malaya by taking the Foundation of Science program at the Centre for Foundation Studies, University of Malaya. He has a Bachelor of Science (Honours) degree specializing in Geography from University of Malaya and a Teaching Diploma before starting his career as a teacher.

== Career ==
Pkharuddin started his service as a teacher at King George V Secondary School, Seremban, Negeri Sembilan on 1 August 1989.

Pkharuddin has served in various ministry organizations throughout his 34 years of service including as assistant director of the Assessment and Examination Sector at the Examination Board, Director and deputy director at Negeri Sembilan State Department of Education, Examination Syndicate Director of the Education Ministry, Principal at Sekolah Menengah Kebangsaan Taman Semarak, Nilai, Negeri Sembilan, Deputy Director-General of Education (Policy and Curriculum) and 19th Director-General of Education.

On 23 September 2022, the Ministry of Education announced that he was appointed as Director-General of Education to replace Nor Zamani Abdol Hamid, who retired on 29 July 2022. Recently, he was retired on 6 November 2023 as Director-General of Education.

== Honours ==
=== Honours of Malaysia ===
- Malaysia
  - Commander of the Order of Meritorious Service (PJN) – Datuk (2023)
- Negeri Sembilan
  - Knight of the Order of Loyal Service to Negeri Sembilan (DBNS) – Dato' (2019)

=== Others ===
- King's Scout Award (1981)
- Anugerah Inspirasi CUEPACS (2023)

== Lihat juga ==
- Ministry of Education (Malaysia)
- King's Scout (Scouts Association of Malaysia)
