= Eric Khoo Heng-Pheng =

Malaysian World Scout Committee member

Eric Khoo Heng-Pheng MCIM
- 顾兴平

Member of the World Scout Committee
- In office 2008–2014

Chairman of the Asia Pacific Regional Scout Committee
- In office 2004–2007

Assistant National Chief Commissioner of the Scouts Association of Malaysia
- In office ???–???

Personal details
- Born: Khoo Heng-Pheng; 17 April 1956 Tengkera, Malacca, Malaysia
- Died: 13 January 2014 (aged 57)
- Resting place: Malacca Christian Cemetery, Cheng, Malacca, Malaysia
- Occupation: Consultant, company director

Eric Khoo Heng-Pheng (Chinese: 顾兴平; 17 April 1956 – 13 January 2014) was one of 12 elected volunteer members of the World Scout Committee, the main executive body of the World Organization of the Scout Movement, and Chairman of its Asia Pacific Regional Scout Committee, elected in 2001. He was elected at the 38th World Scout Conference in South Korea for a six-year term.

== Early life ==
Khoo was from Tengkera, Malacca, Malaysia. He was a company director in Petaling Jaya, Selangor, and consultant for public relations and marketing. His business activities involved logistics, engineering, warehouse and property development. He was a member of the Royal Commonwealth Society and the Chartered Institute of Marketing.

== Scouting ==
Khoo joined Scouting in 1965 at the age of nine as a Cub Scout and earned his King's Scout award in 1973. He has served as a Rover Scout leader, Scout Leader at the Maz International School, Chairman of the 25th Asia Pacific Region Scout Jamboree in Thailand in 2006, and Assistant National Chief Commissioner of the Scouts Association of Malaysia, as well as various positions in the King Scout's Association of Malaysia.

Khoo attended the 1999 35th World Scout Conference in Durban, South Africa, as well as the 2002 36th World Scout Conference in Greece and the 37th World Scout Conference in Tunisia.

== Awards ==
Khoo was awarded:

- The Distinguished Service Award from the Scouts Association of Malaysia.
- The Distinguished Service Cross from the Scout Association of Hong Kong.
- The President's Scout Award from the Boy Scouts of the Philippines.
- The Golden Rhinoceros Award from the Nepal Scouts.
- The Silver Eagle Award from the Scout Association of Japan.
- The Distinguished Service Award from the Singapore Scout Association.
- The White Tiger Award from the Bangladesh Scouts.
- The Distinguished Service Award from Gerakan Pramuka.

== Death ==
He died on 13 January 2014 from a heart attack.

== See also ==
- King's Scout (Scouts Association of Malaysia)
- Association of Top Achiever Scouts (ATAS)
