= Gábor Bodnár =

Hungarian musician, composer and university professor

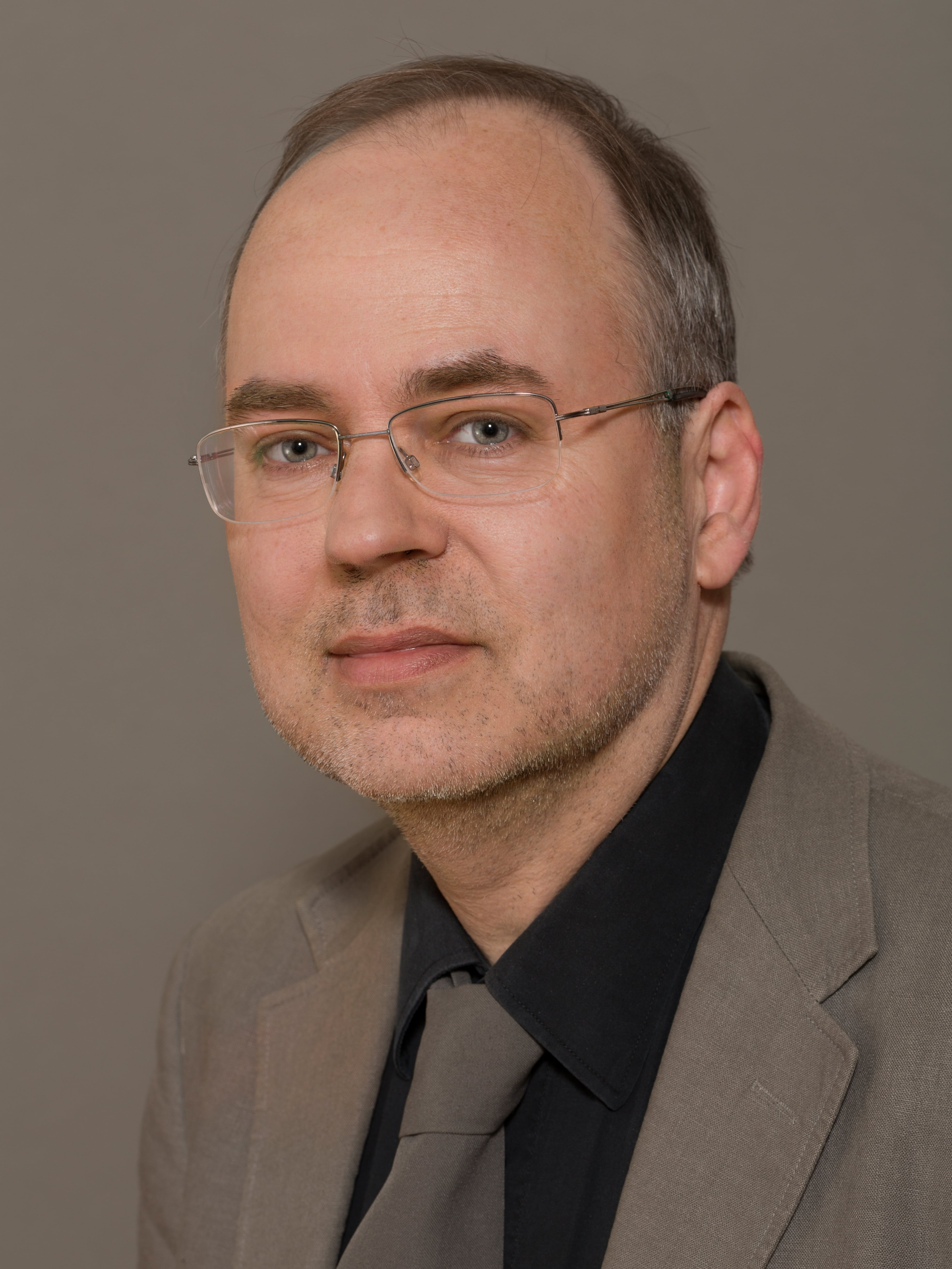

Background information
- Born: May 25, 1961 (age 64); Budapest, Hungary

Gábor Bodnár (born 25 May 1961) is a musician and university professor, currently serving as the director of the Institute for Art Mediation and Music at the Faculty of Humanities, Eötvös Loránd University (ELTE).

== Biography ==
=== Academic background ===
After completing his studies in composition and bassoon at Béla Bartók Conservatory in Budapest, Bodnár graduated from the Franz Liszt Academy of Music as a music theory teacher and composer. He obtained his doctoral degree at the same institution and later completed his habilitation at Eötvös Loránd University (ELTE), focusing on topics in music theory and music aesthetics.

=== Academic career ===
Since 1985, Bodnár has been a lecturer at Eötvös Loránd University (ELTE), initially at the Teacher Training College and later at the Faculty of Humanities (BTK). From 2007, he served as the head of the Department of Music, and since 2019, he has been the director of the Institute for Art Mediation and Music. He was appointed full professor in 2018.

The subjects Bodnár teaches include: music theory, music history; instrumentation, score reading and continuo; vocal and choral accompaniment, chamber music. In English, he teaches music theory and music semiotics. He supervises doctoral students at ELTE's Doctoral School of Philosophy, Education, Linguistics, and History, and serves as a reviewer for both doctoral and habilitation theses. He is the founder and active member of several academic workshops and initiated the institute's talent development and learning support program. His students have earned significant achievements at the National Scientific Students' Associations Conferences (OTDK), including the prestigious Pro Arte and Pro Scientia Gold Medals.

In addition to teaching, Bodnár is a member of various faculty committees and contributes to curriculum development. He has led the design of degree programs and professional modules, including heading national-level academic consortia in this field.

=== Professional and public activities ===
Bodnár has held various roles in several professional organizations, including the Art Mediation Committee of the Hungarian Rectors’ Conference (serving as co-chair and later chair between 2011 and 2021), and the Arts and Art Science Section of the National Scientific Students' Council (OTDT), where he has been co-chair since 2020 and served as executive president of the 36th OTDK. He is also a board member of the Psalmus Humanus Association for Arts Education.

Bodnár is a regular participant and speaker at both Hungarian and international conferences – including events in Europe and Seoul – and is one of the founders of the ELTE Arts Education Conference / ELTE Workshop for Arts Education series, serving on its scientific and organizing committees. In addition, he is a member of the advisory board of Parlando journal and editor of several academic volumes. Outside of university teaching, he has taught in music schools and also worked at the Hungarian Institute for Culture, frequently chairing juries at various events, particularly in connection with his work at the Institute and with the OTDT.

=== Performing and creative artistic activity ===
As a pianist and continuo player, Bodnár has performed with various choirs and chamber ensembles, primarily with the choirs of the Institute for Art Mediation and Music. He has taken part in international tours, festivals, and competitions – earning grand prizes, category wins, and placements – in countries including Austria, Belgium, the Czech Republic, France, Japan, Germany, Italy, Russia, Switzerland, Slovakia, and Tunisia.

In Hungary, Bodnár participated for nearly 30 years in youth and adult concerts organized by the Philharmonia as well as numerous ELTE events. With several ensembles, he also recorded CD albums. As a composer, he primarily writes commissioned works in various styles. A complete list of his compositions can be found in the Hungarian Scientific Works Database (MTMT).
