= Mahmoud el-Alamy =

Mohamed Larbi Alami
- Known for: President of the Fédération Nationale du Scoutisme Marocain, 131st Bronze Wolf

Mohamed Larbi Alami
- محمد العربي العلمي

President of the Fédération Nationale du Scoutisme Marocain

Mohamed Larbi Alami (Arabic: محمد العربي العلمي; Berber languages: ⵎⴰⵀⵎⵓⴷ ⵍⵄⴰⵍⴰⵎⵉ) served as President of the Fédération Nationale du Scoutisme Marocain.

In 1978, he was awarded the 131st Bronze Wolf, the only distinction of the World Organization of the Scout Movement, awarded by the World Scout Committee for exceptional services to world Scouting.

After independence, he was appointed ambassador of Morocco to Afghanistan, Tunisia, Lebanon, Iran then in Saudi Arabia and Yemen
