= Director General of Education (Malaysia) =

Senior Executive in the Malaysian Department of Education

- Ketua Pengarah Pendidikan Malaysia

- Incumbent; Dr. Mohd Azam Ahmad since 7 July 2025
- Ministry of Education
- Style: Yang Berbahagia (The Honourable)
- Reports to: Ministry of Education (Malaysia)
- Seat: Putrajaya
- Appointer: Minister of Education (Malaysia)
- Formation: 1959
- First holder: Joseph Norman Davies
- Website: www.moe.gov.my

The current Malaysian Director General of Education is Dr. Mohd Azam Ahmad, since 7 July 2025.

== List of Director General of Education ==
The following is a list of former and current Director General of Education.

No.	Director General of Education		Term of office	
No.	Portrait	Name (Birth–Death)	Took office	Left office
1		Joseph Norman Davies (Unknown)	1959	1959
2		D.H. Christie (Unknown)	1960	1960
3		Aminuddin Baki (1926–1965)	1961	1965
4		Hamdan Sheikh Tahir (1921–2005)	1966	1976
5		Murad Mohamed Noor (1930–2008)	1976	1985
6		Abdul Rahman Arshad (1936–2020)	1985	1991
7		Asiah Abu Samah (b. 1937)	1991	1993
8		Wan Mohd Zahid Mohd Noordin (1940–2022)	1993	1997
9		Matnor Daim (b. Unknown)	April 1997	April 1998
10		Abdul Shukor Abdullah (1944–2011)	April 1998	February 2001
11		Abdul Rafie Mahat (1946–2007)	February 2001	January 2005
12		Ahmad Sipon (b. 1951)	February 2005	July 2007
13		Alimuddin Mat Dom (b. Unknown)	16 July 2007	6 November 2010
14		Abdul Ghafar Mahmud (b. 1953)	8 November 2010	6 December 2013
15		Khair Mohamad Yusof (b. 1956)	8 December 2013	17 October 2017
16		Amin Senin (b. Unknown)	19 October 2017	21 December 2019
17		Habibah Abdul Rahim (b. Unknown)	10 January 2020	5 April 2021
18		Nor Zamani Abdol Hamid (b. Unknown)	22 June 2021	29 July 2022
19		Pkharuddin Ghazali (b. 1963)	23 September 2022	6 November 2023
20		Azman Adnan (b. 1965)	20 February 2024	4 July 2025
21		Dr. Mohd Azam Ahmad (b. 1967)	7 July 2025	Incumbent
