= List of highest scouting awards by country =

List of highest awards in Scouting
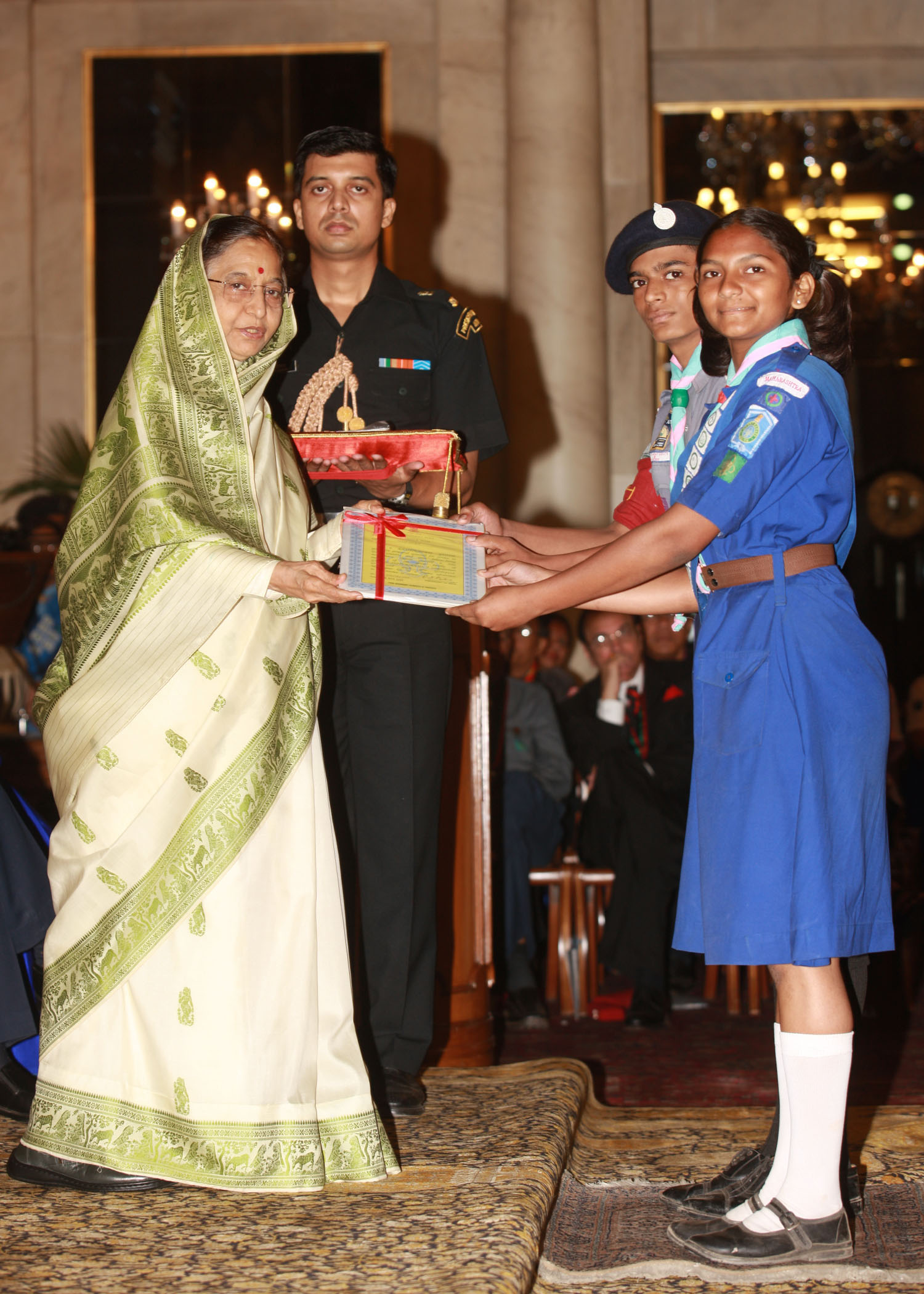
- Then President, Pratibha Patil presenting the Rashtrapati Scout and Guide Awards for the year 2007–2008 and 2008–2009, at the Rashtrapati Bhavan, in New Delhi on September 23, 2009

This list of highest awards in Scouting is an index to articles on notable awards given to youth members in the various national Scouting organizations. Most of these awards require a mastery of Scoutcraft and leadership and the performance of community service—only a small percentage of Scouts attain these awards. Many European nations do not have a rank system to avoid appearance of militarism.

== See also ==
- Age groups in Scouting and Guiding
- Association of Top Achiever Scouts
