= Co-curricular activity (Singapore) =

Extracurricular concept in Singapore

In Singapore, a co-curricular activity (CCA) is a non-academic activity that all students must undertake as part of their education. Introduced by the Ministry of Education (MOE), CCAs are strongly encouraged at the primary and post-secondary level but compulsory at secondary level. Students can choose from 4 categories: clubs and societies, physical sports, uniformed groups, and visual and performing arts. They may also start their own activities with the school’s approval. Anyone offering enrichment activities to schools must be registered with the MOE.

== Assessment and LEAPS 2.0 Framework ==
Student participation and attainment in secondary school CCAs are evaluated through the **LEAPS 2.0** framework. The framework tracks a student's development across four key domains—Leadership, Achievement, Participation, and Service—throughout their secondary education. Involvement and high achievements across these domains can qualify students for bonus admission points when applying to junior colleges, polytechnics, or institutes of technical education.

== Structure ==
CCA choices vary widely from school to school, although schools at each education level are required to conform to national standards prescribed for that level. Joining a CCA is strongly encouraged in the primary and post-secondary education level. However, in secondary schools, CCAs are treated more seriously. Students are required to pick at least one Core CCA to join in Secondary One, while being able to choose a second CCA if they wish. If the student excels and achieves results in their CCA, 1 to 2 'O' Level points are removed from the examination aggregate (a lower aggregate indicates better marks) at the end of the fourth/fifth year.

The activities available as CCA choices can be divided into 4 key categories:

- Clubs & Societies
- Physical Sports
- Uniformed Groups
- Visual & Performing Arts

== Competitions ==
Many CCA-related competitions are held in Singapore, creating a competitive environment which provide CCA groups an objective to work towards.

The Ministry of Education organises competitions for competitive sports at the zonal and national level, respectively the yearly Zonal and National Schools Competitions. MOE also organises the biennial Singapore Youth Festival (SYF) for the Aesthetics CCAs.

== List of CCAs ==
=== Student associations ===
- Prefectorial Board
- Students' Council
- The Peer Support Board
- The Junior and Senior Leaders Board
- The Civics Tutorial Council / Monitor / Class Leaders' Council
- The House Committee
- Technology Student Association (TSA)
- National Education Ambassadors
- Key Club
- Student Congress
- Environment Councillors
- Choir

=== Sports and games ===
- Aikido
- Archery
- Badminton
- Basketball
- Bowling
- Canoe Polo
- Climbing
- Cricket
- Cross country
- Fencing
- Flatwater canoe/kayak racing
- Floorball
- Football
- Fun Go Kart Club (only offered in ITE CW)
- Golf
- Gymnastics
  - Artistic gymnastics
  - Rhythmic gymnastics
  - Trampoline gymnastics
- Hockey
- Handball
- Netball
- Outdoor Adventure (usually in polytechnics)
- Rugby
- Sailing
- Sepak Takraw
- Shooting
  - Air pistol
  - Air rifle
- Skipping
- Softball
- Sports Invention Club
- Squash
- Swimming
- Table tennis
- Taekwondo
- Tchoukball
- Tennis
- Track and field
- Ultimate (Frisbee)
- Volleyball
- Water polo
- Wushu

=== Uniformed groups ===
- Boys' Brigade (BB)
- Girls' Brigade (GB)
- Girl Guides Singapore (GG)
  - Brownies
- National Cadet Corps (Air) (NCC Air)
- National Cadet Corps (Sea) (NCC Sea)
- National Cadet Corps (Land) (NCC Land)
- National Civil Defence Cadet Corps (NCDCC)
- National Police Cadet Corps (Land) (NPCC)
- Red Cross Youth (RCY)
- Singapore Scout Association (SSA)
- St. John Ambulance Brigade (SJAB)

=== Performing arts ===
- Angklung Ensemble
- Bands
  - Brass Band
  - Concert Band
  - Display Band
  - Marching band
  - Military band
  - Symphonic Band
  - Wind band
- Chinese orchestra
- Chinese Drama
- Choir
- Dance Clubs
  - Chinese Dance
  - Indian Dance
  - International Dance
  - Malay Dance
  - Modern Dance
- English Drama
- Gamelan
- General Music
- Guitar Ensemble
- Guzheng Ensemble
- Handbell Ensemble
- Harmonica and Keyboard Ensemble
- Harp Ensemble
- Indian Orchestra
- Percussion Band
- Piano Ensemble
- Orchestra
- String Ensemble
- Violin

Note that Band may either count as a uniformed group or a performing arts group.

=== Clubs and societies ===
- Advanced Mathematics Club
- AVA Club (Audio and Visual Aid)
- Art Club
- Astronomy Club
- Cabin Club (with Singapore Children's Society)
- Comics Club
- Chess Club
- Chinese Cultural Club
- Chinese Calligraphy Club
- Computer Club
- Culinary Club (One school only)
- Debate Club
- Drama Club
- English Calligraphy Club
- Entrepreneurship Club
- Environment Club
- First Aid Club
- Future Problem Solving Programme
- Game Designing Club
- Gardening Club
- Green Club
- Guitar Club
- Infocomm Club
- Interact Club
- Innovation Programme
- Indian Cultural Society
- Inventions Club
- Research Programme
- Robotics Club
- Language Club
- Library Club
- Mathematics Club
- Media Club
- Mind Sports Club
- Multimedia Club
- Outdoor Activities Club (OAC/ODAC)
- Philatelic Club
- Philosophy Club
- Photography Club
- Photoshop Club
- Robotics Club
- Science Club
- Singapore Youth Flying Club (SYFC)
- Scrabble Society
- Tactics Club
- Tamil Literary, Drama and Debate Society (TLDDS)
- Video Animation Club
- World Scholar's Cup (WSC)

In some schools, instead of separate clubs for Language, Debate and Drama (and even Culture), these domains are grouped under the heading of Language Debate and Drama Societies, an example of which is the English Literary Drama and Debate Society (ELDDS).
