= Corporal =

Military rank

Corporal is a military rank in use by the armed forces of many countries. It is also a police rank in some police services. The rank is usually the lowest ranking non-commissioned officer. In some militaries, the rank of corporal nominally corresponds to commanding a section or squad of soldiers (typically ranging from two to sixteen soldiers and called "corporal's guard").

The word is a contraction from the medieval Italian phrase capo corporale (transl. head of a body [of soldiers]). While most Indo-European languages use this contraction, West Iberian languages use cabo.

== NATO code ==
While the rank is used in a number of NATO countries, it is ranked differently depending on the country.

| NATO code | Country | English equivalent | |
| NATO code | Country | UK | US |
|---|---|---|---|
| OR-4 | Denmark, Germany, Latvia, Norway, Romania | Corporal | |
| OR-3 | Belgium, Canada, France, Luxembourg, Netherlands, Poland | Lance corporal | Private first class |
| OR-2 | Estonia, Italy, Portugal, Spain | Private | |

== Types ==
- Lance corporal
- Korporal
- First corporal
- Second corporal
- Master corporal
- Corporal major
- Corporal of horse
- Corporal of the field
- Staff corporal

== By country ==
=== Australia ===
Corporal is the second lowest of the non-commissioned officer ranks in the Australian Army, falling between lance-corporal and sergeant. A corporal is usually appointed as a section commander, and is in charge of 7–14 soldiers of private rank. Corporals are assisted by a second-in-command, usually a lance-corporal or senior private. A corporal within the artillery is known as a bombardier. Corporal is also a rank of the Royal Australian Air Force, being equal to both the Australian Army and Royal Air Force rank of corporal.

=== Belgium ===
The branches of the Belgian Armed Forces use three ranks of corporal: corporal (Dutch: korporaal, French: caporal), master corporal (Dutch: korporaal-chef, French: caporal-chef) and 1st master corporal (Dutch: 1ste korporaal-chef, French: 1e caporal-chef). Corporal is equivalent to NATO Rank Code OR-3, whereas master corporal and 1st master corporal are equivalent to OR-4. The rank immediately below corporal is 1st private and the rank directly above 1st master corporal is sergeant.

Units with a cavalry, artillery or Logistic Corps (Transport unit) tradition replace Corporal by "Brigadier".

The equivalent of these ranks in the Naval Component are quartermaster, chief quartermaster and 1st chief quartermaster.

=== Canada ===
Corporal is an Army and Air Force non-commissioned member rank of the Canadian Armed Forces. Its naval equivalent is sailor 1st class. It is senior to the rank of private and its naval equivalent sailor 2nd class, and junior to master corporal (caporal-chef) and its equivalent master sailor (matelot-chef). It is part of the cadre of junior non-commissioned officers, and one of the junior ranks. In French, the rank is caporal.

The rank insignia of a corporal is a two-bar chevron, point down, worn in gold thread on both upper sleeves of the service dress jacket; in rifle green (army) or dark blue (air force) thread on CADPAT slip-ons for operational dress; in old gold thread on blue slip-ons on other air force uniforms; and in gold metal and green enamel miniature pins on the collars of the army dress shirt and outerwear coats. On army ceremonial uniforms, it is usually rendered in gold braid (black for rifle regiments), on either both sleeves, or just the right, depending on unit custom.

Corporal is the first non-commissioned officer rank, and the lowest rank officially empowered to issue a lawful command. Corporals can lead troops if they have the formal qualifications to be promoted to master corporal but have not been promoted yet. However, the rank of corporal was severely downgraded after Unification, along with the attendant responsibilities. A corporal in the Canadian Army in 1967 had the same duties and responsibilities that a sergeant has today. In an infantry section, a corporal will sometimes command an assault team if a master corporal is leading the section or they are pending promotion to master corporal.

Another effect of Unification was to delete the appointments of lance-corporal and lance-sergeant (a corporal holding the acting rank of sergeant). The former is still common in other Commonwealth militaries.

Corporal is deemed to be the substantive rank of the members carrying the appointment of master corporal. On pay documents, corporal was formerly listed as "Cpl (A)" and master corporal as "Cpl (B)".

In rifle regiments, a distinction was historically drawn between a corporal and an acting corporal; The Queen's Own Rifles of Canada had a special insignia to distinguish between the two.

=== France ===
There are three ranks of corporal (French: caporal). In the French Army, these are not NCO ranks, but enlisted ones. The corporals are called "ranked" (gradés). Non-commissioned officers start at the rank of sergent.

| | OR-3 | |
| | Army | Air force |
|---|---|---|
| Shoulder | | |
| Camouflage | | |
| French | Caporal | |
| English translation | Corporal | |

In regiments with a cavalry tradition, using white insignia, and artillery, brigadier is used instead.

=== Germany ===
Corporal or Korporal was the most junior NCO grade in many German partial states of Deutscher Bund, before the term was replaced by the word Unteroffizier in the middle of the 19th century.

In September 2021, the Bundeswehr reimplemented the grade of Korporal, but this time as a senior enlisted rank below NCO level. Additionally, a completely new rank was created with the grade of Stabskorporal what is the most senior enlisted rank now. Both ranks are classified OR-4 in the NATO rank code system. In the Bundeswehr, both ranks share paygrade A6 with the junior NCO rank Stabsunteroffizier.

=== India ===
Corporal in the Indian Air Force is a Non-commissioned officer (NCO) rank. Corporals assist in maintaining discipline, overseeing technical or operational tasks in their unit, and serves as a link between senior JCOs and junior airmen.

=== Ireland ===
Corporal Ceannaire
- Army and Air Corps insignia
- Country: Ireland
- Service branch: Irish Army; Irish Air Corps
- Rank group: Non-commissioned officer
- Pay grade: €805.38 – €847.45
- Formation: 1924
- Next higher rank: Sergeant
- Next lower rank: Private, 3 star (army); Airman, 3 star (air corps)
- Equivalent ranks: Leading seaman

Corporal (Irish: Ceannaire) is the lowest rank of non-commissioned officer within the Irish Army and Air Corps. The Naval Service equivalent is leading seaman.

==== Army ====
The main role of an infantry corporal is either to command a section as the section commander or to command the fire support group as the second in command of the section. All corporals are qualified instructors on drill, section weapons, and fieldcraft.

In the Artillery Corps, the corporal is normally assigned to a gun detachment as a layer, or a detachment commander. Artillery corporals can also find themselves in charge of the battery signals section.

The army rank insignia consists of two winged chevrons (or "stripes"), the dress uniform being red chevrons with a yellow border.

==== Air Corps ====
Before 1994, the Air Corps was considered part of the army and wore army uniforms with distinct corps badges but the same rank insignia. With the introduction of a unique Air Corps blue uniform in 1994, the same rank markings in a white colour were worn, before the introduction of a new two-chevron badge with wing rank marking.

=== Israel ===
All Jewish, Druze and Circassian conscripts must start their compulsory service at 18 (unless they receive a deferment); Christians, Muslims, and Circassians may volunteer at 17 or older. Enlisted male conscripts serve for 32 months (2 years and 8 months) and female conscripts serve for 24 months (2 years). In the IDF enlisted ranks are earned by means of time in service (pazam), rather than by a particular post or assignment. After 4 to 12 months the conscript is promoted to rav turai (corporal), after 18 to 20 months promoted to samal, and after 24 to 32 months is promoted to samal rishon (This means that female conscripts reach no higher than samal during their compulsory service, unless they serve in combat positions or volunteer for longer terms).

=== Italy ===

A soldier used to get promoted from private (soldato) to corporal rank (caporale) after 3 months of service until 2014, After 2014 they have to pass a selection to be promoted to corporal. The title was used as a senior office in the Italian Kingdom during World War II.

=== New Zealand ===
The New Zealand Defence Force awards the corporal rank to soldiers or airmen after 6 or 7 years of service. There is substantial responsibility on the part of a corporal in the New Zealand Army and Royal New Zealand Air Force. They usually command a small team and work closely with their sergeants. A pay increase is also given.

Like their British, Canadian and Australian counterparts, they wear two chevrons to distinguish their rank.

Corporals have what is termed 'power of arrest', and is impressed on recruits in RNZAF basic training. Basically, this power means that any airman or private disobeying or ignoring an order from a corporal will be subject to military arrest by that individual. Power of arrest is used by higher ranks to enforce their orders, corporal in the RNZAF being the lowest rank with this power.

=== Philippines ===
In the Armed Forces of the Philippines, the rank Corporal is locally called as Kabo. It is currently being used by both the Philippine Army and the Philippine Marine Corps. It stand above the rank of private first class and below sergeant.

The Philippine Revolutionary Army also used corporal as part of their ranks during the Philippine Revolution and the Philippine–American War. It is the lowest enlisted personnel rank on the service, below the rank of sergeant.

As of 8 February 2019, a new ranking classification for the Philippine National Police was adopted, eliminating confusion of old ranks. The rank of corporal is included on the new ranking classification. It is the second from the bottom, placing above the rank of Patrolman and below police staff sergeant.

=== Poland ===
In the Polish Land Forces, the rank of kapral is the lowest rank in the NCO corps (OR-3 in NATO code). Most commonly the rank is held by a NCO commanding an infantry squad, tank or gun crew, or a similar unit. The equivalent rank in the Polish Navy is mat.

As with many other military ranks, direct comparison between various armies might be misleading. Before World War II, the Polish Army's kapral was more or less equivalent to the British rank of lance corporal, while the British rank of corporal was named plutonowy (lit. platooner). In modern times, the rank is still equivalent to a UK lance corporal or a private first class in the U.S. Army (OR-3), while the British and American rank of corporal (OR-4) is equivalent to the Polish rank of starszy kapral (lit. 'senior corporal'), which was introduced in 1971.

Historically, the rank was first introduced in Poland in the 17th century, together with mercenary troops of Italian origin. In foreign troops on the royal payroll, a kapral commanded four ranks of musketeers or part of a company of pikemen. In the 20th century, between the world wars, the rank of corporal was held by both conscripted NCOs and professional soldiers alike. This was changed after World War II, when the Polish Army was under Soviet command and the rank of kapral was modified to resemble that of Soviet junior sergeant, reserved for conscripted NCOs. In the modern Polish Army, the rank is exclusively reserved for professional soldiers.

The insignia of kapral (worn on shoulder straps or badge above breast pocket) are two bars.

=== Portugal ===
The Portuguese Navy has the rank of cabo da Armada (corporal of the Navy). All other branches of the Portuguese Armed Forces have several ranks of corporal (cabo in Portuguese). The Portuguese Army and the Portuguese Air Force have the ranks of segundo cabo (second corporal), primeiro cabo (first corporal) and cabo-adjunto (corporal adjudant). The National Republican Guard has the ranks of cabo (corporal), cabo-chefe (chief corporal) and cabo-mor (corporal-major).

The several ranks of corporal correspond to the several pay grades, above that of private, that can be reached inside the enlisted rank professional category of the Army, the Air Force and the National Republican Guard. In the Navy, the rank of cabo da Armada is the highest pay grade in the enlisted rank category.

=== Russia ===
The rank of corporal (Russian: капрал) existed in the Russian Army from 1647 to 1798, when it was replaced with that of non-commissioned officer (Russian: унтер-офицер, from German: Unteroffizier, literally "sub-officer"). Soviet and modern Russian armies have the rank of "yefreytor" (derived from the German Gefreiter) as the highest rank of enlisted personnel, below lance (or junior) sergeant (Russian: младший сержант) which are assigned as squad leaders.

=== Singapore ===
==== Singapore Armed Forces ====
The Corporal rank in the Singapore Armed Forces is between the rank of Lance Corporal and Corporal First Class. National Servicemen are usually promoted to this rank within the 2nd year of their service.

Prior to 1992, the SAF followed the British model where corporals were non-commissioned officers often holding the appointment of section leader. Today, a corporal is not a specialist (NCO-equivalent). Corporals are usually given higher responsibilities/ appointments as a section 2IC, or 2nd-in-command.

==== Home Team ====
In the Singapore Police Force, Singapore Civil Defence Force, Singapore Prison Service, Immigration and Checkpoints Authority and Singapore Customs, a corporal is a rank below sergeant.

The rank insignia for a corporal is two chevrons pointing downwards.

==== Uniformed youth organisations ====
For the National Cadet Corps (NCC), the rank of Corporal is below the rank of Third Sergeant, and above the rank of Lance Corporal. For the National Police Cadet Corps (NPCC) and the National Civil Defence Cadet Corps (NCDCC), the rank of Corporal is below the rank of Sergeant, and above the rank of Lance Corporal.

For NCC, the rank insignia is same as that of an SAF CPL, except that the letters 'NCC' are below the insignia, so as to differentiate NCC cadets from SAF personnel. As for NPCC and NCDCC, the rank insignia is two pointed-down chevrons with the letters 'NPCC' and 'NCDCC' below the insignia, so as to differentiate NPCC and NCDCC cadets from Singapore Police Force and Singapore Civil Defence Force personnel, respectively.

The rank of Corporal is generally awarded to cadets in Secondary Two, or Secondary Three. Corporals, after being appointed, are given training to command a squad.

=== Ukraine ===
Since 2015, the Corporal (Ukrainian: капрал, romanized: kapral), was introduced in the National Police of Ukraine, that is a special rank of junior quarterdeck. It corresponds to former junior sergeant of militia. Also since 2018–19, the Corporal (Ukrainian: капрал, romanized: kapral) was introduced in the Court Security Service (Ukrainian: Служба судової охорони, romanized: Sluzhba Sudovoi ohorony), and the DBR (Ukrainian: Державне бюро розслідувань, romanized: State Bureau of Investigation) as a special rank of junior quarterdeck.

=== United Kingdom ===
Corporal
- Army, marine and RAF insignia
- Country: United Kingdom
- Service branch: British Army; Royal Marines; Royal Air Force
- Abbreviation: Cpl
- NATO rank code: OR-4
- Next higher rank: Sergeant
- Next lower rank: Lance-corporal
- Equivalent ranks: Leading hand or leading rate

The rank of corporal, which falls between lance-corporal and sergeant is used by the British Army, Royal Marines, and Royal Air Force.

The badge of rank is a two-bar chevron (also known as "stripes", "tapes", or "hooks"). A corporal's role varies between regiments; but, in the standard infantry role, a corporal commands a section, with a lance-corporal as second-in-command (2ic). When the section is split into fire teams, they command one each. In the Royal Armoured Corps, a corporal commands an individual tank. Their duties therefore largely correspond to those of staff sergeants in the United States Army and corporals are often described as the "backbone" of the British Army.

In the Household Cavalry, all non-commissioned ranks are designated as different grades of corporal up to regimental corporal major (who is a warrant officer class 1). There is no effective actual rank of corporal, however, and the ranks progress directly from lance-corporal to lance-corporal of horse (who is effectively equivalent to a corporal; technically, a lance-corporal of horse holds the rank of corporal but is automatically give the appointment of lance-corporal of horse). Similarly, in the Foot Guards and in the Honourable Artillery Company, every Corporal is appointed as a lance-sergeant meaning they wear three chevrons rather than the regular two, with a lance-corporal wearing two chevrons instead of one: this is sometimes said to have originated with Queen Victoria who did not like "her own guardsmen" having only one chevron.

Royal Artillery corporals are called bombardiers; although, until 1920, the Royal Artillery had corporals and bombardier was a lower rank. The rank of second corporal existed in the Royal Engineers and Royal Army Ordnance Corps until 1920.

A common nickname for a corporal is a "full screw", with lance-corporals being known as "lance-jacks".

Corporal is the lowest NCO rank in the Royal Air Force (aside from the RAF Regiment who have lance-corporals), coming between junior technician or Senior aircraftman technician and sergeant in the technical trades, or senior aircraftman and sergeant in the non-technical trades. Between 1950 and 1964, corporals in technical trades were known as "corporal technicians" and wore their chevrons point up.

In the Royal Navy, the equivalent to corporal is leading hand or leading rate.

The Army Cadet Force, Combined Cadet Force, Air Training Corps, Royal Marines sections of the Sea Cadet Corps and the Combined Cadet Force all have the rank of corporal, reflecting the structure of their parent service; therefore it is the second NCO rank of the ACF, CCF (including the RAF Section, which has the rank of lance corporal) and marine cadets, and the first NCO rank in the ATC.

=== United States ===
Corporal
- Army corporal

- Marine Corps corporal
- Country: United States
- Service branch: United States Army; United States Marine Corps
- Abbreviation: CPL (Army); Cpl. (USMC)
- Rank: Enlisted
- NATO rank code: OR-4
- Pay grade: E-4
- Next higher rank: Sergeant
- Next lower rank: Private first class (Army); Lance corporal (Marines)
- Equivalent ranks: Petty officer third class (Navy/Coast Guard); Senior airman (Air Force); Specialist 4 (Space Force)

==== United States Army ====
In the U.S. Army, corporal is preceded by the first three forms of private and the rank of specialist. A corporal rank shares the same pay grade (E-4) as a specialist, though unlike a specialist, a corporal is a non-commissioned officer and may direct the activities of other soldiers.

The rank of corporal dates to the Revolutionary War. Each company in the Continental Army was divided into four squads, with the enlisted contingent of each comprising a sergeant, a corporal, and nineteen privates. The corporal, along with the superior sergeant, were responsible for the care, discipline, and training of their men. After the Civil War, U.S. Army infantry strategy increasingly focused on units below the company level. In 1891, a squad was defined as an eight-man unit led by a corporal, a definition which held through World War I until the eve of the U.S. entry into World War II.

In 1940, with the recognition of the increasing importance of small-unit tactics, the size of the squad was increased to twelve men, now led by a sergeant, with a corporal as assistant squad leader. In February 1944, the squad leader became a staff sergeant, assisted by a sergeant, dropping the corporal from the infantry company's chain of command. As a result of this "steady inflation" of the NCO corps, writes historian Ernest F. Fisher, "the rank of corporal came to mean very little in a line organization, though the corporal was in theory and by tradition a combat leader." After the Korean War, squad leaders were further promoted to sergeant first class (E-7), and the "once-honored rank of corporal sank into oblivion."

In the modern Army, a fireteam is designated to be led by a sergeant (E-5), but it may be led by a corporal if necessary. In the 21st century, the rank of corporal has been relatively rare, often bypassed by specialists who were promoted directly to sergeant. However, from July 2021 until May 2024, specialists who were graduates of the Basic Leader Course (BLC) and who had been recommended for promotion were to become corporals before further promotion; conversely corporals who had not yet graduated from BLC will be laterally reassigned as specialists until they have graduated from BLC. No change in pay is involved, but corporals are expected to lead, teach, and mentor their teams. During this same time period the army was requiring Specialists be promoted to Corporal before being promoted to Sergeant. In May 2024, the army removed the requirement to complete BLC in order to be promoted to Sergeant (E-5) (thus also Corporal) and moved it to Staff Sergeant (E-6).

==== United States Marine Corps ====
Corporal is the fourth enlisted rank in the U.S. Marine Corps, ranking immediately above lance corporal and immediately below sergeant. The Marine Corps, unlike the Army, has no other rank at the pay grade of E-4. Corporal is the lowest grade of non-commissioned officer in the U.S. Marine Corps, though promotion to corporal traditionally confers a significant jump in authority and responsibility compared to promotion from private through lance corporal. Marine infantry corporals generally serve as "fireteam leaders", leading a four-man team or weapons crew of similar size (e.g., assault weapons squad, medium machine gun team, or LWCMS mortar squad).

In practice, however, the billet of fire team leader is generally held by a lance corporal, while corporals serve in the squad leader billet that would normally be held by a sergeant (E-5) in infantry units. In support units, corporals generally serve in "journeyman" level roles in which they direct the activities of junior Marines and provide technical supervision, on a very limited scope, under the direct supervision of a sergeant or SNCO.

Due to its emphasis on small-unit tactics, its infantry-centric ethos, and its tradition of empowering junior NCOs to exercise first-level leadership, the U.S. Marine Corps' Tables of Organization (TOs) usually places corporals (as well as sergeants and staff sergeants) in billets where other services would normally have higher ranking NCOs in authority. For example, the USMC Table of Organization "billet" rank for rifle fire team leader, rifle squad leader, and rifle platoon sergeant is corporal (E-4), sergeant (E-5), and staff sergeant (E-6), respectively. However, the same positions (Table of Organization and Equipment "slots") in US Army infantry units are one grade higher and, except in fire teams (both services with four men in each team), the equivalent Army units are smaller (viz., USMC rifle squad and rifle platoon – 13 men and 43 men, respectively, vice US Army rifle squad and rifle platoon – 9 men and 34 men, respectively). Specifically, for the Army rifle units, the rank of the fire team, squad leader, and platoon sergeant are: sergeant (E-5), staff sergeant (E-6), and sergeant first class (E-7), respectively. Similarly, the term "strategic corporal" refers to the special responsibilities conferred upon a Marine corporal over against the normal responsibilities, and usual authority, of service members in the grade of E-4 in the other branches of the U.S. Armed Forces.

Drill instructors in the United States Marine Corps normally hold ranks from sergeant (E-5) through gunnery sergeant (E-7), though per Marine Corps Orders 1326.6 (2019), "Mature and otherwise qualified Corporals may be assigned, with an approved exception to policy."

The history of the rank of corporal in the USMC roughly parallels that of the U.S. Army until 1942. From 1775 until WWII, the Marine Corps used essentially the same rank and organizational structure as its common British and colonial forebears with the Army, as well as the later Continental and U.S. armies. In 1942, as the Army modified its triangular division infantry organization to best fight in the European/North African/Middle Eastern Theatre the Marine Corps began modifying the triangular division plan to best employ its amphibious warfare doctrine in the Pacific Theatre. This meant that for the Corps, squad leaders would remain as sergeants and that the rifle squad would be sub-divided into three four-man fire teams each led by a corporal.

==== United States Air Force ====
USAF Corporal Insignia 1948–1951

When the United States Air Force was separated from the US Army in 1947, corporal (E-3) became the most junior NCO grade – below sergeant – of this newly created independent branch of the United States Armed Forces. It was replaced by Airman 2nd Class (E-3) in April 1952 respectively Airman 1st Class (E-3, previously E-4) in October 1967, both enlisted ranks below NCO level.

In the same process sergeant was first replaced by Airman 1st class in 1952 (E-4, becoming E-3 in 1967). The title sergeant returned in E-4 as lowest NCO rank from October 1967 to March 1991. From 1976, sergeant shared his pay grade with Senior airman (since then the most senior enlisted rank below NCO status), before phasing out in the late 1990s.

== Gallery ==
Caporal
(Arabic: عريف, romanized: Earif)
(Algerian Land Forces)

Korporaal
(French: Caporal)
(Belgian Land Component)

Caporal
(Benin Army)

Corporal
(Botswana Ground Force)

Caporal
(Burkina Faso Ground Forces)

Caporal
(Kirundi: Kaporari)
(Burundi Army)

Caporal
(Cameroon Ground Forces)

Corporal
(French: Caporal)
(Canadian Army)

Caporal
(Central African Ground Forces)

Caporal
(Chadian Ground Forces)

Caporal
(Comorian Army)

Caporal
(Land Forces of the DR Congo)

Caporal
(Congolese Ground Forces)

Korporal
(Royal Danish Army)

Caporal
(Djiboutian Army)

Kapral
(Estonian Land Forces)

Cabo
(Army of Equatorial Guinea)

Caporal
(French Army)

Caporal
(Gabonese Army)

Corporal
(Gambian National Army)

Korporal
(German Army)

Corporal
(Ghana Army)

Caporal
(Guinea Ground Forces)

Corporal
(Indian Air Force)

Caporale
(Italian Army)

Caporal
(Ivory Coast Ground Forces)

Corporal
(Kenya Army)

Kaprālis
(Latvian Land Forces)

Corporal
(Lesotho Army)

Corporal
(Liberian Ground Forces)

Corporal
(Libyan Army)

Caporal
(Luxembourg Army)

Caporal
(Madagascar Ground Forces)

Corporal
(Malawi Army)

Caporal
(Malian Army)

Caporal
(Royal Moroccan Army)

Cabo
(Mozambican Army)

Corporal
(Namibian Army)

Korporaal
(Royal Netherlands Army)

Caporal
(Niger Army)

Corporal
(Nigerian Army)

Korporal
(Norwegian Army)

Kapral
(Polish Land Forces)

Corporal
(Rwandan Land Forces)

Caporal
(Senegalese Army)

Corporal
(Seychelles Infantry Unit)

Corporal
(Sierra Leone Army)

Corporal
(South African Army)

Cabo
(Spanish Army)

Caporal
(Togolese Army)

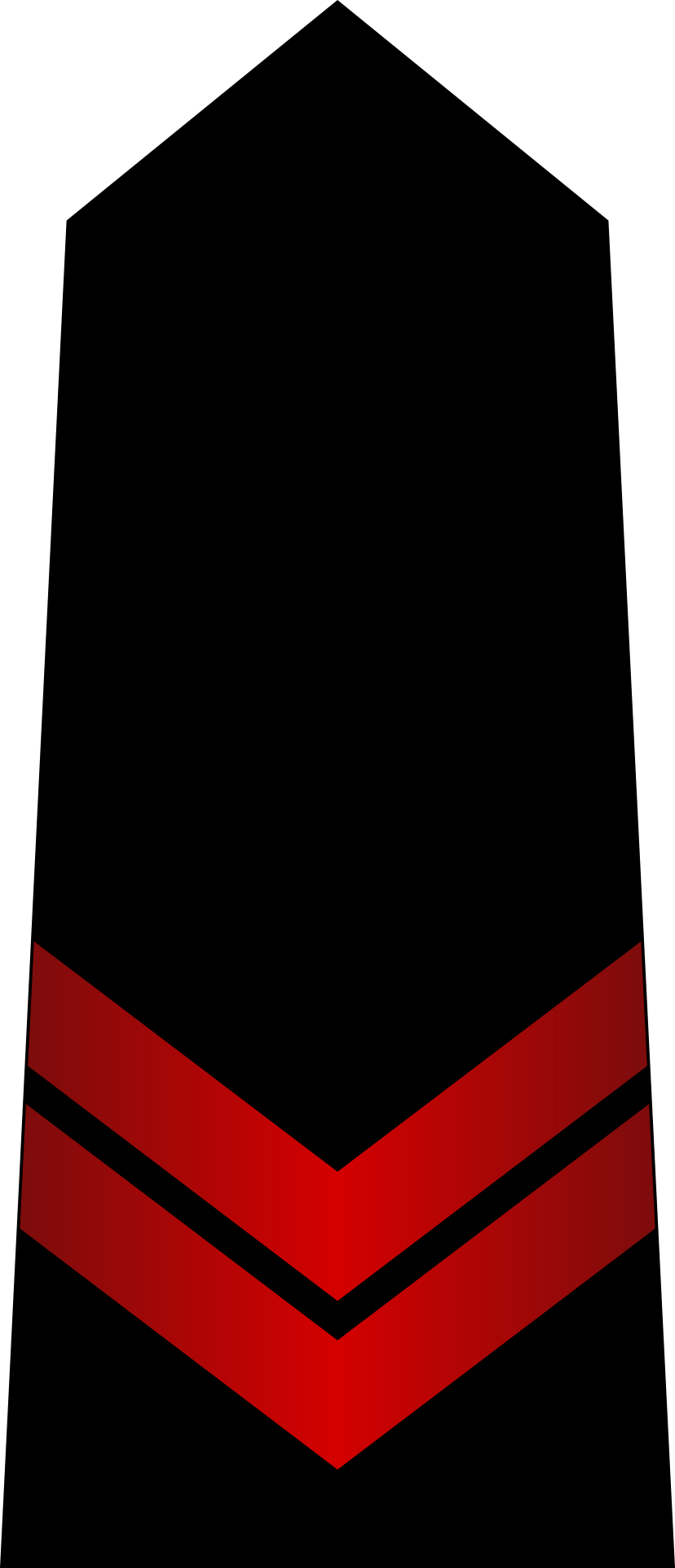
Caporal
(Arabic: رقيب, romanized: Raqib)
(Tunisian Army)

Corporal
(Ugandan Land Forces)

Corporal
(British Army)

Corporal
(United States Army)

Corporal
(United States Marine Corps)

Corporal
(Zambian Army)

Corporal
(Zimbabwe National Army)

== See also ==
- Corporal Jackie
- List of comparative military ranks
