= Scouting and Guiding in Singapore =

The Scout and Guide movement in Singapore is served by

- Girl Guides Singapore, member of the World Association of Girl Guides and Girl Scouts
- The Singapore Scout Association, member of the World Organization of the Scout Movement

== International Scouting units in Singapore ==
In addition, there are American Boy Scouts in Singapore, serving in Cub Scout Pack 3017 and Boy Scout Troop 07, chartered by the American Association of Singapore, and Boy Scout Troop 102, chartered by the Church of Jesus Christ of Latter-Day Saints. These groups are organized under the Direct Service Center in Irving, Texas, USA. Scouts et Guides de France is also active in Singapore.

== See also ==
- Singapore Scout Association
- Girl Guides Singapore
- Cub Scouts (Singapore Scout Association)
