= Staff sergeant =

Military rank in various military forces

Staff sergeant is a rank of non-commissioned officer used in the armed forces of many countries. It is also a police rank in some police services.

== History of title ==
In origin, certain senior sergeants were assigned to administrative, supervisory, or other specialist duties as part of the staff of a British Army regiment. As such they held seniority over sergeants who were members of a battalion or company, and were paid correspondingly increased wages. Their seniority was indicated by a crown worn above the three sergeant's stripes on their uniform rank markings.

== Military rank ==
=== Australia ===
In the Australian Army and Cadets, the rank of staff sergeant was being phased out from about 2015. It was usually held by the company quartermaster sergeant or the holders of other administrative roles. Staff sergeants are always addressed as "Staff Sergeant" or "Staff", never as "Sergeant", as it degrades their rank. "Chief" is another nickname though this is only used for the company chief clerk (in some instances the chief clerk role can be filled by another non-commissioned rank (but not warrant officer) and still be referred to as "Chief"). A staff sergeant ranks above sergeant and below warrant officer class 2.

=== Canada ===
In the pre-Unification Canadian Army, the rank of staff sergeant existed until 1968 when the Unification of the Royal Canadian Navy, Canadian Army and Royal Canadian Air Force into the Canadian Armed Forces occurred. Post-unification, the Canadian Armed Forces replaced the rank with that of Warrant Officer.

The rank is used by the Royal Canadian Mounted Police and other police services throughout Canada.

=== Norway ===
In the Norwegian Defence Forces, the tasks and responsibilities of the staff sergeant (Norwegian: Stabssersjant) are not clear; quite recently, in January 2016, Norway replaced their old rank system, and implemented a new, which is more adapted to other NATO members. In 1975, all of the Norwegian military branches abolished the system of using non-commissioned officers. Now, however, Norway is reintroducing the Non-Commissioned Officer Corps, allowing people to become officers without graduating from a military academy or having a university degree.

=== Philippines ===
The rank of staff sergeant is used by the Armed Forces of the Philippines. It is a non-commissioned officer rank currently used by Philippine Army, Philippine Air Force, and the Philippine Marine Corps (under the Philippine Navy). It is a rank positioned above sergeant and below the technical sergeant.

=== Singapore ===
==== Singapore Armed Forces ====
A staff sergeant (SSG) in the Singapore Armed Forces ranks above first sergeant and below master sergeant. It is the second most senior specialist rank. Staff sergeants are addressed as "Staff Sergeant" or "Staff", but never "Sergeant".

Staff sergeants may be appointed as company sergeant major if they are due for promotion to master sergeant. They are usually addressed as "CSM" in camp, although in the past they were referred to as "Encik", which is now used to address only warrant officers.

The rank insignia consists of two chevrons pointing up and three chevrons pointing down, with the Singapore coat of arms in the middle.

==== Home team ====
In the Singapore Prison Service, the rank of staff sergeant (SSGT) is above the rank of sergeant, and is below the rank of Chief Warder (1). The rank insignia of SSGT is one Singapore coat of arms and three pointed-down chevrons below it.

In the Singapore Police Force, the rank of staff sergeant is currently being phased out with the newly overhauled "unified police rank structure" which allows a direct-entry sergeant to be eligible for emplacement to the rank of Inspector without a degree.

In the past, the rank of staff sergeant is above the rank of sergeant, and below the rank of senior staff sergeant; with the new rank structure being introduced, the rank and insignia of staff sergeant is being phased out, and being replaced with three grades of sergeant, namely, sergeant (1), sergeant (2), and sergeant (3), before being promoted directly to senior staff sergeant. However, all three grades of sergeants don the same three-chevrons insignia.

==== Uniformed youth organisations ====
In the National Cadet Corps, staff sergeants are cadets who have passed the 3-days 2-nights Senior Specialists Leaders Course successfully. The rank of staff sergeant is above first sergeant and below master sergeant. Staff sergeants wear a rank insignia of two pointed-up chevrons, one Singapore coat of arms and three pointed-down chevrons, with the letters 'NCC' located below the insignia to differentiate NCC cadets from SAF personnel.

In the National Police Cadet Corps (NPCC) and the National Civil Defence Cadet Corps (NCDCC), the rank of staff sergeant is above sergeant, and below Station Inspector and Warrant Officer respectively. The rank of staff sergeant generally is awarded to cadets when they are in Secondary Four, before they pass out. NPCC and NCDCC staff sergeants wear a rank insignia of one Singapore coat of arms and three pointed-down chevrons. The letters 'NPCC' and 'NCDCC' are located below the insignia so as to differentiate NPCC and NCDCC cadets from Singapore Police Force and Singapore Civil Defence Force personnel respectively.

In the St John Brigade (SJB), the rank of staff sergeant (SSG) is above sergeant, and below senior staff sergeant. Staff sergeants in SJB wear a rank insignia of one St John coat of arms and three pointed-down chevrons.

=== United Kingdom ===
In the British Army, staff sergeant (SSgt or formerly S/Sgt) ranks above sergeant and below warrant officer class 2. The rank is given a NATO code of OR-7. The insignia is the monarch's crown above three downward pointing chevrons.

Staff sergeants can also hold other appointments, such as company quartermaster sergeant, and are usually known by that appointment if held. The equivalent rank in infantry regiments is colour sergeant, and holders are known by that title no matter what their appointment. In the Household Cavalry the equivalent rank is staff corporal.

British staff sergeants are never referred to or addressed as "Sergeant", which would be reducing their rank, but are referred to and addressed as "Staff Sergeant" or "Staff" ("Staff Jones", for instance) or by their appointment or its abbreviation. Quartermaster sergeants are often addressed as "Q". In most cavalry regiments, staff sergeants are addressed as "Sergeant Major", which is assumed to derive from the original rank of troop sergeant major, or as "Sir" by subordinates.

Flight sergeant and chief technician are the Royal Air Force equivalents. Chief petty officer is the equivalent in the Royal Navy and colour sergeant in the Royal Marines.

=== United States ===
Staff sergeant
- Army, Marine Corps, and Air Force
- Country: United States
- Service branch: United States Army; United States Marine Corps; United States Air Force
- Abbreviation: SSG (USA); SSgt (USMC and USAF)
- Rank group: Non-commissioned officer
- NATO rank code: OR-6 (USA & USMC); OR-5 (USAF)
- Pay grade: E-6 (USA & USMC); E-5 (USAF)
- Formation: 1920
- Next higher rank: Sergeant first class (USA); Gunnery sergeant (USMC); Technical sergeant (USAF)
- Next lower rank: Sergeant (USA & USMC); Senior airman (USAF)
- Equivalent ranks: E-6; Petty officer first class (USN & USCG); Technical sergeant (USSF); E-5; Petty officer second class (USN & USCG); Sergeant (USSF) (A USAF Staff Sergeant is an E-5 and not the equivalent of a USA or USMC SSG. In those services it is the equivalent grade of a Sergeant)

==== US Army ====
Staff sergeant (SSG) is the E-6 rank in the United States Army, just above sergeant (E-5) and below sergeant first class (E-7), and is a non-commissioned officer (NCO). Unlike the Marine Corps, US Army staff sergeants are not considered senior NCOs (senior NCOs of the Army begin with sergeant first class, equivalent to the Marines' gunnery sergeant). Staff sergeants are generally placed in charge of squads, but can also act as platoon sergeants in the absence of a sergeant first class. In support units, staff sergeants ordinarily hold headquarters positions because of the number of slots available for them in these units. Staff sergeants are typically assigned as a squad leader or company operations non-commissioned officer in charge at the company level, but may also hold other positions depending on the type of unit. Staff sergeants are referred to as "Sergeant" except in certain training environments and schools. The NATO code is OR-6.

In the early days of World War II flying sergeants with the rank of staff sergeant were qualified enlisted pilots before the rank of flight officer was introduced in September 1942.

The rank of staff sergeant in the US Army, along with technical sergeant (renamed sergeant first class in 1948) and master sergeant, was created by Congress after the First World War. In 1920 the Army combined several company/battery/troop level "staff" NCO ranks, including color sergeant, supply sergeant, radio sergeant, eleven grades of sergeant first class, three grades of sergeant, two grades of master gunner, and assistant band leader into the new rank of staff sergeant. Staff sergeant, as did the ranks it combined/replaced, then ranked above sergeant but below technical sergeant/first sergeant (which, at the time, were both in the same pay grade). At that time, sergeants served as squad or section leaders, platoon guides, and assistants to platoon commanders (the position of platoon sergeant, nor a separate rank for the position, did not yet exist), and included several formerly separate ranks such as mess sergeant, company supply sergeant, and stable sergeant, etc. In 1940, staff sergeant became the rank title of rifle platoon sergeants and in 1942 rifle squad leaders became staff sergeants, with platoon sergeants then being promoted to technical sergeants.

==== US Marine Corps ====
Staff sergeant (SSgt) is E-6 rank (NATO code OR-6) in the United States Marine Corps (USMC), ranking above sergeant and below gunnery sergeant. This grade is normally achieved after 6 years in service.

USMC Staff Sergeant Insignia 1941-1945

The rank of staff sergeant in the USMC was created in 1923 to coincide with the US Army's ranks. Until the end of World War II, the insignia of platoon sergeant was three chevrons and a rocker (worn by "line" NCO grades), with staff sergeant having a horizontal stripe or "tie" (worn by "staff" NCO grades) instead of a rocker below the chevrons. After the separate rank of platoon sergeant was eliminated, the staff sergeant rank switched over to the rocker insignia and staff sergeants held the platoon sergeant's billet.

==== US Air Force ====
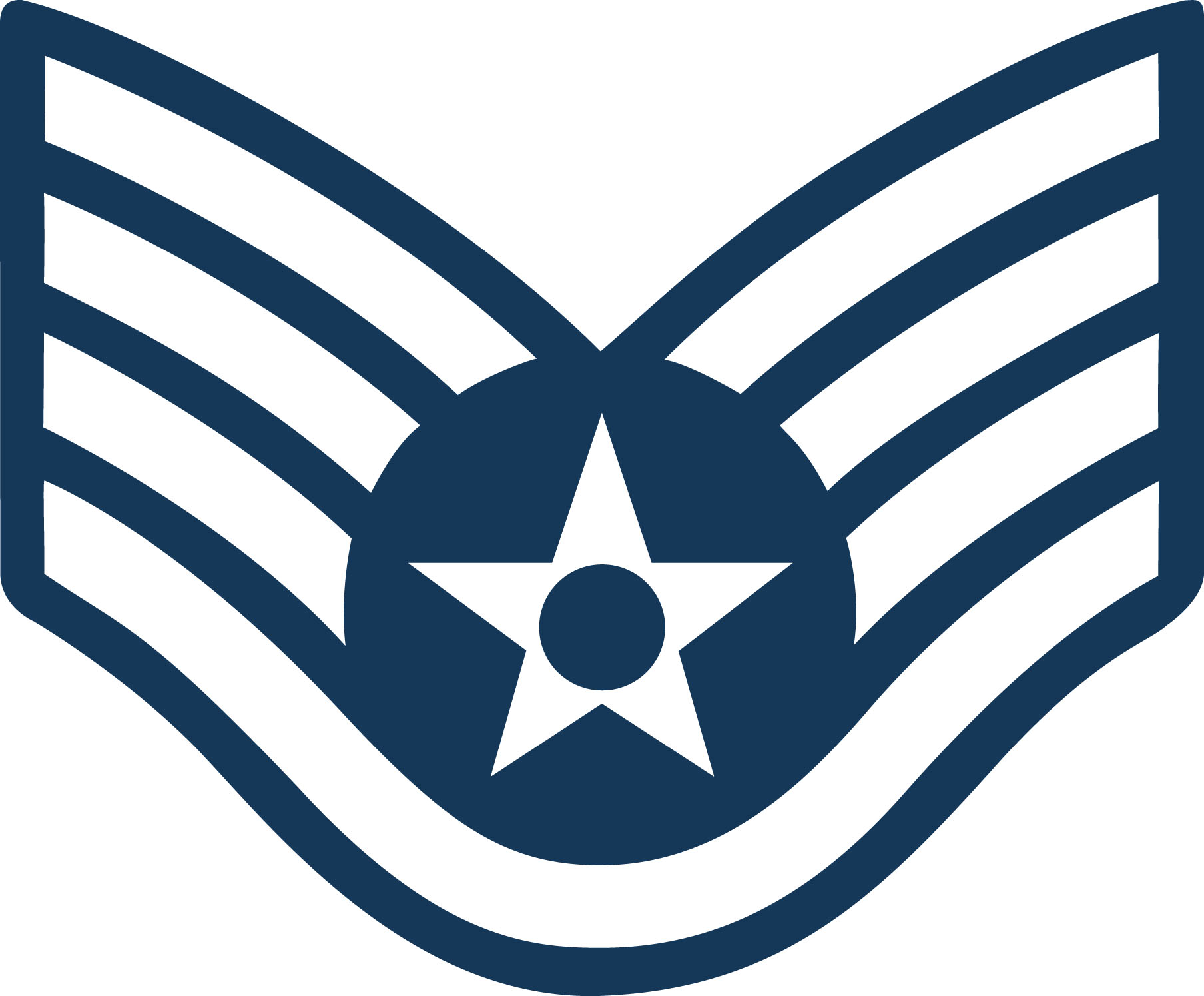
USAF Staff Sergeant

Staff Sergeant (SSgt) is an E-5 (NATO code OR-5) in the United States Air Force (USAF), ranking above Senior Airman and below Technical Sergeant. It takes a 32-48 months, completion of the Airman Leadership School and a 5-skill level to be promoted to staff sergeant. The rank of staff sergeant came over from the Army Air Forces to the Air Force's new ranks in 1948. The staff sergeant is a junior NCO and a journeyman technician with supervisory responsibility.

==== Civil Air Patrol ====
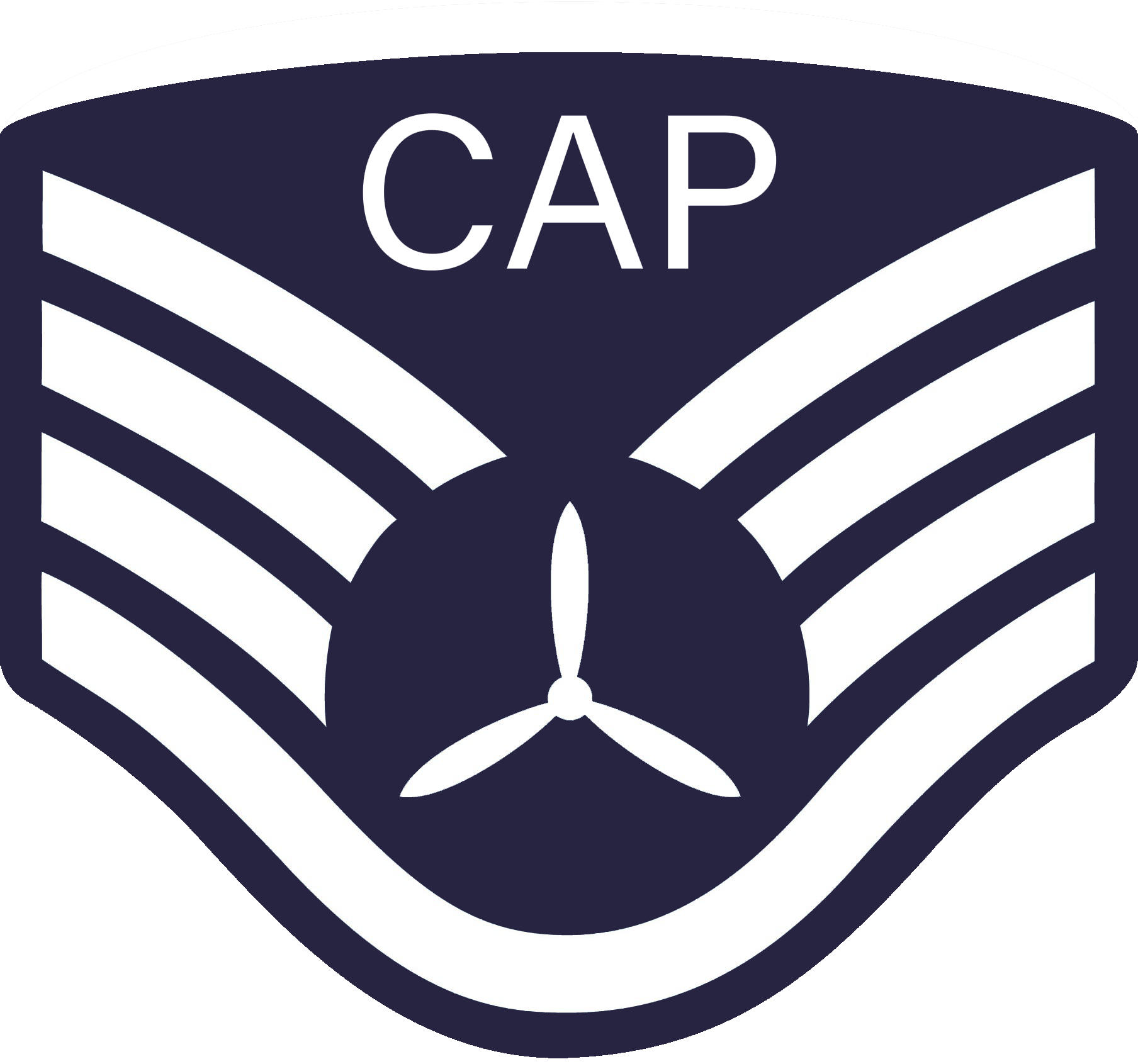
CAP Staff Sergeant

The Civil Air Patrol (CAP), a non-profit corporation Congressionally chartered to operate as the civilian auxiliary of the US Air Force, has a quasi-military structure which includes the rank of staff sergeant. The grade of staff sergeant is below technical sergeant and is the lowest NCO grade. Current or prior military service members who held a pay grade of E-4 or higher (enlisted only on Active Duty or service in the Reserves or National Guard) are eligible to serve as NCOs in Civil Air Patrol.

=== Gallery (military rank) ===
Staff sergeant
(Antigua and Barbuda Regiment)

Staff sergeant
(Barbados Regiment)

Staff sergeant
(Botswana Ground Force)

Staf sarjan
(Royal Brunei Land Force)

Staff sergeant
(Gambian National Army)

Staff sergeant
(Ghana Army)

Staff sergeant
(Guyana Army)

Staff sergeant
(Jamaican Army)

Staff sergeant
(Kenya Army)

Staff sergeant
(Lesotho Army)

Staff sergeant
(Liberian Ground Forces)

Staf sarjan
(Malaysian Army)

ސްޓާފް ސާރޖަންޓް
Staaf saarjant
(Maldives National Defence Force)

Staff sergeant
(Army of Malta)

Staff sergeant
(Namibian Army)

Staff sergeant
(New Zealand Army)

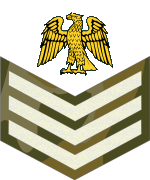
Staff sergeant
(Nigerian Army)

Stabssersjant
(Norwegian Army)

Staff sergeant
(Rwandan Land Forces)

Staff sergeant
(Seychelles Infantry Unit)

Staff sergeant
(Singapore Army)

Staff sergeant
(South African Army)

Staff sergeant
(Sri Lanka Army)

Staff sergeant
(Tongan Land Component)

Staff sergeant
(Ugandan Land Forces)

Штаб-сержант
Shtab-serzhant
(Ukrainian Ground Forces)

Staff sergeant
(British Army)

Staff sergeant
(United States Army)

Staff sergeant
(Zambian Army)

Staff sergeant
(Zimbabwe National Army)

== Other uses ==
=== Police rank ===
The rank of staff sergeant is used in some police forces to indicate a senior supervisor. The rank is used, for example, in most Canadian police services. Other national police services (for example, Cyprus) have a corresponding rank of senior sergeant. In the United Kingdom, a few police forces formerly used the rank of station sergeant, with the same rank insignia as an army staff sergeant. The Hong Kong Police Force still uses this rank.

In the Philippines, as of 8 February 2019, the rank of staff sergeant is currently being used by the national police as they adopt a new ranking classification, eliminating confusion of old ranks. The rank stands above the police corporal and below the police master sergeant.

In Australia and New Zealand, senior sergeant ("ssgt") is used instead of staff sergeant, which may shortened in an address as "Senior".

==== Gallery (police rank) ====
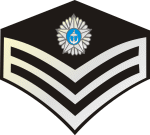
Staff sergeant
(Royal Brunei Police Force)

Staff sergeant
(Royal Canadian Mounted Police)

Police staff sergeant
(Maldives Police Service)

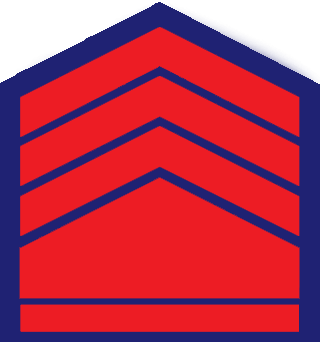
Police staff sergeant
(Philippine National Police)

Sierżant sztabowy
(Policja)

Senior staff sergeant
(Singapore Police Force)

Staff sergeant
(Singapore Police Force)

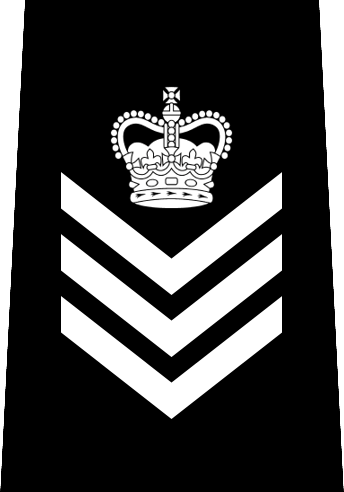
Staff sergeant
(Vancouver Police Department)

=== Cadet staff sergeant ===
The rank of cadet staff sergeant (CSSG or C/SSgt) is used by many cadet organisations around the world, including the Civil Air Patrol in the United States, and the Army Cadet Force and the Army Section of the Combined Cadet Force in the United Kingdom.

== See also ==
- Police rank
- Comparative military ranks
- Colour sergeant
- British Army other ranks rank insignia
- Former ranks of the Canadian Armed Forces
- Australian Army enlisted rank insignia
- New Zealand military ranks
- United States Army enlisted rank insignia of World War I
- United States Army enlisted rank insignia of World War II
- U.S. Air Force enlisted rank insignia
- U.S. Army enlisted rank insignia
- U.S. Marine Corps enlisted rank insignia
- U.S. Navy enlisted rate insignia
- United States military pay
