= Frank Cooper Sands =

Founder of Scouting Movement in Singapore

Frank Cooper Sands was a Scoutmaster from Nottingham, England. He is recognized as a founder of Scouting in Singapore on 2 July 1910, when Sands established two Boy Scout troops for the children of the British colonists. From there, the movement spread to other parts of the Straits Settlements and what were to become the states of Malaysia. He became the Commissioner of the Scout Association Malaya Branch which comprised the British Crown Colonies. (Within British Scout leadership hierarchy, Sands position was equivalent to a County Commissioner. All the Malay States and Straits Settlements were Districts only.) Sands spent the next 40 years helping to create Scouting in the region, and is often called the "Father of Malayan Scouting". It is only after his retirement that the posts of Chief Commissioners for Malaya and Singapore were created by the Boy Scouts Association in London for E.M.F. Payne and Canon R.K.S. Adams respectively. Presently there is an award named after him called the Frank Cooper Sands Award which is given to the best Scouts in Singapore. There are three levels of award: Bronze, Silver and Gold.

1910- Frank Cooper Sands arrived in Singapore in September 1910.

1928 - 1947 - Frank Cooper Sands was Managing Director of Malaya Publishing House Limited(MPH), incorporated on 31 December 1927. The company was carrying on its business as ‘proprietors and publishers of and dealers in newspapers, journals, magazines, books and other literary works and undertakings. Frank Sands reopened the publishing house in 1945 after the Japanese occupation, which left most of the printing equipment removed or destroyed, and the building on Stamford Road badly deteriorated.

He retired from active scouting in March 1948, after 40 years as a scout, 38 years in Malaya and 2 years in England. He is serving 23 years as Scout Commissioner for Malaya.

Awards 1935 - He was awarded Jubilee Medal in 1935, 1937- Coronation medal in 1937 1940 - He was appointed as Justice of Peace or JP 1948- awarded MBE, for public service as scout commissioner for Malaya

== See also ==
- Persekutuan Pengakap Malaysia
