= National Civil Defence Cadet Corps =

Uniformed group in Singapore

Agency overview
- Formed: 2005
- Headquarters: Home Team Academy, Singapore
- Motto: We Learn . We Lead . We Serve
- Agency executive: Lieutenant Colonel Kanagavelan Munusamy, Commandant
- Parent agency: Ministry of Home Affairs; Ministry of Education
- Website: https://www.scdf.gov.sg/ncdcc

The National Civil Defence Cadet Corps (NCDCC) is a youth national uniformed group formed in 2005. The creation of this uniformed group was initiated by the Ministry of Home Affairs, Singapore in response to the need for the young leaders of tomorrow to have a firm pillar and grounding in Singapore's firm belief of Total Defence.

Along with the National Police Cadet Corps (NPCC), the corps has its Headquarters at the Home Team Academy. While NDCC adopts civil defence-style training and structure, it holds no actual civil authority and primarily serves as an educational and character-building experience through structured simulations and drills.

== History ==
In 2004, the NCDCC was announced to be the ninth uniformed group (UG) co-curricular activity in Singapore and to be started in selected secondary schools in the first half of 2005. With the NCDCC, the Ministry of Education planned to have one in three students involved in a uniformed group in every school within five years.

NCDCC was introduced in 12 secondary schools starting from January 2005. For the pilot phase, 38 cadets completed the very first NCO Course while 22 teachers were commissioned as the pioneer batch of NCDCC officers after completing the first Officer Basic Course. On 23 December 2005, 22 cadets attended the conversion course and became the pioneer batch of Cadet Lieutenants or CLTs for short.

Civil Defence is one of the current six pillars of Total Defence; it refers to the protection of the Singapore people by the Singapore Civil Defence Force (SCDF). NCDCC is a component of the Home Team Cadet Corps Initiative.

== NCDCC Specialisation Model ==
Launched on 8 April 2017 during the 12th NCDCC Day Parade, the NCDCC Specialisation Model aims to provide all Secondary Three NCDCC cadets the option to specialise in either Fire Safety, Medical Response or Urban Search and Rescue Specialisation Courses based on their strengths and interests. These courses are co-developed with and conducted by the respective field specialists, modelling after the key functional areas of the Singapore Civil Defence Force (SCDF). Cadets are exposed to authentic learning experiences through realistic simulation and case studies to enable them to take on the role of Community First Responders, in line with the SGSecure Movement to assist themselves and those around them in times of emergency. Cadets are also trained in skills to be a more effective communicator and leader in their units.

NCDCC's Specialisation Model is the top 2 nominations recognised as a Best Practice, under the Organisation Development category, for the inaugural MOE HQ Best Practice Awards 2017 which aims to recognize HQ Divisions that have implemented best-in-class practices which are aligned to MOE's mission, vision and values. The MOE HQ BPA Award is aligned to the Public Service Transformation (PST) Awards 2018 – Best Practice Award Category.

The Specialisation Model also succeeds the similar Senior Non-Commissioned Officer Course (SNCO) that have been conducted previously since the formation of the Corps.

=== Fire Safety Specialisation ===
The Fire Safety Specialisation Course empowers cadets with the skills and knowledge of general fire safety standards and provisions. Cadets go through a series of practical activities and learning journeys to have a first-hand experience in the operations of fire protection devices, fire drill, and enforcement checks.

In addition, cadets are also introduced to the concept of Fire Investigation to learn from realistic simulations and cases simulating the damaging effects of fire. At the end of the course, cadets can assist their school unit and community as fire safety ambassadors.

The trainers of the course, the SCDF Fire & Rescue Specialists, will also share their real-life experiences through cases they have attended to in the course of their duties.

Upon successful completion of the course, cadets are awarded an iron-on tab with the words 'FIRE SAFETY' printed on it that can be worn on the left side of their No.4 uniform under the rank, signifying them as cadets having passed out with the required knowledge and expertise in the Fire Safety Specialisation Course.

=== Medical Response Specialisation ===
The Medical Response Specialisation Course equips cadets with case studies of common emergencies and in-depth approach to perform critical emergency interventions. The course also imparts theoretical knowledge and practical skills for the resuscitation of collapsed adult and infant victims and the use of Automated External Defibrillator (AED) to restore normal heart rhythms.

The SCDF paramedics and NCDCC personnel who have responded to real-life emergencies will be invited to share their real-life experiences in applying the triangle of life to save someone's life.

Upon successful completion of the course, cadets will receive a Provider Certificate in Standard First Aid, Basic Cardiac Life Support (BCLS) and AED, which are accredited by the Singapore Resuscitation & First Aid Council. Additionally, cadets are awarded an iron-on tab with the words 'MEDICAL RESPONSE' printed on it that can be worn on the left side of their No.4 uniform under the rank, signifying them as cadets having passed out with the required knowledge and expertise in the Medical Response Specialisation Course.

=== Urban Search and Rescue Specialisation ===
The Urban Search and Rescue (USAR) Specialisation Course involves the searching of victims, accessing into voids, providing medical stabilisation and the extrication of victims trapped under structural collapse. SCDF's USAR capability is internationally accredited by the United Nations Disaster Assistance Council. Under the codename 'Ops Lionheart Contingent', SCDF's elite Disaster Assistance and Rescue Team (DART) travel to different parts of Asia Pacific to render USAR assistance to countries affected by disaster.

The participants of the NCDCC USAR Specialisation Course will be introduced to the overview of USAR operations, basic search and rescue skills, hazard identification and psychological first aid. Participants will be taught how to recognise risks associated with collapsed structures and go through simulation exercises to render help and evacuate surface-trapped victims away from risk areas using simple rescue tools from well-known rescue tool companies such as LUKAS.

The NCDCC USAR Specialisation Course is supported by the United Nations International Search and Rescue Advisory Group (INSARAG). This is the first course involving secondary school students to be given the prestigious recognition.

Upon successful completion of the course, cadets will be awarded an iron-on tab with the words 'URBAN SEARCH AND RESCUE' printed on it that can be worn on the left side of their No.4 uniform under the rank, signifying them as cadets having passed out with the required knowledge and expertise in the Urban Search and Rescue Course.

== Rank structure ==
Rank structures are implemented in all Uniform Groups with the common ambition of motivating the cadets and encouraging them to be on a constant roll and quest to try out new things.

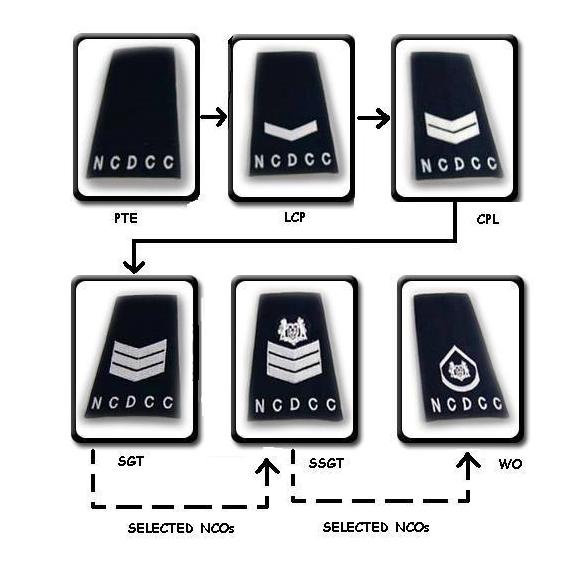

Cadets

All cadets will start off holding the rank of private, after which will be promoted subsequently, however, promotion is based on the number of badges earned and completion of courses. The ranks are as follows:

- Private (PTE)
- Lance Corporal (LCP)
- Corporal (CPL)
- Sergeant (SGT)
- Staff Sergeant (SSG)
- Warrant Officer (WO)

Cadet Officers

Cadet officers are cadets who have graduated from their secondary school, are studying in a post-secondary institution and have passed out from the Cadet Lieutenant Course. The ranks are as follows:

- Cadet Lieutenant (CLT)
- Senior Cadet Lieutenant (S/CLT)

Officers

Officers in NCDCC are teachers assigned from their respective schools to aid in the unit. They can also be Honorary Instructors or Honorary Officers directly assigned by HQ NCDCC. The ranks are as follows:

- Lieutenant (LTA)
- Captain (CPT)
- Major (MAJ)

As part of the rank, the letters NCDCC are embroidered which forms part of the Corps Insignia.

== Membership ==
Newly enrolled Secondary One students from schools with an NCDCC unit set up can choose to become members of the corps. Units also need to submit a nominal roll to the headquarters at the Home Team Academy for monitoring purposes. While there are no restrictions regarding membership for Singapore Citizens and permanent residents, foreign students' membership will have to be approved by the relevant ministry. Members are expected to be part of the corps throughout the four or five years of their secondary school education. However, members may be discharged from the corps based on valid reasons.

== Controversies ==
In 2025, a 33-year-old married Singapore Civil Defence Force (SCDF) officer serving as a NCDCC instructor was sentenced to two and a half years' imprisonment for engaging in an inappropriate sexual relationship with a 15-year-old student.

== See also ==
- Cadets (youth program)
- Ministry of Home Affairs (Singapore)
- Singapore Civil Defence Force
- Education in Singapore
- National Cadet Corps (Singapore)
- National Police Cadet Corps
