= Infocomm Clubs Programme =

Logo of Infocomm Clubs in Singapore

The Infocomm Clubs Programme is a Co-Curricular Activity (CCA) for primary schools, secondary schools and junior college students in Singapore, set up in 2006 by the Infocomm Development Authority of Singapore.

== See also ==
- Intelligent Nation 2015
