= Eileen Aw =

Singaporean medical practitioner

Eileen Aw (née Fam; born 1938 or 1939) is a Singaporean medical practitioner and Girl Guide leader. She served as the Chief Commissioner of the Singapore Girl Guides Association from 1977 to 1984, the first director of the Social Development Unit from 1984 to 1990 and the Executive and medical director of the St Luke's Hospital from its founding in 1996 to 1999.

== Early life and education ==
Aw was born in Singapore in the late 1930s and studied at the Methodist Girls' School. She first became a Girl Guide in 1949, joining the 11th Singapore Guide Coy (Open Unit). She received the Queen's Guide award in 1954 at the age of 16, becoming the third Singaporean to receive the award. She had volunteered at a children's hospital in Australia for over three years, as well as with the Singapore Children's Social Welfare Centre. She became a ranger soon after. In 1957, she was one of two Guides selected to meet Queen Elizabeth II. Aw received her Bachelor of Medicine, Bachelor of Surgery from the National University of Singapore in 1963.

== Career ==
Aw joined the Ministry of Health in 1968. She became a physician at the University Health Centre of the National University of Singapore. From 1969 to 1972, she edited Guide News. Aw was made a non-resident fellow of the university in 1969 and represented the institution at the fourth World University Service Asian Health Conference, held in Hong Kong in July 1971. In January 1972, it was announced that Aw would be replacing Nalla Tan as the principal of the university's Eusoff College while continuing to work with the university's health services. The following year, she became the founding secretary of the Trefoil Guild, an association for former members Girl Guides who were unable to continue such work. She later served as its president. In July 1977, Aw was appointed Chief Commissioner of the Singapore Girl Guides Association, a role which she held until 1984. In 1978, she was a part of the four-member delegation representing the Singapore Girl Guides Association at the 23rd World Conference of the World Association of Girl Guides and Girl Scouts, held in Tehran, Iran. In the same year, she was replaced by Lim Kit Boey as principal of the Eusoff College.

In 1984, Aw was appointed the director of the newly established Social Development Unit. She was offered the position by then-permanent secretary for the Finance Ministry Andrew Chew, who gave her two days to decide if she would take the offer. The department was initially a "matchmaking body" aiming to aid "unmarried graduate women." Under her, it expanded to cater towards other groups, such as divorcees. As director, Aw reportedly oversaw 1,000 marriages amongst its members. She also served as the editor of Link, the body's quarterly magazine, which was established in 1987. In the same year, she was promoted to Superscale E. She left the department in 1990 to serve as the head of the health service of the National University of Singapore from 2 July onwards, after which she was replaced by Ang Wai Hoong. Aw received the Public Administration Medal (Gold) at the 1987 National Day awards for her "commitment, indomitable spirit and sincerity", which "made Singaporeans more aware of the problem of single graduate women" and "changed attitudes of single graduates towards marriage."

In 1995, it was announced that Aw was to serve as the director of the St Luke's Hospital, a geriatric hospital which was to open the following year. To prepare for the shift from adolescent to geriatric medicine, she decided to undergo training in Wales for a month and to work with the Tan Tock Seng Hospital and Alexandra Hospital. In 1999, she left the position to establish St. Luke's Eldercare, a sister organisation. Aw was appointed a Justice of the Peace on 8 May 2013. As of 2021, she was a Deputy Registrar of Marriages and the chair of the Board of the Singapore Mission School in Laos, located in Vientiane.

== Personal life ==
Aw married Dr. Aw Swee Eng, with whom she had two children. They met while they were both medical students.
