= Cub Scouts (Singapore Scout Association) =

The Cub Scouts are part of the Singapore Scout Association (SSA). They were formerly known as "Wolf Cubs" in the pre-1966 era when Singapore Scouting was still under the jurisdiction of the Scout Association, UK (then known as the Imperial Headquarters).

== History ==
The first Wolf Cub Pack in Singapore was started in Outram Road School in 1925 with a single Wolf Cub Patrol led by H.F. Duncanson of the 9th Singapore Troop. When the Japanese Scout Troop was formed later that year, a Wolf Cub Section was included in their infrastructure.

In 1927, the 3rd Singapore Troop, an offshoot of the 4th Singapore (SJI) Troop, was dissolved and converted into a full-fledged Wolf Cub Pack within the 4th Troop's Structure. The 3rd Troop's name was subsequently assigned to the Oldham Hall Troop formed in 1928.

The Wolf Cub Section however began some time back, on 1 Jan 1914 at St Stephen's Westminster in Great Britain. Over the years, Wolf Cub Packs had begun to sprout up across the British Empire and by 1935, there were over 15,000 Packs with 275,000 Wolf Cubs and 22,000 Cubmasters. In November 1935, 10 years after the Wolf Cub Section was started in Singapore, 150 Wolf Cubs and 25 Officers made the Grand Wolf Cub's Rally and Campfire on the old race course in Singapore in a splendid celebration of the twenty-first anniversary of the Wolf Cub Section in the world. By that time, there were 13 Wolf Cub Packs in Singapore.

The Wolf Cub's Rally was led by Singapore District Scoutmaster Crickett and was lent a special note by the attendance of Fleet Scoutmaster Lawder, the Scout Commissioner for Malaya, Mr Frank Cooper Sands, the Assistant Commissioner for Malaya, Mr H.R. Cheeseman, the Chief Commissioner for Singapore Mr Cullen and the Assistant Chief Commissioner for Singapore, Rev. R. K. S. Adams.

The term "Cadet Scouts" was adopted when the first "Policy, Organisation and Rules" of (SSA) was promulgated in 1969, after following the changes introduced by the "1966 Advance Party Report (APR)" of the UK Scout Association. The name was changed again to "Cub Scouts" in 2005 to better reflect international usage.

The UK term "Cub Scouts" as proposed in the APR was however not adopted in 1969 although the entire progress badge scheme and proficiency badge scheme were embraced with minor amendments to the names. Progress badges were called the "Standards" instead of "Arrows", i.e. the Bronze Standard, Silver Standard and Gold Standard. The "link badge" was known as the "District Commissioner's Award", serving as the highest award for the Cadet Scout category. After 2000, the term "Standards" were again revised to "Arrows" and "Cub Scout" name has replaced that of "Cadet Scout". In 2005, the Singapore Scout Association has updated the Cub Scout Training Scheme, revising the syllabus and giving a new look to the designs of the progress badges. While the "Arrows" are retained, the top progress award is now known as the Akela Award (a wolf's head on a green background), replacing the "link badge" design of the UK.

Cub Scouts in Singapore follow a common Scout Promise and Law unlike the Wolf Cub era when they have a separate set of Cub Promise and Law. Cub Scouts are grouped in "Sixes" distinguished by coloured Turk's head woggles, where they are led by a "Sixer" and an "Assistant Sixer". If the situation calls for it, a "Senior Sixer" would also be appointed. The Cub Scout Leader leads the Cub Scout Unit (or "Pack") with the help of Assistant Cub Scout Leaders and the "Sixers' Council" composed of all the Sixers. At the Headquarters, National Cub Scout Commissioner presides over the Cub Scout Roundtable which oversee training and policy matters related to Cub Scouting.

The uniform of Cub Scouts in Singapore consists of a luminous-green jersey shirt, dark-green shorts, regulation national scarf/group scarf, Six woggle, regulation leather belt, olive-green socks, black shoes and the headdress. Notably, the headdress is the cap version (green with yellow-pipings) used since the inception of Wolf Cubs in the early 1910s. Prior to 1990, the uniform of Singapore's Cadet Scouts is khaki in colour, which was adopted in 1964.

The latest change to this section of Singapore Scouting was unveiled during the National Youth Programme Symposium held in July 2005 by the Singapore Scout Association, where the new name, "Cub Scout", was adopted together with the changes in the training scheme. Since that year minor amendments have been made to the way the top award was assessed.

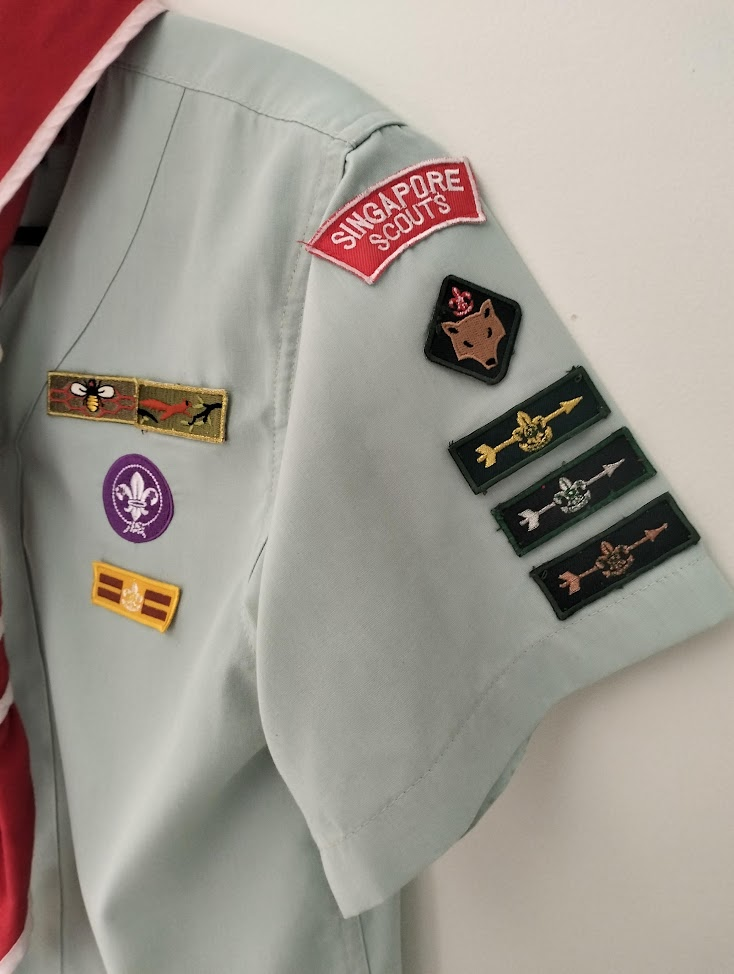
Progress badges for cub scouts on left sleeve showing the 3 arrows and the defunct Akela Award. The Bumble Bee and Squirrel badges and Sixer badge are on the left chest.

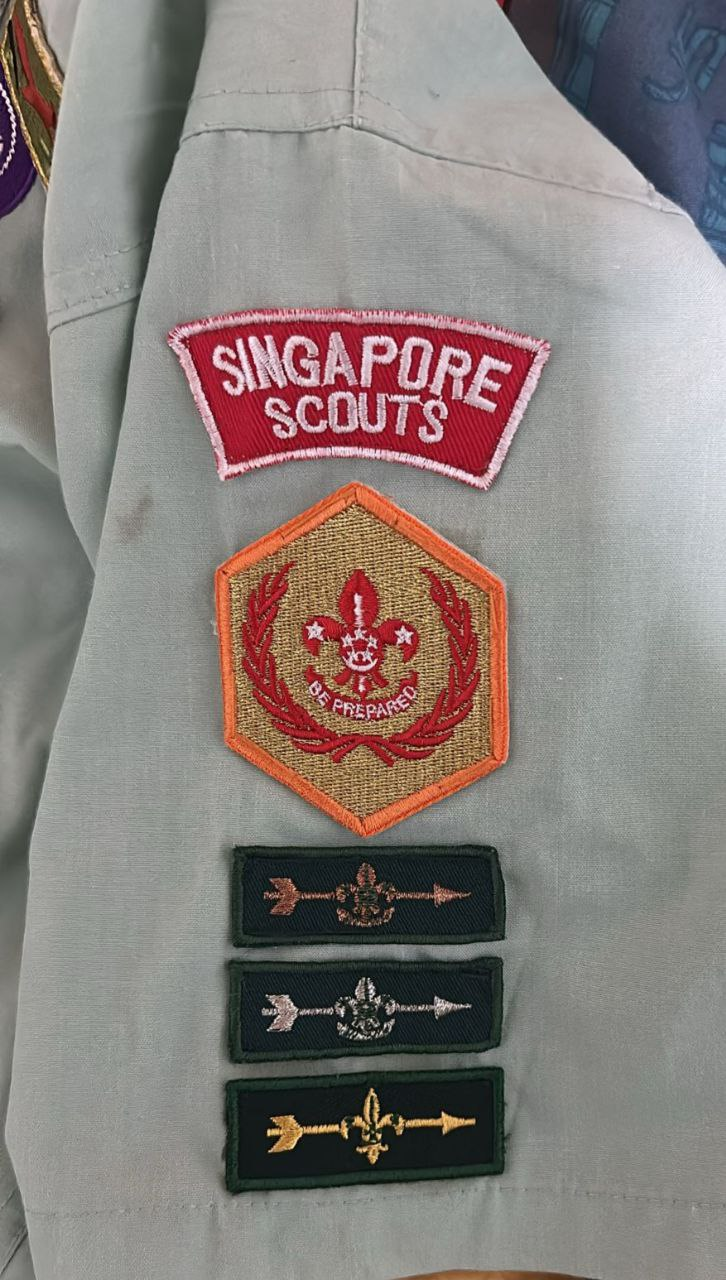
Progress badges for cub scouts on left sleeve showing the 3 arrows and the new Chief Scout's Award (for cub scouts).

== Badges ==
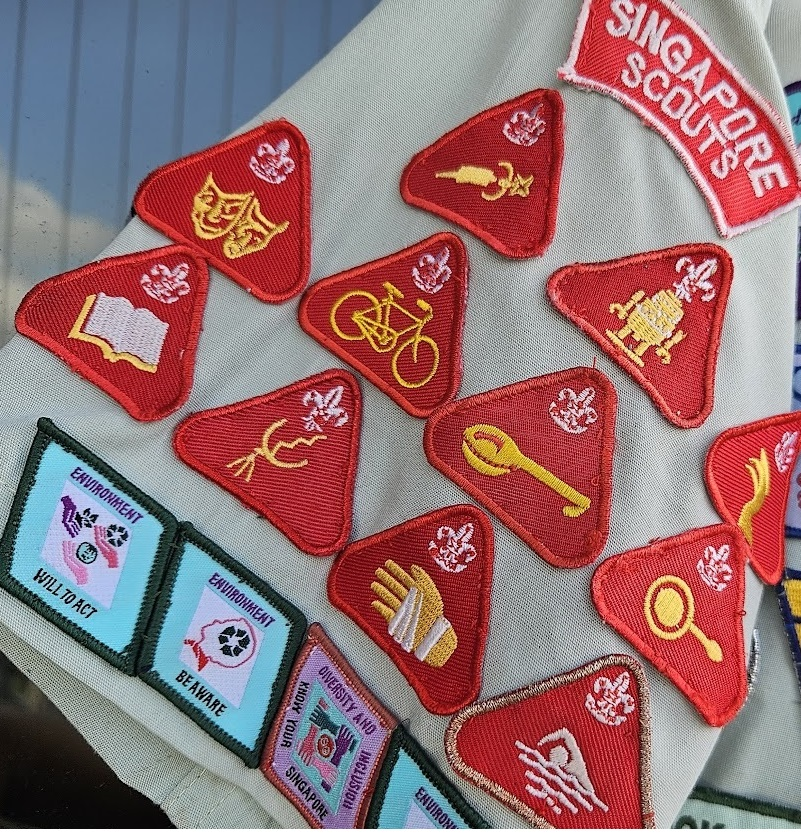
Red triangular activity badges for cub scouts on right sleeve. The diamond-shaped badges are Diamond Jubilee Challenge (2022-2025) badges

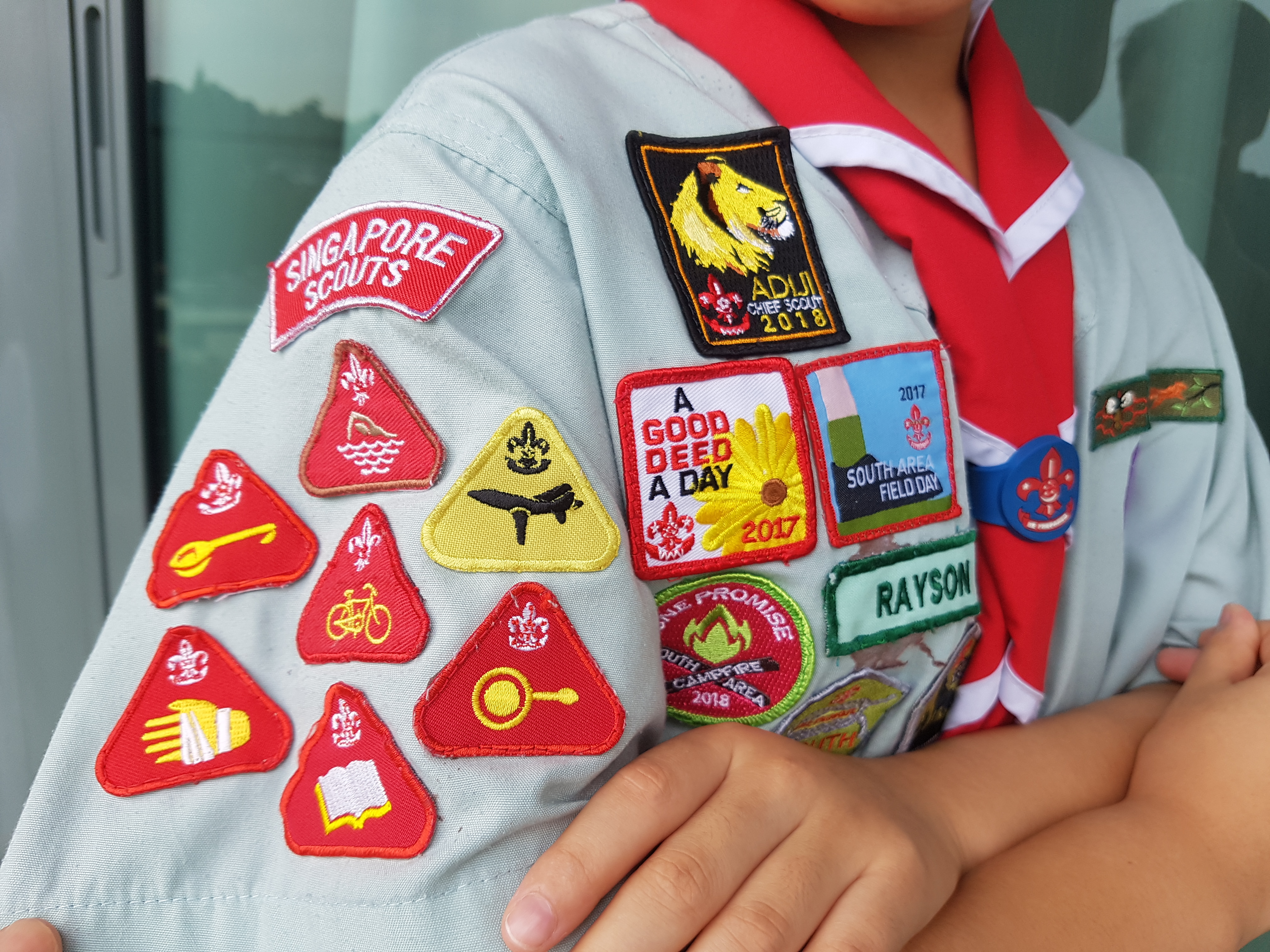
Showing activity badges on right sleeve and event badges on right chest above name tag

There are 2 main categories of badges: progress badges and pursuit badges. Progress badges (bronze, silver, golden arrow and the new Chief Scout's Award) are sewn on the left sleeve. Only the highest progress badge should be on the uniform. Pursuit badges can be further subdivided into (i) activity badges, (ii) proficiency badges and (iii) national campaign badges.

=== Activity, Proficiency and National Campaign Badges ===
Activity badges and proficiency badges are sewn on the right sleeve, while national campaign badges can be sewn on either sleeve where there is space. Activity badges are red and triangular. There are a total of 48 activity badges currently, and they include Swimmer, Cyclist, Camper, Archer, Bird Watcher, Book Reader, Cook, Animal Lover, Artist etc. The proficiency badges are newly introduced in 2025, and are circular badges with a blue/purple theme. Currently there are 5 proficiency badges including Cybersecurity, Digital Citizen, Emergency Preparedness, Young Aviator and Young Mariner.

=== Rank and Other Badges ===
The Bumble Bee and Squirrel badges are awarded for participating in Scout Job Week and Donation Draw Ticket Fundraising respectively. There are 4 levels for each of these badges (Green, Bronze, Silver and Gold), of which only the highest attained should be worn. These two rectangular badges are placed on top of the World Scout badge on the left chest, with the Bumble Bee badge nearer to the heart. Members of a unit which has won the Frank Cooper Sands Award can wear the Frank Cooper Sands Award Badge above the Bumble Bee/Squirrel badges. Rank badges (Assistant Sixer, Sixer, Senior Sixer) badges are below the World Scout Badge on the left chest. Event badges are awarded after attending an event (such as a leadership camp, the National Jamboree or inter-unit competition). Event badges are positioned above the name tag at the right chest. From 2022 to 2025, special Diamond Jubilee Challenge (2022-2025) badges are issued to commemorate 60 years of Singapore's nationhood. Cub scouts can earn one diamond badge every quarter.

== Section Leadership ==
The section is overseen by the Cub Scout Executive Committee (CubSEC) which is led by the National Cub Scout Commissioner.
The team is made up largely of teachers who are also experienced Cub Scout Leaders from various schools.

== SSA Promises ==
=== The Scout Promise ===
On my Honour I promise that I will do my best-
To do my duty to God and to the Republic of Singapore
To help other people and
To keep the Scout Law.

=== The Scout Law ===
A Scout is to be trusted.
A Scout is loyal.
A Scout makes friends, establishes and maintains harmonious relations.
A Scout is disciplined and considerate.
A Scout has courage in all difficulties.

=== Mission statement ===
"Our movement develops youth for purposeful and responsible adulthood, always prepared to serve God, country and humanity."

=== Scout Motto ===
Be Prepared

== See also ==
- Singapore Scout Association
- Girl Guides Singapore
