= Corporal of the field =

Military rank

Corporal of the field is a former military rank.

The rank is mentioned in William Shakespeare's Love's Labour's Lost and Ben Jonson's The New Inn. The rank was formerly of an officer in one source equivalent to a "captain of horse" or a brigade major or aide-de-camp

A corporal of the field served as an aide to a staff officer or sergeant major.
