= Singapore Scout Association =

Youth movement established in 1910

- Headquarters: 1 Bishan Street 12, Singapore 579808
- Location: Bishan, Singapore
- Country: Singapore
- Coordinates: 1°20′51.5″N 103°51′00.5″E
- Founded: 1965; 61 years ago
- Founder: The Boy Scouts Association of the United Kingdom
- Membership: 12,365
- Chief Scout: Tharman Shanmugaratnam
- President: Raymond Chia Lee Meng
- Chief Commissioner: Desmond Chong Kok Hwee
- Affiliation: World Organization of the Scout Movement
- Website www.scout.sg

The Singapore Scout Association (SSA) is a Scout organisation in Singapore. It was formed in 1965 but had origins in 1910.

As an organization within a multilingual country, the Association is called in Malay: Persatuan Pengakap Singapura-PPS, simplified Chinese: 新加坡童军总会; traditional Chinese: 新加坡童軍總會; pinyin: Xīnjiāpō Tóngjūn Zǒnghuì.

== History ==
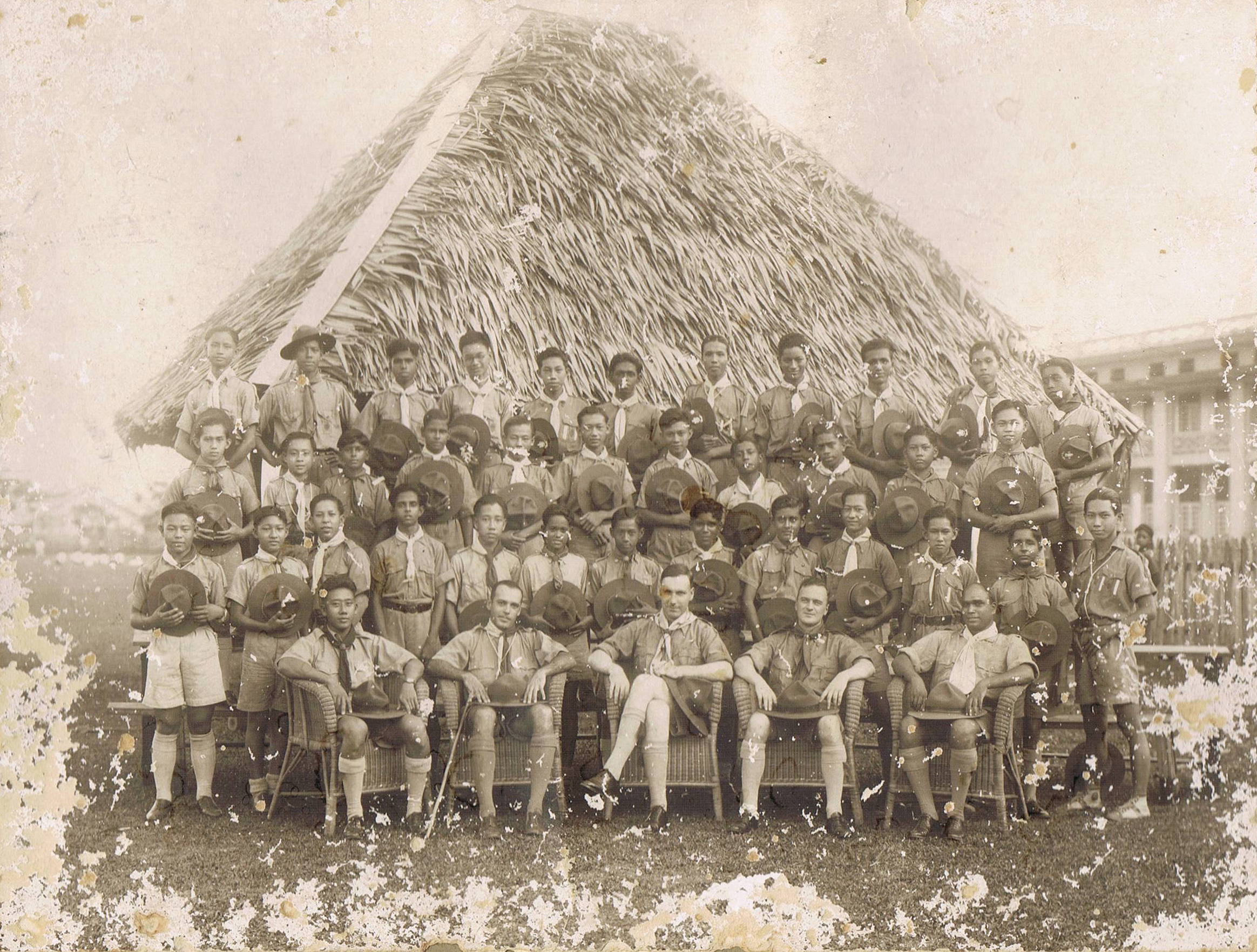
Troop photo, circa 1937

Scouting was first introduced in Singapore in 1908 but was officially founded on 2 July 1910.

Frank Cooper Sands who had been a Scoutmaster in Nottingham, England, arrived in Singapore in September 1910 and formed a troop of 30 British boys that registered with The Boy Scouts Association in the United Kingdom on 2 July 1910. He spent the next 40 years promoting The Boy Scouts Association's Singapore branch.

Scouting for local Singapore boys was started in 1919, by Captain N.M. Hashim and A.Z. Alsagoff. From 1922, some schools in Singapore began adopted the Scout programme as an extracurricular activity resulting in the formation of school-sponsored troops registered as 2nd Raffles Institution, 3rd Anglo-Chinese School and 4th St Joseph Institution. Although the 04 St Joseph's Pelandok Scout Group was formed in 1911, 2nd Raffles Institution, subsequently renamed 02 Raffles Scout Group, is currently the oldest continuous-functioning scout troop after the 1st Sand's Troop disbanded.

From 1963 to 1965, the SSA formed part of the Scout Association of Malaysia. In 1965, SSA was formed as the Singapore Boy Scouts Association and succeeded The Boy Scouts Association's Singapore branch. The Singapore Boy Scouts Association changed its name to the Singapore Scout Association.

== Present-day ==
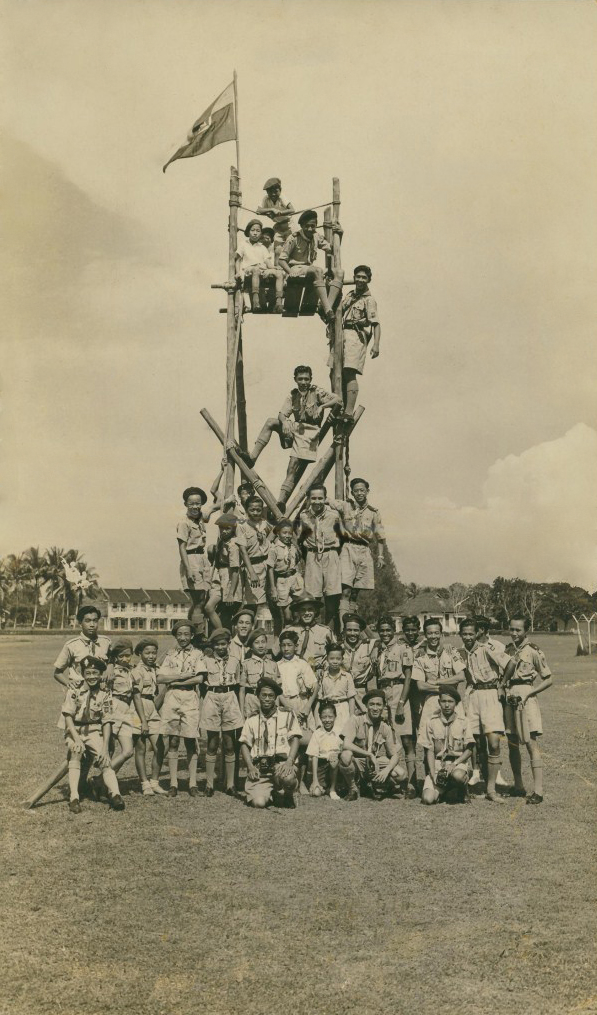
Arrow Scout Group at Youth Rally, circa 1949

Today, there are 12,438 Singapore Scouts in the country serving in four mainstream Scout sections. Each section caters to the needs of Scouts in a specific age range through different program focuses. The Cub Scout section comprises youths between ages 7 and 12 (primary school) while the Scout section is made up of youths between ages 12 and 16 (secondary school age). In addition, there are the Venture Scout and Rover Scout sections which accept youths between the ages of 15 and 18 and young adults from 17 to 25 respectively.

Besides the mainstream Scout sections, there is also the Sea Scout section, which comprises Sea Scouts, Sea Venture Scouts and Sea Rover Scouts, and the Extension Scouts which is open to all physically or mentally disadvantaged youths who enjoy Scouting.

An Air Scout section was previously abolished, but it was revived in 2011 under the name Black Knights Air Scouts. On 24 March 2012, an investiture ceremony was held to officially welcome the latest batch of Air Scout Rovers. Some 20 students and two lecturers from ITE College Central's Black Knights Air Scouts, completed the airborne training conducted by the Royal Thai Air Force (RTAF) from 5 to 8 July 2012, during their Overseas Training Program 2012, in Bangkok, Thailand.

In 2025, the Association underwent a series of internal structural changes, aimed at improving the Scouting experience across all levels while significantly reducing administrative burdens on its Scout Leaders.

== The Scout Law and Promise ==
The Scout Law: A scout is to be trusted. A scout is loyal. A scout makes friends, establishes and maintains harmonious relations. A scout is disciplined and considerate. A scout has courage in all difficulties.

The Scout Promise: On my honour, I promise to do my best, to do my duty to God, and to the Republic of Singapore. To help other people, and to keep the Scout Law.

The Scout Motto: Be Prepared

== Emblem ==
The SSA emblem uses the red and white from the Flag of Singapore, plus the 5 stars and crescent symbolizing unity of Scouts regardless of ethnic origin, religion or mother tongue.

== Structure ==
The President of the Republic of Singapore is the SSA Chief Scout. The SSA's Chief Scout is its highest official and grants warrants and awards to uniformed adult leaders and commissioners who are recommended by the association headquarters. The Chief Scout also awards deserving and outstanding Venture and Rover Scouts who have attained the standards of SSA's highest award — the President's Scout Award (Venture) and President's Scout Award (Rover) respectively. Previously, the highest award of achievement for Rover Scouts was the Baden Powell Award, but it has now been reserved only for the most outstanding and inspiring scouts; subject to recommendation by the Scout Council.

The SSA's members form its Scout Council, which comprises the uniformed and lay officials who assist the SSA's Chief Scout in his functions. The Scout council is responsible for finding funds to support the association's activities and providing strategic direction and financial oversight on the association, while the commissioners' council formulates operational policies and directives in the respective fields and departments. The area council and the districts implement the various SSA policies and directives to the grassroot units. Employed full-time staff provide day-to-day management of the association headquarters and provide support services to commissioners' council and Scout council.

The Scout council elects SSA's president, together with its vice presidents and successive council members. Several committees are formed to look into various aspects of the association including the finance committee, uniform committee, and Scout Shop committee.

The commissioner's council is the highest operational policy and directive body headed by the chief commissioner. The commissioner's council structure is as follows:

- chief commissioner
- deputy chief commissioners
- assistant chief commissioners
  - national training commissioner
  - national programme commissioner
  - area commissioners
  - membership growth commissioner
  - partnership commissioner
  - adult resource commissioner
  - Programme Resource Commissioner
- international/relations commissioner
- district commissioner

The national training commissioner is the head of national training team whose role is to provide adult leader training towards Woodbadge. The national programme commissioner is the head of national programme council whose role is to provide Scout programmes and updates for all youth members. The international/relations commissioner is the head of international/relations department that handles both relations within Singapore and internationally.

== Scout Uniform ==
The Scout uniform contains a woggle, scarf, belt, epaulettes, name tag, badges, hat/beret, socks and shoes. SSA also operates Cubs for those too young to be Scouts and make the Scout promise. Cubs wear a similar uniform without epaulettes.

== Bid for 23rd World Scout Jamboree in 2015 ==
The SSA made a failed bid to host the 23rd World Scout Jamboree at its campsite on Coney Island, Singapore, in 2015. In 2008, the World Organization of the Scout Movement instead awarded to the Jamboree to the Scout Association of Japan.

== See also ==
- Girl Guides Singapore
- Cub Scouts (Singapore Scout Association)
- World Buddhist Scout Brotherhood
