= Girl Guides Singapore =

National guiding society of Singapore

- Former name: The Singapore Girl Guides Association
- Headquarters: 9 Bishan St 14, Singapore 579785
- Location: Bishan, Singapore
- Coordinates: 1°21′12.9″N 103°51′02.8″E
- Founded: 1917; 109 years ago
- Membership: 12,340
- President: Dr Seetha Subbiah
- Affiliation: World Association of Girl Guides and Girl Scouts
- Website girlguides.org.sg

Girl Guides Singapore (GGS; Malay: Pandu Puteri Singapura) is the national Guiding organisation of Singapore. It was first established in 1917 as The Singapore Girl Guides Association, before being renamed to its current iteration on 24 July 2004. The girls-only organisation became a full member of the World Association of Girl Guides and Girl Scouts in 1966 and serves 12,340 members.

== Program and ideals ==
The association is divided in three sections according to age:

- Brownies - ages 7 to 12
- Guides - ages 12 to 16/17
- Young Adults - ages 17 to 25

The Girl Guide emblem incorporates the letters P P, for Pandu Puteri Singapura, Girl Guides Singapore in Malay, the National Language of Singapore.

=== Brownie Promise ===
I promise to do my best,
To do my duty to God,
to serve my country
and help other people,
and to keep the Brownie Law.

=== Guides Promise ===
I promise to do my best,
To do my duty to God,
To serve my country and
help other people, and
To keep the Guide Law.

=== Young Adult Promise ===
I promise to do my best,
To do my duty to God,
To serve my country and
help other people, and
To keep the Guide Law.
And to take my Promise into the wider world.

=== Guide Law ===
1. A Guide is loyal and can be trusted.
2. A Guide is useful and helps others.
3. A Guide is polite, considerate and respects her elders.
4. A Guide is friendly and a sister to all Guides.
5. A Guide is kind to all living things.
6. A Guide is obedient.
7. A Guide has courage and is cheerful in all difficulties.
8. A Guide takes care of her own possessions and those of other people.
9. A Guide is thrifty and diligent.
10. A Guide is self-disciplined in what she thinks, says and does.

=== Brownie Motto ===
'Lend A Hand.'

=== Guide Motto ===
'Be Prepared.'

=== Young Adult Leader Motto ===
'To Serve.'

== Notable people ==
- Eileen Aw (born 1938 or 1939), Singaporean medical practitioner and Girl Guide leader.

== See also ==
- The Singapore Scout Association
