= National Police Cadet Corps =

Uniformed group in Singapore

Coordinates: 1°22′25.58″N 103°43′21.58″E

- Logo of the National Police Cadet Corps

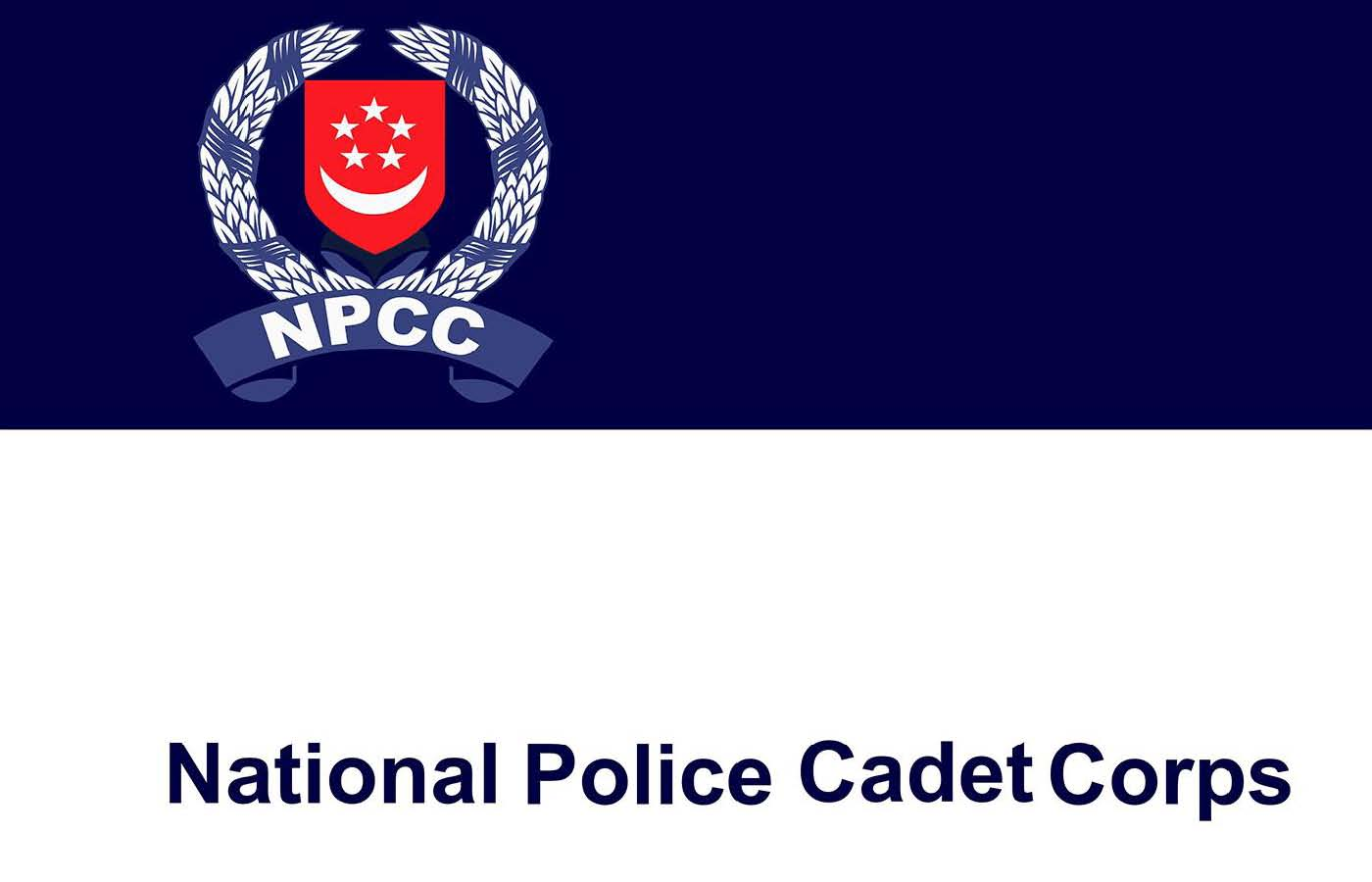
- Flag of the National Police Cadet Corps
- Abbreviation: NPCC

Agency overview
- Formed: 8 May 1959
- Preceding agencies: Police Cadet Corps (8 May 1959 – 31 December 1968); National Cadet Corps (Police) (1 January 1969 – 19 July 1971)
- Volunteers: ~10,000 (2021)

Jurisdictional structure
- Operations jurisdiction: Singapore
- Constituting instruments: Home Team Corps Act 2017; Home Team Corps Regulations 2018; Home Team Corps (Service Medal) Regulations 2018; Home Team Corps (Long Service Medal) Regulations 2018

Operational structure
- Overseen by: Home Team Corps Council
- Headquarters: Home Team Academy
- Agency executives: Anwar Abdullah, Chairman, Home Team Corps Council; SUPT Lim Bee Leng, Commandant, National Police Cadet Corps
- Parent agency: Ministry of Home Affairs; Ministry of Education
- School units: 124 (2025)

Facilities
- Campsites: NPCC Camp Resilience, 80 Jalan Noordin, Pulau Ubin, Singapore 506995

Website
- www.npcc.org.sg

The National Police Cadet Corps (NPCC) is one of the national uniformed groups for youths between the ages of 13 to 17 in Singapore. The organisation is supported by the Ministry of Education and the Ministry of Home Affairs. Established in 1959, it trains young boys and girls in the values of law enforcement and public safety. While NPCC adopts police-style training and structure, it holds no actual police authority and primarily serves as an educational and character-building experience through structured simulations and drills.

== Brief history ==
Following Singapore's successful elections of 1959, the new government, among other policies, began to pressure the Singapore Police Force (SPF) to form a youth unit on the lines of the long serving military cadet organisations of the island.

On 8 May that year, the Police Cadet Corps (PCC) was born with then-Commissioner Alan Blades approving the formation of the first police cadet unit. The first platoon of 30 cadets, based in Bartley Secondary School, proved to be a success for the young organisation.

In 1961, the Parliament of Singapore passed the Police Cadet Corps Ordinance, officially endorsing the Corps as a national organisation dedicated to training the young in the values of security in their communities even at a young age, affiliated to the SPF. The Ordinance also gave approval to all schools in Singapore to form PCC units. In 1963, the PCC and the National Cadet Corps (NCC) came under the administration of the Ministry of Education, with the PCC later beginning recruiting females in 1964.

In 1969, the PCC and the NCC were unified under a common structure, leading to the PCC being renamed the National Cadet Corps (Police). This was subsequently changed in 1971 when the organisation was renamed as the National Police Cadet Corps (NPCC), a name that has stuck since then.

== Ranks ==
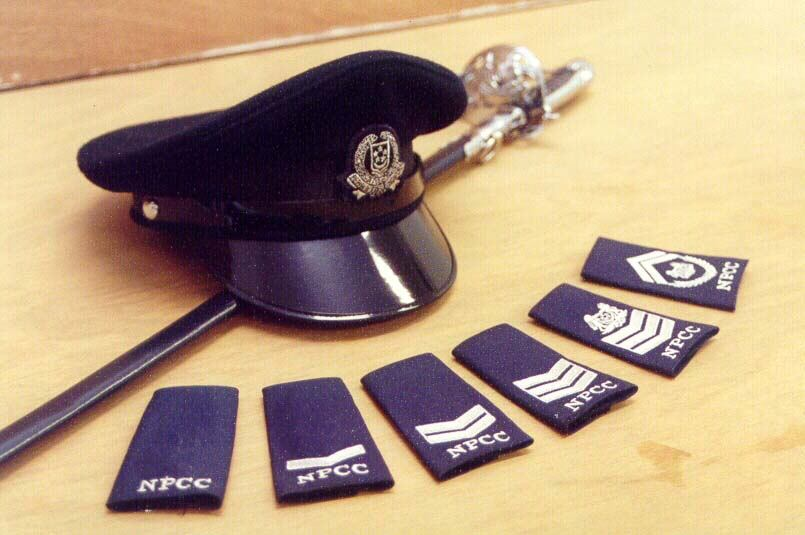
Foreground – from left to right: Cadet, Lance Corporal, Corporal, Sergeant, Staff Sergeant and Station Inspector ranks Background: NPCC peak cap, headdress worn by male Cadet Inspectors, Honorary Officers and Teacher Officers in No. 1 or No .3 attire; NPCC ceremonial sword, ceremonial drill weapon.

As NPCC is affiliated with the Singapore Police Force (SPF), the ranks of NPCC are similar. NPCC ranks have the suffix '(NPCC)' to distinguish them from the SPF ranks.

Honorary Officers (HO), who are appointed volunteer adult leaders, have the prefix 'H/' in their rank, which stands for 'Honorary', to distinguish them from Teacher Officers (TO), teachers assigned to an NPCC unit in a school.

Teacher Officers (TOs) appointed to higher levels of leadership, such as an Officer-in-Charge (OC), Assistant Commandant (AC), or HQ staff officer, but have not yet officially been promoted to the respective rank, will have the prefix 'A/' in their rank, which stands for 'Acting', to denote their status.

Teacher Officers (TOs), Honorary Officers (HOs), and Cadet Inspectors (CIs) who have recently graduated from the Officer Basic Training Course (OBTC), Honorary Officer Basic Training Course (HOBTC), and Cadet Inspector Basic Training Course (CIBTC), respectively, will have the prefix 'P/' in their rank, which stands for 'Probationary', to denote that they are on probation. The probationary period typically lasts one year for TOs and HOs, and six months for CIs.

In addition, Commandant, NPCC typically holds the rank of Superintendent of Police (SUPT). As a senior officer of the SPF, Commandant, NPCC reports to Commander, Training Command (TRACOM) of the SPF.

Ranks of the National Police Cadet Corps
Rank	Notes
Cadet (NPCC) [Cdt (NPCC)]	All cadets start off with this rank upon joining the Corps.
Lance Corporal (NPCC) [LCpl (NPCC)]	Most cadets will be promoted to this rank after 1 year of membership in the Corps.
Corporal (NPCC) [Cpl (NPCC)]	Most cadets will be promoted to this rank after 2 years of membership in the Corps, and will start their leadership duties as cadet leaders.
Sergeant (NPCC) [Sgt (NPCC)]	Most cadets will be promoted to this rank after 3 years of membership in the Corps.
Staff Sergeant (NPCC) [SSgt (NPCC)]	Most cadets will graduate with this rank after 4/5 years of active membership in the Corps.
Station Inspector (NPCC) [SI (NPCC)]	Only cadets who are nominated by their unit and pass an interview will be promoted to this rank.
Cadet Inspector (NPCC) [CI (NPCC)]	Only former cadets who have graduated with the rank of at least Staff Sergeant and have fulfilled selection, training, and probation requirements may be promoted to this rank. Cadet Inspectors (CI) are appointed as volunteer youth leaders in the Corps.
Senior Cadet Inspector (NPCC) [SCI (NPCC)]	Only CIs who have served a minimum of 2 years, are nominated, have made significant contributions, and demonstrated a high level of commitment will be promoted to this rank.
Inspector (NPCC) [Insp (NPCC)]	This rank and all ranks above it can only be held by TOs, who are attached to the NPCC unit of each school. TOs must pass the Officer Basic Training Course to be promoted to this rank.
Assistant Superintendent of Police (NPCC) [ASP (NPCC)]	Most Officers-in-Charge Unit (OC Unit), who are TOs that are appointed to take charge of the school's NPCC unit, are promoted to this rank after certain years of service.
Deputy Superintendent of Police (NPCC) [DSP (NPCC)]	Only NPCC HQ Staff Officers, who are Character and Citizenship Education officers under the Ministry of Education, and ACs, who are HOs or TOs appointed to take charge of a NPCC area, are promoted to this rank after certain years of service.

== Activities ==
Training may be held once or twice a week, depending on the school unit. Cadets can attain proficiency badges after completing the courses.

They may also participate in Area level activities, such as area-based camps at Camp Resilience, or even international activities, such as at the overseas educational visits to Brunei or Hong Kong.

== See also ==
- Singapore Police Force
- National service in Singapore
- National Cadet Corps (Singapore)
- National Civil Defence Cadet Corps
