= Association of Top Achiever Scouts =

- Founded: December 10, 2004; 21 years ago
- Founders: Simon Hang-bock Rhee, Eric Khoo Heng-Pheng, Alexander Wong
- Membership: 11,000+ (2022)
- Affiliation: World Organization of the Scout Movement
- Website www.atasapr.org

The Association of Top Achiever Scouts (ATAS) is a worldwide Scouting fellowship group, of Scouts and Scouters who have achieved the highest rank as a youth in their Scout associations such as King's Scout, Queen's Scout, President's Scout, Fuji Scout, Eagle Scout, etc.

Developed and formed during the 21st Asia-Pacific Region Scout Conference in Brunei on 10 December 2004 by Simon Hang-bock Rhee of Korea, Eric Khoo Heng-Pheng of Malaysia, and Alexander Wong of Hong Kong, the association has spread to the other regions of the World Organization of the Scout Movement. Wong serves ATAS as Membership Director.

== See also ==
- List of highest awards in Scouting
