= Alexander Wong =

- 王建明

Assistant Chief Commissioner of the Scout Association of Hong Kong
- Incumbent
- Assumed office 1997

Alexander Wong Kin Ming (Chinese: 王建明; Jyutping: Wong^{4} Gin^{3}-ming^{4}; born c. 1951) of Hong Kong served as the Assistant Chief Commissioner (since 1997) and the International Commissioner of the Scout Association of Hong Kong (from May 1997 to December 2001), as well as the Chairman of the Asia-Pacific Regional Governance Review Task Force.

Wong joined Scouting as a boy in 1961. He was warranted as Scoutmaster after becoming a Queen's Scout in 1968. He had his first Headquarters appointment as Project Officer (Headquarters Commissioner) in 1970.

With Simon Hang-bock Rhee of Korea and Eric Khoo Heng-Pheng of Malaysia, Wong developed the Association of Top Achiever Scouts (ATAS), a fellowship group formed during the 21st APR Scout Conference in Brunei in December 2004, of Scouts and Scouters who have achieved the highest rank as a youth in their Scout associations-Queen Scout, President's Scout, Fuji Scout, Eagle Scout, etc. Wong serves ATAS as Membership Director.

In 2010, Wong was awarded the 328th Bronze Wolf, the only distinction of the World Organization of the Scout Movement, awarded by the World Scout Committee for exceptional services to world Scouting. In addition, Wong has received various Scout awards from the Philippines, Singapore, Thailand, Taiwan and Canada.

Wong was educated in the St. Joan of Arc School, King's College, Hong Kong, the University of Hong Kong and the Inns of Court School of Law in England. He obtained his first degree in 1974 before he pursued his study of the law. He was called to the English Bar (Gray's Inn) in 1979. Wong first served as a Crown Counsel in the Attorney General's Chambers in Hong Kong before he went into private practice at the Hong Kong Bar in 1981. Wong is married and lives in Hong Kong.
