= Aida Garifullina =

Russian lyric soprano (born 1987)

- Аида Гарифуллина
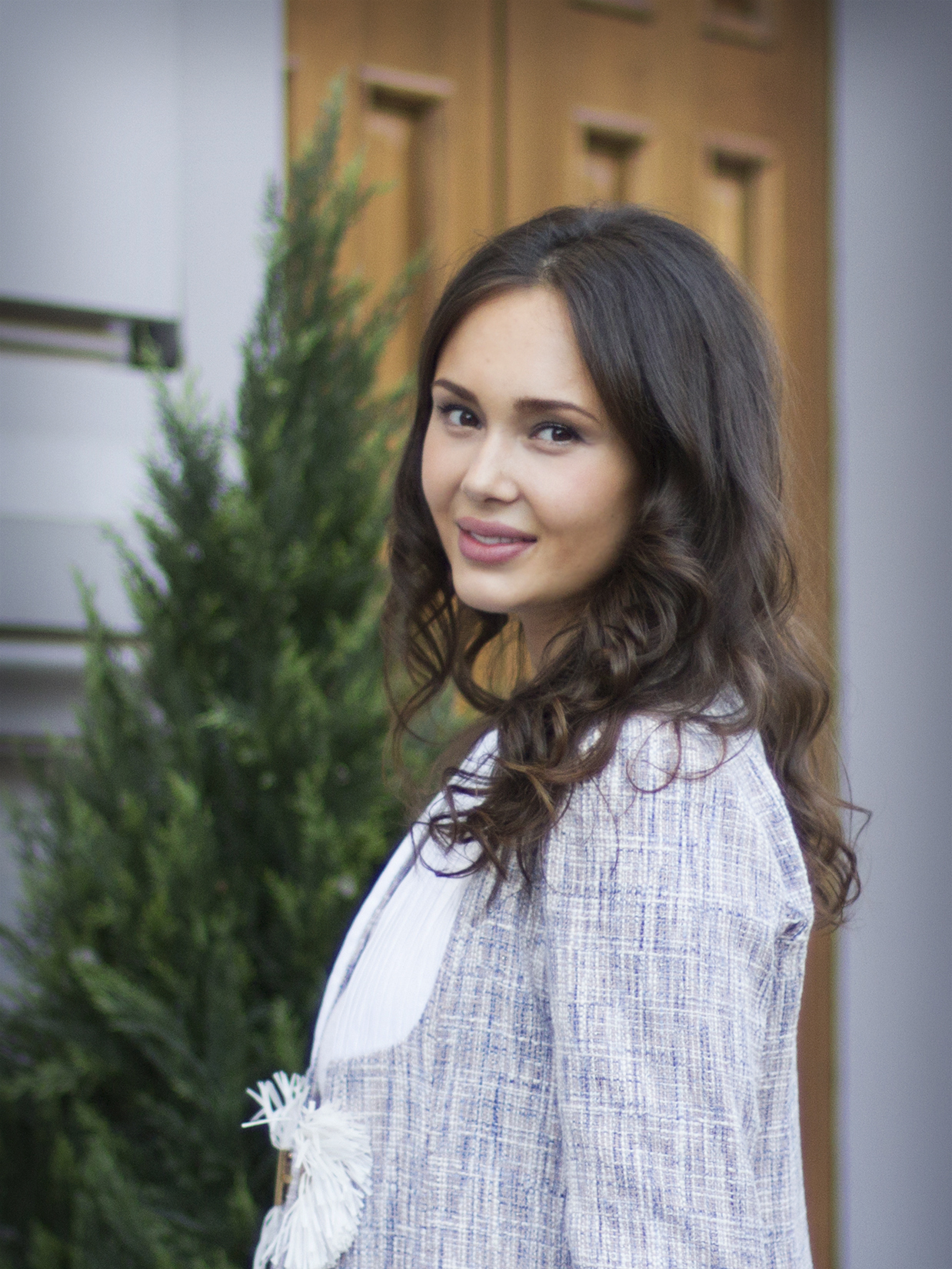
- Garifullina in 2014
- Born: 30 September 1987 (age 39); Kazan, Russian SFSR, Soviet Union
- Occupation: Lyric soprano
- Years active: 2007-present
- Spouse: Alexey Vorobyov (2025)

Aida Emilevna Garifullina (Russian: Аида Эмилевна Гарифуллина, Tatar: Аида Эмил кызы Гарифуллина, romanized: Aida Emil qızı Ğarifullina; born on 30 September 1987) is a Russian lyric soprano of Tatar descent. She was the winner of the 2013 Operalia competition and has featured in a number of productions staged at the Mariinsky Theatre, St. Petersburg and the Vienna State Opera. She has a recording contract with Decca Records.

== Biography and musical career ==
=== Early career ===
Aida Garifullina was born in 1987 in a Tatar family in Kazan, the capital of the Republic of Tatarstan. Her father is Emil Damirovich Garifullin, and her mother is Layla Ildarovna Garifullina (a choir conductor), who is currently the Director of the Centre of Contemporary Music, n.a. Sofia Gubaidulina. From her early childhood Garifullina's musical development was influenced by her mother, who was instrumental in the development of her career. At the age of 18, Garifullina moved to Nuremberg, Germany to study music.

In 2007, she joined the Vienna University of Music and Performing Arts under Claudia Visca. Two years later Garifullina made her debut as Despina in the university production of Mozart's Così fan tutte. In 2010, she won the Muslim Magomayev's competition of singers in Moscow.

After graduating in 2011, she performed during the closing ceremony of the XXVI Summer Universiade in Shenzhen, and sang a duet with Alessandro Safina in Kazan.

In 2012, Garifullina sang at the opening of the Russian House at the XXX Summer Olympics in London. In London, she became acquainted with Valery Gergiev, the artistic director of the Mariinsky Theatre in St. Petersburg. In January 2013, she made her debut at the Mariinsky Theatre in the role of Susanna in Mozart's The Marriage of Figaro. She later added to her repertoire the roles of Gilda (Rigoletto) and Adina (L'elisir d'amore).

In July, as the Ambassador of the Universiade, she sang at the opening Ceremony of Summer Universiade 2013 in Kazan. She also performed at the closing ceremony of "Cultural Universiade" with the Mariinsky Theatre Orchestra. The performance was conducted by Valery Gergiev.

=== Operalia 2013 and subsequent career ===
Garifullina's career received a significant boost when she won first prize in Operalia 2013. At the contest, there were arias of Nanetta (Falstaff), Snow Maiden (The Snow Maiden), Susanna (Le nozze di Figaro), and Giulietta (I Capuleti e i Montecchi). In October she was awarded the title "Honored Artist of the Republic of Tatarstan" and a Commendation Certificate of the President of the Republic of Tatarstan.

During 2013 and 2014 she was featured in a number of prominent performances, alongside the likes of José Carreras, Plácido Domingo and Dmitry Hvorostovsky. In 2014 she performed at the Rosenblatt Recitals held at the Wigmore Hall, London. 2015 saw her sign a recording contract with Decca Records.

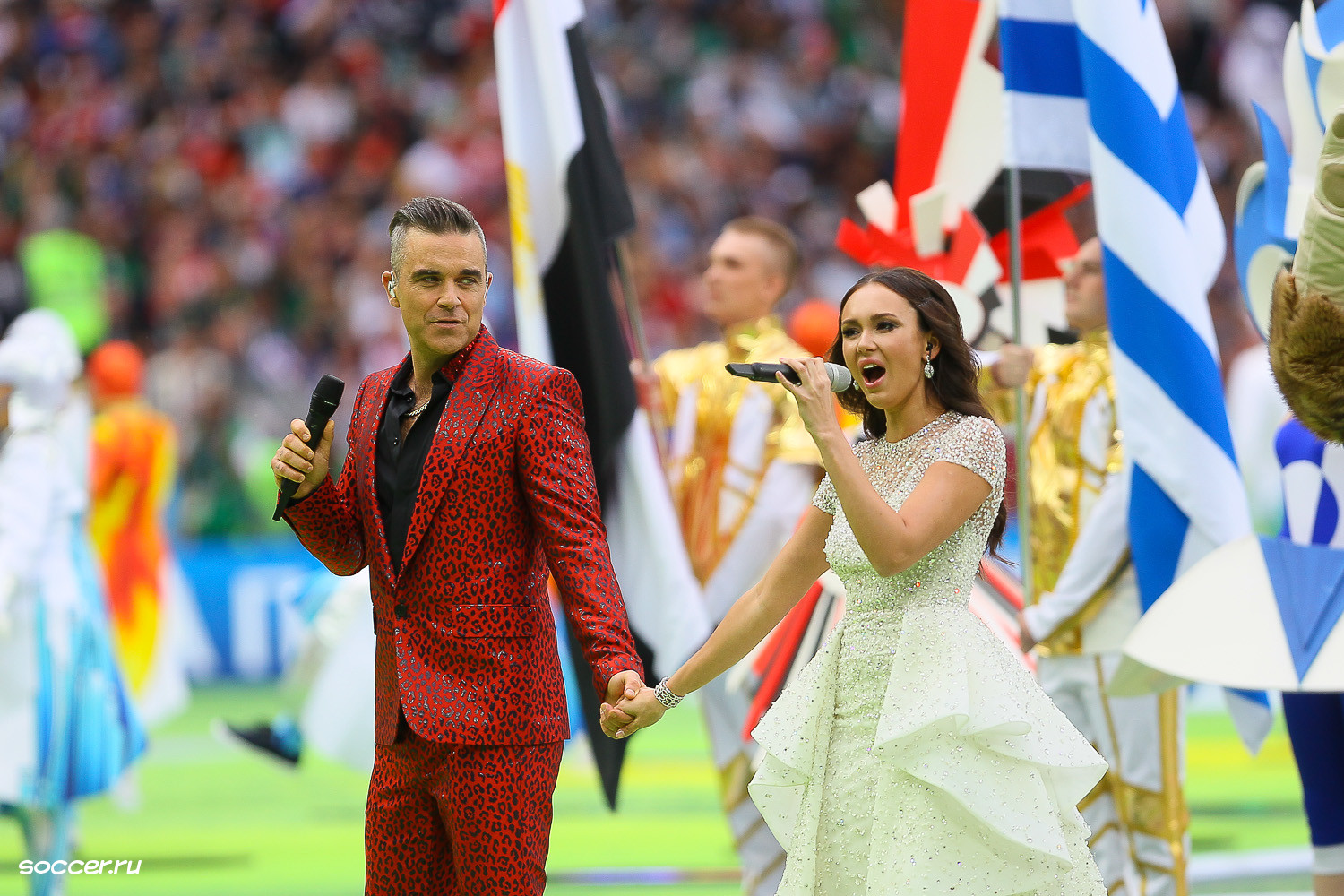
Robbie Williams and Garifullina singing "Angels" at the 2018 FIFA World Cup opening ceremony

Since the beginning of the 2014/2015 season, she is an ensemble member of the Vienna State Opera. She portrayed the French-American soprano star Lily Pons and performed "The Bell Song" from Delibes' opera Lakmé in a downward-transposed key in the 2016 film Florence Foster Jenkins. In February 2017 she released a self-titled album on Decca, which contains 15 arias recorded with the ORF Radio-Symphony Orchestra directed by Cornelius Meister.

On 13 June 2018, Garifullina performed at the 2018 FIFA World Cup opening gala concert held at the Red Square in Moscow. She performed with Anna Netrebko, Juan Diego Florez and Placido Domingo and the Mariinsky Theatre Orchestra conducted by Valery Gergiev. On 14 June, Garifullina performed at the 2018 FIFA World Cup opening ceremony held at the Luzhniki Stadium in Moscow. She performed a duet of "Angels" with English pop singer Robbie Williams.

== Personal life ==
Garifullina has one sibling, a brother named Rem. Garifullina has a daughter, Olivia, born in 2016. She is known to have dated tennis player Marat Safin for a year or two from 2016 to 2017. Early in 2025, she secretly married the famous Russian singer Alexey Vorobyov and together they hosted Intervision 2025 held at the Live Arena in Novoivanovskoye near the city of Moscow, Russia, on 20 September 2025. Her voice coach for 2 years while studying in Vienna in 2007 was Claudia Visca, an American soprano. Her favorite well-known opera soprano is Anna Moffo.

== Repertoire ==
- G. Donizetti – Don Pasquale, Norina
- G. Donizetti – L'elisir d'amore, Adina
- P. Eötvös – Tri sestri, Irina
- C. Gounod − Roméo et Juliette, Juliette
- F. Halévy – La Juive, Princess Eudoxie
- W. A. Mozart – Così fan tutte, Despina
- W. A. Mozart – Don Giovanni, Zerlina
- W. A. Mozart – Le nozze di Figaro, Susanna
- W. A. Mozart – Die Zauberflöte, Pamina
- S. S. Prokofiev – War and Peace, Natasha Rostova
- G. Puccini – La bohème, Mimi, Musetta
- N. A. Rimsky-Korsakov – The Golden Cockerel, Queen of Shemakha
- N. A. Rimsky-Korsakov – The Snow Maiden, The Snow Maiden
- G. Rossini – L'italiana in Algeri, Elvira
- P. I. Tchaikovsky - Yevgeny Onegin, Tatyana
- G. Verdi – Un ballo in maschera, Oscar
- G. Verdi – Falstaff, Nannetta
- G. Verdi – Rigoletto, Gilda
- G. Verdi - La Traviata, Violetta

== Selected discography ==
- Aida Garifullina (2017)

== Awards and titles ==
- "Best Female Vocalist in Classical Music" at the Russian National Music Awards (2015).
