= List of Copa América official mascots =

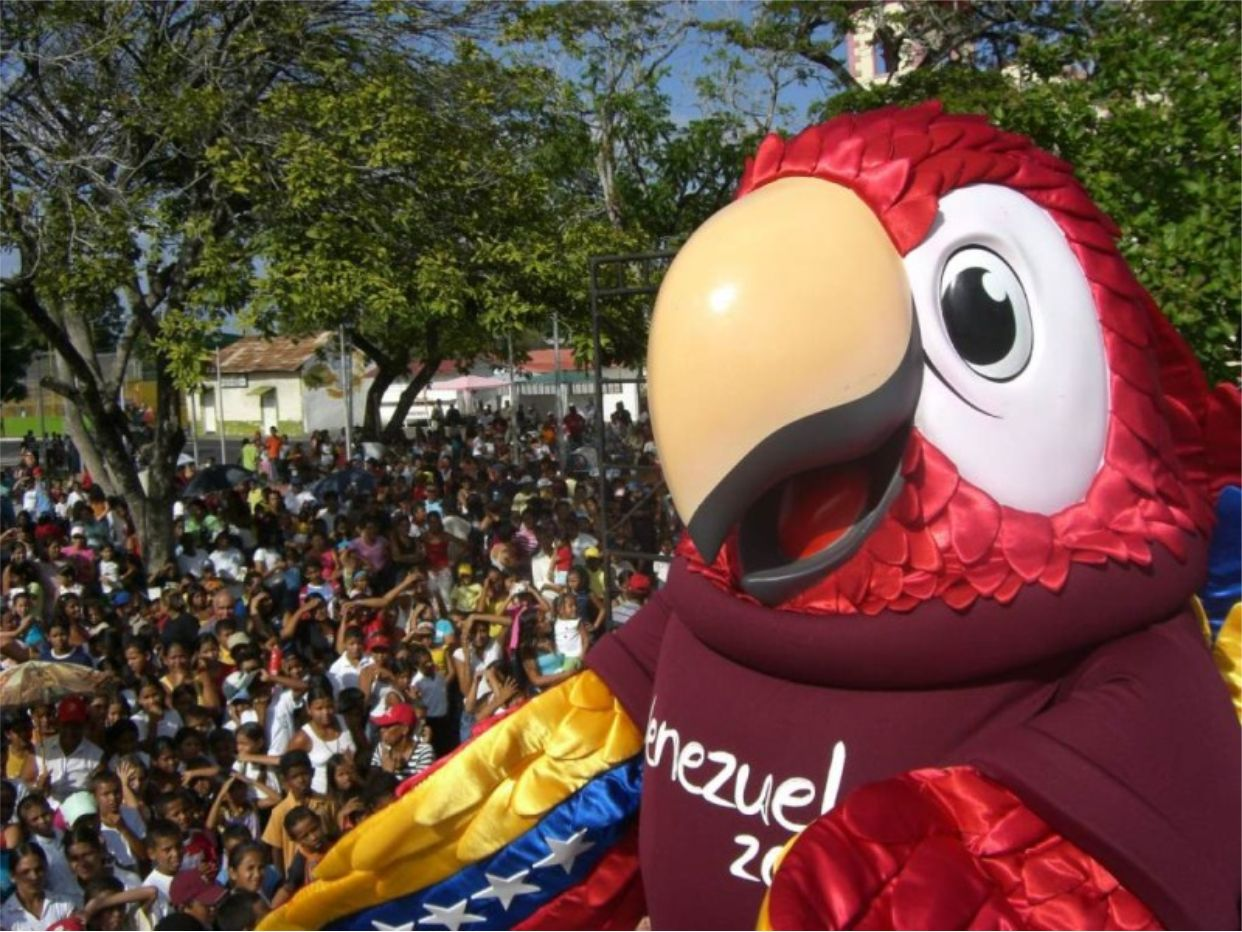
Guaky, the mascot of the 2007 Copa América

Each Copa América event since 1987 has its own mascot. Gardelito, the mascot for the 1987 competition, was the first Copa América mascot. The mascot designs show some representing a characteristic feature (costume, flora, fauna, etc.) of the host country. The Copa América mascot is frequently one or more anthropomorphic characters targeted at children with cartoon shows and other merchandise released to coincide with the competition.

== List of mascots ==
Edition	Name	Description	Refs.
Argentina 1987	Gardelito	A doll representing the famous tango singer Carlos Gardel.	
Brazil 1989	Tico	A rufous-bellied thrush in Brazil's reserve blue kit.	
Chile 1991	Guaso	A huaso with the colors of the flag of Chile.	
Ecuador 1993	Choclito	A corn cob with the colors of the flag of Ecuador.	
Uruguay 1995	Torito	A bull in a Uruguay national team kit.	
Bolivia 1997	Tatu	A nine-banded armadillo.	
Paraguay 1999	Tagua	A peccary drinking tereré.	
Colombia 2001	Ameriko	An alien in the colors of the flag of Colombia. His name is derived from the word for America in Esperanto.	
Peru 2004	Chasqui	Chasquis were messengers of the Inca empire, well known for their athleticism.	
Venezuela 2007	Guaky	A scarlet macaw, a bird representative of Venezuela. He wore the traditional burgundy jersey of the Venezuela national football team. His wings have the tricolor national flag, as well as its eight stars on them.	
Argentina 2011	Tangolero	An American rhea (ñandú). Its name is a portmanteau which combines the words tango and gol (Spanish for "goal"); a literal translation could be Tangoaler.	
Chile 2015	Zincha	A culpeo fox unveiled on 17 November 2014. The name of the mascot was chosen by the public over two other options, "Andi" and "Kul".	
Brazil 2019	Zizito	A capybara. The mascot was unveiled on 5 April 2019 and first seen on Brazilian TV network Rede Globo. The name was decided on 12 April 2019 naming "Zizito" after legendary Brazilian footballer Zizinho, over one option "Capibi".	
Brazil 2021	Pibe	A dog described as "funny, cheerful, agile and unique". The mascot was unveiled on 1 December 2019.	
United States 2024	Capitán	An eagle representing strength, boldness, and excellence.	

== See also ==
- List of FIFA World Cup official mascots
- List of FIFA Women's World Cup official mascots
- List of UEFA European Championship official mascots
- List of Africa Cup of Nations official mascots
- List of AFC Asian Cup official mascots
