= Slavek and Slavko =

Slavek and Slavko is a official mascots of Euro 2012, was officially introduced on September 22, 2010.

His name is a combination of "Slavek," the international abbreviation of the two countries, and "Slavko," which means "number 20" in many European languages. The two colors, red and blue, are the colors of the national teams of Poland and Ukraine.

The mascots' birthdays coincide with Youth Day in Poland and Ukraine. 1990 also marked the first non-racial elections in both countries. Warner Bros. designed the mascots.

The official slogan for Slavek & Slavko is: "Slavek & Slavko's game is Fair Play." This slogan appeared on the electronic billboards for UEFA Euro 2012.
