= Zakumi =

Mascot for the 2010 World Cup

- Zakumi the Leopard, the official mascot for the 2010 FIFA World Cup in South Africa.
- Genre: Sports, Comedy
- Anime television series

Zakumi
- Directed by: Alexander Wong
- Produced by: Patrick Keller
- Written by: Andries Odendaal
- Original network: NHK; SABC
- Original run: 2010; 16 years ago
- Episodes: 20

Zakumi the Leopard was the official mascot of the 2010 FIFA World Cup held in South Africa. He is an anthropomorphized leopard with green hair who was announced on September 22, 2008.

His name comes from "ZA", the ISO 3166-1 alpha-2 code for South Africa, and Kumi, a word that means "ten" in several African languages, signifying "South Africa 2010".

== Description ==
Lucas Radebe, a South African football player, described the character as "want[ing] to create a good mood for the fans and raise the excitement for the 2010 FIFA World Cup, the first on African soil. He is a proud South African and wants to ensure that the world will come together in South Africa."

Andries Odendaal, from Cape Town, created the original character design and the promotional costume was produced by Cora Simpson. The leopard's birth date coincides with a day known and celebrated as Youth Day in South Africa.

The green and yellow (gold) colours of the character match the colours used in South African sport uniforms and can also be seen on the South Africa national football team's kit.

The official motto of Zakumi is "Zakumi's game is Fair Play", first seen in the digital advertisement boards during the 2009 FIFA Confederations Cup, before appearing again in the 2010 FIFA World Cup.

== Animated series ==
Following the World Cup, a 20-episode animated series aired called "Zakumi" also known as "Zakumi The Animated Series". The series was created by Hong Kongese group Jidou Studios, whose YouTube page contains 8 of the first 10 episodes..

== Controversies ==
A contract for the manufacture of Zakumi figurines was awarded to a company owned by Dr. Shiaan-Bin Huang, who is an ANC representative member in the South African Parliament. The manufacture of the figurines was outsourced to Shanghai Fashion Plastic Products in China. The value of the contract was in excess of US$112 million.

Due to concerns over the loss of jobs in the South African manufacturing sector, the Congress of South African Trade Unions (COSATU) suggested that more merchandise be sourced locally.

The allegation of sweatshop conditions at the Shanghai Fashion Plastic Products factory led to an audit by Global Brands Group (master licensee of the brand FIFA World Cup 2010), which revealed a number of non-compliance issues with policies of GBC. The manufacturer denied the allegations of sweatshop conditions and claimed that the working conditions at the Shanghai Fashion Plastic Products factory were "very good".

== See also ==
- FIFA World Cup mascots
- 2010 FIFA World Cup

Preceded by Goleo VI, Pille	FIFA World Cup mascot Zakumi; FIFA 2010	Succeeded by Fuleco
