= 2018 FIFA World Cup opening ceremony =

Opening ceremony of the 2018 FIFA World Cup ceremony

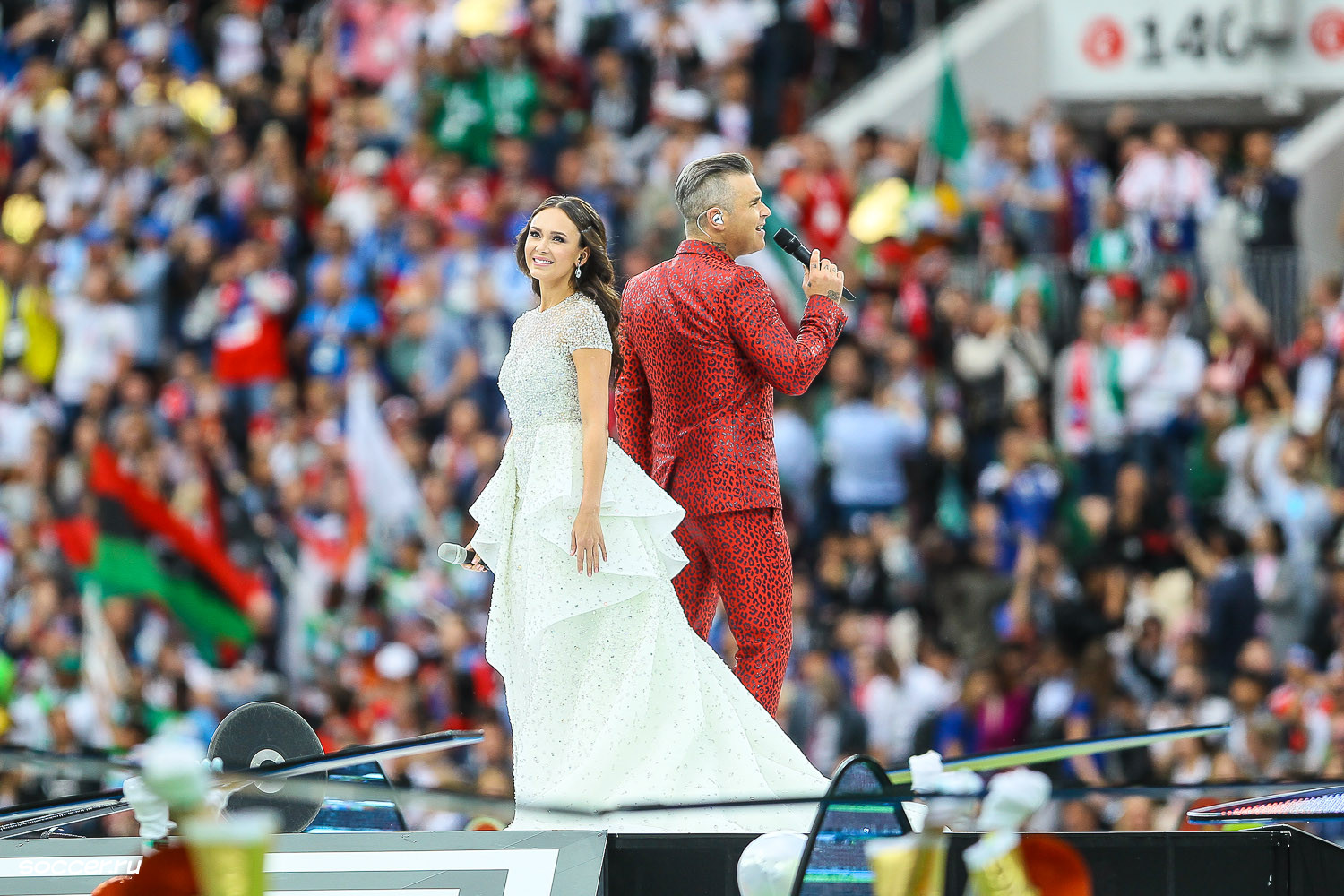
- Aida Garifullina and Robbie Williams performing on stage.
- Date: 14 June 2018
- Time: 17:30 Moscow Standard Time (UTC+3)
- Location: Luzhniki Stadium, Moscow, Russia

The 2018 FIFA World Cup opening ceremony took place on Thursday, 14 June 2018, at the Luzhniki Stadium in Moscow, Russia at 3:30 (BST), about a half hour before the opening match which Russia won 5–0 over Saudi Arabia.

== Mascots ==
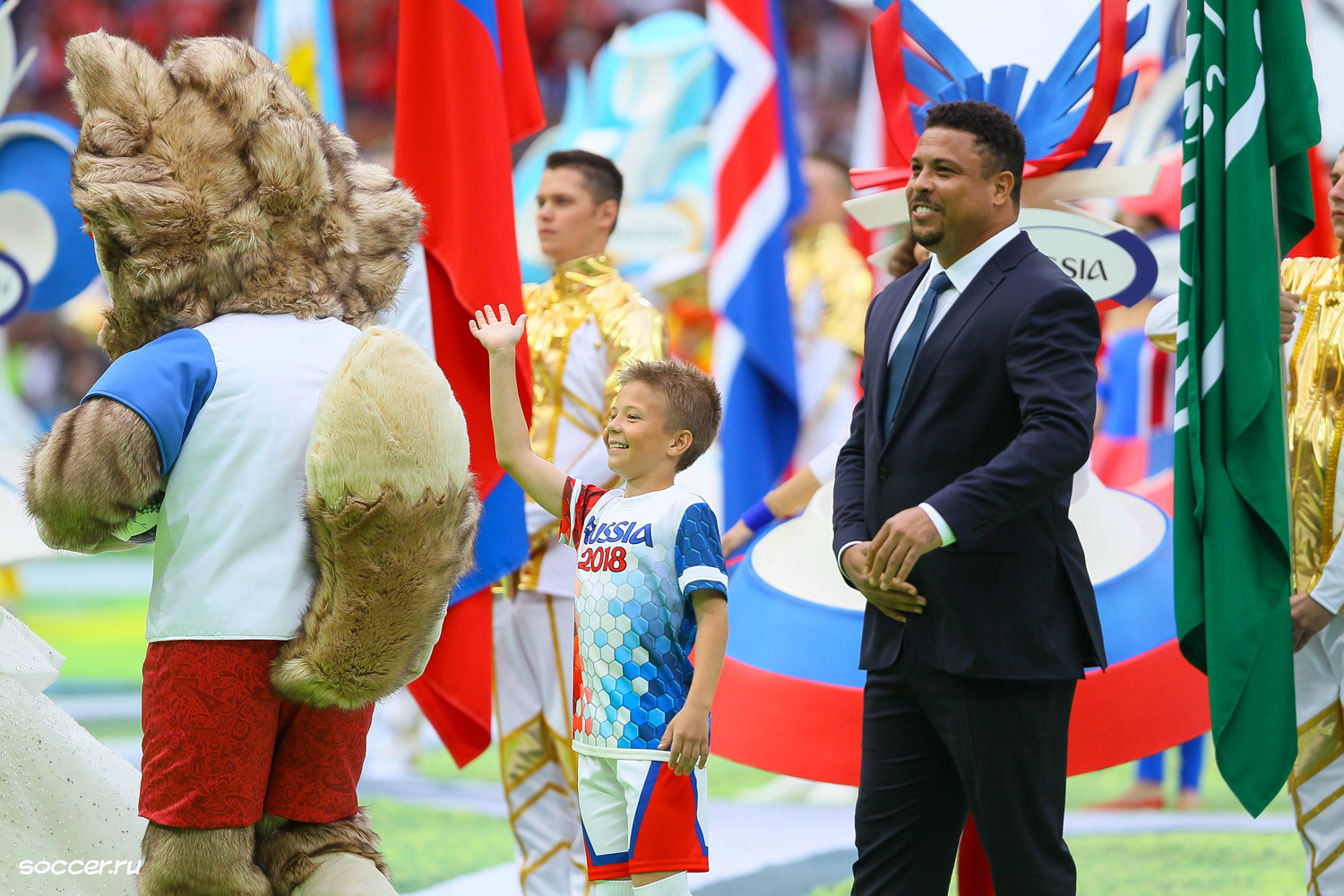
Zabivaka (left) and Ronaldo (right) were mascots for the opening ceremony.

Zabivaka (English: "The one who scores"), was the official mascot for the 2018 FIFA World Cup and was voted for by a 53% margin. The design is of a wolf who represents fun, charm, and character. Former world cup winning, Brazilian striker Ronaldo was another mascot of the tournament. Ronaldo was the intended man to deliver the ceremonial first kick of the tournament but instead, he gave that honor to the child mascot who passed the official match ball to Zabivaka in order to start the tournament. The match ball (an Adidas Telstar 18) was sent into space with the International Space Station crew in March and came back to Earth in early June.

== Speeches ==
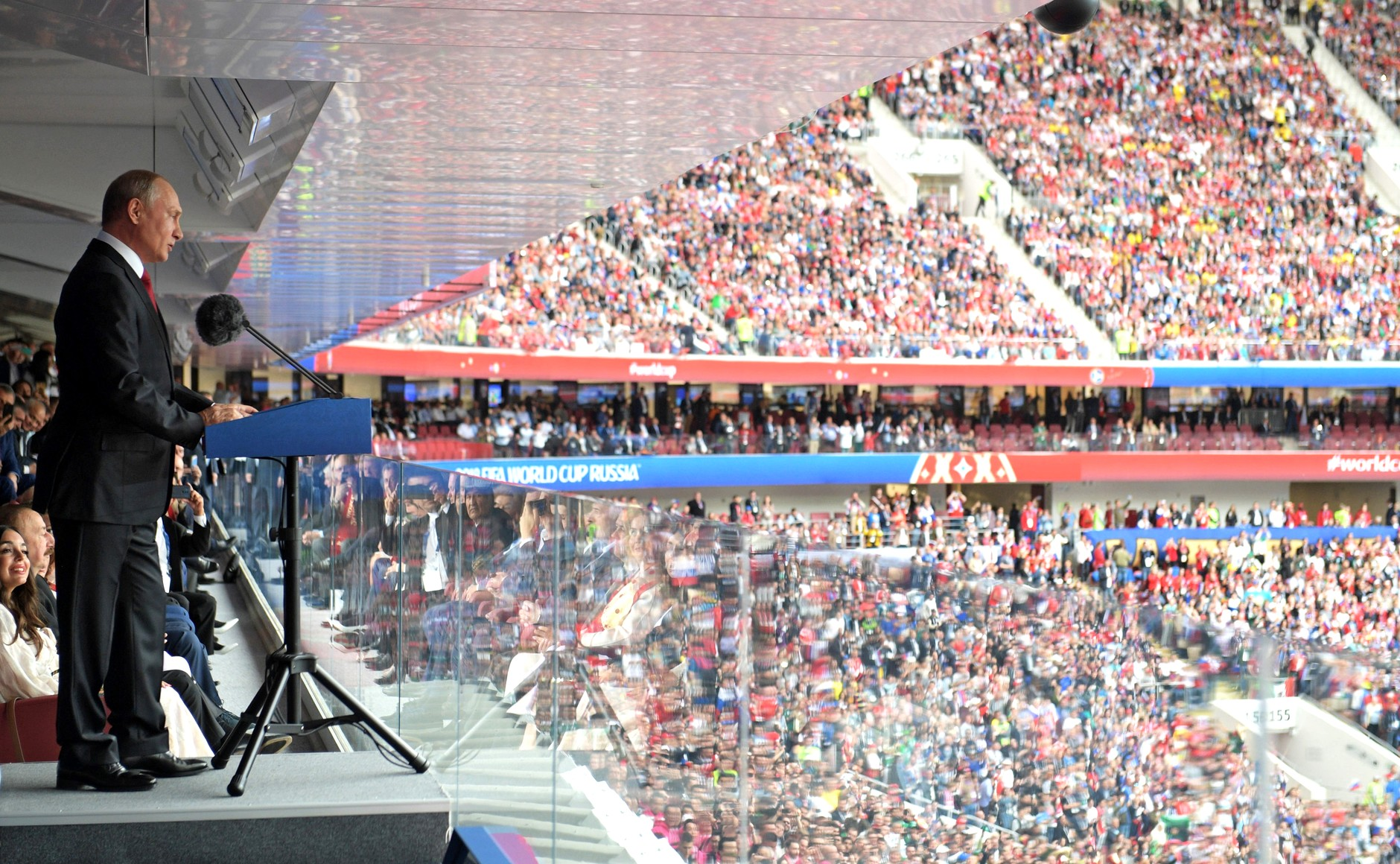
Russian President Vladimir Putin giving the opening speech of the tournament.

Russian President Vladimir Putin gave the opening speech of the tournament in which he talked about an "open, hospitable and friendly" Russia hosting the tournament. He also described Russia's love for football, calling the tournament and the game "a unity which cannot be affected by a different language, ideology or faith". Putin ended by saying:

“Our duty is to preserve this power of humanity for generations to come for the sake of developing sports and strengthening peace and mutual understanding between people. I wish all the teams’ success and an unforgettable experience for the fans. Welcome to Russia.”

Putin's speech was immediately followed by a short speech from FIFA President Gianni Infantino who said:

“Welcome to the FIFA World Cup here in Russia. As of today, for one month, football will conquer Russia and from Russia, football will conquer the world. Enjoy the biggest celebration on earth. Thank you President Putin, thank you Moscow, Spasibo [thank you] Russia.”

Following the two speeches the performance of the ceremony were allowed to commence before the opening match between Russia and Saudi Arabia.

== Performances ==
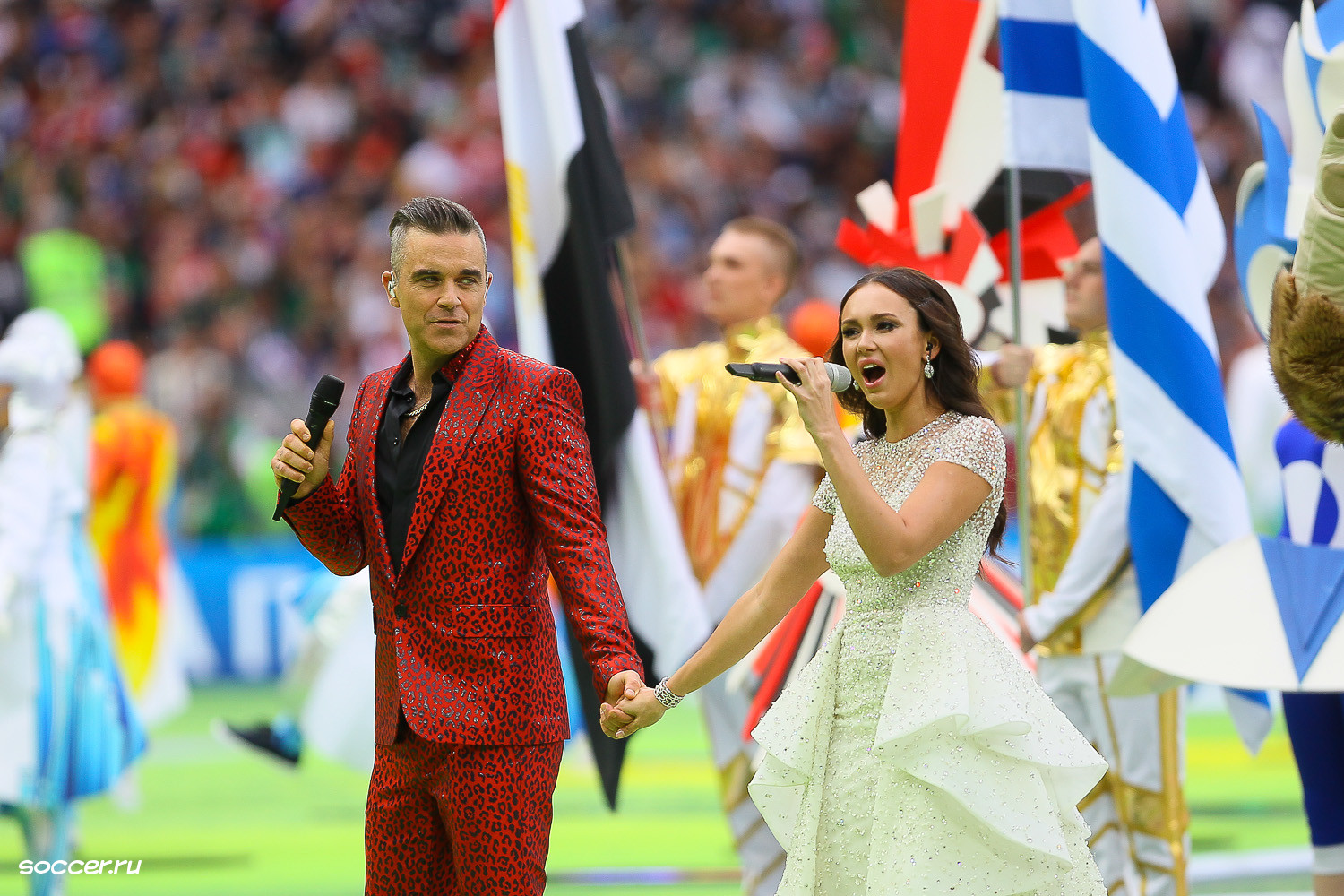
British singer Robbie Williams and Russian soprano Aida Garifullina performing "Angels" at the World Cup opening ceremony.

British pop singer Robbie Williams took centre stage at the end of the ceremony with a rendition of "Let Me Entertain You" before Russian soprano Aida Garifullina was carried out on to the pitch on the back of a "firebird" float. Williams sang a section of "Feel" before he and Garifullina performed a duet of "Angels" as performers emerged, dressed in the flags of all 32 teams and carrying a sign bearing the name of each nation. Williams then sang "Rock DJ" in an encore as the pitch was being cleared for the first match.

=== Controversy ===
During the encore, Williams gave the middle finger. Fox in the US apologised for the incident. The incident was not shown on ITV in the UK who had cut away prior to the encore. In addition, while singing Rock DJ, Williams sung, "Pimpin' ain't easy. Most of them fleece me, but I did this for free." The lyrics "But I did this for free" replaced the lyrics "Every night".

Williams appeared on This Morning on 19 June and explained what happened, “It was one minute to kick off, I was under a lot of pressure, because there was one minute left and I didn't know how I was going to do half a minute, so I just did a one-minute countdown [using his middle finger].” Asked by presenter Phillip Schofield whether he regrets it, he said: "Yeah, of course, yeah. I cannot trust me. And the last thing I said to my manager before we sat down on the sofa here was, 'what could go wrong,' because I don't know what I'm going to do at any time. There's no, sort of, plan. The plan was, sing in key, don't fall over. That was the plan and 99% of the plan, I pulled off.” When asked did the idea just enter his head he responded, “Nothing actually pops into my head. There's a block between me and sense... then something happens and then five minutes later, I'm like, 'Did I? Yeah, I did, didn't I?”. Williams changing his lyrics "every night" is still unexplained.

== Dignitaries in attendance ==
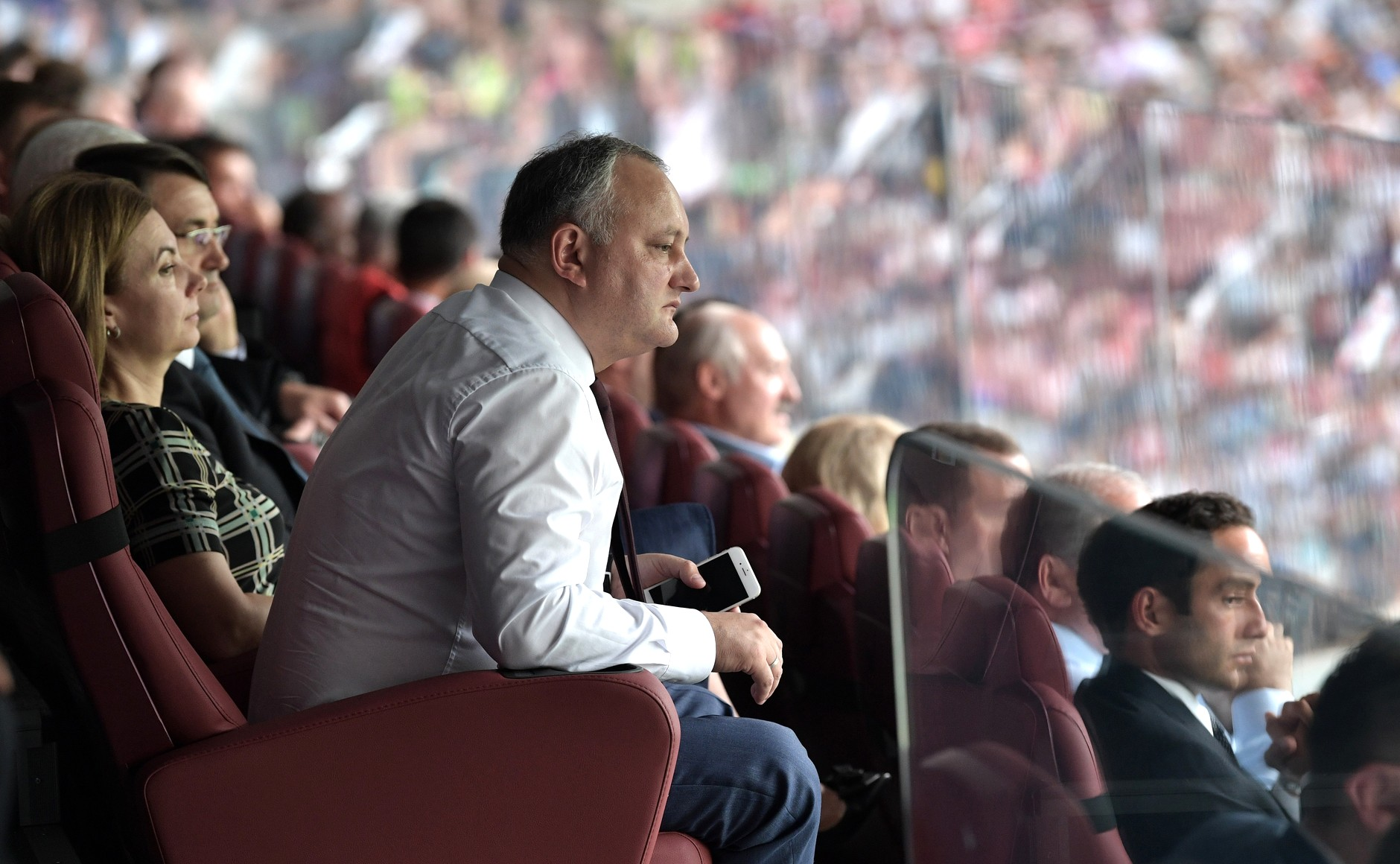
Moldovan President Igor Dodon at the opening ceremony.

A total of 21 foreign heads of state attended this match. It was the largest gathering of leaders for a FIFA World Cup match.

- President of Abkhazia – Raul Khajimba
- Prime Minister of Armenia – Nikol Pashinyan
- President of Azerbaijan – Ilham Aliyev
- President of Belarus – Alexander Lukashenko
- President of Bolivia – Evo Morales
- Vice Premier of the State Council of China – Sun Chunlan
- (Commonwealth of Independent States) Secretary General of CIS – Sergei Lebedev
- Former President of France – Nicolas Sarkozy
- President of FIFA – Gianni Infantino
- Former Chancellor of Germany – Gerhard Schroeder
- President of Gabon – Ali Bongo Ondimba
- President of Kazakhstan – Nursultan Nazarbayev
- President of Kyrgyzstan – Sooronbay Jeenbekov
- Prime Minister of Hungary – Viktor Orban
- Prime Minister of Lebanon – Saad Hariri
- President of Moldova – Igor Dodon
- Prince of Monaco – Albert II
- President of the Supreme People's Assembly of North Korea – Kim Yong-nam
- President of Panama – Juan Carlos Varela
- President of Paraguay – Mario Abdo Benítez
- President of Portugal – Marcelo Rebelo de Sousa
- President of Russia – Vladimir Putin
- President of Rwanda – Paul Kagame
- Crown Prince of Saudi Arabia – Mohammed bin Salman
- President of South Ossetia – Anatoly Bibilov
- President of Tajikistan – Emomali Rahmon
- President of Turkmenistan – Gurbanguly Berdimuhamedow
- Secretary-General of the United Nations – António Guterres
- President of Uzbekistan – Shavkat Mirziyoyev
