= Fuleco =

- Official artwork
- First appearance: 2014 FIFA World Cup

In-universe information
- Species: Brazilian three-banded armadillo
- Gender: Male
- Nationality: Brazilian

Fuleco (Portuguese: [fuˈlɛku]) was the official mascot of the 2014 FIFA World Cup, hosted in Brazil. Fuleco is a Brazilian three-banded armadillo, a species of armadillo which is native to Brazil and categorized as a vulnerable species on the IUCN Red List. Fuleco was officially launched as part of Brazilian broadcaster TV Globo's weekly Fantástico entertainment show on 25 November 2012.

His name is a portmanteau of the Portuguese words futebol ("football") and ecologia ("ecology"). The mascot, with his message of environmental concerns, ecology and sport, turned out to be very popular with football teams around the world.

== Creation and design ==
Fuleco's birthday coincides with New Year's Day. He is a Brazilian three-banded armadillo, which is an endangered species, and plays a major part in the environmental drive.

Over 90% of Brazilians believe Brazil 2014 should be environmentally friendly. The name Fuleco was chosen over the names Amijubi (Amizade – "Friendship" and Júbilo – "Joy") and Zuzeco (Azul – "Blue" and Ecologia – "Ecology") by more than 1.7 million football fans. Fuleco won with 48% of the vote.

The final mascot design was chosen after FIFA and the Local Organizing Committee had analyzed 47 different proposals created by six different Brazilian agencies. The designs were further analyzed through extensive research carried out amongst its primary target audience, Brazilian children between the ages of five and twelve, with the favourite being the armadillo, created by 100%Design. Fuleco is seen as a cheerful and appealing personality.

Independent research carried out on behalf of FIFA stated that 89% of Brazilians questioned said they had seen the mascot, and it gained favourable scores as a likeable character.

== Controversy ==
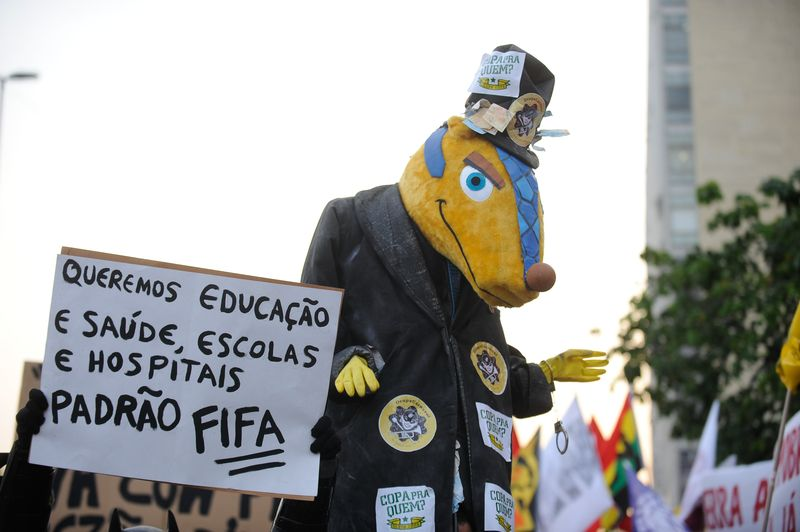
Brazilian protestors demonstrating against the World Cup portray Fuleco as a symbol of greed.

Environmental group the Caatinga Association, an organization whose campaigning helped FIFA choose the armadillo as its mascot, claimed that FIFA has not given any money to support the endangered species. FIFA acknowledged that it does not have any connection with organisations attempting to help the species despite expecting to make profits from selling merchandise based on their mascot.

== See also ==
- Environmental issues in Brazil
- FIFA World Cup mascots
- Wildlife of Brazil
- Vinicius and Tom

Preceded by Zakumi	FIFA World Cup mascot Fuleco; FIFA 2014	Succeeded by Zabivaka
