= ENVER =

American video game developer

- Formerly: Enver Studio
- Type: Private
- Industry: Video games
- Founded: 2021
- Headquarters: New York City
- Key people: Kyle Joyce (CEO)
- Products: Video games
- Number of employees: 200
- Website: enver.com

ENVER is an American video game developer based in New York City. Founded in 2021, the company develops social video games across virtual reality, mobile, and other platforms. It is known for titles including MotoX and Scary Baboon, and is the developer behind the revival of the FIFA video game series, working alongside publisher Solace.

== History ==
The studio's first title, MotoX, a multiplayer VR motocross racing game, was released in 2022. Since launch, it has been one of the most popular games on the Meta store. In March 2026, the studio announced that the game would become free-to-play, with UploadVR noting this followed a wider industry trend towards this model.

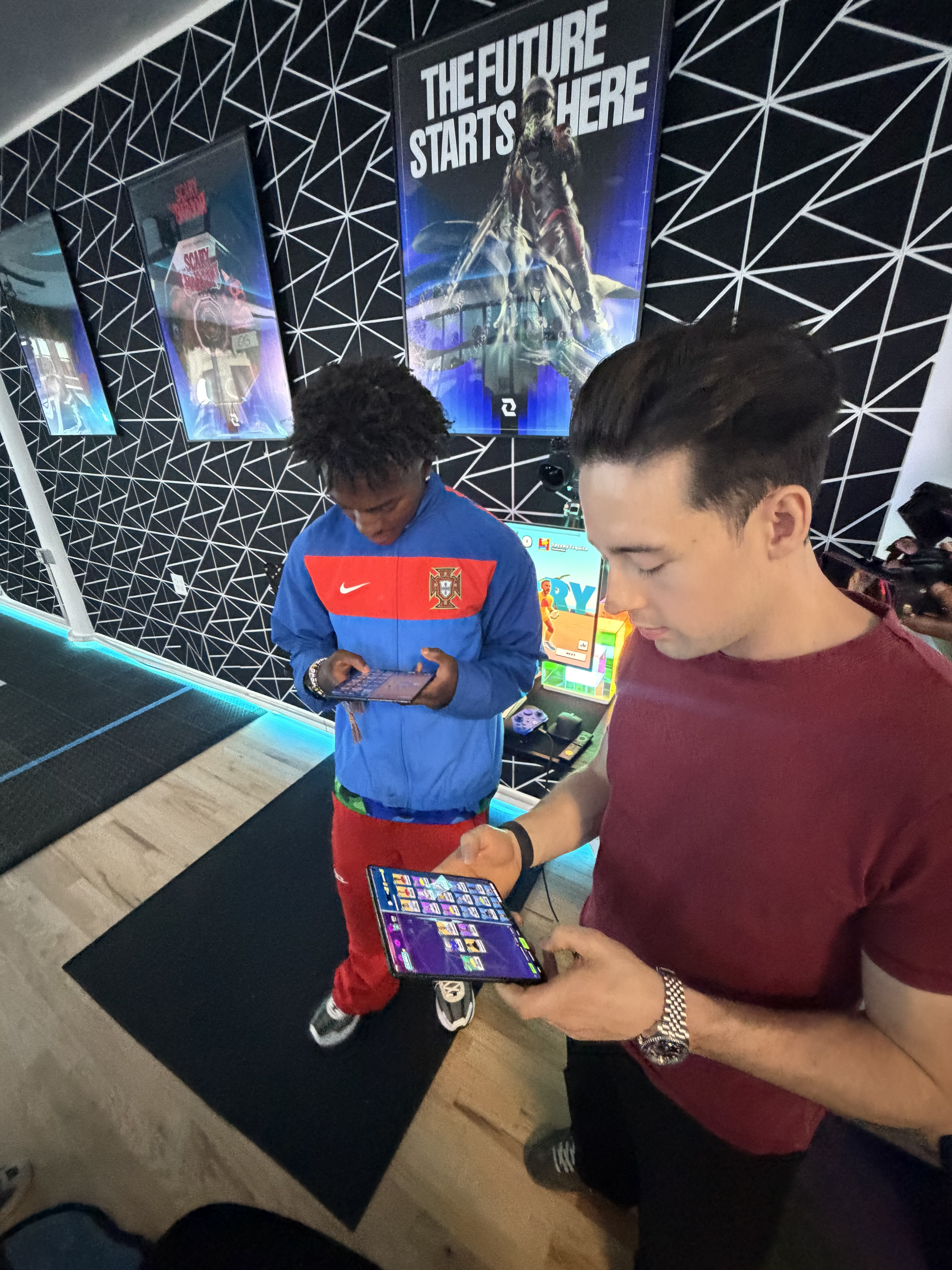
iShowSpeed playing FIFA Heroes at the ENVER offices in NYC

In May 2024, the studio released FormulaX, a Formula 1-themed racing game.

In February 2025, ENVER acquired Scary Baboon, a VR horror-survival game where players play as failed experiments. This has been referred to as an example of 'friendslop'. In response to a community request, the game was updated in May 2026 to allow players to 'fight back' against the monsters in the game. In the same month, it was reported that seven million players had downloaded the game.

In October 2025, FIFA announced the development of FIFA Heroes, created by ENVER for Solace. Coverage noted the studio's previous focus on developing virtual reality games. CEO Kyle Joyce stated that the studio pitched the project to FIFA as a way of combining arcade-style sports nostalgia with live ops.

=== Investment activity ===
In February 2026, following UG, a social-focused reality title released by ContinuumXR, becoming the most popular game on the Meta store, ENVER and Trass Games stated that they had supported the development and marketing of the game. Following this, the companies announced a joint initiative to invest up to $2 million in emerging VR studios developing social first games, alongside providing support on marketing and distribution.

== Games ==
Year	Title	Genre(s)	Platform(s)	Reference
2022	MotoX	Racing	Meta Quest, PC	
2023	Scary Baboon	Horror-survival, Adventure	Meta Quest	
2024	Sharkbait	Hunting	Meta Quest	
2024	FormulaX	Racing	Meta Quest	
2026	FIFA Heroes	Sports	Android, iOS, Nintendo Switch, Nintendo Switch 2, PlayStation 4, PlayStation 5, Xbox One, Xbox Series X/S	
2026	FISHY	Hunting	Meta Quest	
