= List of Africa Cup of Nations official mascots =

There have been several mascots used for events in the Africa Cup of Nations over the years.

== List of mascots ==
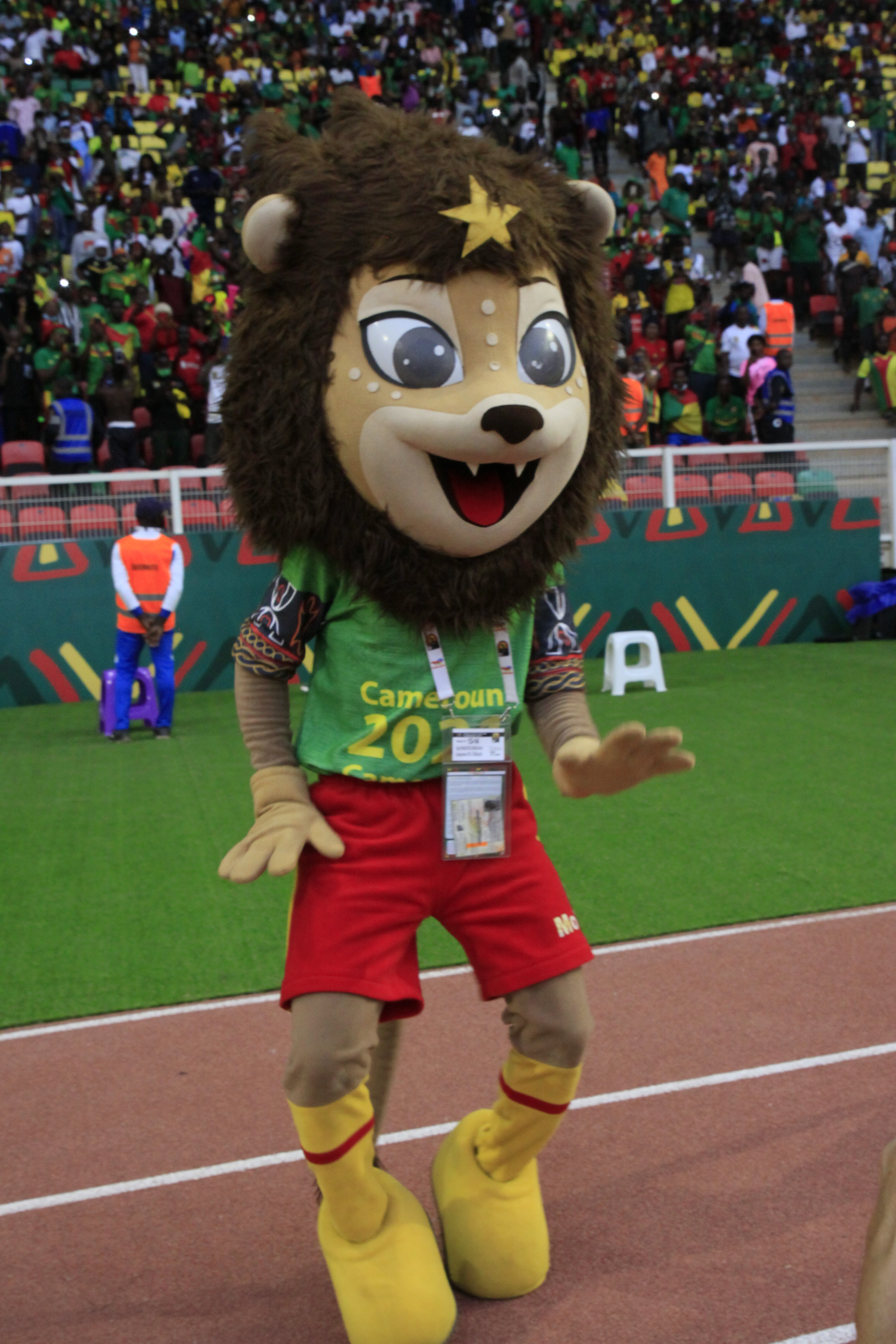
Mola, mascot of the 2021 Africa Cup of Nations.

Event	Mascot name	Description	Refs.
1992	Diambar	A lion	
1994	Eagle of tunisia	An eagle	
1996	Leopard of South Africa	A leopard	
1998	Fofo	A football	
2000	Green Eagles et les Black Stars	An eagle and a star	
2002	Hippopotamus Of Mali	A hippopotamus	
2004	Nçayir	An eagle	
2006	Croconil	A Nile crocodile	
2008	Agro-Hene	A bird of prey	
2010	Palanquinha	A giant sable antelope	
2012	Gaguie	A gorilla	
2013	Takuma	A hippopotamus	
2015	Chuku Chuku	A Hedgehog	
2017	Samba	A black panther	
2019	Tut	A boy	
2021	Mola	A lion	
2023	Akwaba	An elephant	
2025	Assad	An Atlas lion	

== See also ==
- List of FIFA World Cup official mascots
- List of UEFA European Championship official mascots
- List of Copa América official mascots
- List of AFC Asian Cup official mascots
