= List of FIFA World Cup official mascots =

The FIFA World Cup official mascots are a series of characters representing each FIFA World Cup event. The trend began with Willie in the 1966 FIFA World Cup, one of the first mascots to be associated with a major sporting competition. The mascot designs represent a characteristic or symbol of the host country, such as flora, fauna, or costume. The design is frequently one or more anthropomorphic characters targeted at children and coinciding with cartoon shows and merchandise. The FIFA Women's World Cup events have had official mascots since the 1991 event in China.

== Men's World Cup ==
Event	Host country	Mascot name	Description	Refs.
1966	England	Willie	An anthropomorphic lion, the official national animal of the United Kingdom, wearing a Union Jack jersey with the words "WORLD CUP". Designed by freelance children's book illustrator Reg Hoye.	
1970	Mexico	Juanito	A boy wearing Mexico's kit and a sombrero (with the words "MEXICO 70"). His name is the diminutive of "Juan".	
1974	West Germany	Tip and Tap	Two boys wearing Germany's kits, with the letters WM (Weltmeisterschaft, World Cup) and number 74.	
1978	Argentina	Gauchito	A boy wearing Argentina's kit. His hat (with the words ARGENTINA '78), neckerchief and whip are typical of gauchos.	
1982	Spain	Naranjito	An anthropomorphic orange, a typical fruit in Spain, wearing the kit of the host's national team. Its name comes from naranja, Spanish for orange.	
1986	Mexico	Pique	An anthropomorphic jalapeño pepper, characteristic of Mexican cuisine, with a moustache and wearing a sombrero. Its name comes from picante, Spanish for spicy peppers and sauces.	
1990	Italy	Ciao	A stick figure player with a football head and an Italian tricolore body. Its name is an Italian greeting. It is the only World Cup mascot without a face.	
1994	United States	Striker	An anthropomorphic dog, a common U.S. pet animal, wearing a red, white, and blue soccer uniform with the words "USA 94".	
1998	France	Footix	An anthropomorphic cockerel, which is one of the national symbols of France. He has the words "FRANCE 98" on his chest, and his body is mostly blue with a red head and tail, like the host's national team shirt. The mascot for the 2019 Women's World Cup, also hosted by France, is a young female chicken named "Ettie", portrayed as the daughter of Footix.	
2002	South Korea; Japan	Ato, Kaz and Nik	Orange, purple, and blue (respectively) futuristic, computer-generated creatures. Collectively members of a team of "Atmosball" (a fictional football-like sport), Ato is the coach while Kaz and Nik are players. The three individual names were selected from shortlists by users on the Internet and at McDonald's outlets in the host countries.	
2006	Germany	Goleo VI and Pille	An anthropomorphic lion wearing a Germany shirt with the number 06 with a talking football named Pille. Goleo is a portmanteau of the words "goal" and "Leo", the Latin word for lion. In Germany, "Pille" is a colloquial term for a football.	
2010	South Africa	Zakumi	An anthropomorphic leopard, a common animal found in South Africa, with green hair wearing a shirt saying South Africa 2010. Zakumi's green and gold colors represent South African national sports' team's colors. His name comes from "ZA", for South Africa, and "Kumi", a word that means "ten" in various African languages.	
2014	Brazil	Fuleco	An anthropomorphic Brazilian three-banded armadillo wearing a white T-shirt reading "Brasil 2014" and green Bermuda shorts. He has a blue carapace patterned after a football. This brings attention to the country's great biodiversity, as the animal is endemic to Brazil and is classified as a vulnerable species. The name Fuleco is a portmanteau of the words "futebol" ("football") and "ecologia" ("ecology").	
2018	Russia	Zabivaka	An anthropomorphic wolf with a name that translates from Russian as The Goalscorer. Zabivaka wears red shorts and a blue and white T-shirt emblazoned with the words "Russia 2018". The color combination is that of the Russian team, with the mascot being selected via internet voting.	
2022	Qatar	La'eeb	A white floating anthropomorphic ghutrah with eyes, eyebrows and an open mouth. Its name is La’eeb, which is an Arabic word meaning "super-skilled player".	
2026	Canada; Mexico; United States	Maple, Zayu and Clutch	Maple, a red anthropomorphic Canadian moose, whose name is inspired by the maple leaf, represents creativity and resilience. He is a goalkeeper. Zayu, an anthropomorphic Mexican jaguar, wears the traditional green and acts as a forward. Inspired by the importance of the animal to Mexico's ancient civilizations, it symbolizes strength, agility, and cultural pride. Clutch, an anthropomorphic American bald eagle, wears the blue uniform of USMNT and symbolizes courage, leadership, and unity, acting as a midfielder. Also see Merlin the Duck, an unofficial mascot of the 2026 World Cup.	
2030	Spain; Portugal; Morocco; Argentina; Paraguay; Uruguay	TBA	TBA	
2034	Saudi Arabia	TBA	TBA	

== Women's World Cup ==
Event	Host country	Mascot name	Description	Refs.
1991	China	Ling Ling	A bird-like mascot of an unspecified species.	
1995	Sweden	Fiffi	An anthropomorphic Viking helmet painted like the Swedish flag.	
1999	USA	Nutmeg	An anthropomorphic red fox.	
2003	USA	(none)	There was no mascot because of the tournament's sudden moving from China to the US, amidst the 2002–2004 SARS outbreak.	
2007	China	Hua Mulan	A girl based on the Chinese tale of Hua Mulan (from whom she is descended).	
2011	Germany	Karla Kick	An anthropomorphic cat.	
2015	Canada	Shuéme	An anthropomorphic snowy owl; her name derives from chouette, French for "owl".	
2019	France	Ettie	An anthropomorphic chicken; she is the daughter of Footix, the 1998 World Cup mascot.	
2023	Australia; New Zealand	Tazuni	An anthropomorphic little penguin; her name is a portmanteau of the Tasman Sea and 'Unity'.	
2027	Brazil	TBA		

== See also ==
- List of mascots
- List of UEFA European Championship official mascots
- List of Copa América official mascots
- List of Africa Cup of Nations official mascots
- List of AFC Asian Cup official mascots
