= Merlín the Duck =

Mexican duck seen during the 2026 FIFA World Cup

Pato Merlín
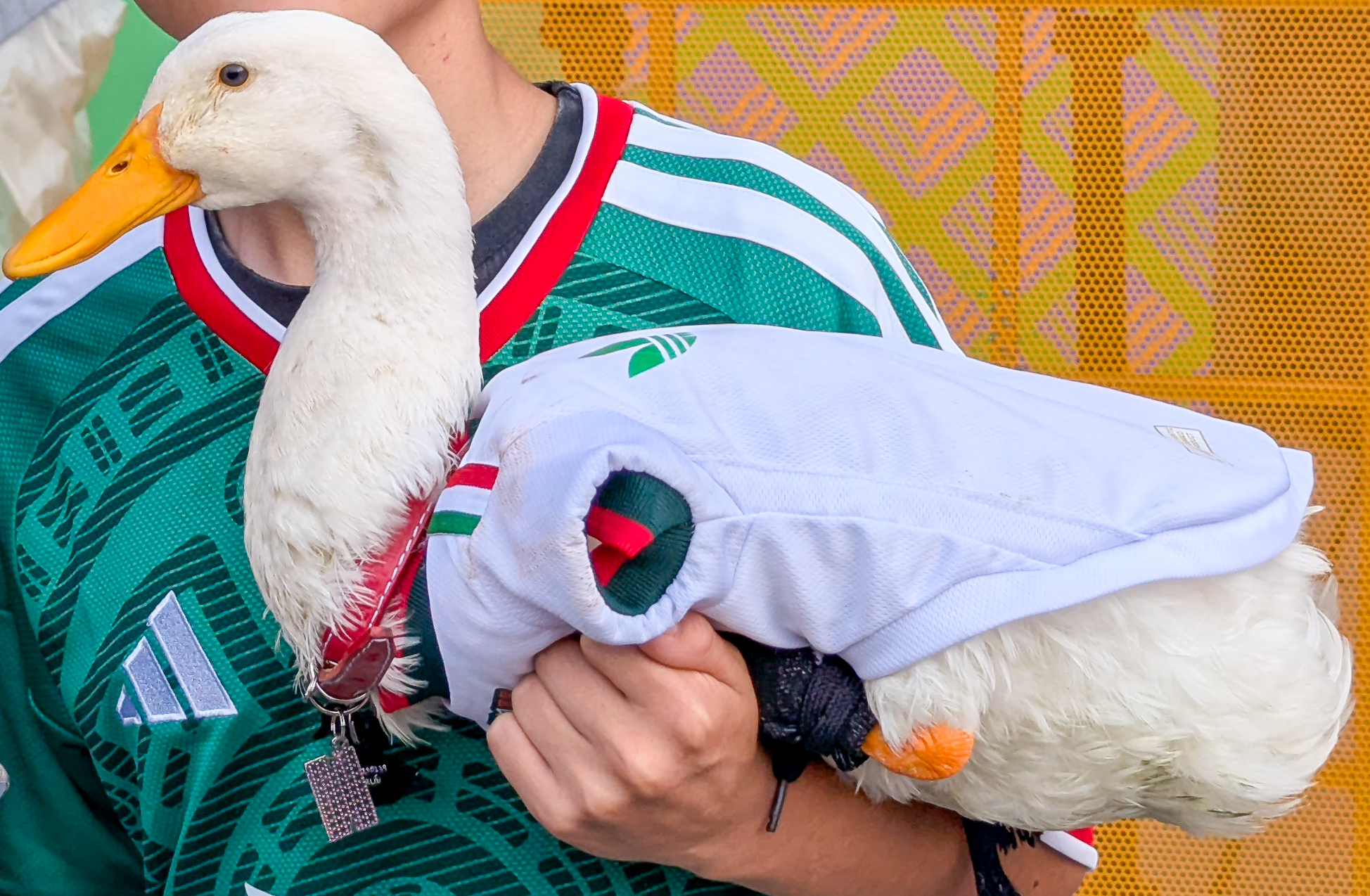
- Other name: Merlin the Duck
- Species: Anas platyrhynchos domesticus
- Sex: Male
- Born: c. 2024 (c. 1–2)
- Owner: Familia Gómez

Pato Merlín, also known as Merlín the Duck (c. 2024), is a duck in Mexico that became a pop-culture celebrity during the 2026 FIFA World Cup.

Although it became a viral phenomenon, its notoriety raised concerns of animal abuse, due to its objectification and the result of a Nemo effect by other people who acquired a similar bird in order to replicate its status of fame, without understanding its care or needs.

== History ==
Karla and Cristián Gómez own a soft drink and water stand in Mexico City. On 8 March 2024, a customer visited the stall carrying a small duck, which was given to Cristián. The duck was named Merlín after the famous wizard.

The duck began regularly accompanying the family and mother, Karla Gómez, to the drink stand. In mid-June 2026 the duck was spotted wearing a Mexico national football team jersey, following the Mexican team's victory over South Africa in the 2026 FIFA World Cup.

The image went viral, even overshadowing the official World Cup mascots such as Zayu the Mexican jaguar. Its fame grew to such an extent that FIFA representatives met with its owner for an advertisement photo shoot. Merlín even had an audience with Mexican president Claudia Sheinbaum. The latter meeting drew harsh criticism and social rejection for both the animal's caretakers and the president. Initially, Karla, the duck's owner, stated she would not attend, requesting instead that the space be given to groups of searching mothers, a promise she did not keep. Sheinbaum, in turn, was criticized for the invitation due to its questionable relevance, which detracted from the time and importance of truly pressing national issues.

== See also ==
- List of individual birds
- Swimbappé (fish) - another animal that gained notability related to the 2026 FIFA World Cup
