= Maple, Zayu and Clutch =

Mascots for the 2026 FIFA World Cup

- From left to right: Maple, Zayu, and Clutch
- First appearance: 2026 FIFA World Cup
- Created by: FIFA

In-universe information
- Species: Moose (Maple); Jaguar (Zayu); Bald eagle (Clutch)
- Gender: Male (all)
- Nationality: Canadian (Maple); Mexican (Zayu); American (Clutch)

Maple, Zayu, and Clutch were the official mascots of the 2026 FIFA World Cup held in the United States, Mexico, and Canada. On September 25, 2025, the anthropomorphic moose, jaguar and bald eagle characters were announced.

== Description ==
Maple, an anthropomorphic Canadian moose, appears in red and represents creativity and resilience. He is a goalkeeper and draws inspiration from the maple leaf, Canada's national symbol.

Zayu [ˈsa.ju], an anthropomorphic Mexican jaguar, wears the traditional green and acts as a forward. Inspired by the importance of the animal to ancient civilizations of Mexico, it symbolizes strength, agility, and cultural pride.

Clutch, an anthropomorphic American bald eagle, wears the blue uniform of the American team and symbolizes courage, leadership, and unity, acting as a midfielder; his name references the concept of clutch, the ability to excel under pressure.

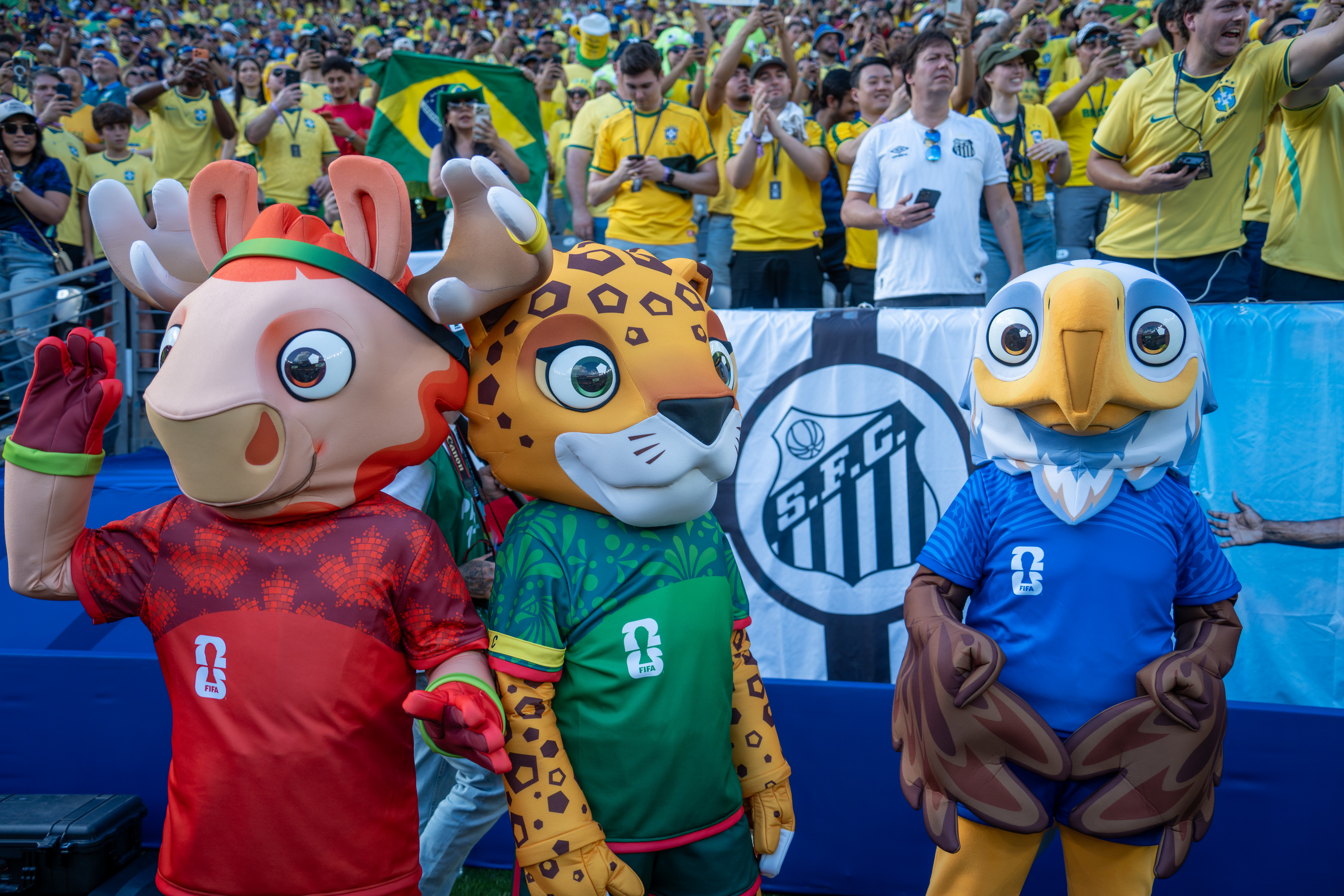
Maple, Zayu and Clutch at the 2026 FIFA World Cup in New Jersey.

== Appearance in media ==
Maple, Zayu and Clutch were featured as playable characters in the FIFA Heroes video game, with each mascot having its own special ability. Players were able to field the mascots alongside international football players from the 2026 FIFA World Cup.

== See also ==
- List of FIFA World Cup official mascots
- Merlin the Duck

Preceded by La'eeb	FIFA World Cup mascot Maple, Zayu and Clutch; FIFA 2026	Succeeded by Upcoming
