= FIFA Heroes =

Official FIFA video game

- App icon
- Developer: ENVER
- Publisher: Solace Games
- Series: FIFA
- Platforms: Android; iOS; Windows; Nintendo Switch; Nintendo Switch 2; PlayStation 4; PlayStation 5; Xbox One; Xbox Series X/S
- Release: Mobile, PC: WW: June 24, 2026; Console: WW: 2026
- Genre: Sports

FIFA Heroes is an arcade-style video game developed by ENVER Studio in partnership with FIFA.

It is FIFA's first licensed game announced since its agreement with EA Sports came to a close in 2022.

== Gameplay ==
FIFA Heroes is a five-a-side arcade-style football game in which players field teams composed of international football personalities, recognisable fictional characters, and FIFA’s official mascots, including mascots created for the 2026 FIFA World Cup. Unlike the EA Sports FIFA series and other traditional football simulators, the game is designed around a fast-paced, exaggerated arcade-style format. Players can assemble squads and compete in either single-player PvE modes or multiplayer matches against other players.

Mascots and characters each possess unique super abilities and special moves, and matches feature dynamic physics and pitch-altering power attacks. According to FIFA, players are able to take part in quick arcade matches and structured PvE challenges to progress their club through career-style milestones within the five-a-side format.

=== Characters ===
The game feature current FIFA World Cup players including Jude Bellingham, Harry Kane and Emiliano Martínez, historical legends such as Diego Maradona, and a selection of mythological icons including Thor and Sun Wukong appearing alongside the official mascots of the FIFA World Cup 2026.

In June 2026, to mark the release of the game, FIFA Heroes announced that iShowSpeed would be a playable character in the game, as well as featuring on the cover, alongside Central Cee and Enzo Fernández.

=== Progression and monetization ===
Progression in the mobile version is based on recurring challenges and randomized rewards known as lockers, which contain new heroes or shards used to upgrade existing heroes. The game uses coins and gems as in-game currencies; gems can be purchased through microtransactions, while players can also earn rewards by completing matches, challenges and watching optional advertisements. Lockers are divided into several tiers, with higher-tier lockers offering increased chances of rarer heroes.

== Development ==
=== FIFA partnership ===
In October 2022, FIFA confirmed that it would no longer grant an exclusive licence to EA Sports for the use of the FIFA name after the two failed to reach an agreement over licensing fees. Instead, FIFA announced its plans to create a "new gaming model", and "work with a range of third-party studios and publishers" to develop a range of games.

In October 2025, FIFA announced the release of FIFA Heroes, the first new title released, produced in partnership with Solace and developed by New York studio, ENVER.

=== Motorola ===
In March 2026, Motorola announced that most new devices would come with the game pre-downloaded, with custom gameplay designed for the latest Razr fold as well as exclusive rewards for Motorola users including currency, emotes and players.

=== Gameplay development ===
FIFA Heroes was developed as arcade-focused alternative to traditional football simulations, with an emphasis on accessibility and multiplayer play. Game director Andy Tudor stated that the game includes modes such as squad-based play, where users control individual positions on the pitch, alongside private matches, and a 1v1 mode. The gameplay also incorporates elements from multiplayer online battle arena (MOBA) games, including positional awareness systems, cooldown-based abilities, and team composition mechanics.

According to ENVER CEO Kyle Joyce, the project was conceived to appeal to younger audiences who are less engaged with simulation-style football titles. Drawing inspiration from arcade-style sports games such as FIFA Street and NBA Street, the developers aimed to revive the genre through a live-service model influenced by games like Fortnite.

== Release ==
FIFA Heroes was initially announced to be released on April 28, 2026, but was delayed. It was released on June 24, 2026.
