= List of AFC Asian Cup official mascots =

The AFC Asian Cup began to use mascots for the first time in 2000 when Nour, a sparrow, was used for the 2000 AFC Asian Cup in Lebanon. Before 2000, the tournament did not feature mascots due to differences in regions and cultures affecting on the decision of several host nations in the continent, as well as a lack of interest. Since then, with the exception of 2007 edition, every Asian Cup has featured one or more mascots for the tournament. The mascot for the Asian Cup is also very diverse, based on cultural heritage of the host country.

== List of mascots ==
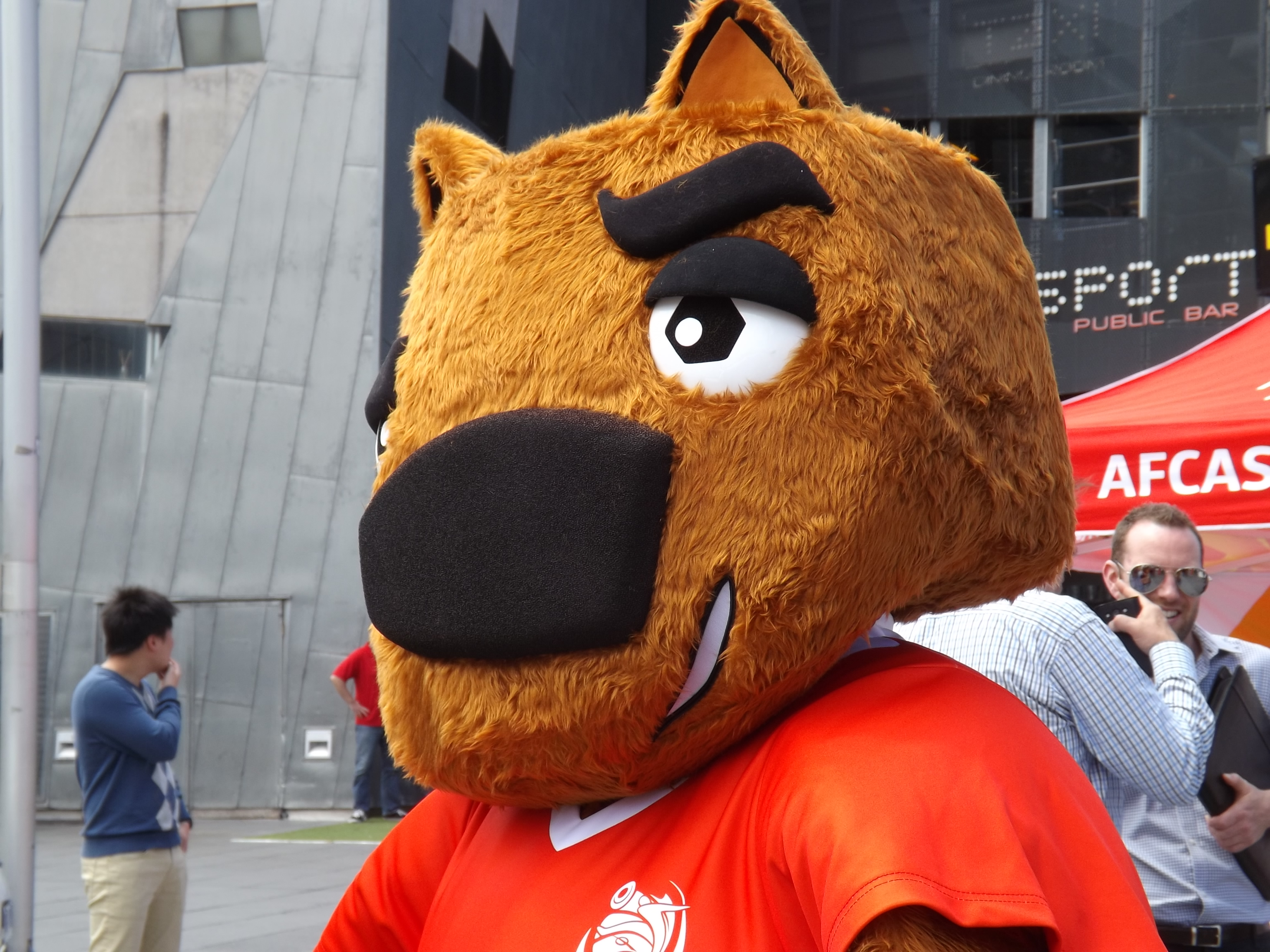
Nutmeg, the mascot of the 2015 AFC Asian Cup

AFC Asian Cup	Name	Description	Refs.
Lebanon 2000	Nour	Nour was a sparrow bringing the song of peace and development, as well as harmony and fair play, reflecting the situation of Lebanon at the time. The country was devastated by the Lebanese Civil War and the tournament was considered as a symbol for the beauty prevailing after those times of peril.	
China 2004	Bei Bei	Bei Bei, a Chinese monkey, was fun-loving, friendly and colorful, yet brilliant in playing football. He is a proud symbol of Chinese culture and of the year 2004, which was the Year of the Monkey in China.	
Qatar 2011	Saboog, Tmbki, Freha, Zkriti and Traeneh	They were a family of five jerboas, a rodent found in the deserts of Qatar. Saboog is named after the term used to refer to a jerboa in Qatar. while the other four characters are named after different locations in the north, south, east and west of Qatar.	
Australia 2015	Nutmeg	Also known as "Nutmeg the Wombat", he was a wombat native to the host nation Australia. He wore the colours of the 2015 AFC Asian Cup, red and yellow. He was named after a skill in football where a player dribbles the ball through an opponent's legs, known as a nutmeg.	
United Arab Emirates 2019	Mansour and Jarrah	Mansour is a child who has lightning speed and ability to score, while Jarrah is an Arabian falcon, a symbol of the host nation.	
Qatar 2023	Saboog, Tmbki, Freha, Zkriti and Traeneh	The same mascots from the 2011 edition with anime-inspired redesigns.	

== See also ==
- List of FIFA World Cup official mascots
- List of UEFA European Championship official mascots
- List of Copa América official mascots
- List of Africa Cup of Nations official mascots
