= Pibe (mascot) =

2021 Copa America mascot

Pibe was the official mascot of the 2021 Copa América held in Brazil, making it the 14th officially selected mascot in Copa América history.

It was officially unveiled on 1 December 2019, two days before the final draw. The symbol was described as a funny, cheerful, agile and unique mascot with which the organization of the competition described the dog that would represent the Copa América. “This is the maximum specimen of the New South American Race. His name was revealed on 3 December, during the Copa América draw. The symbol was selected as the mascot ahead of Pipe based on the votes of internet users. It was revealed that the tournament organisers of the Copa América had arranged an online voting through its official Twitter handle to decide the selection of the mascot on 2 December 2019.

== Description ==
Pibe is a brown dog with a white spot on the right eye. It is also a cheerful little dog, with a long tongue, large ears and a tender look, with a white spot standing out on the left side of his muzzle, on his light coat. Designers claim that the pet has the best traits of each South American dog breed.
