= La'eeb =

Mascot for the 2022 FIFA World Cup

- Official artwork
- First appearance: 2022 FIFA World Cup
- Created by: Fractal Picture
- Based on: Keffiyeh

In-universe information
- Gender: Male
- Nationality: Qatari

La'eeb (Arabic: لعيب, romanized: Laʿīb) was the official mascot of the 2022 FIFA World Cup, which was held in Qatar. The name means "super-skilled player" in Arabic, and is a representation of the popular men's headdress keffiyeh, used in many parts of the Arab world. He was designed by Indian firm Fractal Picture, and animated by Qatari firm Katara Studios.

== Creation and design ==
La'eeb is an anthropomorphic keffiyeh that floats and has eyes, lips, and an open mouth, and is presented as a joyful, altruistic character. Khalid Ali Al Mawlawi, Deputy Director General, Marketing, Communications and Tournament Experience, described the character as "fun" and "playful," hoping that he would appeal to young and old spectators. La'eeb is presented as adventurous, curious, and encouraging everyone to believe in themselves.

La'eeb was revealed to the public through a short film produced by Fractal Picture and co-created by Katara Studios, "A Visit from Mascot Verse". He was named the first 'digitised' mascot, from the 'mascot verse', "a place that is indescribable. We encourage everyone to imagine what it looks like" - which is open to interpretation.

A water screen projection film created by Fractal Picture in collaboration with La'eeb was exhibited on the corniche of Qatar. Additionally, they produced a 3D LED digital billboard film that was displayed in Lusail.

== Public reception ==
La'eeb faced criticism for its ghost-like appearance, which some linked to the deaths of guest workers on World Cup construction sites. While some fans appreciated the mascot's reference to regional culture, others argued that it lacked a connection to football.

Twitter users were particularly vocal in their opinions of La'eeb, with many likening the mascot to a ghost or jinn, and some even referring to it as a "tissue paper" figure. Despite the criticism, there were also those who defended La'eeb's design and praised its cultural significance.

== See also ==
- List of FIFA World Cup official mascots

Preceded by Zabivaka	FIFA World Cup mascot La'eeb; FIFA 2022	Succeeded by Maple, Zayu and Clutch
