= Zabivaka =

Mascot for the 2018 FIFA World Cup

- Official artwork
- First appearance: 2018 FIFA World Cup
- Created by: Ekaterina Bocharova
- Portrayed by: Rafe Young

In-universe information
- Species: Eurasian wolf
- Nationality: Russian

Zabivaka (Russian: Забива́ка) was the official mascot of the 2018 FIFA World Cup, which was held in Russia. The name is a blend of the Russian words забивать (zabivat', "to strike") and собака (sobaka, "dog").

Designed by student designer Ekaterina Bocharova, aged 22, the mascot was selected by internet voting in Russia, beating out a tiger and a cat.

In pre-World Cup events, the mascot was played by English YouTuber and actor Rafe Young.

== Design ==
The mascot was unveiled on 21 October 2016. It represents an anthropomorphic Eurasian wolf (Canis lupus lupus) with brown and white fur, wearing a T-shirt emblazoned with the words "RUSSIA 2018" and orange goggles — according to the designer, these are not ski goggles, but sports goggles like those used in cycling: "Zabivaka is so fast on the field that he needs eye protection".

The combination of white, blue and red T-shirt and shorts are the national colours of the Russian team.

== Competition ==
The competition results were announced on 22 October 2016, in the Evening Urgant on the Channel One Russia. The Wolf, named Zabivaka, scored 53% of the votes, ahead of the Tiger (27%) and the Cat (20%). More than one million people participated in the voting, which took place during September 2016 at FIFA.com, as well as before an during the live show of the Evening Urgant, where the results of the competition were announced.

The name was suggested at the show by the chairman of the World Cup 2018 Organising Committee Vitali Mutko. FIFA paid Bocharova $500.

== Gallery ==
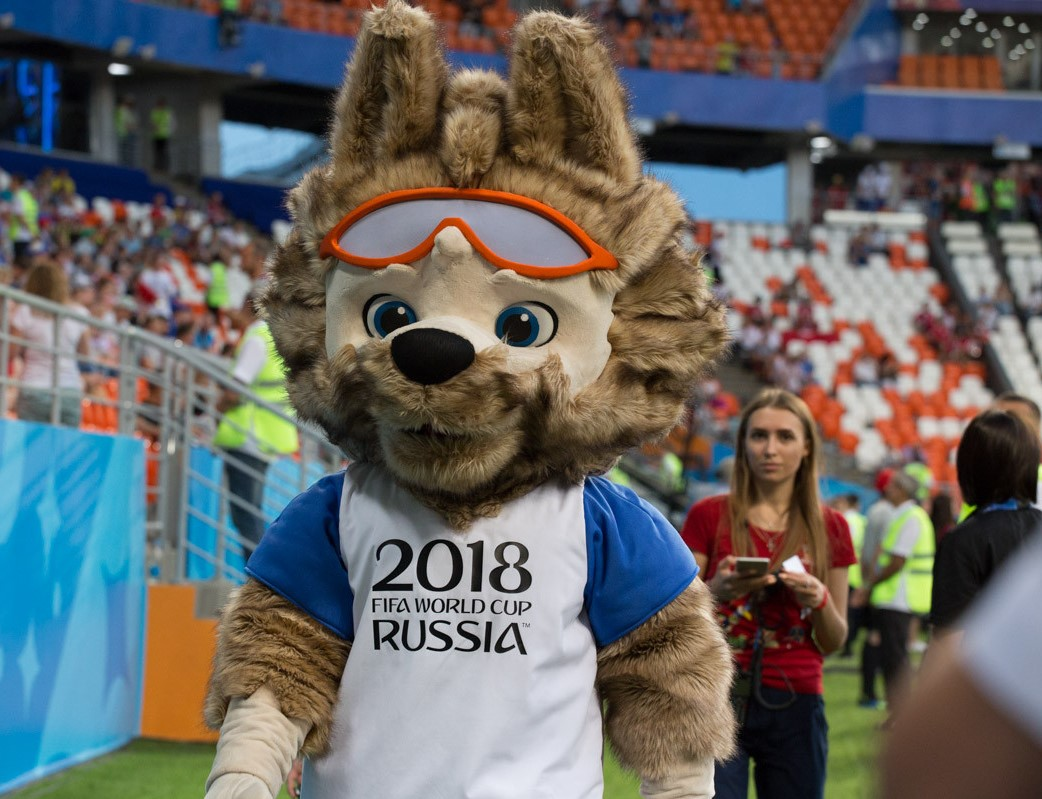
Zabivaka mascot during 2018 FIFA World Cup match between Panama and Tunisia.

Zabivaka pictures on a russian set of postage stamps.

== See also ==
- FIFA World Cup mascots
- 2014 Winter Olympic and Paralympic Games mascots
- Zoich
- Misha
- Vučko
- 2018 World Cup
- FIFA World Cup

Preceded by Fuleco	FIFA World Cup mascot Zabivaka; FIFA 2018	Succeeded by La’eeb
