= Guaky =

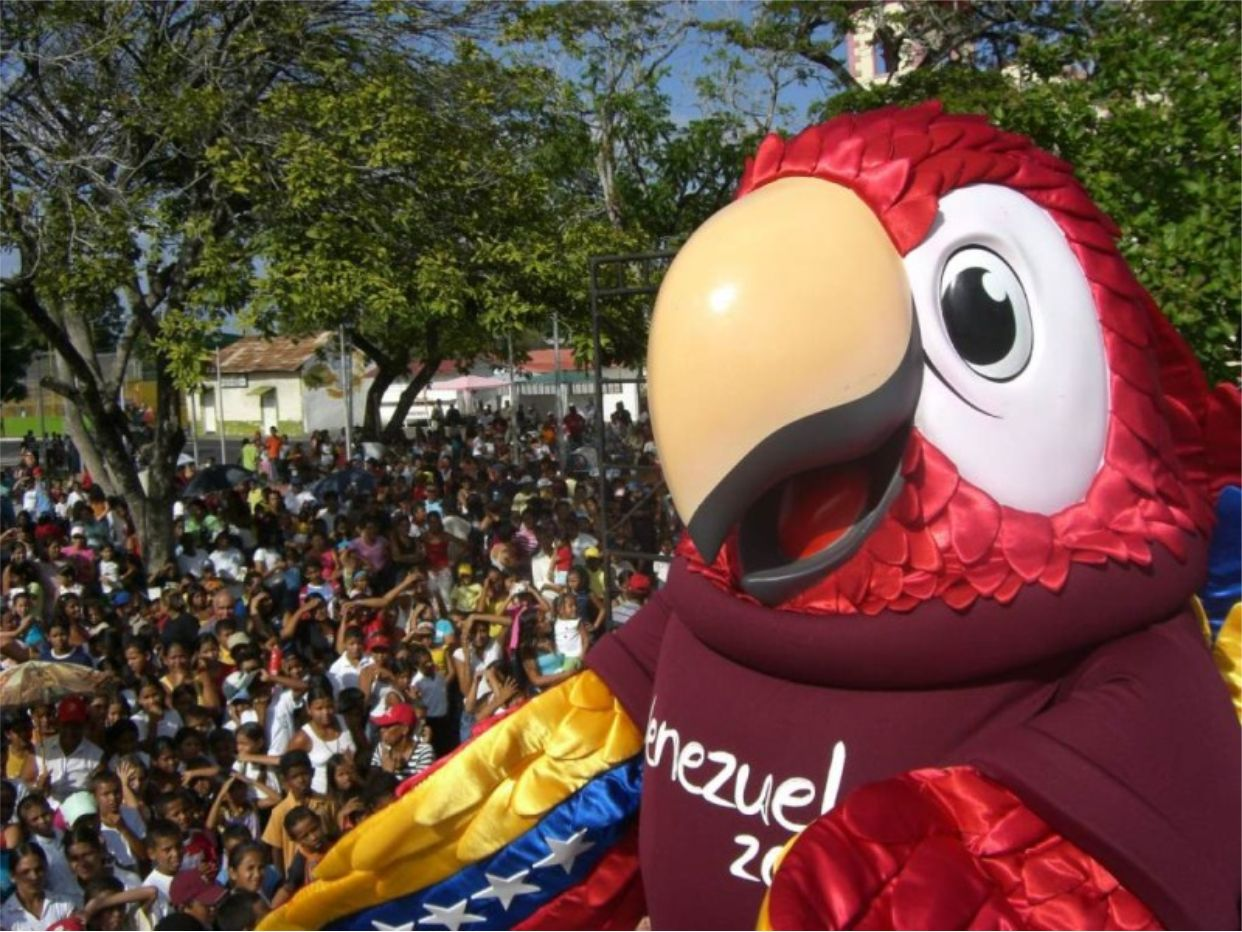
Guaky on his tour of Venezuela.

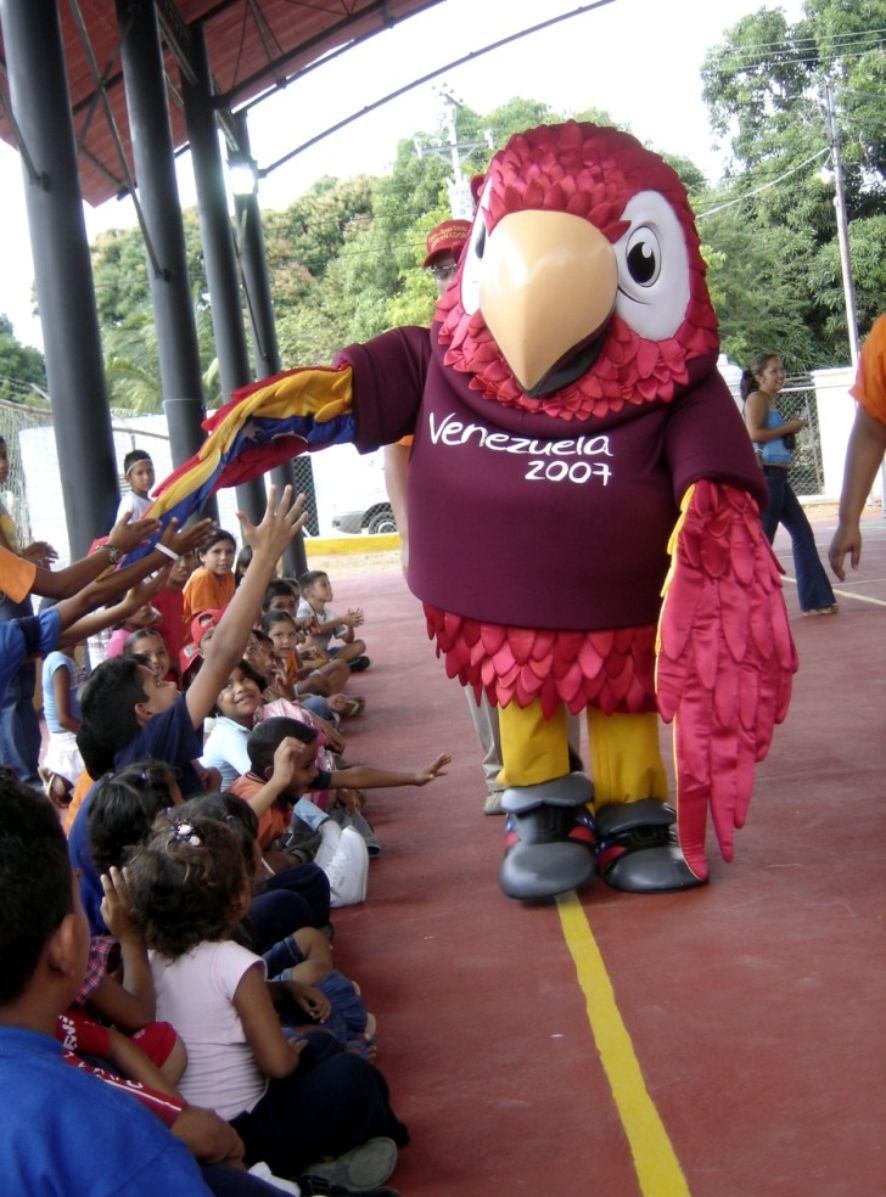
Guaky through the main cities of Venezuela.

Guaky was the official mascot of the 2007 Copa América in Venezuela. The bird wore the Venezuela national football team's burgundy shirt and had "Venezuela 2007" printed on its chest. It was also accompanied by a football.

== Description ==
Guaky is a scarlet macaw, a bird representative of Venezuela. He wears the burgundy traditional jersey of the Venezuela national football team and football boots. Under his wings is the characteristic tricolor national flag, with its eight stars on his wings.

To choose the official mascot, a contest was held, which was entered by 4.5 million Venezuelan children. The winning entry came from 15-year-old Jhoyling Zabaleta. The final design was commissioned by Fractal Studio, who gave it a "strong, cheerful and sporting personality". The name of the mascot, "Guaky", was the winning poll of an online survey with 54.17% of the votes.

The newspaper El Universal said "Guaky has been instrumental in promoting the tournament and gave his joy to several states."

Guaky was seen in shopping malls, events related to the tournament, caravans, in the National Assembly and other public places. To enable its presence in several places at the same time, the National Organizing Committee of the 2007 Copa América requested the creation of 10 high-quality suits.
