= List of UEFA European Championship official mascots =

The UEFA European Football Championship for men has featured mascots since 1980. The first mascot was Pinocchio, for the UEFA Euro 1980 in Italy. Since then, every tournament has had a single mascot except for the UEFA Euro 2008 and UEFA Euro 2012, which both had two. The mascots are mostly targeted at children, with cartoon shows and other merchandise released to coincide with the competition.

UEFA Women's Euro 2017 in the Netherlands was the first women's tournament to have a mascot.

== List of mascots ==
=== Men's Tournament ===
For the Men's Tournament, there have been mascots in each event since 1980.

Event	Mascot name	Description	Refs.
Italy 1980	Pinocchio	Based on the character from the children's story of the same name, created by Italian author Carlo Collodi. Pinocchio is a small wooden boy with a long nose in the colours of the Italy national flag and a white hat emblazoned with EUROPA 80.	
France 1984	Péno	A white cockerel, a traditional national symbol of France, wearing football boots and white gloves. Péno is a French slang for penalty kick.	
West Germany 1988	Berni	An anthropomorphic, cartoon Flemish Giant rabbit wearing a football kit in the colours of the Germany national flag: a black shirt with UEFA across the front, red shorts and yellow socks, and white headband and wristbands. Berni was mostly depicted jumping and dribbling a football. The mascot's name derived from Bern, the city where Germany won its first international title, the 1954 FIFA World Cup.	
Sweden 1992	Rabbit	The 1992 mascot was simply a new version of Berni, this time in the Swedish national colours.	
England 1996	Goaliath	Goaliath was designed in a similar fashion to the original mascot of the 1966 World Cup called World Cup Willie. Goaliath is a lion dressed in an England kit and football boots whilst holding a football under his right arm.	
Netherlands/Belgium 2000	Benelucky	A lion with a devil's tail and human hands. A lion's head appears on the crest of the Royal Dutch Football Association, and the Belgium national football team is historically nicknamed the "Red Devils". The name Benelucky is a portmanteau of "Benelux", the term for the three nations of Belgium, the Netherlands and Luxembourg, and the ending "-lucky" wishing the participating teams good luck.	
Portugal 2004	Kinas	A cartoon version of a boy dressed in the Portugal football strip. The mascot's name, Kinas, is taken from "Bandeira das Quinas", which is a name for the Portugal national flag.	
Austria/Switzerland 2008	Trix and Flix	A twin set of mascots to represent the two host countries, Austria and Switzerland. The Rainbow Productions and Warner Bros. design was of two children dressed in red and white football strips. These are the colours of the national flags of Austria and Switzerland.	
Poland/Ukraine 2012	Slavek and Slavko	Once again, Rainbow Productions and Warner Bros. created the mascots. The twins represent the two host nations, Poland and Ukraine. One wears the Poland national colours of white and red, the other wears the yellow and blue of Ukraine.	
France 2016	Super Victor	A child in the kit of the France national football team, with a red cape at the back to echo the flag of France. Other names considered were Dribblou and Goalix. The cape, boots and ball are claimed to be the child's superpowers.	
Euro 2020	Skillzy	A character inspired by freestyle football, street football and panna culture.	
Germany 2024	Albärt	The mascot is based on a teddy bear. Following a vote from website users and children across Europe, Albärt was chosen as the mascot's name.	
UK & Ireland 2028			

=== Women's Tournament ===
Each of the Women's Tournaments since 2017 have had mascots.

Event	Mascot name	Description	Refs.
Netherlands 2017	Kicky	Kicky is an orange-coloured cat-like lion mascot.	
England 2022	Hat Trick	The Hat Trick are a trio of girl-like robots named Kai, Ashley, and Robyn.	
Switzerland 2025	Maddli	Maddli is a St, Bernard puppy.	
Germany 2029	TBA	TBA	

== See also ==
- List of FIFA World Cup official mascots
- List of Copa América official mascots
- List of Africa Cup of Nations official mascots
- List of AFC Asian Cup official mascots
