= Ian Rosenblatt =

British lawyer

Ian Isaac Rosenblatt OBE (born 2 November 1959) is a British lawyer, former senior partner of the now defunct business and litigation law firm group Rosenblatt Group plc, and a supporter of charitable causes, notably in the field of classical music.

== Early life and family ==
Rosenblatt was born in Liverpool to a businessman father and academic mother – sister of the well-known actors Clive Swift and David Swift – and was educated at Liverpool College and the London School of Economics and Political Science, where he studied Law. He is a member of The Law Society.

Rosenblatt has three grown-up children from his marriage to his late wife, Heather. In 2007 he married Emma Kane, Joint Chief Executive of International communications agency Porta Communications plc.

== Career ==
On leaving university Ian Rosenblatt became an articled clerk at law firm Collyer Bristow, qualifying in 1983, and then joined media law firm Sheridans, where he became a partner in 1985. In 1989 he founded his own law firm in the City of London, Rosenblatt Solicitors, which has grown to over 100 staff handling business law in the UK and internationally.

Rosenblatt Group plc floated on the London Stock Market on 8 May 2018.

In August 2023, Rosenblatt Group became embroiled in a dispute with ex-Rosenblatt Group CEO Nicola Foulston. Rosenblatt was not on the board and not an employee at the time.

In 2000, Rosenblatt co-founded the London-based corporate and financial communications agency Redleaf Polhill; its chief executive is his wife, Emma Kane. The agency was sold to Porta Communications plc in 2014. Kane was appointed Joint Chief Executive of Porta Communications plc, which is listed on the London Stock Exchange, in April 2018.

== Music ==
Rosenblatt established Rosenblatt Recitals in 1999, a series of opera recitals based in London. The first series launched in 2000. The Rosenblatt Recital Series ceased in 2017.

In 2013, Rosenblatt became the owner of the Les Aldrich Music Shop, an independent retailer in Muswell Hill, North London.

Rosenblatt was appointed Officer of the Order of the British Empire (OBE) in the 2016 Birthday Honours for philanthropic services to music.

== Other charitable activities ==
Rosenblatt was a donor to the Labour Party under Ed Miliband's leadership.

In June 2023, The Daily Telegraph accused Rosenblatt Group of working on behalf of a sanctioned Russian bank, VTB Capital. As a result, the Labour Party were initially set to return a donation from Rosenblatt. Rosenblatt Group was later revealed to have been acting for the administrators under a UK Government licence with fees paid by the Bank of England. After an investigation, the Labour Party confirmed there had been no wrongdoing and stated it would not be returning the donation.
