= Simon Hang-bock Rhee =

South Korean scout (born 1954)

- Born: October 28, 1954 (age 71)

Korean name
- Hangul: 이항복
- RR: I Hangbok
- MR: I Hangbok

Simon Hang-bock Rhee (Korean: 이항복; born October 28, 1954) is a South Korean former chairman of the World Scout Committee, the main executive body of the World Organization of the Scout Movement, and Chairman of its Management Subcommittee. He was first elected as a member and vice-chairman of the Committee in Seoul, Korea in 2008, and elected as chairman at the 39th World Scout Conference in Brazil in 2011 for a three-year term.

== Background ==
A 1972 recipient of the Tiger Scout award, Rhee is the founding Chairman of the Association of Top Achiever Scouts (ATAS), a fellowship group formed during the 38th World Scout Conference, of Scouts and Scouters who have achieved the highest rank in their Scout associations-Queen Scout, President's Scout, Fuji Scout, Eagle Scout, etc.

Rhee has been active in the Scout Movement since 1966. He was a Scout and Venture Scout and has remained active in Scouting, holding various positions in the Korea Scout Association (KSA) and APR Sub-Committees. He is currently president of the Asia-Pacific Regional Scout Foundation, vice president of the Korea Scout Association and was chairman of the 38th World Scout Conference and 10th World Scout Youth Forum Host Committee.

Rhee holds a Bachelor of Science, Master of Engineering, Doctorate of Construction Management at Chung-Ang University, Korea. He is a professional architectural engineer and a construction management specialist. His occupation titles include senior director at Hanmi Global Co., Ltd., concurrent professor at Chung-Ang University in Seoul, Korea. He was project manager for Hanjin Heavy Industries (formerly Korea Shipbuilding and Engineering Corporation) in Korea and Hong Kong (1976–1990), general manager of Architectural Marketing Team and project manager for various international construction sites including the Pebble Bay Condominium and Pulau Seraya Power Station in Singapore, as well as the Incheon International Airport for Samsung C&T Corporation (1990–2008). He is presently vice president of Construction Management Marketing Department at Hanmi Parsons Corporation. Rhee currently resides in Seoul, Korea, is married, and has two daughters.

World Organization of the Scout Movement
| Preceded by Rick Cronk | Chairman, World Scout Committee; 2011–2014 | Succeeded by João Armando Gonçalves |
