= President's Scout =

The President's Scout or President's Award may refer to several ranks in Scout organizations around the world:

- the highest rank of Bangladesh Scouts
- the highest rank of The Scout Association of Maldives
- the highest rank of the Sri Lanka Scout Association
- the highest rank of the Tanzania Scouts Association
- the President's Award, the highest rank of the Kiribati Scout Association
- President's Scout (Singapore Scout Association), the highest rank in the Singapore Scout Association
- Rashtrapati Scout, the highest rank of The Bharat Scouts and Guides
