= Ranks in the Scout Association of Japan =

The advancement program for the Scout Association of Japan (ボーイスカウト日本連盟の進歩制度, Bōi Sukauto Nippon Renmei no shinpo seido) is symbolized by the earning of several rank badges.

== Rank insignia ==
=== Beaver and Cub Scouts ===
Cub Scout rank insignia

Squirrel, Rabbit, Deer, Bear

Beaver Scouting is the youngest section of Scouting with members younger than Cub Scouts, aged five to eight. The program is based on the Scouts Canada concept of co-operating and sharing. Members normally wear a brown vest as a uniform with a blue Beaver cap. The program is based around a specially written story called Friends of the Forest. Badges are elongate light blue ovals with turquoise or vermilion borders, based on their Canadian counterparts.

All Cub Scouts first work on their Squirrel badge to complete the Cub Scout joining requirements, which include knowing the Cub Scout motto and salute. The Squirrel badge is dark blue ringed in gold, with a button loop. Once the Squirrel badge requirements have been completed, the Cub Scout will continue with the age appropriate program. The next three ranks are diamond-shaped red badges based upon the Boy Scouts of America Cub system from the 1940s through 1972. Rabbit Cub Scouts (second grade) work toward the Rabbit badge. Deer Cub Scouts (third grade) work toward the Deer badge. Initially, Bear work toward the Bear Badge. After earning the Bear badge, Scouts work toward earning activity badges. Finally, Bear Cub Scouts work toward the Arrow of Light. The Arrow of Light award is the highest award available to Cub Scouts. It requires the Scout to have earned the Bear Scout badge and eight activity badges. In addition to the skill and activity requirements of the preceding ranks, the Arrow of Light requires Scouts to learn the Scout Promise and Scout Law, in preparation for advancing to the Scout level. Earning the Arrow of Light will help earn many of the requirements for the lower ranks of the Scout level. Cub Scouts wear the badge above the left pocket.

The ranks are:

- Squirrel (Risu)
- Rabbit (Usagi)
- Deer (Shika)
- Bear (Kuma)
- Arrow of Light

=== Scouts ===
Scout rank insignia

Scout, Tenderfoot, Second Class, First Class, Chrysanthemum

The rank program uses a series of medals and patches as emblems. The left-pocket badge oval shape and coloration is based on the rank badges used by the Boy Scouts of America between 1972 and 1990. The badge for the Apprentice or Scout rank consists of a simple fleur-de-lis, which symbolizes a compass needle. The needle points the Scout in the right direction, onward and upward. This is the only badge to have a button loop, to emphasize its temporary status and that a Scout should soon move on to Tenderfoot. The next two ranks show the rank highlighted with the rest of the emblem subdued into the background. The Tenderfoot badge takes the fleur-de-lis of the Scout badge and incorporates the sacred mirror Yata no Kagami, which represents wisdom and honesty. The stars symbolize truth and knowledge. The Second Class badge features a scroll inscribed with the Scout Motto, with the ends turned up and a knotted rope hanging from the bottom. The knot reminds each Scout to remember the Scout slogan, Do a Good Turn Daily, and the upturned ends of the scroll symbolize cheerfulness in service. The First Class badge combines the elements of the Tenderfoot and Second Class badges. The First Class badge is essentially the same as the emblem of the SAJ. Chrysanthemum has a First Class symbol on a stylized white chrysanthemum, the symbol of the Japanese Royal Family. Fuji Scout was originally the ultimate rank at the Scout level, and thus of Japanese Scouting itself, prior to the creation of Venture Scouting. Now it is the highest level in Venturing, still the highest youth rank overall.

The rank insignia predate World War II, but the symbolism at that time included each of the Three Sacred Treasures of Japan, with the left and right petals of the fleur-de-lis symbolizing the sacred jewel Yasakani no Magatama, and the central petal symbolizing the sacred sword Kusanagi-no-Tsurugi. The current design postdates World War II, and the current design of the rank badges dates from the 1980s.

In the SAJ a formal troop advancement ceremony is held once a year where Scouts receive rank advancement, merit badges, and other awards, and Scouts in the same school year receive the same rank advancement. It is uncommon for the Scouts' family members to attend, as it is a regular troop meeting.

The advancement program for members of the SAJ for Scout and Venture Scout sections will dramatically change from September 1, 2017, in concern that the previous advancement system failed in consistency and continuity of progress in Scouting activities. The major change is that this advancement program continues through the Scout section to the Venture Scout section, rather than separating the two. The Scout section program at present has five ranks, Scout, Tenderfoot, Second Class, First Class and Chrysanthemum, and the Venture Scout section has four ranks including Fuji Scout. After four years in the Scout section, Scouts presently move into Venture Scouting automatically and begin progress toward earning the four Venture program badges-Venture Second Class, Venture First Class, Peregrine Falcon and Fuji Scout-over the course of three years. However, from November 1, 2017, Venture Scouts will be required to earn just one more rank-Peregrine Falcon-above the badge they earned in the Scout section, before working toward Fuji Scout.

SAJ leaders are explaining this new advancement program prior to roll-out at Roundtable meetings for Scout leaders of Tokyo Scout Council, and there is some difficulty to understand the advancement program changes fully because of complexity.

The ranks are:

- Apprentice Scout
- Tenderfoot (Sho-kyu)
- Second Class (Ni-kyu)
- First Class (Ikkyu)
- Chrysanthemum (Kiku)

=== Venture Scouts ===
Venture Scout rank insignia

Venture Second Class, Venture First Class, Peregrine Falcon

A Venture Second Class Award may be earned for each of several categories. After earning the Venture Second Class Award and meeting tenure, leadership, personal growth, and other requirements, or having previously reached the Chrysanthemum rank, the Venturer may earn the Venture First Class Award. To earn the Peregrine Falcon Award, the Venturer must earn the Venture First Class Award. Venturers may also earn expert awards that build on one of the focus areas of the Venture Second Class Awards.

The ranks are:

- Venture Second Class
- Venture First Class
- Peregrine Falcon (Hayabusa)
- Fuji Scout

=== Fuji Scout ===
Fuji Scout insignia

Former version for Scout section; knot (still in use), present version for Venture section

The Fuji Scout is the highest rank and award a Venture Scout can achieve in the Scout Association of Japan. Named for Mount Fuji, the iconic symbol of Japan, it was formerly the highest rank in the Scout section prior to the creation of Venture Scouts. A Scout who attains this rank is also called a Fuji Scout or Fuji. This award has an earn rate of .5%, or 1 in 200 Scouts who stay with the program, as with the BSA, but since membership numbers are only about 3% of the BSA, issuance of the Fuji Scout is much rarer. Since its introduction, the Fuji Scout rank has been earned by fewer than 3000 Scouts. Venture members under the age of 18 may earn the Fuji Scout Award if they earned at least First Class rank in a Scout group.

=== Rover Scouts ===
Rover Scout insignia

Rover Scout hat brush

Rovering is the college-age program of the Scout Association of Japan. Usually a distinctive group emblem or the university logo is worn on the right sleeve or as a neckerchief pattern. The level itself is signified by a golden hat brush on a deep sky blue background, encircled by a rope annulus, symbolic of the World Scout Emblem.

== See also ==
- Ranks in Scouts BSA
- Ranks in Polish Scouting
- Ranks in Gerakan Pramuka Indonesia
