= Simon C. Yew =

Malaysian scout leader (1898–1983)

Datuk Simon C. Yew MBE
- Born: April 9, 1898; Fuzhou, China
- Died: February 24, 1983 (aged 84)
- Known for: Important figure in the development of Scouting in the Malaysian state of Sabah in Borneo
- Awards: Medal of Merit

Datuk Simon Chong Yew MBE (9 April 1898 – 1983), born Yew Siu Chang, was an important figure in the development of Scouting in the Malaysian state of Sabah in Borneo. He was also an accomplished artist.

== Life ==
Yew was born in Fuzhou, China, in 1898, and appointed an MBE in 1955.

== Scouting ==
Yew was a Scout leader in Fuzhou from 1919 to 1923. In 1923 he received his warrant (formal appointment) and after moving to North Borneo he joined the 1st Sandakan Scout Troop as a Scout leader under Reverend Thomas Cecil Alexander, who had founded Scouting in North Borneo in 1913.

In 1930 Yew formed the first Wolf Cub Pack in 1930 at St. Michael's Church, Sandakan. North Borneo's first official camping ground for Scouts was opened at Lok Kawi Scout Camping Ground in 1935, and the next year Yew brought 30 Sandakan Scouts there - a significant journey at the time - to camp. After the disruption to Scouting caused by the Japanese invasion of Borneo during the Second World War, Yew revitalised the Troop at All Saints' Church, Jesselton. He was appointed as West Coast District Commissioner in 1950 and travelled extensively visiting troops across this large and predominantly jungle district. He published a district magazine Scouting in Picture and introduced the Scouting Job Week, similar to the British Scouts' "Bob-a-job Week".

Yew was awarded a Medal of Merit in 1939. In recognition of his services to Scouting in North Borneo, he was awarded a Silver Acorn in 1953 by the then-Chief Scout of the British Commonwealth and Empire, Lord Rowallan, and two years later he was appointed an MBE by Queen Elizabeth. He was also appointed Datuk, a title roughly equivalent to a knighthood, after the independence of Sabah.

Yew retired from Scouting in 1959, but continued to serve on the Local Association, West Coast Council as a Lay member, and was made Honorary Commissioner.

In 1963 he received a Silver Wolf award from the then Chief Scout Sir Charles Maclean.

== Paintings ==
Yew was an accomplished artist, and painted many local scenes of North Borneo life, in watercolours and from 1957 he used oils as well. He signed his paintings “Simon C. Yew”, and some of his works are in the collection of the Sabah Art Gallery, the national art collection of Sabah, housed in Sabah Museum.

Yew’s watercolours were used to illustrate the front covers of Maxwell Hall’s books Kinabalu Guerillas and Labuan Story.
