= Malaysian Scouts Association =

Youth and educational organisation in Malaysia

Scouts Association of Malaysia
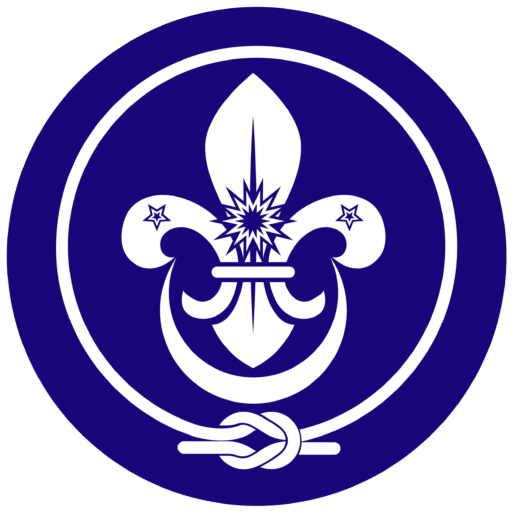
- Emblem for The Scouts Association of Malaysia
- Headquarters: B-P House, 4 Jalan Hang Jebat, 50150 Kuala Lumpur
- Country: Malaysia
- Founded: 1908
- Membership: 48,394 (2010) >300,000 (2023)
- Royal Patron: His Majesty the Yang di-Pertuan Agong Sultan Ibrahim Sultan Iskandar (Note: Current King of Malaysia.)
- President: Anwar Ibrahim (Note: Current Prime Minister of Malaysia.)
- National Chief Scout: Major General (R) Mohd Zin Bidin
- National Chief Scout Commissioner: Dr. Mohammed Mukhyuddin bin Sarwani
- Affiliation: World Organization of the Scout Movement
- Website https://scoutmy.org/

Malaysian Scouts Association, officially known as the Scouts Association of Malaysia (Malay: Persekutuan Pengakap Malaysia), is the largest informal youth and educational organisation in Malaysia, and member of World Organization of the Scout Movement (WOSM).

== History ==
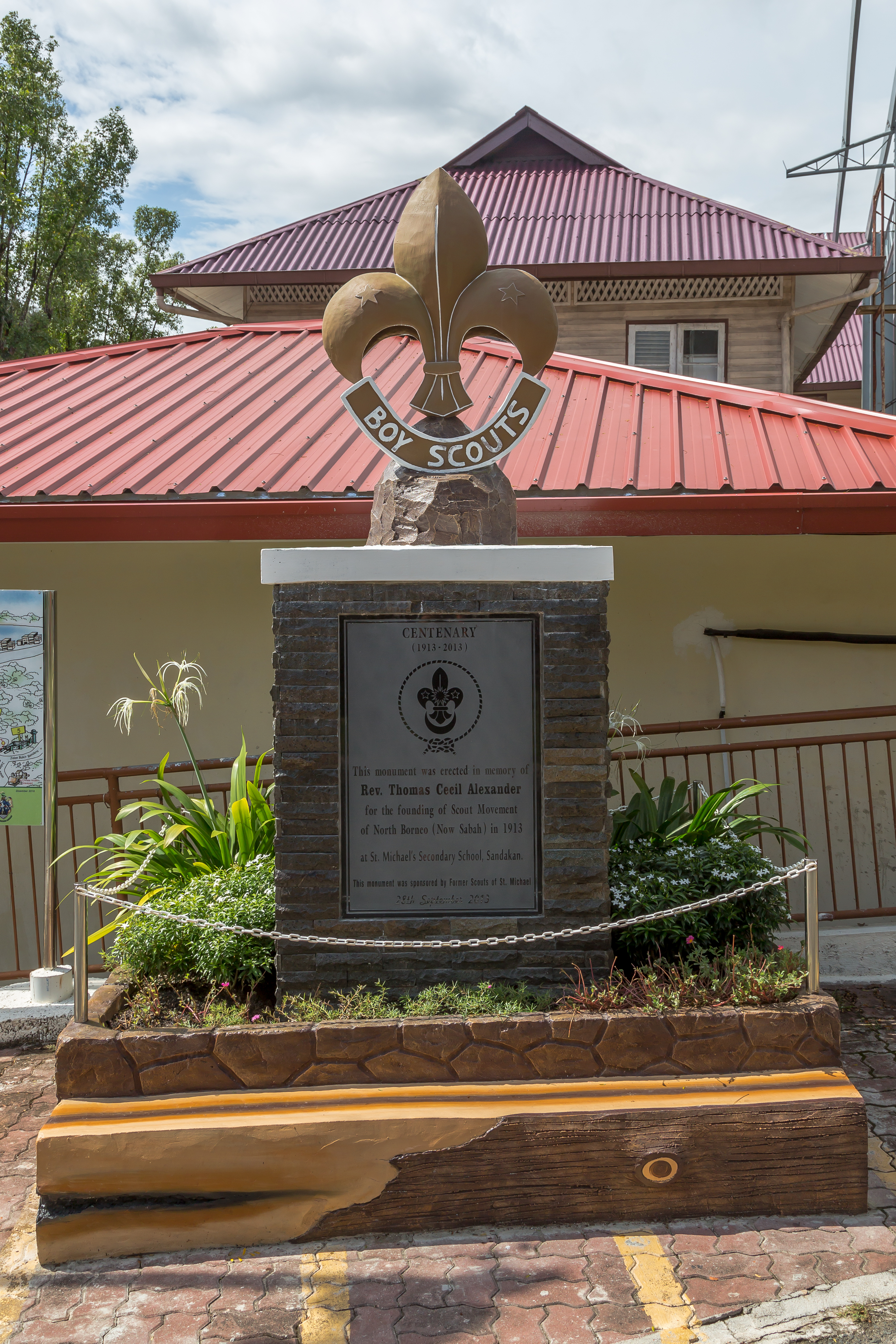
The centenary monument of Scout Movement in memory of Rev. Thomas Cecil Alexander at Sandakan, Sabah.

Scouting in Malaya (now Malaysia) was first introduced in Penang in 1908 as an experimental troop in YMCA before spreading throughout the entire peninsula.

Scouting took roots in 1908 and welcomed Lord Baden-Powell and Lady Olave Baden-Powell during their historical visit in 1934 to Penang, Kuala Kangsar, Ipoh and Kuala Lumpur.

After gaining independence on 31 August 1957, the Boy Scouts International Bureau formally issued membership on 1 September 1957 to the nation's Scouting body which took shape as Federation of Malaya Boy Scouts Association and officially established as Persekutuan Kanak-kanak Pengakap Malaysia or Boy Scouts Association of Malaysia and officially regulated by an act of Parliament through The Boy Scouts Association of Malaysia (Incorporation) Act No. 38, 1968.

It took on its current name as Persekutuan Pengakap Malaysia (PPM) or Scouts Association of Malaysia following an act of Parliament; Boy Scouts Association of Malaysia Act No. 143, 1974.

The previous patron of the PPM is the Yang di-Pertuan Agong Abdullah (2019–2024) while the President of PPM is the Prime Minister Anwar Ibrahim (since 2022). The current National Chief Scout (Malay: Ketua Pengakap Negara) is Major General (R) Prof. Dato' Dr. Haji Mohd Zin Bidin and National Chief Scout Commissioner (Malay: Ketua Pesuruhjaya Pengakap Negara) is Haji Nasaruddin Haji Shamsuddin.

In 1974, Datuk Syed Hashim bin Abdullah was awarded the Bronze Wolf, the only distinction of the World Organization of the Scout Movement, awarded by the World Scout Committee for exceptional services to world Scouting. Other recipients include Tan Sri Kamarul Ariffin bin Mohd Yassin in 1983.

On 2 May 2023, Prime Minister Anwar Ibrahim was proclaimed the President of the association and conferred the Golden Rice Spirit Star Award (Malay: Anugerah Bintang Semangat Padi Emas), the highest award of the association and exclusive award bestowed only on national and state leaders by Acting National Chief Scout and National Chief Scout Commissioner Mohd Zin Bidin. Mohd Zin also hoped the proclamation could take its image to greater heights, strengthen its role and attract more youths at the universities and schools to join it.

=== Founding of Scouting in the states of Malaysia ===
The founding of Scouts movements in the states of Malaysia were, by date and founder

- 1908 - Penang, YMCA experimental Troop
- 1909 - Selangor, 1st Selangor (now 1st Kuala Lumpur) in Victoria Institution by B.E. Shaw
- 1912 - Pahang, by G.M. Laidlow in Pekan, restored in 1927 by H.P. Hertslet
- 1913 - Sabah, by Reverend Thomas Cecil Alexander in Sandakan Scout Association of Malaysia Sabah Branch
- 1913 - Sarawak, by Reverend Thomas Cecil Alexander in Kuching (active only from 1930 onwards).
- March 27, 1915 - Penang, by Harold Ambrose Robinson Cheeseman in Penang Free School
- 1921 - Perak, by Mr. A. B. Samuels at Sekolah Menengah Kebangsaan Methodist, Ipoh (A.C.S Ipoh).
- 1922 - Kedah, by E.C. Hicks, E.A.G. Stuart, R.P.S. Walker and C.W. Bloomfield at Sultan Abdul Hamid College
- 1925 - Negeri Sembilan, in 1923 by British Resident Edward Shaw Hose at a missionary school in Seremban and by R. Brunstone, then in 1925 by Bird and Roger Smith who started organising for the entire state.
- 1926 - Malacca, by R. Brunstone
- 1927 - Terengganu, by A.J. Gracle
- 1927 - Kelantan, by Y.M. Tengku Ahmad Temenggong
- 1928 - Johor, by Harold Ambrose Robinson Cheeseman in the English College Johore Bahru (now Maktab Sultan Abu Bakar).
- 1931 - Perlis, by Bird and Roger Smith

== Scout leaders ==
Malaysian Scouts Association is led by National Chief Scout (Malay: Ketua Pengakap Negara), who is the top executive responsible for high-level decisions and association's vision, and assisted by National Chief Scout Commissioner (Malay: Ketua Pesuruhjaya Pengakap Negara), who oversees day-to-day operations.

=== National Chief Scouts ===
List of national chiefs scout since 1952 until today.

| # | Name of National Chief Scouts | In office | Years in position |
|---|---|---|---|
| 1. | Gerald Templer | 1952–1954 | 2 years |
| 2. | Donald MacGillivray | 1954–1957 | 3 years |
| 3. | Suleiman Abdul Rahman | 1957–1961 | 4 years |
| 4. | Abdul Rahman Talib | 1961–1963 | 2 years |
| 5. | Sardon Jubir | 1963–1973 | 10 years |
| 6. | Mohamed Yaacob | 1973–1978 | 5 years |
| 7. | Sulaiman Daud | 1984–2005 | 21 years |
| 8. | Shafie Salleh | 2005–2019 | 14 years |
| 9. | Mohd Zin Bidin | 2023–present | 3 years |

=== National Chief Commissioners ===
List of national chief commissioners since 1910 until today.

| # | Name of National Chief Commissioners | In office | Years in position |
|---|---|---|---|
| 1. | Frank Cooper Sands | 1910–1948 | 38 years |
| 2. | E. M. F. Payne | 1948–1957 | 9 years |
| 3. | Mohamad Yusof Ahmad | 1957–1960 | 3 years |
| 4. | Zainal Abidin Ali | 1960–1963 | 3 years |
| 5. | Syed Esa Alwee | 1963–1968 | 5 years |
| 6. | Syed Hashim Abdullah | 1969–1987 | 18 years |
| 7. | Wan Puteh Wan Mohd Saman | 1987–1989 | 2 years |
| 8. | Yang Rashdi Maasom | 1989–2000 | 11 years |
| 9. | Hamidin Abdullah | 2000–2003 | 3 years |
| 10. | Kamaruddin Kachar | 2003–2008 | 5 years |
| 11. | Kaharudin Momin | 2008–2011 | 3 years |
| 12. | Mohamad Shahrum Osman | 2012–2016 | 4 years |
| 13. | Mohd Zin Bidin | 2016–2024 | 8 years |
| 14. | Nasaruddin Shamsuddin | 2024–2025 | 2 years |
| 15. | Mohammed Mukhyuddin Sarwani | 2026–present | 0 year |

== Leadership structure ==
- Royal Patron:
  - His Majesty Sultan Ibrahim Sultan Iskandar (Note: Every King of Malaysia will serve as the official Royal Patron of the Scouts Association of Malaysia during his term of office, following the example of the Scout Association in the UK.)
- National President:
  - Dato' Seri Haji Anwar Ibrahim (Note: Every Prime Minister of Malaysia will serve as the President of the Scouts Association of Malaysia.)
- National Chief Scout:
  - Major General (R) Prof. Datuk Wira Dr. Haji Mohd Zin Bidin
- National Chief Commissioner:
  - Mohammed Mukhyuddin Sarwani
- Deputy National Chief Commissioner:
  - Vacant
- Deputy National Chief Commissioner:
  - Haji Ahmad Sabri Saad
- Deputy National Chief Commissioner:
  - Ts. Mohd Hilmi Abu Bakar
- Manager:
  - Mohamad Firdauz Hamzah
- Chief Executive Secretary:
  - Mohd Haffiz Hamdan Shukor

== States ==
The PPM is organized into 15 territorial councils and two national at-large councils:

1. Perlis
2. Kedah
3. Pulau Pinang
4. Perak
5. Selangor
6. Kuala Lumpur
7. Negeri Sembilan
8. Melaka
9. Johor
10. Pahang
11. Terengganu
12. Kelantan
13. Sabah
14. Sarawak
15. Labuan
16. Kumpulan Latihan Malaysia
17. Kumpulan Latihan Kelanasiswa Malaysia

== Sections ==
Scouting in Malaysia is primarily school-based and as such, the Scouting sections are organised as follow:

1. Primary School Level - Cub Scouts (Malay: Pengakap Kanak-Kanak): Between 9 and 12 years old or Standard 3 to Standard 6. Motto: "Do Your Best" (Malay: Buat Habis Baik), official colour: Blue.
2. Lower Secondary School Level - Junior Scouts (Malay: Pengakap Muda) between 13 and 15 years old or Form 1 to 3. Motto: "Be Prepared" (Malay: Sedia Selalu), official colour: Green.
3. Upper Secondary School Level - Senior Scouts (Malay: Pengakap Remaja) between 15 and 17 1/2 years old or Form 4 to 5. Motto: "Look Wide" (Malay: Pandang Luas), official colour: Yellow.
4. Pre-University Level - Rovers (Malay: Pengakap Kelana) between 17 1/2 and 26 years old or Form 6. Motto: "Service" (Malay: Berkhidmat), official colour: Red.
5. Higher Educational Institutions and Universities - Rovers - Malaysian University Rover Training Group (Malay: Kumpulan Latihan Kelanasiswa Malaysia) or KLKM. Between 17 1/2 and 26 years old. Motto: "Service" (Malay: Berkhidmat), official colour: Red.
6. Teachers' Training Colleges & Institutions - Rovers & Adult Leaders - Malaysian Training Group (Malay: Kumpulan Latihan Malaysia) or KLM Between 20 and 26 years old. Rover Motto: "Service" (Malay: Berkhidmat), official colour: Red. Teachers at training colleges undergo and complete woodbadge adult leadership training and streamed according to their assigned service to a primary or secondary school.

== Uniform ==
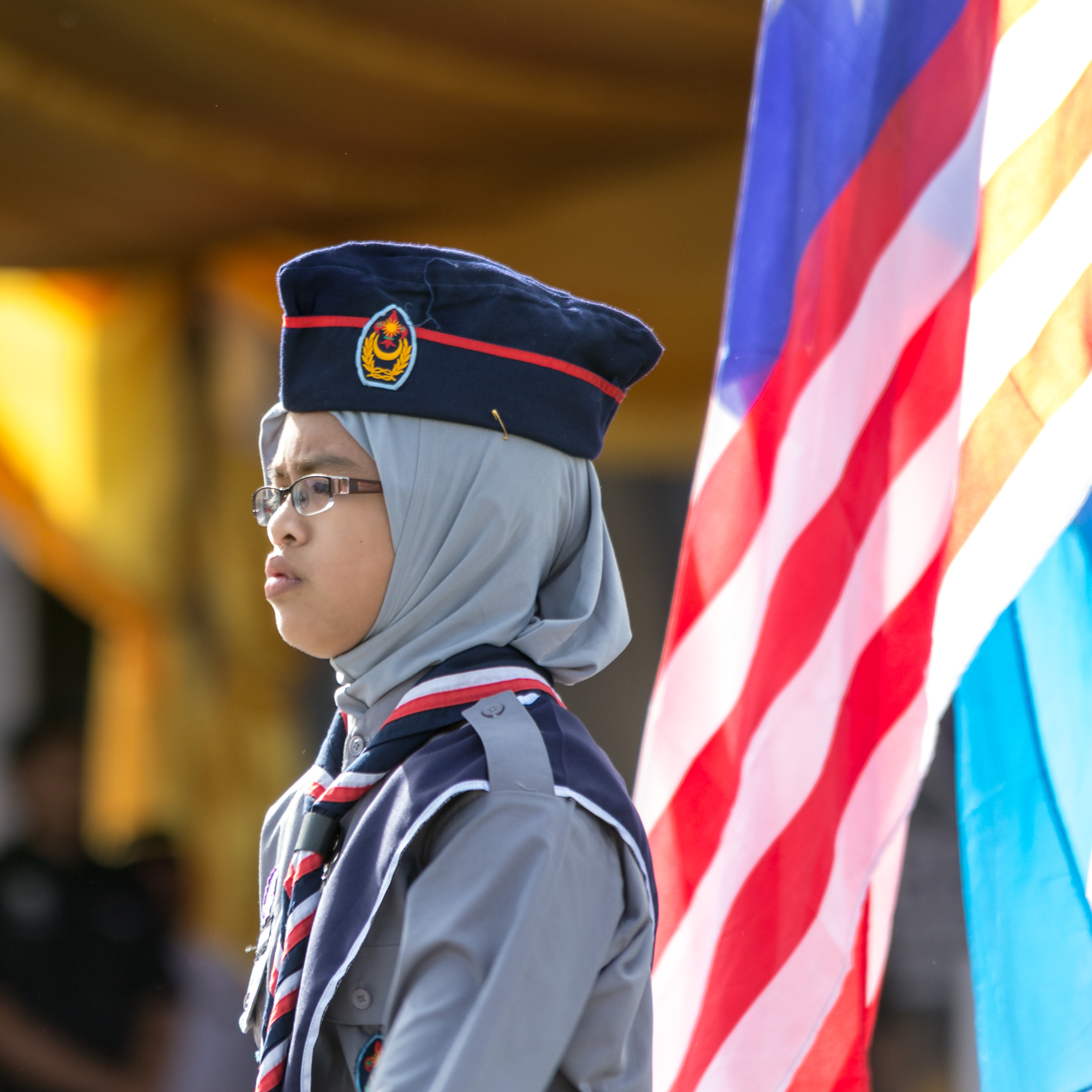
A Malaysian Girl Scout at the parade during the celebrations of Hari Merdeka 2013.

A Junior Scout's uniform consists of a short-sleeve (girls wear long sleeves) grey shirt, with two pockets with buttons on the left and right breast, the official neckerchief, the forage cap, navy-blue pants, the official bronze belt, navy-blue socks and black canvas shoes with laces. A miniature Malaysian flag is stitched on the right breast pocket and the Tenderfoot badge (analogous to the same-named first rank in the Boy Scouts of America) stitched on the left one. The neckerchief has red, white and blue stripes and is worn around the collar, fastened with the official woggle. The forage cap has a badge with the Malaysian Scout emblem on one side.

On the left sleeve are one's patrol's name and merit badges. On the right sleeve is one's state, district, and troop number. The advancement badge is sewn below the troop number when a Junior Scout earns it. Depending on a Junior Scout's rank and/or badges, he/she may be allowed to wear a lanyard.

A Senior Scout's uniform is the same as the Junior Scout's except for the position of badges. The King's Scout badge is worn on the left sleeve, five centimetres below the patrol badge. On the left sleeve is one's patrol's name, and one's advancement badges. The Senior Scout's have up to five advancement badges. Once taken, the Senior Scout will go on to become a King's Scout. The King's Scout badge is worn five centimeters below the patrol badge in place of all five Senior Badges, while the miniature King's Scout Badge is worn on the left sleeve.

The only differences between a Leader's (Rovers/Scoutmasters) uniform and that of Junior Scouts are the insignia sewn on and the epaulets worn. The Chief Scout and Assistant Scoutmasters wear blue epaulets with various symbols, while Rovers wear red epaulets. Each Rover Crew is allowed to create its own crew emblem, which is displayed on the right arm underneath the Crew Letter. The advancement badges for Rovers are worn on the left chest, below the Rover badge.

Colours of epaulette and shoulder patch:

Epaulette
| Colour | Wearer |
|---|---|
| Red | Rover Scouts (Kelana) |
| Grey | Staff |
| Purple | Trainers |
| Blue | Commissioners |
| Green | Lay officers |
| Maroon | Elected officials |
| Yellow | Royal family |

Beret
| Colour | Wearer |
|---|---|
| Indigo | Sea Scout |
| Navy blue | Air Scout |

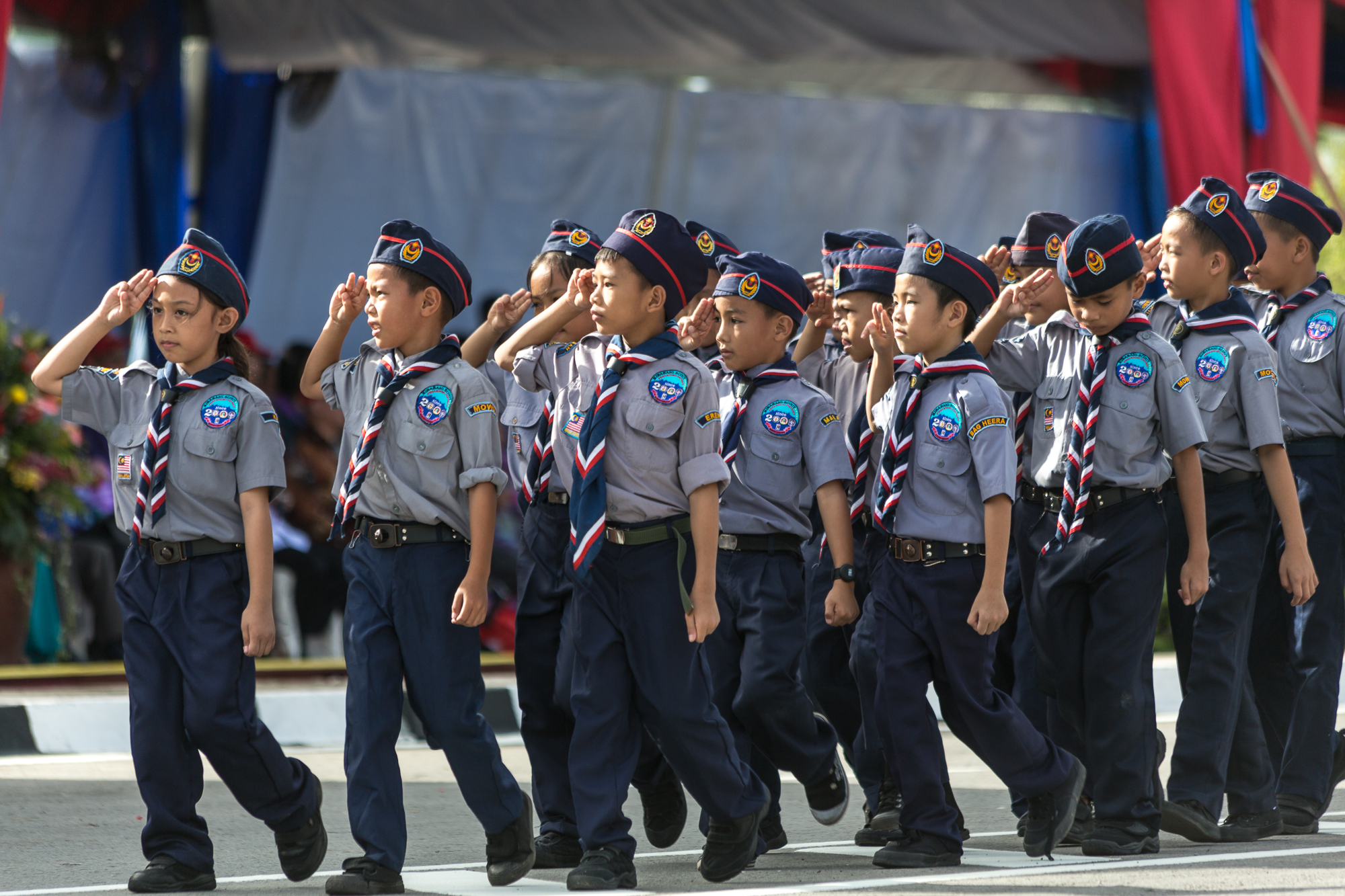
A group of Scouts giving Scout sign during the celebrations of Hari Merdeka 2013

== Badge progression scheme ==
The Scout emblem incorporates elements of the coat of arms of Malaysia.

Regardless of which unit one is a member of, one must pass the Tenderfoot (Malay: Keahlian) test before being eligible for any other badges. This test examines one on one's qualifications to become a Scout, testing one on the Scout uniform, Scout emblems, Scout oath, Scout laws, Scout salute and sign, the history of Scouting, and basic knot-tying, such as tying a reef knot.

For Cub Scouts (Malay: Pengakap Kanak-Kanak), one may receive the Bronze Dagger (Malay: Keris Gangsa) badge, Silver Dagger (Malay: Keris Perak) badge and Gold Dagger (Malay: Keris Emas) badge. The dagger (Malay: Keris) is a Malay dagger used as an official weapon by the royalty. One must attain all preceding badges before qualifying for the next one. Besides that, one may also receive various merit badges throughout the course of receiving the three dagger (Malay: Keris) badges. Someone who has achieved the Gold Dagger (Malay: Keris Emas) badge with certain merit badges is entitled to wear the Cub Scout Cord (Malay: Rambu Pengakap Kanak-Kanak), which is blue in colour.

For Junior Scout (Malay: Pengakap Muda), one may receive the Third Class (Malay: Usaha) badge, Second Class (Malay: Maju) badge and First Class (Malay: Jaya) badge. One must attain all preceding badges before qualifying for the next one. Same as the previous stage, one can also receive a total of eight merit badges; two for hobbies, three for knowledge, and another three for service. Someone who achieves the First Class badge with the eight other merit badges is entitled to wear the Junior Scout Cord (Malay: Rambu Pengakap Muda), which is green in colour.

For Senior Scout (Malay: Pengakap Remaja), one earns Independence (Malay: Jaya Diri) badge, Skills (Malay: Kemahiran) badge, Activities (Malay: Kegiatan) badge, Expedition (Malay: Ekspedisi) badge and Service (Malay: Perkhidmatan) badge. These badges are known as the Five Highest Badges (Malay: Lima Lencana Tertinggi), and a pre-requisite before being assessed as a King's Scout (Malay: Pengakap Raja).

== King's Scout Award ==
The qualified candidate will hand in his/her application form to the district commissioner together with his/her logbooks and certs (of all badges received). He/she will be evaluated and assessed during Pre-King's Scout Assessment Camp (Malay: Kem Ujian Pra-Penarafan Pengakap Raja), which has these components: Responsibility (Malay: Tanggungjawab), Expedition (Malay: Pengembaraan), Community Service (Malay: Perkhidmatan Masyarakat), Activity (Malay: Kegiatan), and Independence (Malay: Berdikari). Once a candidate completes and passes the Pre-King's Scout Assessment Camp (Malay: Kem Ujian Pra-Penarafan Pengakap Raja), he/she is recognised and allowed to wear a royal yellow Senior Scout's Cord (Malay: Rambu Pengakap Remaja), and therefore has all the requirements ready for King's Scout certification.

The candidate then progresses to attend the King's Scout Assessment Camp (Malay: Kem Penarafan Pengakap Raja), a three-day two-nights organised by his/her respective State King's Scout Assessment Council (Malay: Lembaga Penaraf Pengakap Raja Negeri). Such an assessment follows the national scheme and involves camping, campcraft, pioneering, first aid, estimation, knots and lashing, map reading, foot and stave drills, backwoods' man cooking, songs, personal and group interviews, handicraft making and more.

Upon passing all the required tests, the candidate is accorded and allowed to wear a royal yellow coloured Bushman's Thong, which is self-made.

After all documentation has been completely vetted at headquarters, the candidate will have earned the yellow, blue and green King's Scout Badge (Malay: Lencana Pengakap Raja) which is worn on their left sleeve. They will also be invited to the Royal Palace of their respective state and bestowed the prestigious King's Scout Certificate (Malay: Sijil Pengakap Raja), by the Royal Ruler of that state, representing His Majesty the King of Malaysia, the Patron of the PPM. The certificate is unique as it bears 10 signatures, lead foremost by the current King of Malaysia and the 9 State Rulers. There are, thus far, no other certificates in such a similar manner. If in a non-Royal state, His Majesty's signature is present first and foremost.

Junior Scouts who receive the King's Scout Certificate and Badge while in their age level are required to pass the Pre-King's Scout Assessment Camp (Malay: Kem Ujian Pra-Penarafan Pengakap Raja), the King's Scout Assessment Camp (Malay: Kem Penarafan Pengakap Raja) and all other requirements, if so needed should all the requirements be accomplished. Unlike the Senior Scouts, candidates from this age group carry the Junior Scout Cord.

== Troop organization ==
A troop is divided into several patrols, each with its own patrol leader and assistant patrol leader. A committee called the Patrol Leaders' Council plans all the troop's activities, with guidance from the troop's Scoutmaster(s). The Patrol Leaders' Council consists of all the patrol leaders and their assistants. From the Patrol Leaders' Council, Patrol Leaders are elected to become the Troop Leader, Assistant Troop Leader, Troop Secretary, Troop Treasurer and Troop Quartermaster. This committee is called the Court of Honour (COH) and is the most exclusive committee in a troop. The posts mentioned are the least a troop can have. Besides the above-mentioned posts, other posts such as Discipline Officer, Den warden, Librarian, IT Director, Historian and much more can be added if the need should arise.

A patrol itself, besides its patrol leader and assistant patrol leader, has a secretary for taking down the details of a patrol meeting, has a treasurer for recording the financial matters and has a quartermaster for taking care of the patrol's equipment. During camp, the quartermaster becomes the equipment quartermaster, and a food quartermaster is appointed. The secretary becomes assistant patrol leader if the patrol leader or assistant patrol leader does not show up for a meeting.

== Malaysian Scout Jamborees ==
The Malaysian Scout Jamboree is the national jamboree and held since 1966. Each state takes turns to host this event. The list of Jamborees are:

- 1966 – Telok Bahang, Penang: Camp Chief – Tan Sri Wong Pow Nee
- 1970 – Malacca
- 1974 – Johor
- 1978 – Sarawak
- 1982 – Kelantan
- 1986 – Pahang
- 1989 – Perak
- 1992 – Sabah
- 1997 – Terengganu
- 2002 – Kedah
- 2006 – Negeri Sembilan: 11th Malaysian Scouts Jamboree (December 12–19, Ulu Bendul Recreational Park, Kuala Pilah) | Camp Chief: Hamdan Bin Hj. Mohd Nor, Negeri Sembilan State Chief Scout Commissioner
- 2011 – Terengganu: 12th Malaysian Scouts Jamboree (November 19–25, Telaga Batin Scout Camp, Kuala Terengganu)
- 2016 – Federal Territory - Kuala Lumpur: 13th Malaysian Scouts Jamboree (November 25 - December 1, Metropolitan Batu Park, Kuala Lumpur) | Camp Chief: Dato' Dr. Elli Bin Haji Mohd Tahir, Federal Territory - Kuala Lumpur State Chief Scout Commissioner
- 2024 – Selangor: 14th Malaysian Scouts Jamboree (December 21 - 27, Taman Tasik Milenium, Kuala Kubu Bharu)

== B-P House ==
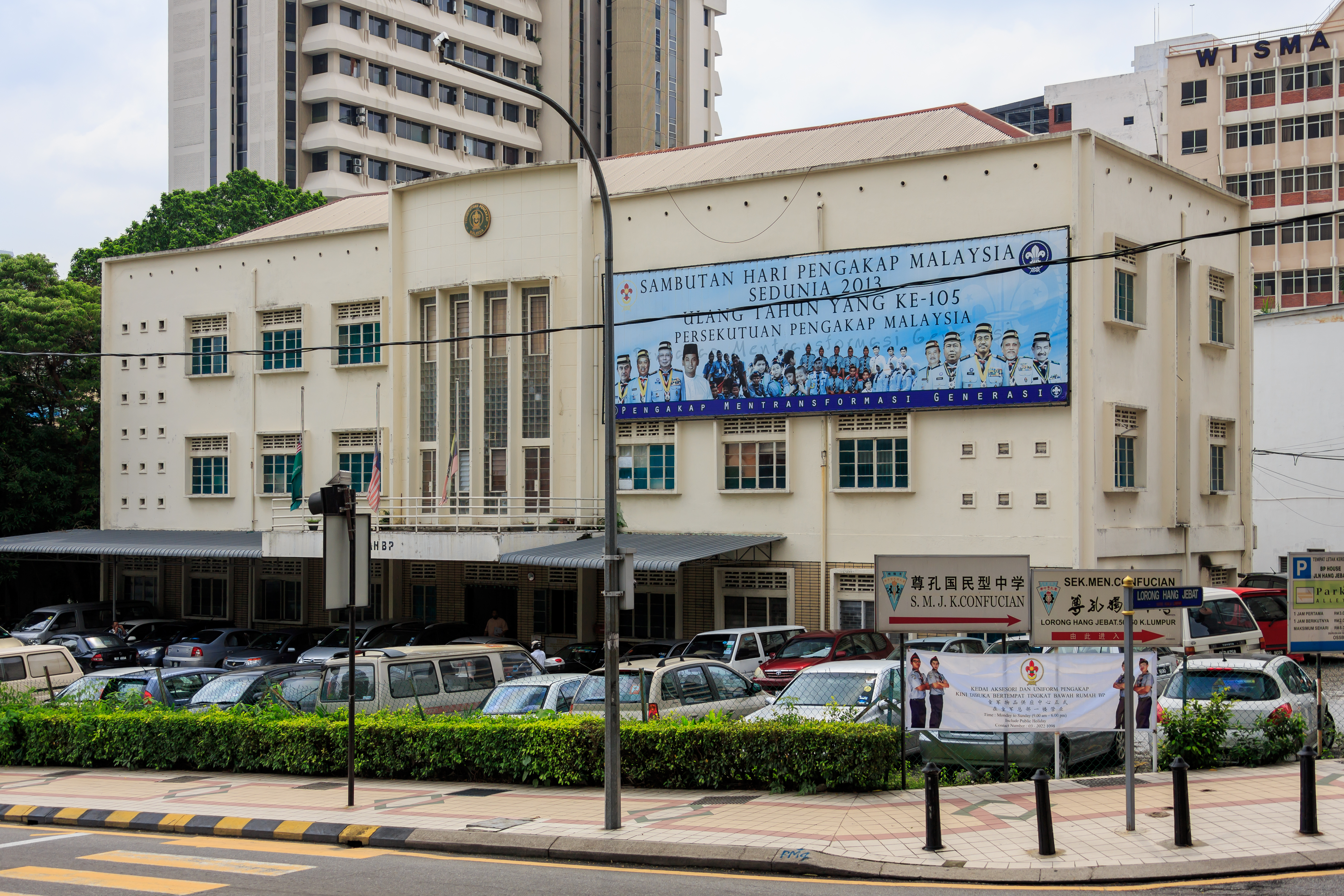
B-P House in Kuala Lumpur

The headquarters for Persekutuan Pengakap Malaysia or Scouts Association of Malaysia is Rumah B-P or B-P House. It is located in Kuala Lumpur at 4 Jalan Hang Jebat (formerly Davidson Road), 50150 Kuala Lumpur.

The foundation was laid on May 16, 1954 by Pengakap Agong Persekutuan Tanah Melayu or Federated Malay States Chief Scout Commissioner General Sir Gerald Walter Robert Templer KG, GCB, GCMG, KBE, DSO, who was then the British High Commissioner of Malaya prior to his departure on May 31, 1954. B-P House was constructed at a cost of RM150,000 and took three years to complete. It was formally officiated by His Excellency Sir Donald Macgillivray KCMG, MBE, Pengakap Agung Persekutuan Tanah Melayu or Federated Malay States Chief Scout Commissioner on January 5, 1957 to commemorate the 100th birth year of Lord Baden-Powell (February 22, 1857) and also 50th anniversary of world Scouting (1907 - 1957).

The 4-storey building has recently undergone a major renovation with a large hall on the left wing, a museum on the right wing, a Scout shop with its own separate entrance on the ground floor, the National Chief Scout, National Chief Scout Commissioner and administration offices on the 1st floor, hostels on the 3rd and 4th floor.

It is about 12 minutes by car to World Scout Bureau - Global Support Centre Kuala Lumpur, within walking distance to the iconic Petaling Street, Pasar Seni or Central Market and PUTRA-LRT station.

The Scout headquarters serves as a national centre for administration for Scout matters. It currently has a paid staff of 9. Meetings and leadership courses are held there.

== Gilwell Scouts Nature Park Sandakan ==
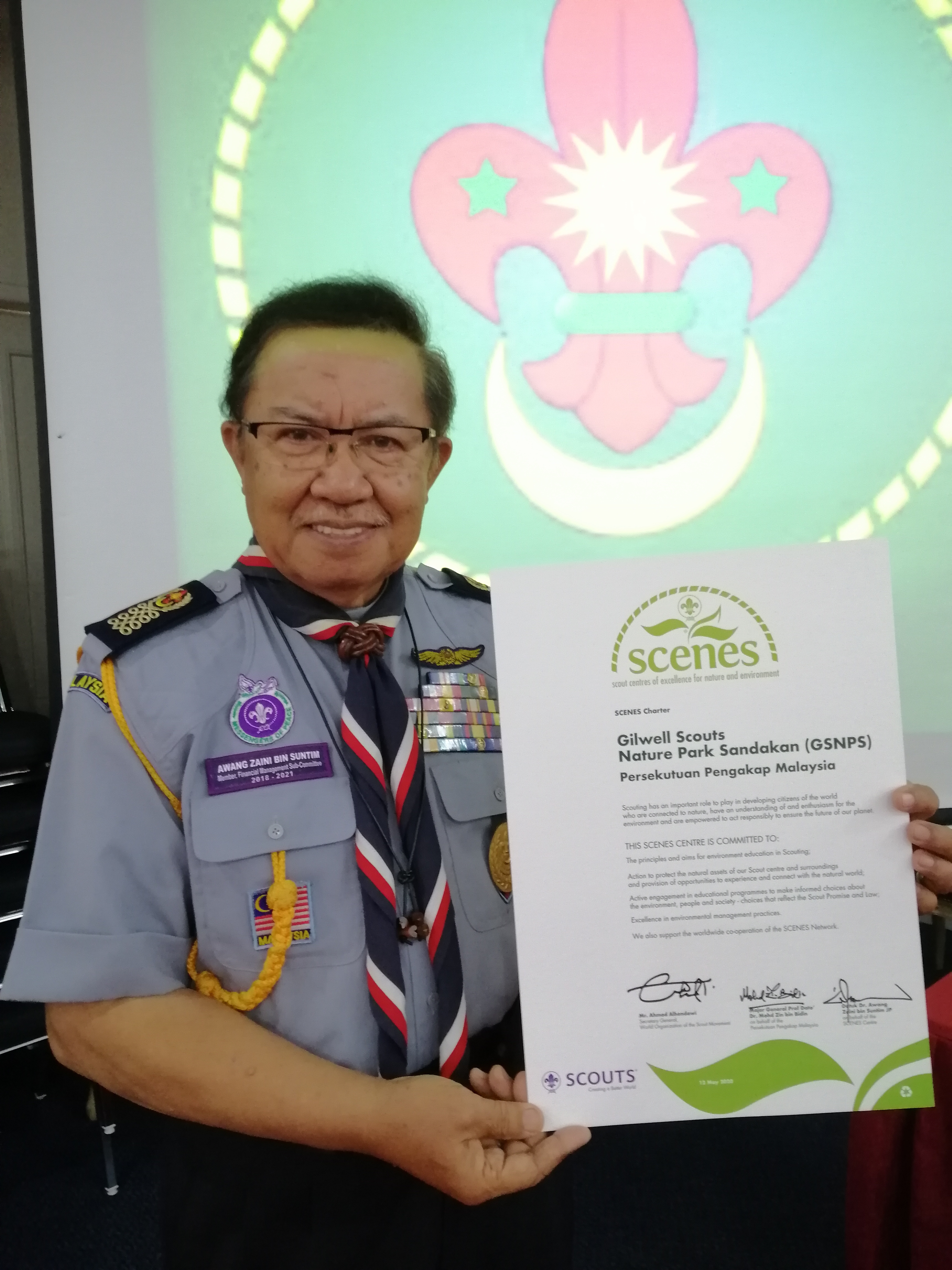
PPMCS State Chief Commissioner Datuk Awang Zaini receiving the WOSM SCENES Charter at B-P House, Kuala Lumpur on 25 July 2020

Persekutuan Pengakap Malaysia proposed the idea of Gilwell Scouts Nature Park Sandakan (Gilwell SNP Sandakan) applying to be part of World Organization of the Scout Movement's Scout Centre of Excellence for Nature, Environment and Sustainability or SCENES on April 10, 2019. This proposal was endorsed on August 4, 2019. The 12 acre Gilwell SNP Sandakan is owned and operated by Persekutuan Pengakap Malaysia Cawangan Sabah (PPMCS), one of 17 members in the federation of Scouting in Malaysia. The application and all pertaining information was authored and submitted in March 2020 to World Scout Bureau Global Support Centre Kuala Lumpur. The World Scout Bureau approved Gilwell SNP Sandakan for official accreditation as a SCENES centre on May 12, 2020 after approvals from PPM, Asia-Pacific Region and WOSM. This is a historic milestone with Gilwell SNP Sandakan as the first SCENES in Malaysia and the third in Asia Pacific, after Hong Kong and Taiwan.

== See also ==
- Frank Cooper Sands
- Gilwell Scouts Nature Park Sandakan
- Eric Khoo Heng-Pheng
- Simon C. Yew
- Persatuan Pandu Puteri Malaysia
- GeorgeTown (S) Scout District
