= Gilwell Scouts Nature Park Sandakan =

Malaysian camp site and activity centre for Scouting and other youth organisations

- Gilwell Scouts Nature Park Sandakan (Malaysia)
- Owner: Persekutuan Pengakap Malaysia Cawangan Sabah
- Location: Mile 4 ½, Borehole Road, 90000 Sandakan, Sabah
- Country: Malaysia
- Coordinates: 5°50′43.4″N 118°4′25.9″E
- Camp size: 12 acres
- Awarded for: Scout Centre for Excellence in Nature, Environment and Sustainability (12 May 2020)/ First in Malaysia
- Chair, Board of Management: Datuk Hj Awang Zaini Hj Suntim
- Manager: AM Yaakub AD Yahya
- Website www.facebook.com/Gilwell-Scouts-Nature-Park-Sandakan-111293993914805

Gilwell Scouts Nature Park Sandakan (Gilwell SNP Sandakan) is located in Sandakan, Sabah on the isle of Borneo in Sabah, which is the second largest state in the federation of Malaysia and shares the island of Borneo with Sarawak, Brunei and Indonesia Kalimantan.

It is an environmental educational park that is operated and owned since August 15, 2003 by Persekutuan Pengakap Malaysia Cawangan Sabah (PPMCS), the largest youth organisation in Sabah and a member state of the Scouting federation in Malaysia. Gilwell SNP Sandakan currently has more than 25 attractions, facilities and growing. Gilwell SNP Sandakan emphasises efforts in environmental management and education to contribute in achieving United Nations Sustainable Development Goals, and Sabah State's social and biodiversity objectives.

The World Organization of Scout Movement certified and accredited Gilwell SNP Sandakan as part of its Scout Centre for Excellence in Nature, Environment and Sustainability (SCENES) network on May 12, 2021. This is a significant milestone for Scouting in Malaysia, considering World Organization of Scout Movement has certified 38 others worldwide, of which only 3 (including Gilwell SNP Sandakan) are located in Asia Pacific. The accreditation of Gilwell SNP Sandakan, Malaysia as part of the global SCENES network is a watershed moment and matter of national pride. The SCENES charter from World Organization of Scout Movement was signed by its Secretary General Ahmad Alhendawi, Persekutuan Pengakap Malaysia national Chief Scout Commissioner Maj. Gen. Prof. Dato' Dr. Mohd Zin Bidin (R)and PPMCS State Chief Commissioner Datuk Awang Zaini bin Suntim _{JP}.

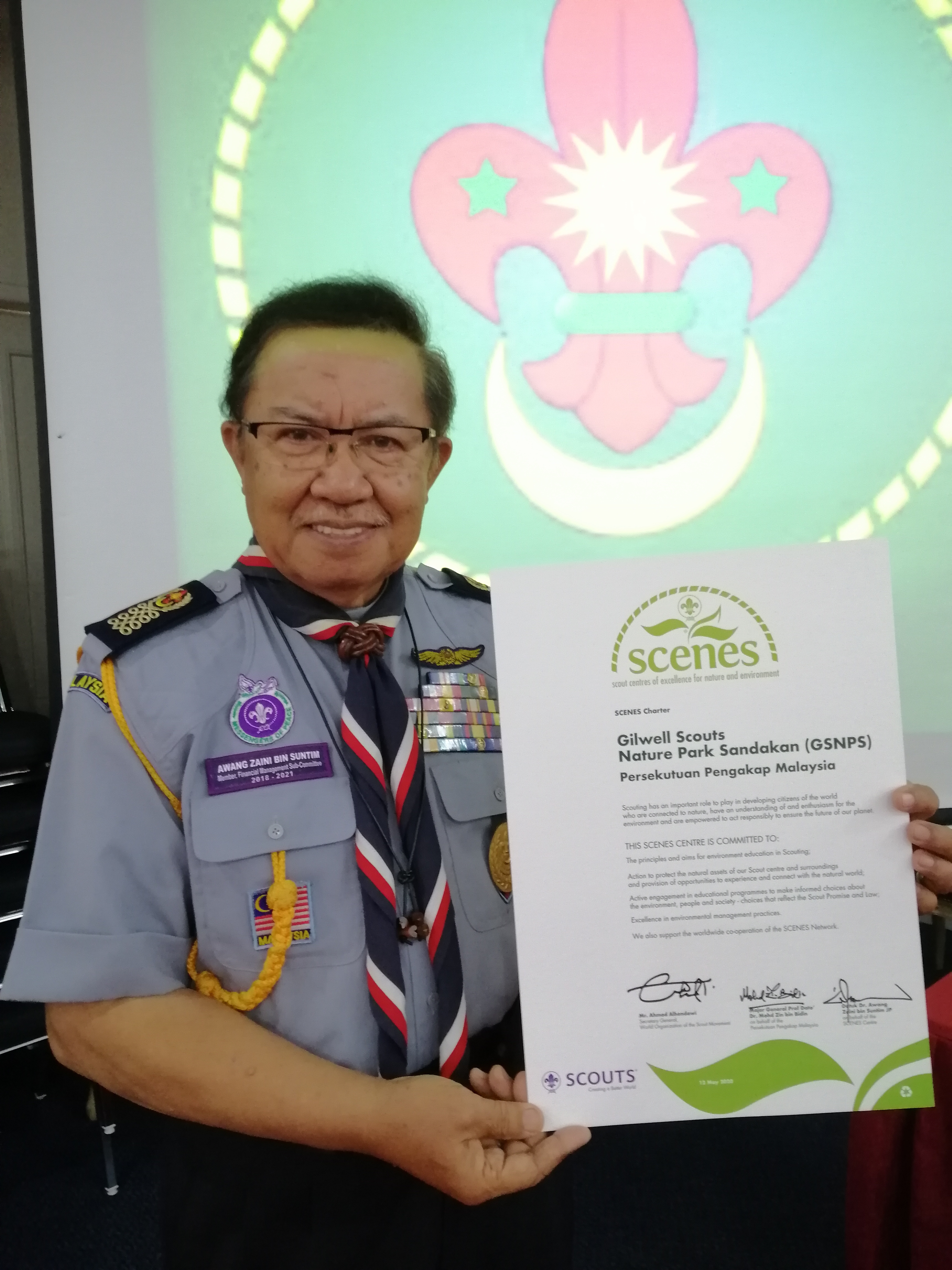
PPMCS State Chief Commissioner Datuk Awang Zaini receiving the WOSM SCENES Charter at B-P House, Kuala Lumpur on 25 July 2020

It seeks to promote and educate Scouts, communities, partners and foreign visitors about sustainable living and practices as an environmental educational park. As such, Gilwell SNP Sandakan satisfies three mandatory SCENES criteria i.e. have a natural area, provide environmental education and practice environmental management. This marks another new chapter for Scouting in Sabah, which started with the first Scouts and Scout Troop in Sandakan in 1913, credited to Reverend Canon Thomas Cecil Alexander, part of the Anglican Mission. He is credited as the founder of the Scout movement in North Borneo and continued to serve until 1926 before returning to England. There is a letter, dated December 22, 1913, written by Reverend Canon Thomas Cecil Alexander to Colonel H.S. Brownrigg in England, who was then Commissioner for Overseas Dominions and Colonies at that time, informing about the establishment of the first Scout group in North Borneo. This historical letter is archived and preserved at PPMCS Headquarters which is B-P House Sabah in Kota Kinabalu. Colonel H.S. Brownrigg is one of three persons instrumental in organising the historical King's Rally at Windsor Great Park on Tuesday, July 4, 1911, attended by 30,000 Scouts. The other two were Sir Herbert Plumer and Percy Everett.

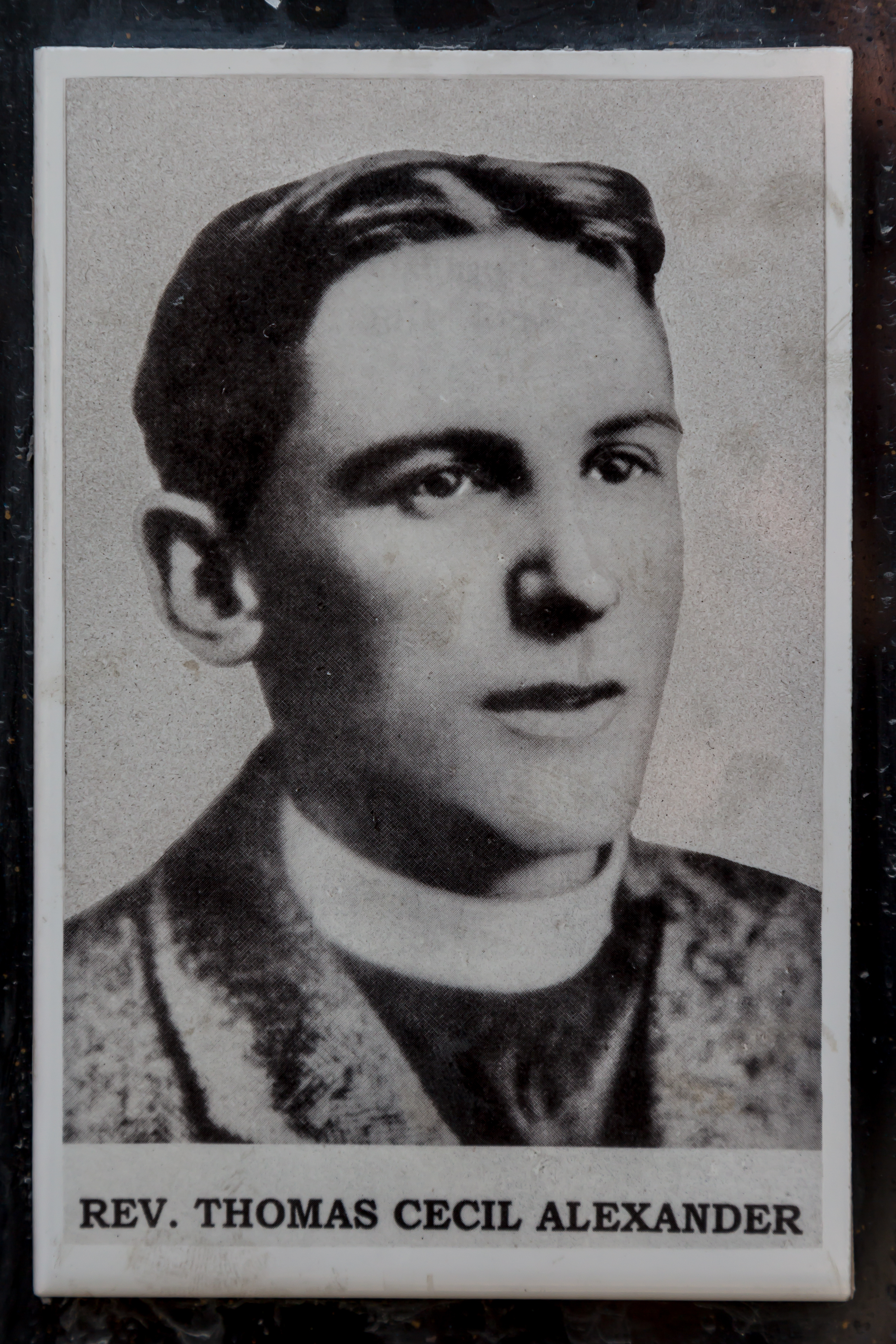
Reverend Canon Thomas Cecil Alexander, as depicted on the North Borneo Scout Movement Monument in Sandakan.

The Government of Sabah has granted the land title for Gilwell SNP Sandakan to PPMCS, which employs and operate it with seven (7) full-time employees since 2017. The park was established on August 15, 2003, as part of preparations to commemorate 100 Years of Scouting in Sabah or Scouting Centennial Anniversary in Sabah, in 2013. The Sabah State Government gazetted District (Bil Pelan 07125491) for Scouting purposes as per Land Ordinance Chapter 68 Declaration of Land Reserved for State Land Sandakan District Under Section 28 (1) (No. JKM PHB 600-2/56 (8)) dated September 1, 2015 after approval from then Sabah State Chief Minister Datuk Musa Hj Aman on August 11, 2005, in perpetuity with no expiry term. By default, the Government of Sabah Chief Minister is Gilwell SNP Sandakan's Patron.

== Land area ==
The land area of Gilwell SNP Sandakan is 12 acres with less than 2 acres developed. This minimal land use allows about 10 acres left untouched, preserving its natural environment and vegetative state. The 2 acres house permanent structures (e.g. Main Office, Main Hall, Amateur Radio Hut, etc.), roadworks, equipment and utilities (e.g. water pump hut, nursery), marked for three campsites; Meliau, Cengal and Belian. It is surrounded by natural primary and secondary tropical jungle and acts as a designated water catchment area for the district of Sandakan. The preservation of forest coverage in this area, including Gilwell SNP Sandakan, mitigates unexpected rising water level during the monsoon season from several tributary streams which borders Sandakan and neighbouring districts. Asides flood control, the protected area helps minimise landslides and thus ensures the safety of populations in Sandakan and nearby areas. In Jan 2022, Sandakan was among areas badly affected by the seasonal monsoon.

== Impact of Covid-19 ==
In October 2020, Sabah was rated as having record the most COVID-19 deaths in Malaysia at 43 from a national fatality total of 167. This was due to Sabah suffering its second wave of the pandemic. Sandakan reported 97 new daily cases alone, the highest in Sabah on Oct 14, 2020. With the on-going vaccination programme, the number of infection subsided and Sandakan reported only 14 new cases on April 13, 2022. Giwell SNP Sandakan is re-opening in June 2022 after being closed since March 2020.

== Distance to Town and Airport ==
Gilwell SNP Sandakan is located within a 5-minute drive from the centre of Sandakan, Sabah, with good access from public transport and a mere 12 minutes or 7.8 km from Sandakan International Airport. There are numerous direct flights to Sandakan making Gilwell SNP Sandakan easily accessible from various destinations like 45 minutes by flight from Kota Kinabalu, state capital of Sabah; 3 hours by flight from Kuala Lumpur International Airport, Kuala Lumpur, capital of Malaysia; 6 hours 25 minutes by flight from Suvarnabhumi Airport, Bangkok, Thailand; 8 hour 10 minutes from Hong Kong International Airport, Hong Kong and Soekarno-Hatta International Airport, Jakarta, Indonesia; 9 hours and 5 minutes from Incheon International Airport, Seoul, Korea and; 10 hours and 15 minutes from Ninoy Aquino International Airport, Manila, Philippines.

== See also ==
- Thomas Cecil Alexander
- Sandakan
- Sandakan Airport
