= Lumuyu Petroglyphs =

Archaeological site in Tenom District, Malaysia

Lumuyu Petroglyphs Lumuyu Rock Carvings
- Interactive map of Lumuyu Petroglyphs; Lumuyu Rock Carvings
- 4°42′0″N 115°52′59.988″E
- Location: Tenom District, Sabah, Malaysia

Site notes
- Owner: Sabah Museum

Lumuyu Petroglyphs or also called as Lumuyu Rock Carvings (Malay: Petroglif Lumuyu/Ukiran Batu Lumuyu) comprising several petroglyphs situated not far from the Bekuku Village in Ulu Tomani of Tenom District in Sabah, Malaysia.

== History ==
The first rock carving in Ulu Tomani were discovered by local villagers in 1971. With a measure of 25 feet (8 m) by 32 feet (10 m), the weathered sandstone boulder is carved with patterns similar to human faces, foot prints and several other patterns. According to local folklore, the carvings were made by six brothers to release their grief at the loss of their youngest brother who was murdered. These carvings are believed to have been crafted 1,000 years ago. The area have been declared as Cultural Heritage under the Cultural Heritage Enactment (Conservation) 1997.

Following the redocumentation of the Lumuyu Petroglyph site in Ulu Tomani in 2012, this led to a new finding for exploration by the following years. In 2013, a group of archaeologists led by Baszley Bee assisted by Master students and final year history students of the School of Social Sciences (SSS) including staff from the Archaeology Department of the National Heritage Department and Archaeology Division of the Sabah Museum found four new petroglyph sites at Ulu Tomani including in other area in Long Pasia.
