= Syed Hashim Abdullah =

Malaysian scouting leader (born 1914)

Datuk Syed Hashim bin Abdullah

National Chief Commissioner of the Persekutuan Pengakap Malaysia
- In office 1969–1987
- Preceded by: Syed Esa Alwee
- Succeeded by: Wan Puteh Wan Mohd Saman

Datuk Syed Hashim bin Abdullah (born 29 September 1914, date of death unknown) served as the National Chief Scout Commissioner of the Persekutuan Pengakap Malaysia between 1969 and 1987, one of the longest to hold this post. In 1974, he was awarded the 87th Bronze Wolf, the only distinction of the World Organization of the Scout Movement, awarded by the World Scout Committee for exceptional services to world Scouting.
