= Maxwell Hall =

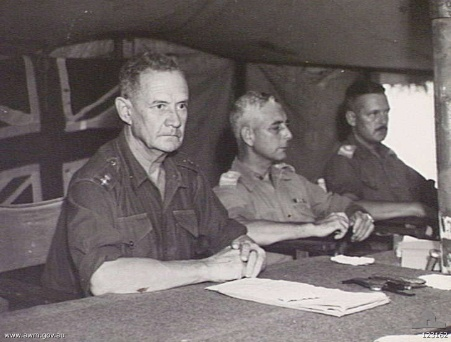
Lt. Col. John Maxwell Hall on the left of the picture, at the War Crimes Trial of Japanese officers, December 1945, Labuan.

John Maxwell Hall (7 October 1884 – 30 July 1966), known most commonly as Maxwell Hall, was a British colonial administrator, judge and author who lived in and wrote about North Borneo (now Sabah).

== Early life and career ==
Hall was born at Kempshot, near Montego Bay, Jamaica, on 7 October 1884, the son of Maxwell Hall and Agnes Gertrude Tullis.

Hall was appointed West Coast Resident, North Borneo, in 1931. Before World War II and the Japanese invasion of Borneo, Maxwell Hall was a senior judge. Immediately after the war he was the Chief Advocate at some of the war crimes trials held at Labuan (holding the rank of Lieutenant Colonel) and was attached to BBCAU, the British Borneo Civil Affairs Unit which was responsible for the running of North Borneo and other territories after the handover from Australian military control.

== A description by K. G. Tregonning ==
In his 1960 book North Borneo, K. G. Tregonning described Maxwell Hall as

J. Maxwell Hall, a retired senior officer of the Chartered Company ... one of the very few elderly Englishmen living in the Colony ... the grand old man of the territory.

He lives in a two-storied wooden house, sparsely furnished, as befits his Spartan physique, the owner of some fifty acres of land. On this he has built a half dozen homes, which he rents, with five acres or so of land, to Chinese market gardeners ... He lives as a South-East Asian squire, in solitary contentment: but instead of becoming, after fifty years' service in North Borneo, the grand old man of reminiscences ... this grizzled old live-wire lives vigorously for the present and the future. He is perhaps one of the most wide-awake and pertinent observers of the North Borneo of today whom it was my privilege to meet.

He has written well of the past, in several hard-to-secure books published locally, for he has an historian's bent, and he has contributed numerous articles ... He is writing yet another tale, the history of Labuan. But all this is relaxation; for he is no ivory tower writer, and it is the problems and the possibilities of the present that interest his wide-ranging curiosity and evoke his keenest comments.

Several of Maxwell Hall's books have been reprinted, most recently Labuan Story: Memoirs of a Small Island near the Coast of North Borneo in 2008.

== Selected works by Maxwell Hall ==
- 1929 revised S.S. Cookson's The Ordinances of the State of North Borneo, 1881-1915 (revised again by C.F.C. Macaskie in 1937)
- 1949 Kinabalu Guerrillas: An account of the Double Tenth 1943 Kuching: The Sarawak Press. Relates the history of the Japanese occupation of Borneo and the Jesselton Revolt. Contains information about the civil resistance to Japanese occupation, the reactions of the ethnic peoples and their relationship to the Japanese, and includes a few graphic sketches, including the Petagas cemetery which is now known as the Petagas War Memorial. The front cover a watercolour painting of Mount Kinabalu by Simon C. Yew. Reprinted by the Borneo Literature Bureau several times in the 1960s.
- 1950 Makan Siap: Table Tales of North Borneo Labuan: Foo Tong Chai, Capitol (also a 1951 Singapore Jitts & Co. edition) Contains twenty-four sketches and stories.
- 1954 Prepared a seventh supplemental volume to G. Bannerman Kellager, Laws of North Borneo, in force on the 30th June 1953, Revised edition, 1954 entitled Supplement to the Revised Edition and containing the Ordinances and subsidiary legislation enacted between July 1953 and the last day of December 1954
- 1955 "Musah of Paitan River" North Borneo and Sabah Times. Recounts the history leading up to Musah's rebellion against the government in 1908 and the years of fighting afterwards.
- 1956 "The old fort at Kinarut in Sabah: a relic of three hundred years ago" Malayan Historical Journal 3:43–49. Recounts the history of a fort at Kinarut and discusses its name.
- 1958 Labuan Story: Memoirs of a Small Island near the Coast of North Borneo Jesselton, North Borneo: Chung Nam. Front cover a watercolour painting of junks by Simon C. Yew. Reprinted by Silverfish Books in 2008.

== Bibliography ==
- Doolittle, Amity, 2003, "Colliding discourses: Western land laws and native customary rights in North Borneo, 1881-1918" Journal of Southeast Asian Studies vol 34,
