= Harold Cheeseman =

English educator & founder of the Scouting movement in Penang (1890-1961)

Harold Ambrose Robinson Cheeseman (1890 – 23 November 1961) was an English educator who was founder of the Scouting movement in the Malaysian state of Penang, at the Penang Free School on 27 March 1915, and in the state of Johor at the English College Johore Bahru in 1928.

The Penang Free School Scout troop, comprising two patrols, was formed under Cheeseman as the Scouter-in-charge. Activities in these early days ranged from carpentry to ju-jitsu. The Scouts toured the Malay Peninsula in 1918 and stirred up great interest in Scouting among boys. Under Cheeseman, Scouting in the school went hand-in-hand with the School Cadet Corps. The two organisations were so close, that a ruling was passed by which all cadets who had passed the Second Class badge tests, and all Scouts over 5 feet tall, had to join the Cadet Corps.

In 1925, Scouts and cadets were separated, and soon, the first First Class Scouts on the island were produced. There was also a Wolf Club pack, as Penang Free School was not yet solely a secondary school. When it was decreed that students had to join one of the three major school activities, the number of Scouts increased, and it was decided that each house in the school should have a Scout Troop of its own.

Around 1934, the Scouts of Penang put on a grand display for the occasion of Lord Baden-Powell's visit to the island, including an acanthi rope bridge.

During the Japanese occupation of Malaya, Scouting was prohibited, and several Penang Scouts proved their bravery and were awarded the Gilt Cross after the World War II.

In 1946, during his tenure as the deputy director of Education for the Straits Settlements, he prepared the Cheeseman Report with the goal of restructuring the curriculum for the vernacular schools. The plan recommended that:

- The provision of free basic education in all media of instruction for all. Primary and secondary vernacular education are permitted to use English, Malay, Mandarin and Tamil as the respective medium of instruction.
- English language was introduced as the compulsory subject for all vernacular schools.
- Only two types of secondary school are established which is middle-school and high school
- Vocational education introduced as stated in the 1938 Education Report

The plan was later strongly opposed by Malay nationalists and they refuse to accept equal status for all four language streams of primary education and also the lack of national integration policy and the plan was abandoned in 1949.

In 1961, Cheeseman died suddenly in Ramsgate, where he just been hired as administrator at Hereson School.
