= R. Brunstone =

Malaysian scoutmaster

R. Brunstone was the founder of the Scouting movement in the Malaysian state of Melaka, at Malacca in 1926, and cofounder in the state of Negeri Sembilan, also in 1926.
