= Bird and Roger Smith =

- Known for: Cofounders of the Scouting movement in the Malaysian state of Negeri Sembilan

Bird and Roger Smith were cofounders of the Scouting movement in the Malaysian state of Negeri Sembilan in 1926, and founders in the state of Perlis in 1931.
