= Holy Cross R.C. Secondary School =

School in Kent, England

Coordinates: 51.3528°N 1.4340°E

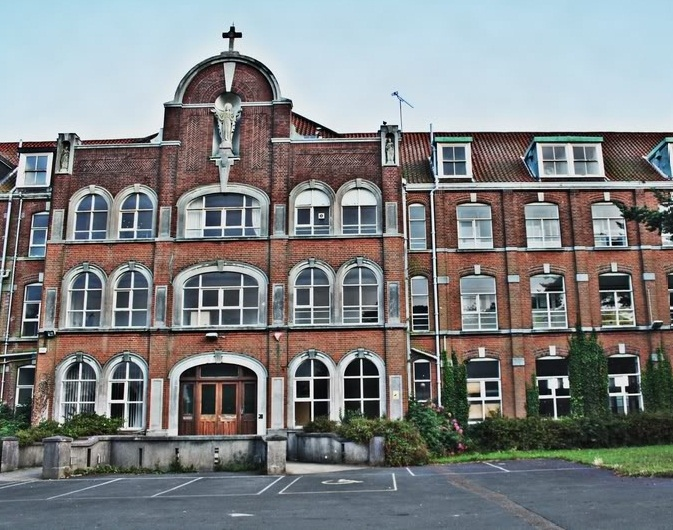
- Holy Cross school's main entrance
- Ramsgate Road, Broadstairs, Kent, CT10 1PJ; England

Information
- Type: Secondary modern school
- Established: 1962
- Closed: 1998
- Campus type: Suburban
- Affiliation: Roman Catholic

Holy Cross R.C. Secondary School (1962–1998) was a former Roman Catholic Secondary modern school and sixth form college located in Broadstairs, Kent, it was co-educational from years 7 to 11.

== History ==
Holy Cross was built in 1930 for the Daughters of the Cross as a Convent and by 1931 it was run as a residential open air school for sick and delicate children and as a Convalescent home, run by Catholic nuns. It closed down in 1939 due to World War II when it acted as a hospital and re-opened in 1947. In 1962 it became a Catholic Secondary modern school which was mixed sex and catered for around 520 pupils, the school was situated in Broadstairs, Kent, for children from the ages of 11 to 17 and was under the controlling authority of Kent County Council (KCC).

The Holy Cross admission policy was mainly for children of a Roman Catholic background although the school admitted a large number of children for an atheist background as well as different faiths and religions.

The Holy Cross school's old Victorian styled building was built near the cliff tops of Broadstairs on the East Kent coast. It consisted of a school block that housed year groups, 6 to 11 and had its own separate chapel for school mass and religious celebrations. It also had a separate hall for school assemblies which doubled as a gymnasium, as well as four tennis courts and two playing fields, the first of which was used for football and rugby for boys' P.E. lessons, and the second of which was used for hockey and netball for girls' P.E. lessons.

In 1990 Holy Cross decided to invest in a sixth form study centre for its pupils when the school converted an old 1930s gatehouse at the entrance of the grounds as a place to study away from the school, whilst still within school premises.

In February 1992 the school suffered a large and devastating fire which damaged the top floor of the 1930s main block just above the chapel, with over 500 pupils being led to safety. The fire caused an estimated £100,000 worth of damage, and took a further £500,000 to repair, and although the top floor was closed off the school itself didn't close and carried on as a place of learning while the building was being repaired and refurbished.

== Uniform ==
Throughout its existence as a secondary modern school, the Holy Cross uniform consisted of a white shirt, blue jumper, school tie and a blue blazer with the school's emblem on the pocket. Boys wore either black or blue trousers and girls wore a blue skirt.

The Holy Cross school badge was a shield with a cross and three wavy lines depicting the sea, due to the school's close proximity to the coast. The school's motto was, In hoc signo vinces, meaning "In this sign you will conquer". By the 1980s the school's dress code became less formal and more relaxed, with the school dropping the need for a blazer and tie.

== Closure ==
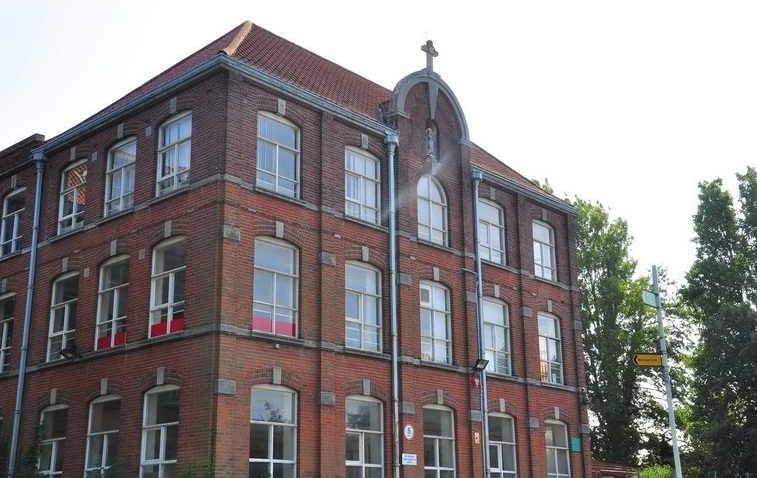
The side entrance to Holy Cross R.C. secondary school, in Broadstairs, Kent, 2011.

On 31 August 1998 the school's education standards had dropped below average as had its pupil admissions and KCC education authority stepped in and made a decision to close down Holy Cross as a Catholic school, although the school itself would carry on under a different name as an all-boys school.

Coincidentally two neighbouring schools in Ramsgate, Kent, Hereson secondary school for boys and Ellington secondary school for girls, were in a similar situation, . Hereson school was to be the new temporary tenants of Holy Cross from 1999 for over 470 pupils when their original school buildings on Lillian road, became dilapidated and were demolished by property developers to make way for a row of 16 terraced houses, Hereson school was the tenant of Holy Cross between 1999 and 2008.

Ellington school's old building on Ellington Place, Ramsgate, eventually closed in 2008 with the old Victorian Grade II Listed building being developed into 16 flats and renamed Blethyn Court in honour of the actress Brenda Blethyn who was a former pupil. A further 12 affordable houses were built on the surrounding land, which was named Old School Row, and the schools playground was also developed upon and turned into a GP surgery named Dashwood Medical Centre, as well as a Courts pharmacy and car park with its entrance on Grange Road.

Ellington school had already moved to a new state-of-the-art purpose-built £10 million campus located on Newlands Lane, Ramsgate, and shortly afterwards Hereson school vacated Holy Cross and the two schools were formally amalgamated in 2009 to make The Ellington and Hereson School, when they both transferred to the new site.

== Development ==
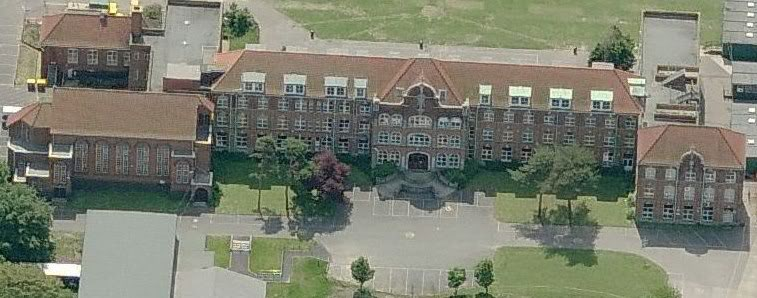
This is an aerial view of Holy Cross R.C. Secondary school, in Broadstairs, Kent, 2011.

After Hereson vacated the school another use had to be found for the Holy Cross. The building itself was considered an important architectural landmark in Broadstairs, therefore the desire to keep it was strong among the local residents with some people holding protests, but the land was far too valuable and with a shortage of cheap affordable housing in Broadstairs the school along with its grounds became a desirable prospect for housing developers.

Finally the decision to use the school's surrounding land and playing fields for property development was agreed by Thanet District Council (TDC), with the demolition of the 1930 building beginning in 2012, bringing to an end of nearly 70 years for Holy Cross as a hospital and place of learning.

On 6 September 2012 a planning application was submitted to TDC by Abbey New Homes, based in Hertfordshire, to build 150 dwellings on Holy Cross's school grounds and playing fields. On 21 December 2012 TDC granted permission for Abbey New Homes to build the new housing development, with DAC Architects, based in Gravesend, Kent, assigned to design the new homes.
