= Sabah Museum =

Museum in Kota Kinabalu, Sabah, Malaysia

- Muzium Sabah
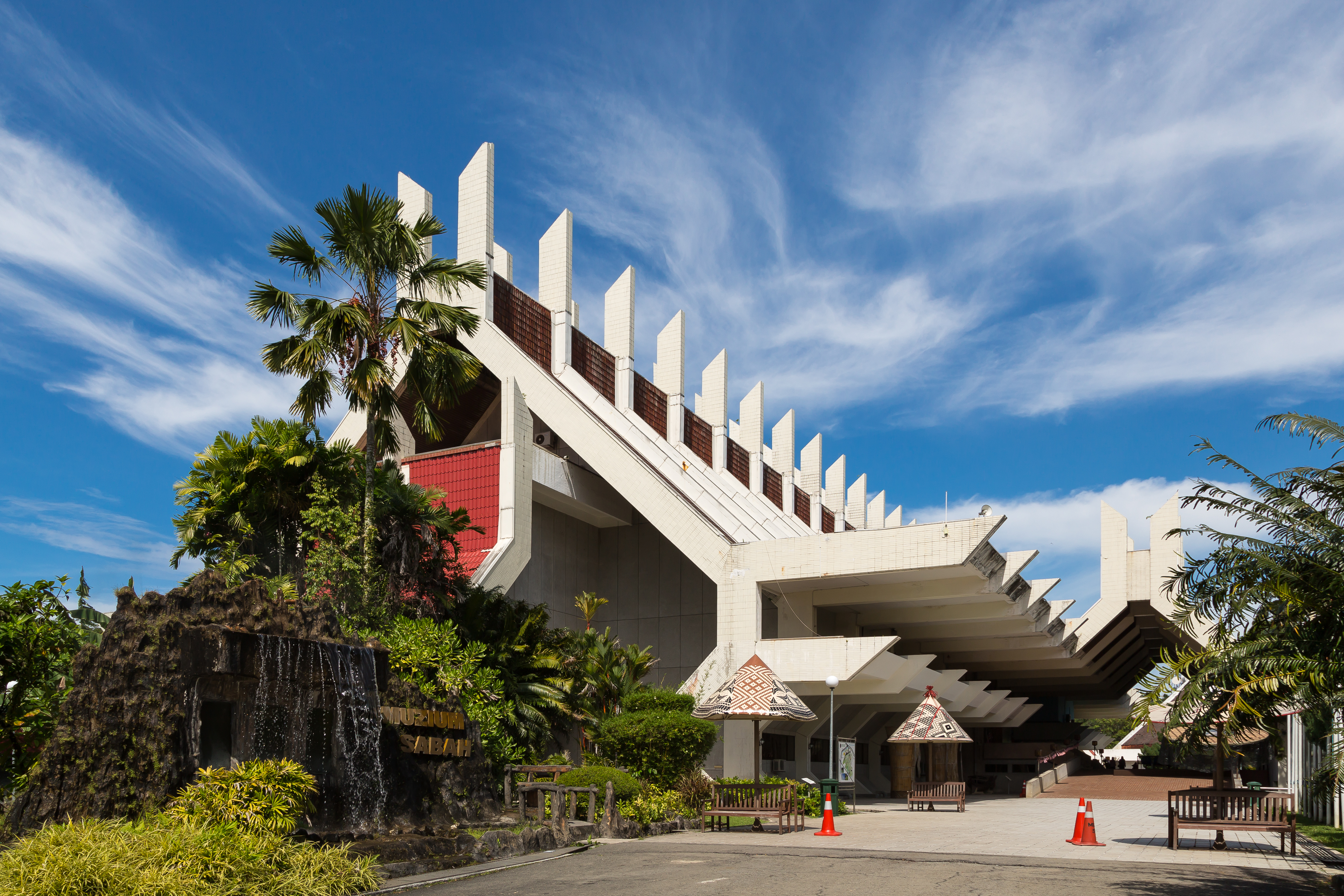
- Established: 11 April 1984
- Location: Kota Kinabalu, Sabah
- Coordinates: 5°57′38″N 116°04′18″E
- Type: Museum
- Founder: Sabah Society
- Owner: Government of Sabah
- Website: www.museum.sabah.gov.my

The Sabah Museum (Malay: Muzium Sabah) is the state museum of Sabah, Malaysia. It is sited on 17 hectares (42 acres) of land at Bukit Istana Lama in Kota Kinabalu, the state capital.

== History ==
The original Sabah Museum location was established on 15 July 1965 in a shophouse in Gaya Street, Kota Kinabalu, largely due to the efforts of the Sabah Society. George Cathcart Woolley collection of photographs, diaries and other artefacts, bequeathed to the State Government of Sabah, formed the nucleus of the museum. The first curator of the museum was E. J. Berwick. The museum administration then came under the State Ministry of Community Services and within the same year in 1981 under the initiative of former Sabah Chief Minister Harris Salleh, a total of M$31.2 million was gathered for the construction of a new museum building with the construction started on 1 June. The following year, the museum administration came under the State Ministry of Culture, Youth and Sports where it finally moved into its present location on 11 April 1984. The new building was officiated on 11 April 1984 by the seventh Yang di-Pertuan Agong, Sultan Ahmad Shah of Pahang through his visit on the state (which also marked his final engagement prior to his end of reign two weeks later on April 25 the same year).

== Features ==
The complex contains not only the museum proper, but also an ethnobotanic garden, a zoo and a heritage village. The main building also houses the Sabah Art Gallery. Other galleries cover Islamic civilisation, archaeology and history, natural history, and ceramics and brassware. The mission of the museum is to collect, preserve, conserve and document ethnographic, archaeological, historical, numismatic, art-historical, botanical, zoological and mineralogical collections from throughout the state, and to conduct research on important and interesting aspects of Sabah's history, culture, and social and natural history.

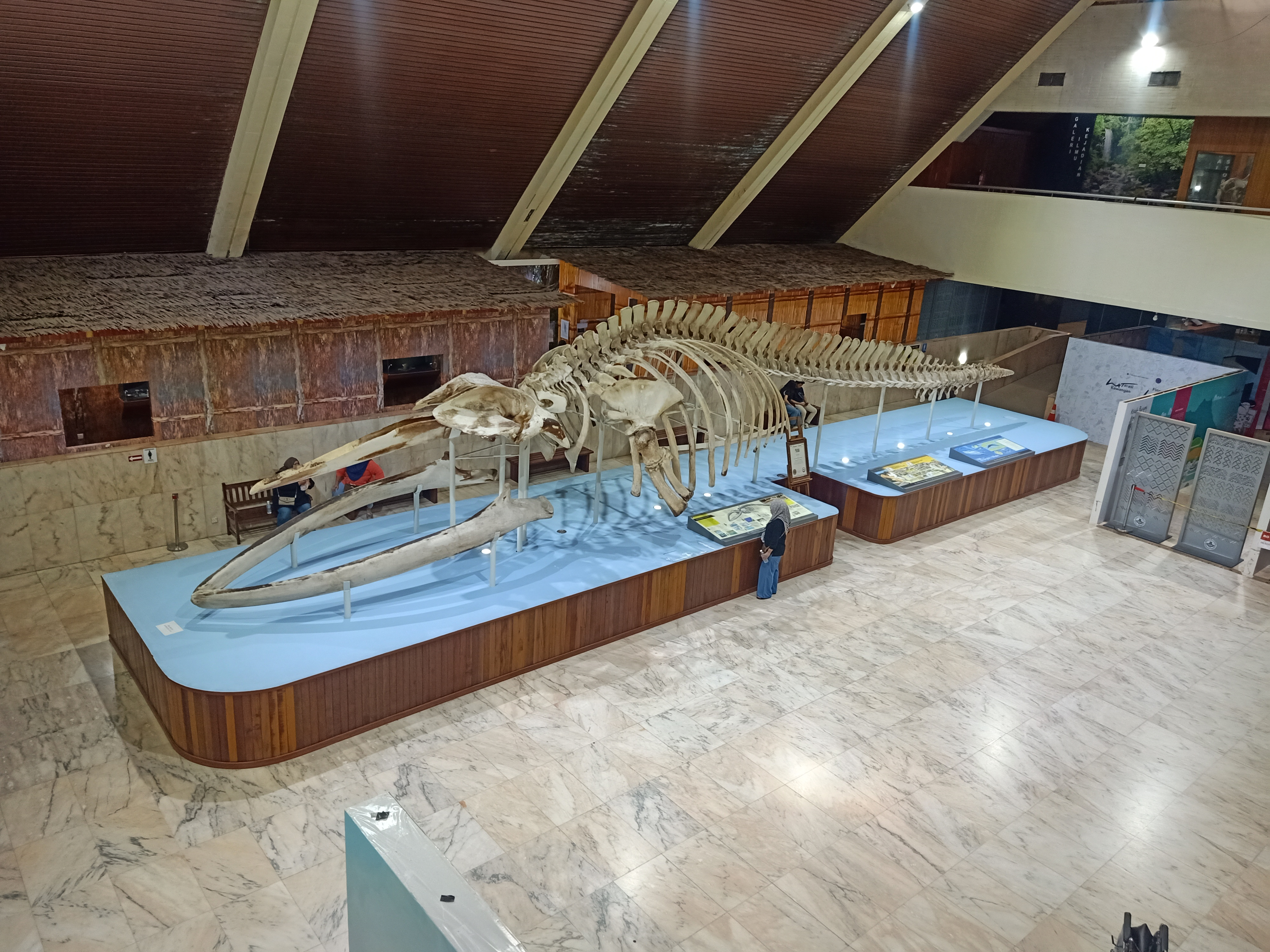
Whale skeleton

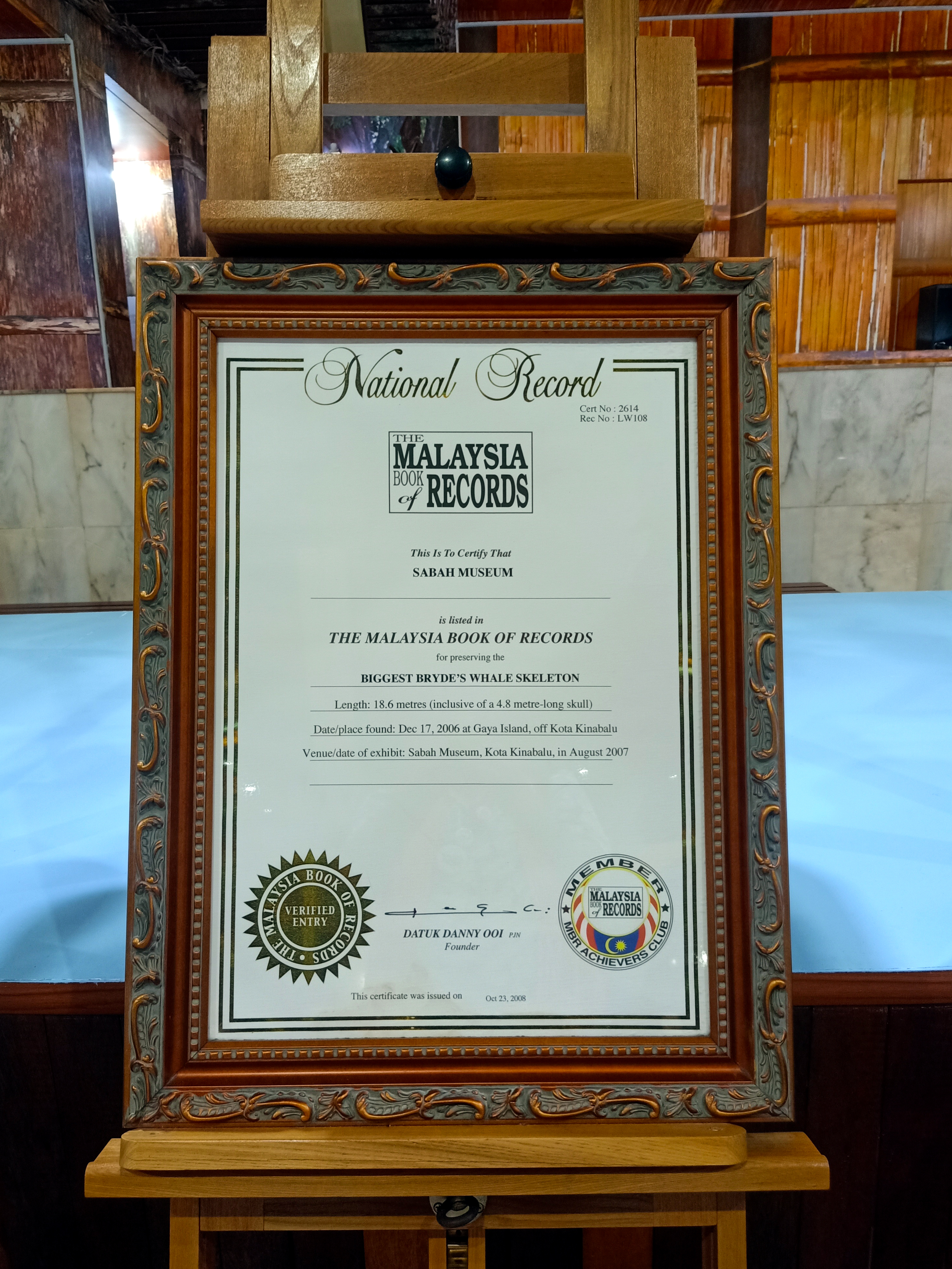
Biggest whale skeleton exhibited in Malaysia according to The Malaysia Book of Records

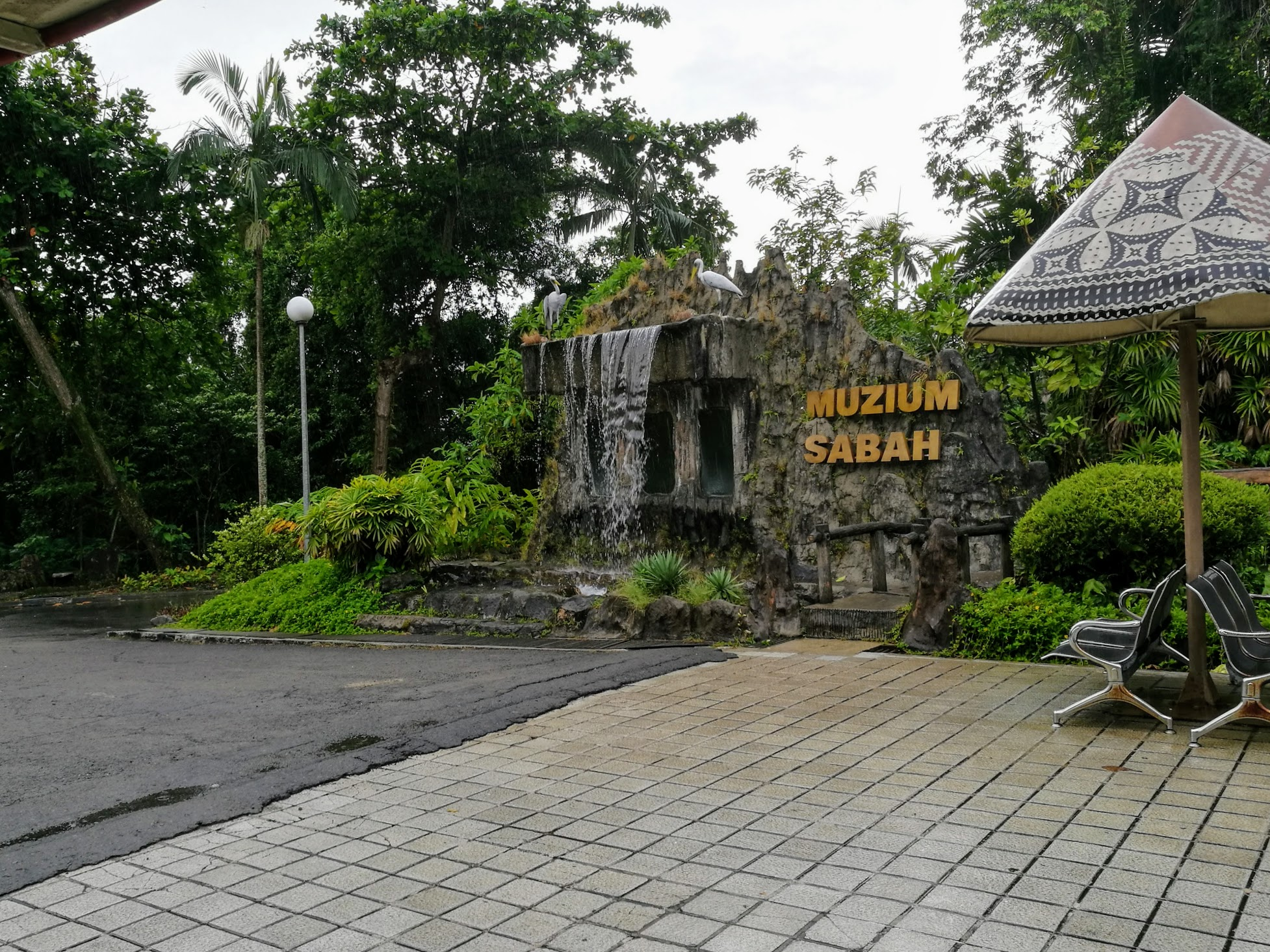
The museum entrance waterfall.

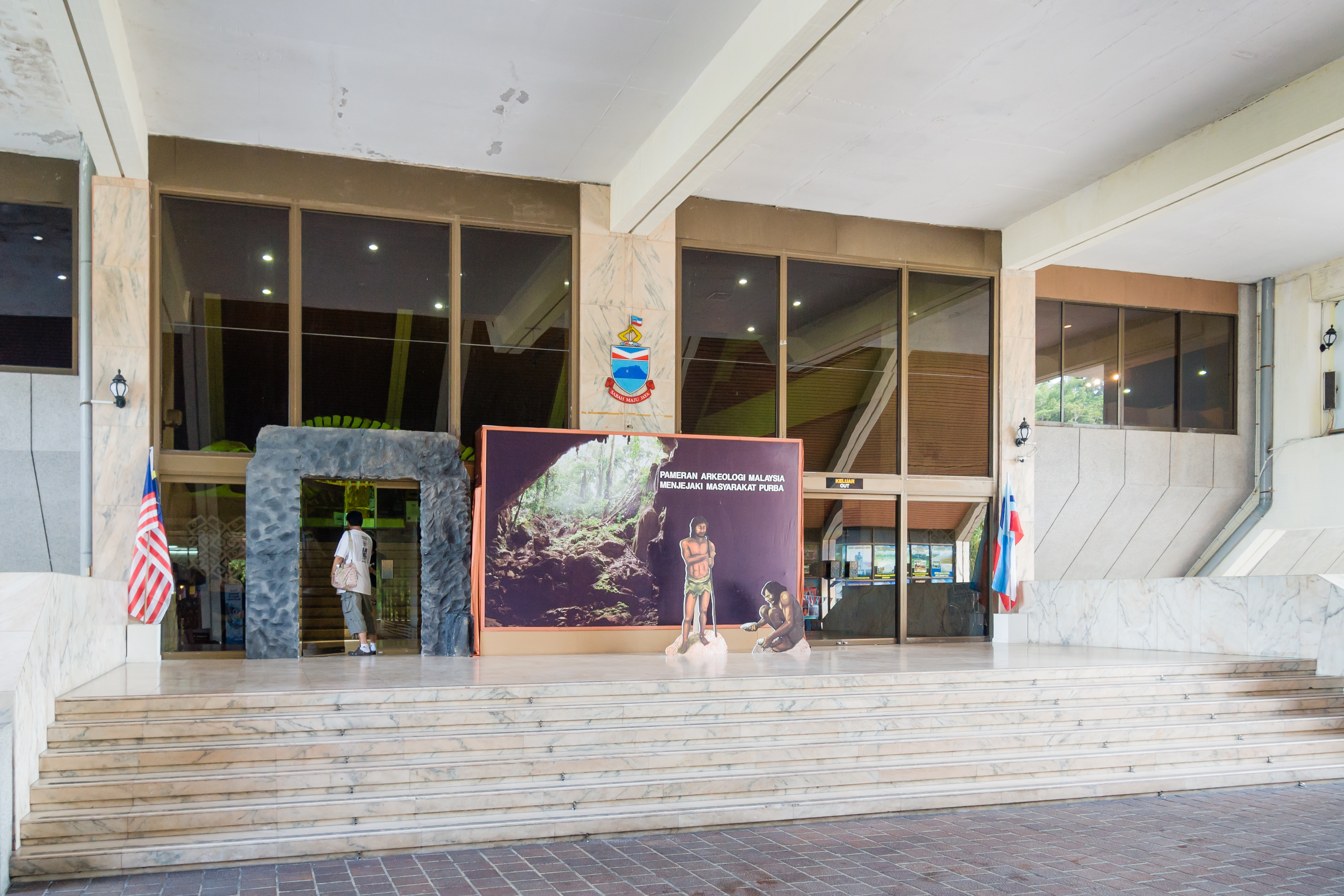
The museum main entrance.

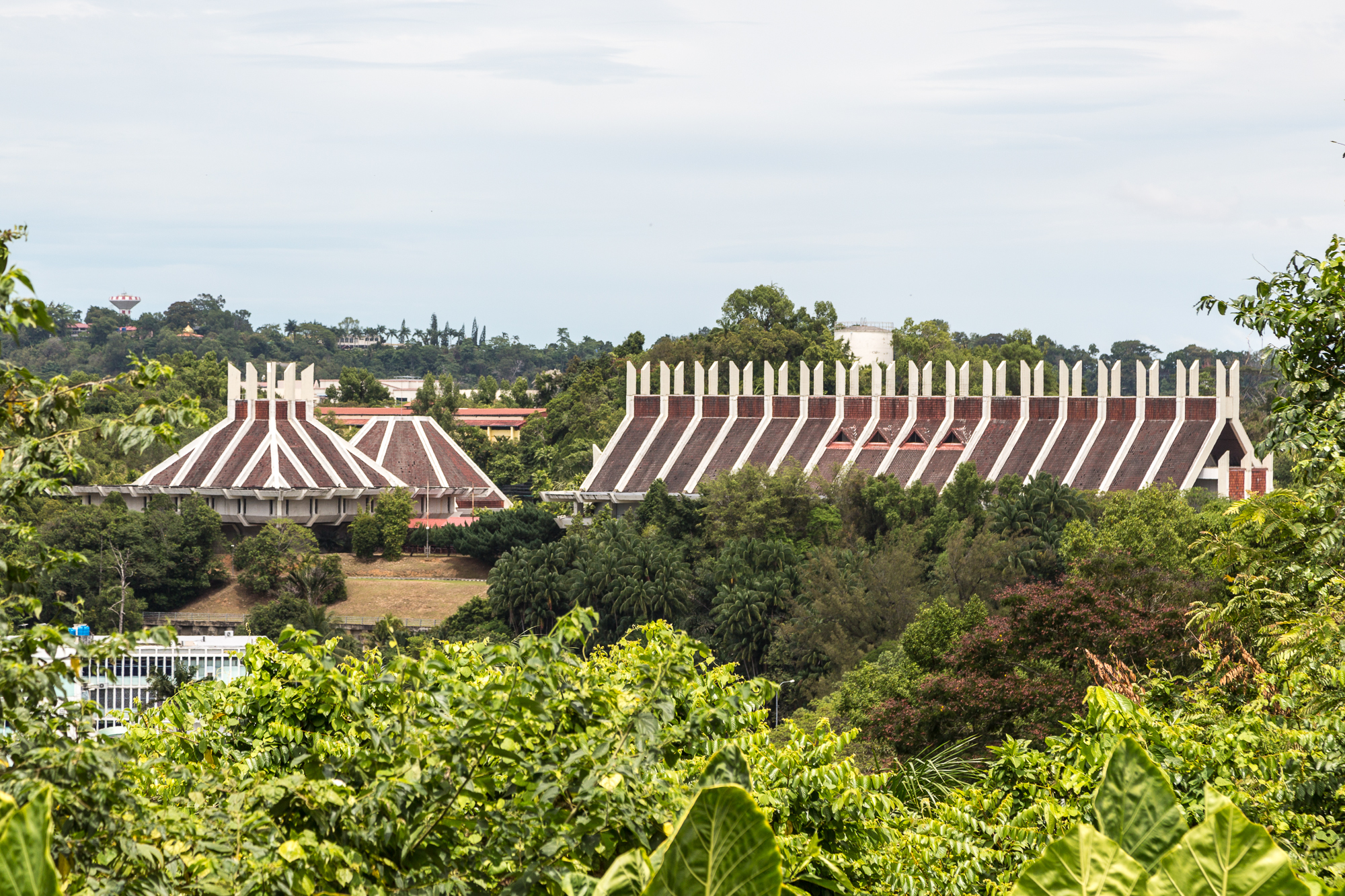
The museum seen afar.

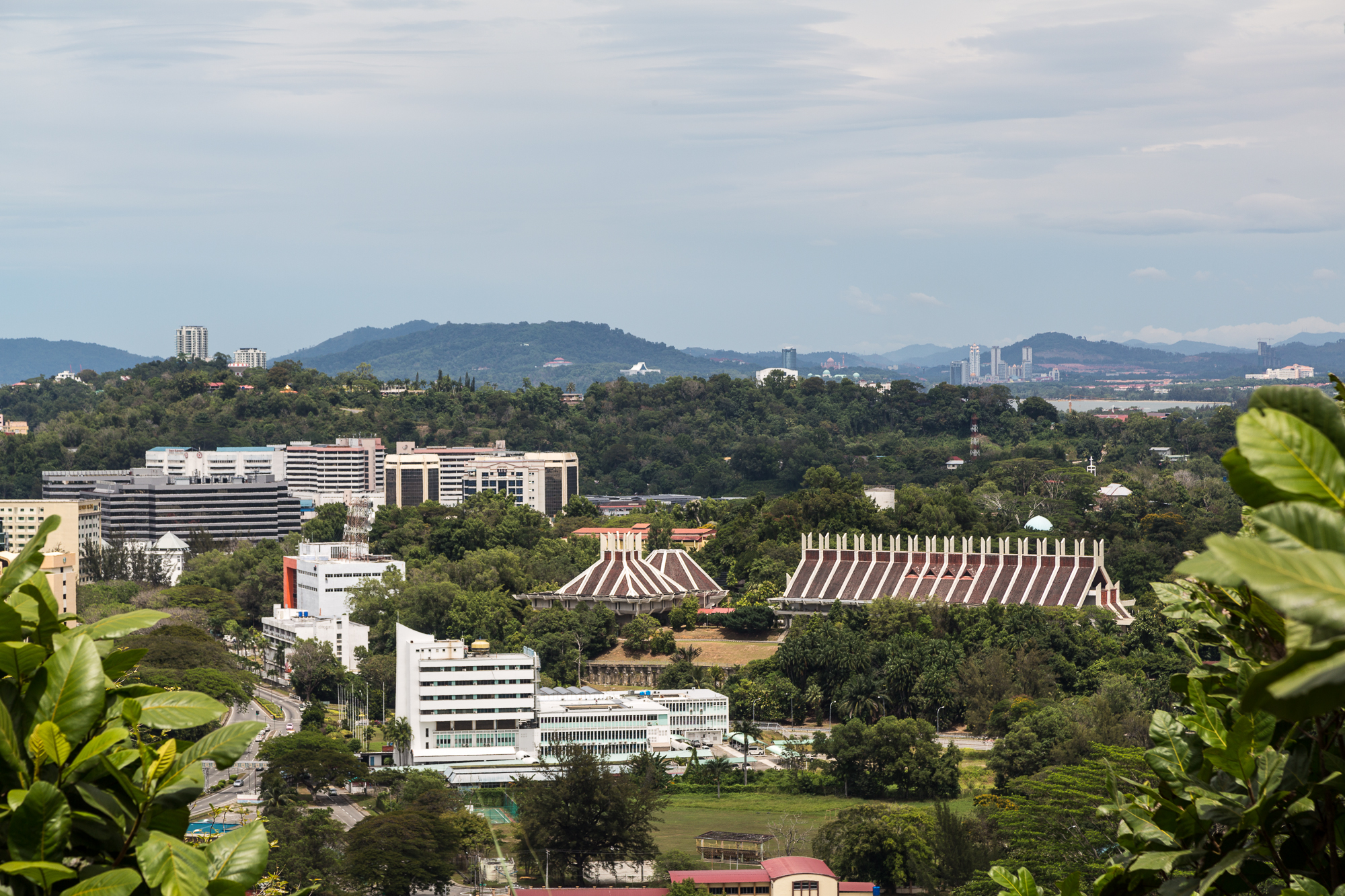
Remote views of Sabah Museum.

== See also ==
- List of museums in Malaysia
