= Thomas Cecil Alexander =

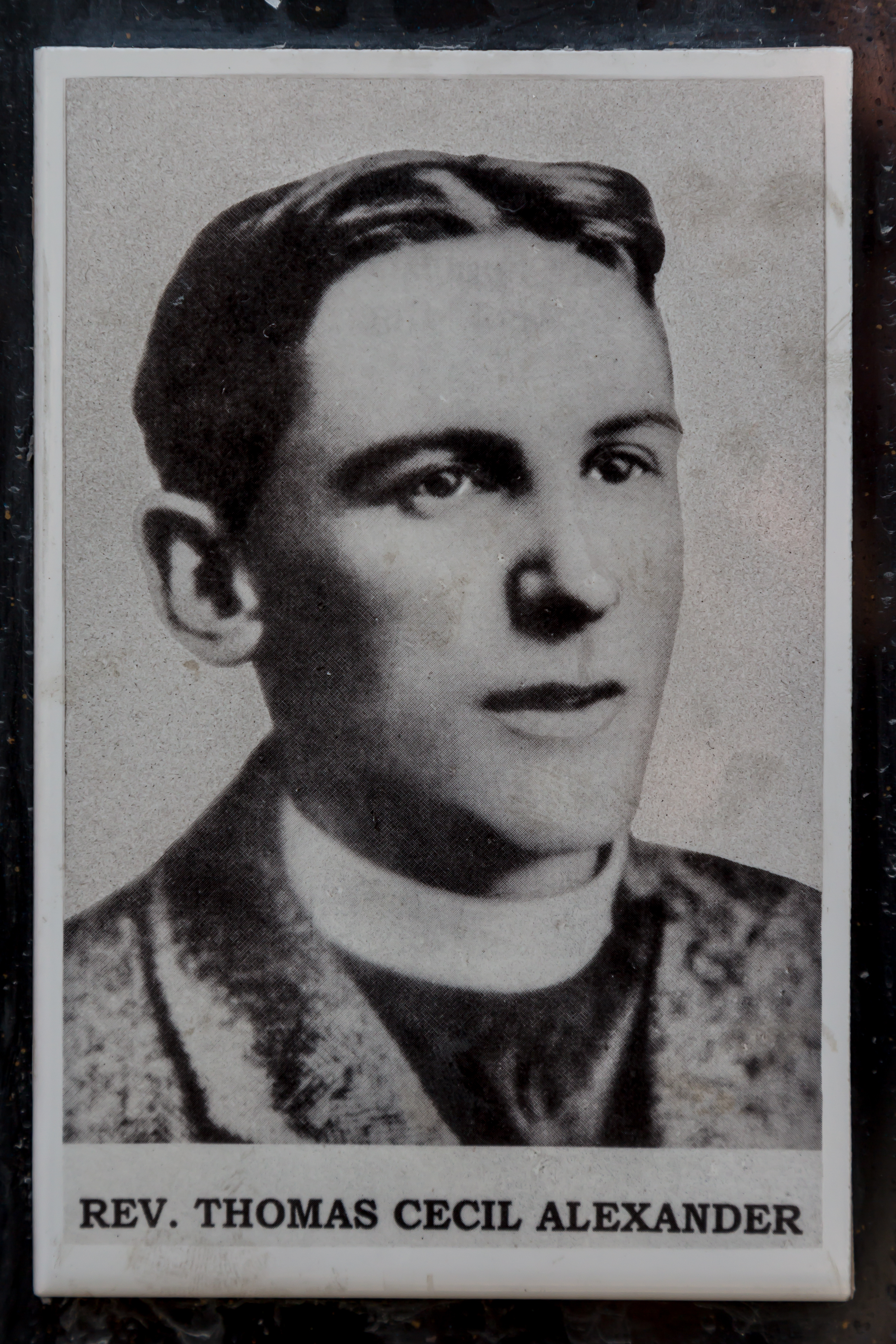
- Born: 5 February 1884; Watton, Norfolk, England
- Died: 4 August 1968 (aged 84)
- Occupation: Priest
- Known for: Scouting

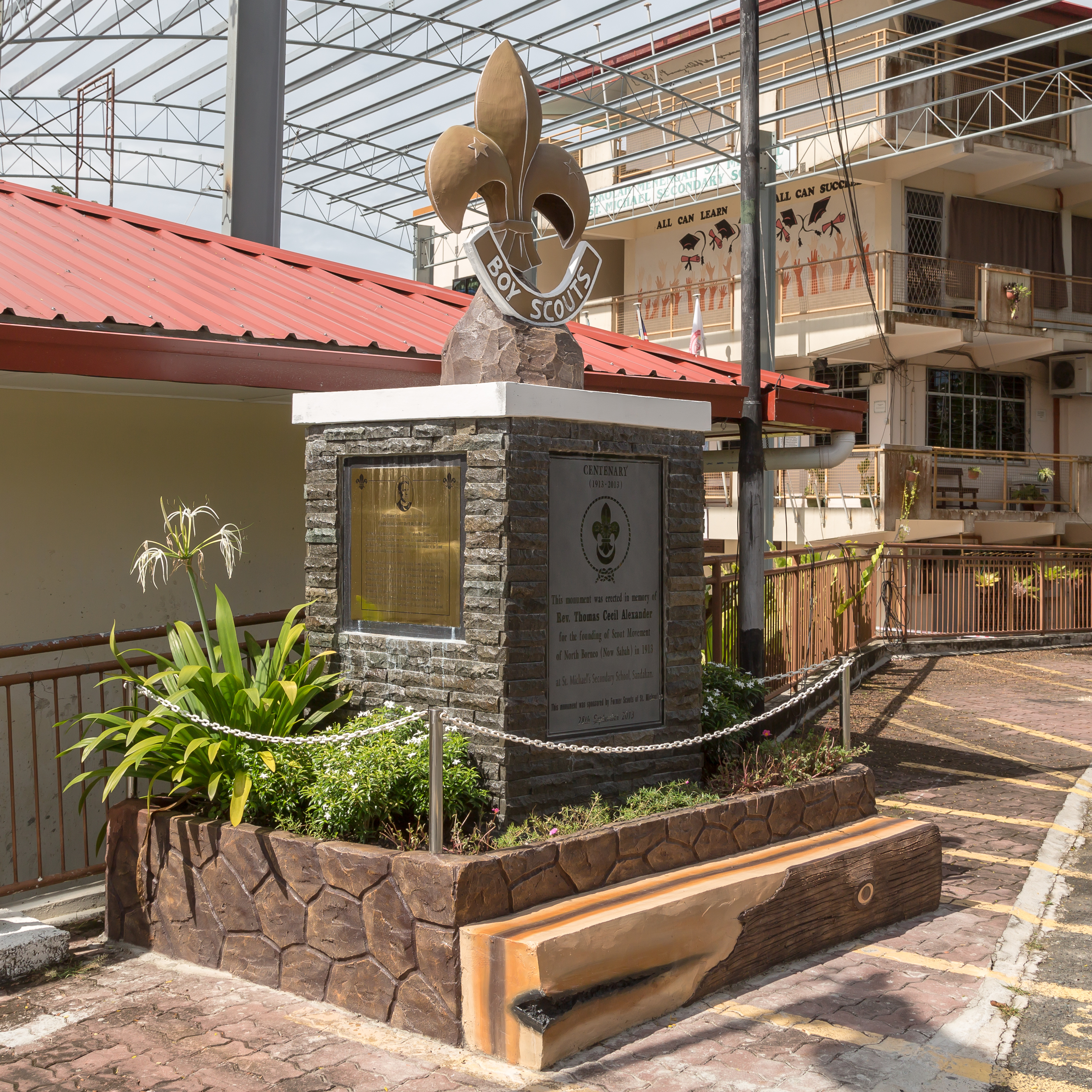
North Borneo Scout Movement Monument in Sandakan, Sabah

Thomas Cecil Alexander (5 February 1884 – 4 August 1968) was an Anglican priest and missionary in British Malaya, the founder of the Scouting movement in what is now the Malaysian state of Sabah.

Alexander was born in Watton in Norfolk, where his father was a doctor. After graduating from university, he was ordained in Norwich in 1909 and was a curate in Methwold.

In 1912 he joined the Anglican mission at St. Thomas' Cathedral in Kuching, in Sarawak, where he was assistant to the Bishop, Rupert Mounsey. In 1913 he became the priest in charge at Sandakan, then the capital of British North Borneo, where he worked particularly among the Chinese and introduced Scouting. He is also sometimes credited with introducing Scouting in Sarawak.

He retired in 1955 and lived at Cromer; he died at 84 in 1968.

He was awarded the Medal of Merit by the Boy Scouts Association. The North Borneo Scout Movement Monument, unveiled on 28 September 2013 at St. Michael's Secondary School in Sandakan, commemorates the centenary of his introduction of Scouting there in 1913.

== See also ==
- Christianity in Malaysia
- Persekutuan Pengakap Malaysia
