= Sabah Art Gallery =

Art gallery in Kota Kinabalu, Sabah, Malaysia

Coordinates: 5°57′11.3″N 116°04′53.0″E

- Balai Seni Lukis Sabah
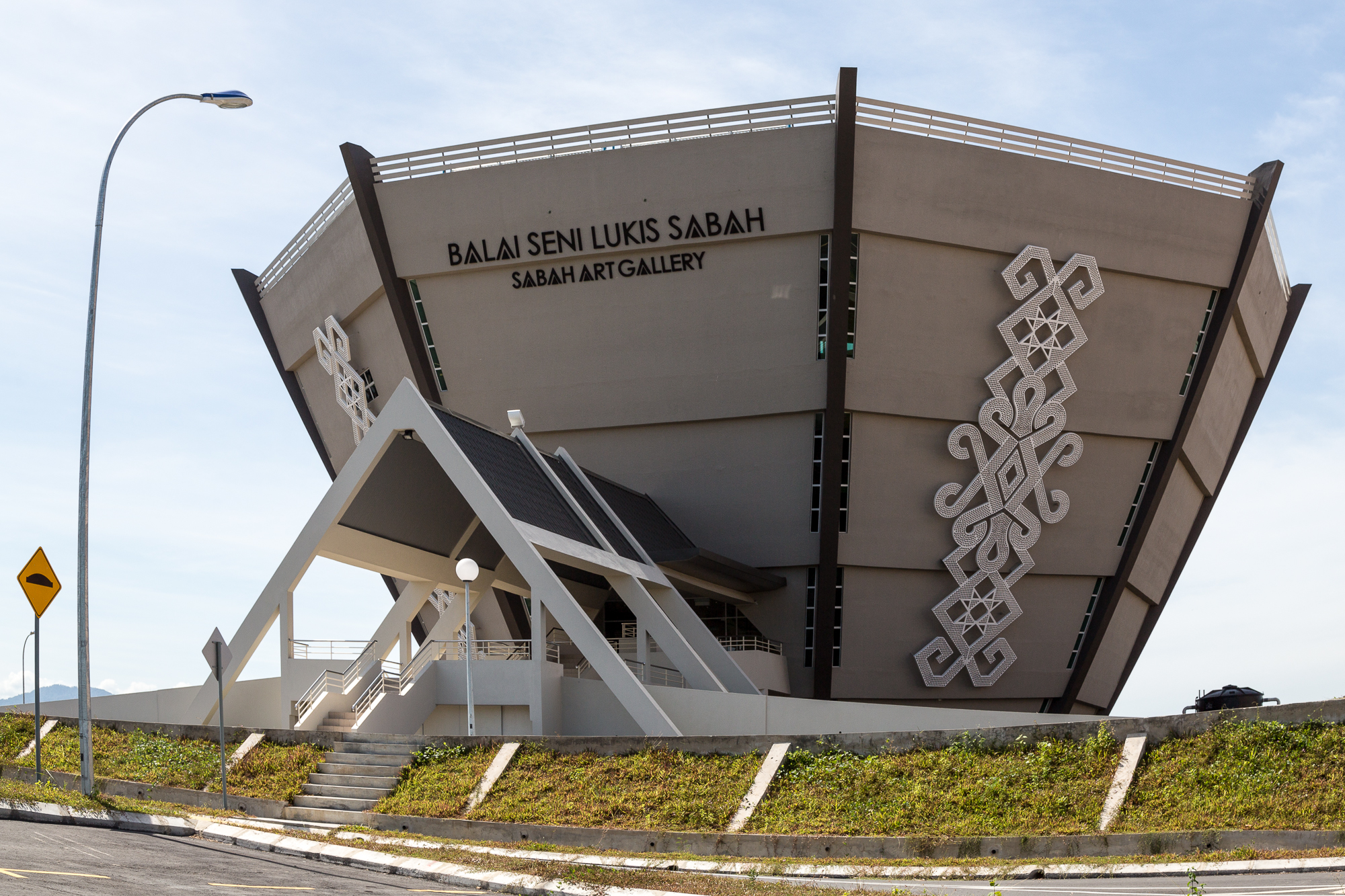
- Interactive map of the Sabah Art Gallery area

General information
- Type: art gallery
- Location: Kota Kinabalu, Sabah, Malaysia
- Opened: 1984
- Cost: MYR16 million

The Sabah Art Gallery (BSLS; Malay: Balai Seni Lukis Sabah) is an art gallery in Kota Kinabalu, Sabah, Malaysia.

== History ==
The art gallery was founded in 1984 by Datuk Mohd. Yaman Hj. Ahmad Mus. In 2012, it was certified as green building by Green Building Index Accreditation Panel. On 9 November 2013, Sabah Chief Minister Musa Aman officiated the conservation centre building of the art gallery in conjunction with the 50th anniversary of Sabah accession into the federation of Malaysia.

== Architecture ==
The art gallery building is located on a 1.7 hectares of land with an octagonal basket-shaped building. It was constructed with a cost of MYR16 million.

== Exhibitions ==
The building consists of two gallery spaces. The permanent exhibition of the art gallery houses more than 3,000 art works by local and international artists with a total estimated value of around more than MYR10 million. The temporary gallery houses various exhibitions.

== Events ==
Besides exhibitions, the gallery regularly hosts workshops, seminars, competitions etc.

== See also ==
- List of tourist attractions in Malaysia
