= List of World Organization of the Scout Movement members =

Map of member organizations

The World Organization of the Scout Movement (WOSM /ˈwʊzəm/) is the largest international scout organization and was established in 1922. It has 176 members. These members are national scout organizations that founded WOSM or have subsequently been recognised by WOSM, which collectively have around 43 million participants.

== Table of members ==
WOSM recognizes only one Scout organization per country. Some countries have several organizations combined as a federation, with different component groups divided on the basis of religion (e.g., France and Denmark), ethnic identification (e.g., Israel), or language (e.g., Belgium). Canada is the only country to have two distinct recognized associations, which are divided by language. About 30 WOSM members are also members of the World Association of Girl Guides and Girl Scouts, mostly from Europe and Arab countries.

Country	Membership (from 2019)	Name of member organization	Year current Scouting organization joined WOSM	Year member organization was founded	Admits boys/girls
Afghanistan	12,475	Afghanistan Scout Association	2020	1931	both
Albania	599	Scouts of Albania	2024	2021	both
Algeria	61,860	Scouts Musulmans Algériens	1963	1934	both
Angola	28,011	Associação de Escuteiros de Angola	1998	1998	both
Antigua and Barbuda	105	Antigua and Barbuda Scout Association	2022	1917	both
Argentina	77,040	Scouts de Argentina	1922	1912	both
Armenia	1,921	Hayastani Azgayin Scautakan Sharjum Kazmakerputiun	1997	1912	both
Aruba	477	Scouting Aruba	2016	2000	both
Australia	65,833	Scouts Australia	1953 (predecessor)	1958	both
Austria	27,210	Pfadfinder und Pfadfinderinnen Österreichs	1922/1946	1912	both
Azerbaijan	1,796	Azərbaycan Skaut Assosiasiyasi	2000	1997	both
Bahamas	1,134	The Scout Association of the Bahamas	1974	1913	both
Bahrain	2,286	Boy Scouts of Bahrain	1970	1953	boys only
Bangladesh	2,070,376	Bangladesh Scouts	1974	1972	both
Barbados	2,169	Barbados Boy Scouts Association	1969	1912	boys only
Belarus	1,182	Belarusian Republican Scout Association	1989	1909	both
Belgium	109,606	Guides and Scouts Movement of Belgium (federation of several organizations)	1922	1911	both
Belize	402	The Scout Association of Belize	1987	1911	both
Benin	7,776	Scoutisme Béninois	1964	1932	both
Bhutan	61,300	Bhutan Scout Tshogpa	1999	1991	both
Bolivia	6,118	Asociación de Scouts de Bolivia	1950	1915	both
Bosnia and Herzegovina	2,493	Savez izviđača Bosne i Hercegovine	1999	1999/2011	both
Botswana	19,242	The Botswana Scouts Association	1958	1936	boys only
Brazil	114,588	União dos Escoteiros do Brasil	1922	1910	both
Brunei	1,256	Persekutuan Pengakap Negara Brunei Darussalam	1981	1933	both
Bulgaria	510	Organizatsia Na Bulgarskite Skauty	1999	1911–1913	both
Burkina Faso	7,674	Fédération Burkinabé du Scoutisme (federation of several organizations)	1972	1943	both
Burundi	71,420	Association des Scouts du Burundi	1979	1940	both
Cambodia	58,050	National Association of Cambodian Scouts	2008	2000	both
Cameroon	16,872	Les Scouts du Cameroun	1971	1937	both
Canada	86,012	Scouts Canada, with which is affiliated the Association des Scouts du Canada	1946	1914	both
Cape Verde	347	Associação dos Escuteiros de Cabo Verde	2002	2002	NA
Chad	14,500	Fédération du Scoutisme Tchadien (federation of several organizations)	1974	1960	both
Chile	28,825	Asociación de Guías y Scouts de Chile	1922/1974	1909	both
Colombia	15,209	Asociación Scouts de Colombia	1933	1917	both
Comoros	3,268	Wezombeli	1990	1975	both
Costa Rica	18,339	Asociación de Guías y Scouts de Costa Rica	1925	1915	both
Croatia	3,483	Savez izviđača Hrvatske	1993	1915	both
Curaçao; Sint Maarten; Caribbean Netherlands	1,143	Scouting Antiano	2016	1997	both
Cyprus	5,522	Cyprus Scouts Association	1961	1913	both
Czech Republic	67,959	Junák - český skaut, z. s.	1922/1990/1996	1911	both
Democratic Republic of the Congo	141,338	Fédération des Scouts de la République démocratique du Congo	1963	1924	both
Denmark	50,644	Fællesrådet for Danmarks Drengespejdere (federation of several organizations)	1922	1909	both
Dominica	455	The Scout Association of Dominica	1990	1929	both
Dominican Republic	2,354	Asociación de Scouts Dominicanos	1930	1926	both
East Timor	6,342	União Nacional dos Escuteiros de Timor Leste	2017	2003	both
Ecuador	10,315	Asociación de Scouts del Ecuador	1922	1920	both
Egypt	71,999	Egyptian Federation for Scouts and Girl Guides (federation of several organizations)	1922	1914	both
El Salvador	2,440	Asociación de Scouts de El Salvador	1940	1938	both
Estonia	1,185	Eesti Skautide Ühing	1922/1996	1911/1989	both
Eswatini	5,280	Eswatini Scout Association	1968	1928	boys only
Ethiopia	104,478	Ethiopia Scout Association	2002	1950	both
Fiji	9,424	Fiji Scouts Association	1971	1914	both
Finland	55,077	Suomen Partiolaiset - Finlands Scouter ry	1922	1910	both
France	101,480	Scoutisme Français (federation of several organizations)	1922	1910	both
Gabon	3,736	Fédération Gabonaise du Scoutisme (federation of several organizations)	1971	1936	both
Gambia	15,564	The Gambia Scout Association	1984	1921	both
Georgia	2,759	Sakartvelos Skauturi Modzraobis Organizatsia	1997	1994	both
Germany	124,779	Ring deutscher Pfadfinder*innenverbände (federation of several organizations)	1950	1910	both
Ghana	13,496	The Ghana Scout Association	1960	1912	both
Greece	16,694	Soma Hellinon Proskopon	1922	1910	both
Grenada	1,367	The Scout Association of Grenada	1979	1924	both
Guatemala	5,506	Asociación de Scouts de Guatemala	1930	1928	both
Guinea	11,520	Association Nationale des Scouts de Guinée	1990/2005	1984	NA
Guinea-Bissau	9,698	Escuteiros da Guiné-Bissau	2017	1966	both
Guyana	546	The Scout Association of Guyana	1967	1909	both
Haiti	43,605	Scouts d'Haïti	1932/1940	1916	both
Honduras	1,935	Asociación de Scouts de Honduras	1957	1952	both
Hong Kong	100,643	The Scout Association of Hong Kong	1977	1914	both
Hungary	12,516	Magyar Cserkészszövetség	1922/1990	1912	both
Iceland	1,738	Bandalag Íslenskra Skáta	1924	1912	both
India	3,581,332	The Bharat Scouts and Guides	1938	1909	both
Indonesia	24,756,268	Gerakan Pramuka	1961	1912	both
Iraq	13,128	Iraq Scout Association	1922/1956/2017	1914	both
Ireland	48,478	Scouting Ireland	1949	1908	both
Israel	90,356	Hitachdut Hatsofim Ve Hatsofot Be Israel (federation of several organizations)	1951	1919	both
Italy	103,276	Federazione Italiana dello Scautismo (federation of several organizations)	1922/1946	1912	both
Ivory Coast	21,494	Fédération Ivoirienne du Scoutisme (federation of several organizations)	1972	1937	both
Jamaica	1,386	The Scout Association of Jamaica	1963	1910	both
Japan	91,827	Scout Association of Japan	1922/1950	1913	both
Jordan	31,765	Jordanian Association for Boy Scouts and Girl Guides	1955	1954	both
Kazakhstan	1,010	Organization of the Scout Movement of Kazakhstan	2008	1992	both
Kenya	2,145,640	The Kenya Scouts Association	1964	1910	both
Kiribati	1,186	Kiribati Scout Association	1993	1993	both
South Korea	90,610	Korea Scout Association	1953	1922	both
Kuwait	6,215	Kuwait Boy Scouts Association	1955	1952	boys only
Latvia	804	Latvijas Skautu un Gaidu Centrālā Organizācija	1993	1917	both
Lebanon	18,140	Lebanese Scouting Federation (federation of several organizations)	1947	1912	both
Lesotho	2,044	Lesotho Scouts Association	1971	1936	boys only
Liberia	7,841	Boy Scouts of Liberia	1922/1965	1922	boys only
Libya	24,775	Public Scout and Girl Guide Movement	1958	1954	both
Liechtenstein	738	Pfadfinder und Pfadfinderinnen Liechtensteins	1933	1931	both
Lithuania	3,000	Lietuvos Skautija	1997	1918	both
Luxembourg	7,902	Scouting in Luxembourg (federation of several organizations)	1922	1914	both
Macau	2,373	Associação de Escoteiros de Macau	2017	1921	both
Madagascar	50,041	Firaisan'ny Skotisma eto Madagasikara (federation of several organizations)	1960	1921	both
Malawi	101,610	The Scout Association of Malawi	2005	1996	NA
Malaysia	117,391	Persekutuan Pengakap Malaysia	1957	1911	both
Maldives	10,726	The Scout Association of Maldives	1990	1963	both
Mali	5000+	Association des Scouts et Guides du Mali	2024	2022	both
Malta	3,639	The Scout Association of Malta	1966	1908	both
Mauritania	3,724	Association des Scouts et Guides de Mauritanie	1983	1947	both
Mauritius	2,388	The Mauritius Scout Association	1971	1912	both
Mexico	44,731	Asociación de Scouts de México, A.C.	1926	1920	both
Moldova	363	Organizaţia Naţionala A Scouţilor Din Moldova	1997	1921	both
Monaco	133	Association des Guides et Scouts de Monaco	1990	1990	both
Mongolia	9,799	Mongolyn Skautyn Kholboo	1994	1992	both
Montenegro	1,738	Savez Izviđača Crne Gore	2008	2006	both
Morocco	12,304	Fédération Nationale du Scoutisme Marocain	1961	1933	both
Mozambique	8,692	Liga dos Escuteiros de Moçambique	1999	1960	both
Myanmar	16,930	Myanmar Scout	2016	2012	both
Namibia	3,909	Scouts of Namibia	1990	1917	both
Nepal	49,152	Nepal Scouts	1969	1952	both
Netherlands	115,000	Scouting Nederland	1922	1910	both
New Zealand	18,724	Scouts Aotearoa New Zealand	1953	1922	both
Nicaragua	1,337	Asociación de Scouts de Nicaragua	1946	1917	both
Niger	3,300	Association des Scouts du Niger	1996	1947	both
Nigeria	750,073	Scout Association of Nigeria	1961	1915	both
North Macedonia	2,787	Sojuz na Izvidnici na Makedonija	1997	1921	both
Norway	17,261	Speiderne i Norge (federation of several organizations)	1922	1911	both
Oman	35,281	The National Organisation for Scouts and Guides	1977	1948	both
Pakistan	703,050	Pakistan Boy Scouts Association	1948	1947	boys only
Palestine	81,082	Palestinian Scout Association	2016	1912	both
Panama	2,259	Asociación Nacional de Scouts de Panamá	1924/1950	1924	both
Papua New Guinea	5,487	The Scout Association of Papua New Guinea	1976	1926	boys only
Paraguay	1,234	Asociación de Scouts del Paraguay	1962	1960	both
Peru	8,254	Asociación de Scouts del Perú	1922	1916	both
Philippines	2,808,881	Boy Scouts of the Philippines	1946	1936	both
Poland	142,692	Związek Harcerstwa Polskiego	1922/1996	1918	both
Portugal	78,440	Federação Escotista de Portugal	1922	1913	both
Qatar	6,316	The Scout and Guide Association of Qatar	1965	1955	both
Republic of the Congo	17,466	Scoutisme Congolais	2023	1930s/1991	both
Romania	6,495	Cercetaşii României	1993	1914	both
Russia	2,035	All-Russian Scout Association	2004	1909	both
Rwanda	49,374	Rwanda Scouts Association	1975	1940	both
Saint Lucia	355	The Saint Lucia Scout Association	1990	1910	both
Saint Vincent and the Grenadines	211	The Scout Association of Saint Vincent and the Grenadines	1990	1911	both
San Marino	269	Associazione Guide Esploratori Cattolici Sammarinesi	1990/2017	1973	both
São Tomé and Príncipe	1,398	Associação dos Escuteiros de São Tomé e Príncipe	2017	1993	both
Saudi Arabia	18,737	Saudi Arabian Boy Scouts Association	1963	1961	both
Senegal	5,297	Confédération Sénégalaise du Scoutisme (federation of several organizations)	1963	1930	both
Serbia	4,897	Savez Izviđača Srbije	1995	1911	both
Seychelles	274	Seychelles Scout Association	1927	2002	both
Sierra Leone	20,658	Sierra Leone Scouts Association	1964	1909	both
Singapore	12,526	The Singapore Scout Association	1966	1910	both
Slovakia	7,632	Slovenský skauting	1922/1990/1997	1913	both
Slovenia	6,855	Zveza tabornikov Slovenije	1994	1915	both
Solomon Islands	500	Solomon Islands Scout Association	2021	1928	both
South Africa	97,910	Scouts South Africa	1937	1908	both
South Sudan	11,300	South Sudan Scout Association	2013	2011	both
Spain	72,669	Federación de Escultismo en España	1922/1978	1912	both
Sri Lanka	66,847	Sri Lanka Scout Association	1953	1912	both
Sudan	14,682	Sudan Scouts Association	1956	1935	boys only
Suriname	756	Boy Scouts van Suriname	1968	1924	both
Sweden	39,763	Scouterna	1922	1911	both
Switzerland	25,554	Swiss Guide and Scout Movement	1922	1912	both
Syria	9,260	Scouts of Syria	2008	1912/1949	both
Taiwan	56,081	Scouts of China	1937	1912	both
Tajikistan	563	Ittihodi Scouthoi Tojikiston	1997	1991	both
Tanzania	538,933	Tanzania Scouts Association	1963	1929	both
Thailand	751,927	The National Scout Organization of Thailand	1922	1911	both
Togo	10,676	Association Scoute du Togo	1977	1920	both
Trinidad and Tobago	2,101	The Scout Association of Trinidad and Tobago	1963	1911	both
Tunisia	29,105	Les Scouts Tunisiens	1957	1933	both
Turkey	223,417	Türkiye İzcilik Federasyonu	1950	1923	both
Uganda	116,054	The Uganda Scouts Association	1964	1915	both
Ukraine	1,417	National Organization of Scouts of Ukraine	2008	2007	both
United Arab Emirates	3,968	Emirates Scout Association	1977	1972	boys only
United Kingdom	637,185	The Scout Association	1922	1910	both
United States	2,744,682	Scouting America	1922	1910	both
Uruguay	2,044	Movimiento Scout del Uruguay	1950	1946	both
Venezuela	9,904	Asociación de Scouts de Venezuela	1937	1913	both
Vietnam	6,209	Pathfinder Scouts Vietnam	2019	1930	both
Yemen	7,095	Yemen Scouts and Guides Association - Scout branch	1980	1927	boys only
Zambia	15,271	Zambia Scouts Association	1965	1930	both
Zimbabwe	17,841	The Scout Association of Zimbabwe	1980	1909	both

== Non-sovereign territories with independent WOSM member organizations ==
- Hong Kong - The Scout Association of Hong Kong: Full Member of the World Organization of the Scout Movement
- Aruba - Scouting Aruba: Full Member of the World Organization of the Scout Movement
- French Polynesia - Conseil du Scoutisme polynésien: Associate Member of the Asia-Pacific Region of the World Organization of the Scout Movement
- Macau - Associação de Escoteiros de Macau: Full Member of the World Organization of the Scout Movement
- Curaçao, Sint Maarten and the Caribbean Netherlands (former Netherlands Antilles) - Scouting Antiano: Full Member of the World Organization of the Scout Movement

== Countries and territories with Scouting run by overseas branches of WOSM member organizations ==
Ten of these overseas branches of accredited National Scout Organizations are considered "potential members" by the WOSM (marked by *).

=== Sovereign countries ===
==== Served by Scouting America ====
- Federated States of Micronesia - Scouting in the Federated States of Micronesia* - Aloha Council of Scouting America
- Marshall Islands - Scouting in the Marshall Islands* - Aloha Council of Scouting America
- Palau - Scouting in Palau* - Aloha Council of Scouting America

==== Served by The Scout Association (UK) ====
- Saint Kitts and Nevis - The Scout Association of Saint Kitts and Nevis*
- Tonga - Tonga branch of The Scout Association*
- Tuvalu - Tuvalu Scout Association*
- Vanuatu - Vanuatu branch of The Scout Association*

==== Served by Scouts Australia ====
- Nauru - Scouting in Nauru*

=== Non-sovereign territories ===
==== Australia ====
- Christmas Island - Scouts Australia
- Cocos (Keeling) Islands - Scouts Australia
- Norfolk Island - Scouts Australia

==== Denmark ====
- Faroe Islands - Føroya Skótaráð
- Greenland - Grønlands Spejderkorps

==== France ====
- French Guiana - Scouting in French Guiana
- Guadeloupe and Saint Martin - Scouting in Guadeloupe et Saint Martin
- Martinique - Scouts et Guides de Martinique
- Mayotte - Scouting in Mayotte
- New Caledonia - Scouting in New Caledonia
- Réunion - Scouting on Réunion
- Saint Pierre and Miquelon - Scouting in Saint Pierre and Miquelon
- Wallis and Futuna - Scouting in Wallis and Futuna

==== New Zealand ====
- Cook Islands - Cook Islands Boy Scout Association
- Niue - Scouting and Guiding on Niue
- Tokelau - Scouting and Guiding in Tokelau

==== United Kingdom ====
- Anguilla - The Scout Association of Anguilla
- Bermuda - Bermuda Scout Association
- Cayman Islands - The Scout Association of the Cayman Islands
- Falkland Islands - Scouting and Guiding in the Falkland Islands
- Gibraltar - The Scout Association of Gibraltar
- Montserrat - The Scout Association of Montserrat
- Saint Helena and Ascension Island - Scouting and Guiding on Saint Helena and Ascension Island
- Turks and Caicos Islands - The Scout Association of the Turks and Caicos
- British Virgin Islands - The Scout Association of the British Virgin Islands

==== United States ====
- American Samoa - Scouting in American Samoa - Aloha Council of Scouting America
- Guam - Scouting in Guam - Aloha Council of Scouting America
- Northern Marianas Islands - Scouting in the Northern Mariana Islands - Aloha Council of Scouting America
- Puerto Rico - Puerto Rico Council of Scouting America
- United States Virgin Islands - Scouting in the United States Virgin Islands is the responsibility of National Capital Area Council of Scouting America

== 'Potential member countries' listed by WOSM ==
In 2020, WOSM listed 25 sovereign countries as potential members. 10 of these were served by oversea branches of WOSM member organizations (see #Countries and territories with Scouting run by overseas branches of WOSM member organizations).

- Central African Republic - Fédération du scoutisme centrafricain
- Djibouti - Association des Scouts de Djibouti
- Equatorial Guinea - Scouting in Equatorial Guinea
- Eritrea - National Scout Association of Eritrea
- Iran - Iran Scout Organization
- Kyrgyzstan - Scouting in Kyrgyzstan
- Samoa - Scouting in Samoa
- Somalia - Scouting in Somalia
- Turkmenistan - Scouting in Turkmenistan
- Uzbekistan - Scouting in Uzbekistan

== Countries with no Scouting organization ==
In 2020, WOSM listed five sovereign countries as without Scouting; the list omitted Vatican City, which is also without Scouting.

- Andorra - Scouting and Guiding in Andorra - reactivated in 2016
- People's Republic of China (mainland China) - Scouting in Mainland China - Scout Association of the People's Republic of China
- Cuba - Cuban Scouting prior to 1961 and in exile [Note:one new Scout group, in a Catholic church in Santiago de Cuba since early 2012]
- Laos - Laotian Scouting prior to 1975 and in exile[Laotian Scouting in exile existed at least into the early 1990s in Los Angeles and Birmingham. Actually, a small remnant persists in Sacramento and San Pablo, alongside fellow Vietnamese Scouting in exile and Cambodian Scouting in exile groups.]
- North Korea - shared history with Korea Scout Association prior to 1950
- Vatican City - Scouting in Vatican City

== Other status ==
- Antarctica - Scouting in the Antarctic
- Kosovo - Scouting in Kosovo - partially recognized state
- Somaliland - Scouting in Somaliland - self-proclaimed unrecognized functional state within Somalia
- Western Sahara - Scouting in Western Sahara

== See also ==
- List of World Association of Girl Guides and Girl Scouts members
