= Scouting and Guiding in Antigua and Barbuda =

Scouting and Guiding movement in Antigua and Barbuda

The Scout and Guide movement in Antigua and Barbuda is served by

- Antigua and Barbuda Scout Association, member of the World Organization of the Scout Movement
- The Girl Guides Association of Antigua and Barbuda, member of the World Association of Girl Guides and Girl Scouts.
