= Scouting and Guiding in the Gambia =

Scouting and Guiding associations in the Gambia

The Scout and Guide movement in the Gambia is served by

- The Gambia Girl Guides Association, member of the World Association of Girl Guides and Girl Scouts
- The Gambia Scout Association, member of the World Organization of the Scout Movement
