= Scouting and Guiding in Dominica =

Scouting and Guiding movement in Dominica

The Scout and Guide movement in Dominica (an island nation in the Lesser Antilles region of the Caribbean Sea) is served by

- The Girl Guides Association of Dominica, member of the World Association of Girl Guides and Girl Scouts
- The Scout Association of Dominica, member of the World Organization of the Scout Movement
