= Caribbean Link for Guiding =

Association of Girl Guides

The Caribbean Link for Guiding is a consortium of 21 Girl Guide Associations from throughout the Caribbean. These include associations from independent countries as well as from British Overseas Territories, coordinated by Girlguiding UK. It was created in 1958.

== Members ==
- Anguilla - Girlguiding Anguilla, a branch association of Girlguiding UK
- Antigua and Barbuda - The Girl Guides Association of Antigua and Barbuda
- Aruba - Het Arubaanse Padvindsters Gilde
- Bahamas - The Bahamas Girl Guides Association
- Barbados - The Girl Guides Association of Barbados
- Belize - The Girl Guides Association of Belize
- Bermuda - Girlguiding Bermuda, a branch association of Girlguiding UK
- British Virgin Islands - The British Virgin Islands Girl Guide Association, a branch association of Girlguiding UK
- Cayman Islands - Girlguiding Cayman Islands, a branch association of Girlguiding UK
- Dominica - The Girl Guides Association of Dominica
- Grenada - The Girl Guides Association of Grenada
- Guyana - Guyana Girl Guides Association
- Jamaica - The Girl Guides Association of Jamaica
- Montserrat - Girlguiding Montserrat, a branch association of Girlguiding UK
- Netherlands Antilles - Padvindstersvereniging van de Nederlandse Antillen
- Saint Kitts and Nevis - The Girl Guides Association of Saint Christopher and Nevis
- Saint Lucia - Girl Guides Association of Saint Lucia
- Saint Vincent and the Grenadines - Girl Guides Association of Saint Vincent and the Grenadines
- Trinidad and Tobago - The Girl Guides Association of Trinidad and Tobago
- Turks and Caicos - Turks and Caicos Islands branch of Girlguiding UK

== History ==
The Federal Link of the Girl Guides Associations of the West Indies was formed in April 1958 in Trinidad, in the context of the West Indies Federation. Although the West Indies Federation was dissolved, it was decided at a Commissioners conference in 1962 in Dominica to continue the group. The name was changed to the Caribbean Link for Guiding.

== Fiftieth anniversary ==
The Caribbean Link's fiftieth anniversary celebrations culminated on 22 April 2009. An anniversary song was composed by Girl Guide Caryl Edwards of Antigua.
