= Scouting and Guiding in Burkina Faso =

Scouting and Guiding associations in Burkina Faso

The Scout and Guide movement in Burkina Faso is served by two organisations

- Association des Guides du Burkina Faso, member of the World Association of Girl Guides and Girl Scouts
- Fédération Burkinabé du Scoutisme, member of the World Organization of the Scout Movement
