= Scouting and Guiding in Mali =

Scouting and Guiding organizations in Mali

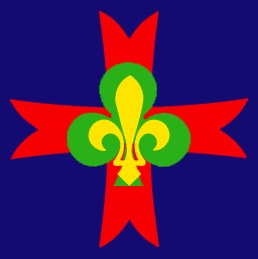
The first emblem of Catholic Scouting in Mali.

Scouting and Guiding in Mali is served by two groups: the Association des Scouts et Guides du Mali, member of the World Organization of the Scout Movement and the Guides et Scouts Catholiques du Mali, a UIGSE-inspired Roman Catholic organization.
