= Nellie Robinson =

Nellie Robinson may refer to:

- Nellie Robinson (educator) (1880–1972), Antiguan teacher and school founder
- Nellie Robinson (politician) (1915–1992), first woman mayor in Queensland, Australia
