= Scouting and Guiding in the Comoros =

Scouting and Guiding Associations in the Comoros

The Scout and Guide movement in Comoros is served by

- Wezo Mbeli, member of the World Organization of the Scout Movement
- World Federation of Independent Scouts – Comoros, member of the World Federation of Independent Scouts
