= Scouts of the World Award =

Award of the World Organization of the Scout Movement

WOSM Scouts of the world award
- World Organization of the Scout Movement Scouts of the world award badge
- Country: WOSM members
- Created: 22 April 2005
- Founder: World Organization of the Scout Movement
- Awarded for: awareness of "world issues and... (obtaining) necessary experience and skills to become a citizen of the world."

The World Organization of the Scout Movement (WOSM) Scouts of the World Award is available to Scouts and non-Scouts. It was introduced in 2005 to give "young people more opportunities to face the challenges of the future", as identified by the United Nations Millennium Declaration in 2000 which identified eight Millennium Development Goals, and helps participants work towards those goals.

The award is implemented through WOSM member organizations to improve their senior programs. Young people aged 15 to 26 years, including non-Scouts, can earn the award. WOSM claims an award available to non-Scouts "provides NSOs [National Scout Organizations] with a great opportunity to increase their membership at the local and national levels, resulting from the possibility to invite non-Scout persons (in the age covered by the Rover section, 18-22) to participate in the Rover Programme, and to encourage them, after completing the Scouts of the World Award, to be part of the Rover section." The award has two components:

- Scouts of the World Discovery;
- Scouts of the World Voluntary Service.

Scouts who have obtained the award can access the Scouts of the World Network.

== Participating bodies ==
WOSM member organizations who have adopted the award include (as of 2007):

- WOSM-Interamerican Region
  - Scouts de Argentina
  - Asociación de Scouts de Bolivia
  - União dos Escoteiros do Brasil
  - Association des Scouts du Canada
  - Scouts Canada
  - Asociación de Guías y Scouts de Chile
  - Asociación Scouts de Colombia
  - Asociación de Guías y Scouts de Costa Rica
  - Asociación de Scouts del Ecuador
  - Asociación de Scouts de El Salvador
  - Asociación de Scouts de México, A.C.
  - Scouts de Nicaragua
  - Asociacion de Scouts del Peru
  - Movimiento Scout del Uruguay
  - Asociación de Scouts de Venezuela
- WOSM-European Region
  - The Danish Scout Association
  - Eclaireuses et Eclaireurs de France
  - Eclaireuses et Eclaireurs unionistes de France
  - Les Scouts et Guides de France
  - Eesti Skautide Ühing
  - Deutsche Pfadfinderschaft Sankt Georg (DPSG)
  - Scout Association of Greece
  - Scouting Ireland
  - Associazione Guide e Scouts Cattolici Italiani
  - Associazione Guide e Scouts Cattolici Italiani (AGESCI)
  - Israel Boy and Girl Scouts Federation
  - Lëtzebuerger Guiden a Scouten (Guides et Scouts du Luxembourg)
  - Scouting Nederland
  - Corpo Nacional de Escutas (Portugal)
  - The National Scout Organization of Romania
  - Scout Organization of Serbia
  - Scout Association of Slovenia (ZTS)
  - Scouts de España (ASDE)
  - The Swedish Guide and Scout Council
  - Scouting and Guiding Federation of Turkey
  - Swiss Guide and Scout Movement (SGSM)
  - The Scout Association (UK: Scout Network only, i.e. for young adults aged 18-24).
- WOSM-Asia-Pacific Region
  - The Scout Association of Australia
  - The Singapore Scout Association
  - Sri Lanka Scout Association
  - Scouts of China (Taiwan)
  - Scout Association of Hong Kong
  - Scout Association of Japan
  - Korea Scout Association
  - The Scouts Association of Malaysia (Persekutuan Pengakap Malaysia)
  - The Scout Association of Maldives
  - National Scout Organization of Thailand
- WOSM-Arab Region
  - Algerian Muslim Scouts
  - Egypt Scout Federation
  - Jordanian Association for Boy Scouts and Girl Guides
  - Fédération du Scoutisme Libanais
  - Scouts of Syria
- WOSM-Eurasia Region (Defunct 2023)
  - Georgia Organization of the Scout Movement
  - Scout Association of Moldova
- WOSM-African Region
  - The Mauritius Scout Association
  - Confédération Sénégalaise du Scoutisme
  - Scouts South Africa
  - The Uganda Scouts Association
  - The Scout Association of Zimbabwe

== See also ==
- Rover Scout
