= The Mauritius Girl Guides Association =

National Guiding organization of Mauritius

- Country: Mauritius
- Founded: 1926
- Membership: 1,051
- Affiliation: World Association of Girl Guides and Girl Scouts

The Mauritius Girl Guides Association is the national Guiding organization of Mauritius. It serves 1,051 members (as of 2003). Founded in 1926, the girls-only organization became a full member of the World Association of Girl Guides and Girl Scouts in 1975.

== History ==
The original Mauritian Girl Guides Association, founded in 1926, was only open to English-speaking girls. Later, French-speaking girls also became eligible but membership was restricted to girls of European descent. In 1939 the Anglican community opened the group to girls of all nationalities. Soon afterwards, the Roman Catholic community opened its own, similar groups.

In 1990, the Mauritius Girl Guides Association expanded to include Rodrigues Island.

== See also ==
- The Mauritius Scout Association
