= The Girl Guides Association of Antigua and Barbuda =

- Headquarters: Deanery Lane
- Location: St John's
- Country: Antigua and Barbuda
- Founded: 1931
- Membership: 437
- President: Lynette Workman
- Chief Commissioner: Carmen Benjamin
- Patron: Dame Louise Lake-Tack
- Affiliation: World Association of Girl Guides and Girl Scouts

The Girl Guides Association of Antigua and Barbuda is the Guiding organization of Antigua and Barbuda. It serves 437 members (as of 2017). Founded in 1931, the girls-only organization became an associate member of the World Association of Girl Guides and Girl Scouts in 1984 and a full member in 2002.

The Girl Guide Association of Antigua and Barbuda belongs to the Caribbean Link. At the introduction of the West Indies political federation, the Antigua association linked with other Caribbean associations. Although the West Indies Federation was undone in 1962, the Girl Guide Associations' link remains.

== History ==
The program began in 1931; at that time, Antigua and Barbuda was a British colony, and the first companies were registered with the UK guide association. Dame Nellie Robinson was a pioneering member of Guiding in Antigua. In 1958, it joined the Federal Link of the Girl Guides Associations of the West Indies, now the Caribbean Link for Guiding.

In 1983, it became an independent organization, and it became an association member of the World Association of Girl Guides and Girl Scouts the next year. At that time, membership was 538. It became a full member in 2002. As of 2017, membership was 437. The headquarters in St John's was broken into and stolen from in 2024, within a few years of a previous theft.

The Association became legally incorporated in 2025.

== Program ==
=== Sections ===
The association is divided in five sections according to age:

- Tweenie - ages 3 to 6
- Brownie Guide - ages 6 to 10
- Girl Guide - ages 10 to 15
- Ranger Guide - ages 15 to 18
- Young Leader - ages 18 to 25
- Leader/Guider - ages 25 and older

=== Guide Promise ===
I promise that I will do my best:
To do my duty to God
To serve the Queen and my country and help other people, and
To keep the Guide Law.

=== Guide Law ===
1. A Guide is loyal and can be trusted.
2. A Guide is honest.
3. A Guide is polite and considerate.
4. A Guide is friendly and a sister to all Guides.
5. A Guide is kind to animals and respects all living things.
6. A Guide is obedient.
7. A Guide has courage and is cheerful in all difficulties.
8. A Guide makes good use of her time.
9. A Guide takes care of her own possession and those of other people.
10. A Guide is self-controlled in all she thinks, says, and does.

== Activities ==
The Peggy Rodgers Fund was set up in memory of a Guiding Island Commissioner. It assists with the training and development of Guides and has sent them to overseas Guiding events.

In 2001, the Guides were involved in a composting pilot project with the Antigua National Solid Waste Management Authority. In 2024, the Girl Guides joined an advocacy walk against gender-related violence; the next year, over a hundred Guides signed up to participate. A speaker for the organiser said they were "truly elated" by the number of Guides joining the event and said they would likely be the largest organised group there.

== See also ==
- Antigua and Barbuda Branch of The Scout Association
