= World Scout Youth Forum =

- Owner: World Organization of the Scout Movement
- Date: 2008
- Defunct: 2021

The World Scout Youth Forum was a deliberative and consultative general assembly of the World Organization of the Scout Movement (WOSM), which provided an opportunity for young members of World Scouting to discuss and express their views on issues of interest to them. Through preparing inputs and making recommendations to the World Scout Conference and to the World Scout Committee, to which the Forum was linked, participants developed the skills necessary to strengthen their capacity to take part in decision-making processes. It was one of WOSM's most important events. The Forum was removed as an event by resolution of the 43rd World Scout Conference in 2021.

Each National Scout Organization was invited to send a delegation to the World Scout Youth Forum. Only individuals who were members of WOSM could be delegates to the World Scout Youth Forum, with participants between their 18th and 26th birthdays in the year of the Forum.

== Background ==
The World Scout Youth Forum (WSYF) was an educational tool to support the process of developing youth participation in partnership with adults for young members in the oldest age sections.

Each National Scout Association can send up to two delegates and three observers; therefore, the maximum number of participants on a delegation is five.

According to Resolution 6/02 on Youth Involvement in Decision-Making of the World Scout Conference, the WSYF aim was to enable young people to reach three different aims, which are 1. share their ideas and experiences on current issues affecting young people in different parts of the world; 2. suggest ways of strengthening national youth policies and training young people for world citizenship; and 3. contribute new ideas to the Movement on how to enrich educational programs for young people over 16.

== Delegates and observers ==
Delegates and Observers for the Forum should be included in the appropriate form returned to the World Scout Bureau in advance of the event. If this is not completed before registration, each Delegate and Observer was required to produce an official letter of appointment clearly indicating the function of either Delegate or Observer, signed by the President, International Commissioner or other responsible official of his or her National Scout Organization.

== Youth Advisors to the World Scout Committee ==
The World Scout Committee referring to Strategic Priority Number 1 "Youth Involvement"; and Resolution 11/05 World Scout Youth Forum, adopted at the 37th World Scout Conference. The role of the Youth Advisors are to increasing youth participation in decision making and strengthening youth involvement within the Scout Movement is a key issue for the World Scout Committee. The system of Youth Advisors has been created in the spirit of strengthening youth participation in World Scouting, and is considered as an interim measure in achieving that goal. The Youth Advisors have the responsibility to individually work for WOSM as a whole – not only the young members of the organization – however the Youth Advisors elected at the World Scout Youth Forum have a responsibility towards their constituency.

The Youth Advisors to the World Scout Committee are elected in the World Scout Youth Forum to assist and to advise the World Scout Committee in the perspective of youth. All the participants of the World Scout Youth Forum are able to run for the election, while only one candidate can be nominated by each NSO. Six Youth Advisors were elected and attended meetings of the World Scout Committee and all meetings of the next World Scout Youth Forum Planning Committee meeting.

== Listing of events ==
| Number | Host | Place | Time |
|---|---|---|---|
| 1 | Japan | Tokyo | 1971 |
| 2 | Norway | Lillehammer | 1975 |
| 3 | Canada | Alberta | 1983 |
| 4 | Australia | Melbourne | 1990 |
| 5 | Switzerland | Kandersteg | 1992 |
| 6 | Norway | Moss | 1996 |
| 7 | South Africa | Balgowan | 1999 |
| 8 | Greece | Metsovo | 2002 |
| 9 | Tunisia | Hammamet | 2005 |
| 10 | South Korea | Iksan | 2008 |
| 11 | Brazil | Blumenau | 2011 |
| 12 | Slovenia | Rogla | 2014 |
| 13 | Azerbaijan | Qabala | 2017 |
| 14 | (Digital) | | 2021 |
