= Wezo Mbeli =

National Scouting organization of the Comoros

Wezombeli
- Logo for Wezo Mbeli
- Country: Comoros
- Founded: 1975
- Membership: 1,725
- Affiliation: World Organization of the Scout Movement
- Website www.wezombeli.org

Wezo Mbeli, the national scouting organization of the Comoros, was founded in 1975, and became a member of the World Organization of the Scout Movement in 1990. The coeducational Wezombeli has 1,725 members as of 2004. The development of Scouting has been hampered by civil unrest and lack of political stability in the country.

The Scout Motto is Uwe Tayari, Be Prepared in Swahili, and Sois Prêt, Be Prepared in French.

== Organization ==
The Scout association has four sections:

- Louveteaux (Cub Scouts)
- Scouts
- Scouts Aînés (Senior Scouts)
- Routiers (Rover Scouts).

The Routiers branch is open to boys and girls.
