= Fédération Burkinabé du Scoutisme =

National federation of Scouting in Burkina Faso

Fédération Burkinabé du Scoutisme/Scout Federation of Burkina Faso
- The membership badge of the Scouts du Burkina Faso features a white stallion, a supporter on the coat of arms of Burkina Faso

- The membership badge of the Éclaireurs et Éclaireuses du Burkina Faso features a silhouette map of the country
- Country: Burkina Faso
- Founded: 1943
- Membership: 7,644
- Affiliation: World Organization of the Scout Movement

The Fédération Burkinabé du Scoutisme, the national federation of two Scouting organizations in Burkina Faso, was founded in 1943, and became a member of the World Organization of the Scout Movement in 1972 under the name of Upper Volta. The coeducational Fédération Burkinabé du Scoutisme had 9,398 members as of 2011 and 7,644 as of 2021.

The Scout Federation of Burkino Faso consists of Les Scouts du Burkina Faso and Les Éclaireurs et Éclaireuses du Burkina Faso.

== Activities ==
Scouting pays particular attention to rural Scouting and community development in rural areas. Scouts participate in development projects run by the government by running large work camps planting trees, operating rural and urban centers and improving the water supplies.

== Program sections ==
- Pré-Louveteaux (Pre-Cubs) - younger than 7
- Louvetaux (Cub Scouts) - ages 7 to 12
- Éclaireurs (Scouts) - ages 12 to 17
- Aînés (Rover Scouts) - ages 17 to 25

The Scout Motto is Prêt à servir, Ready to Serve in French.
