= Scouting and Guiding in Montserrat =

Scouting and Guiding movement in Montserrat

Scout Association of Montserrat
- Country: Montserrat

Scouting and Guiding in Montserrat exist as branches of the parent organisations in the United Kingdom.

== The Scout Association of Montserrat ==
The Scout Association of Montserrat operates as a branch of the United Kingdom Scout Association, due to Montserrat's affiliation as a British Overseas Territory. The Montserrat Scout Oath and Law, as well as other Scouting requirements, closely follow that of the United Kingdom.

Although the program activities are taken from the British system, Montserrat Scouting is geared to the local way of life. Training for Wood Badge and leader training are conducted with the help of British and nearby affiliated Scout associations. Montserrat Scouts participate in numerous camps and events.

Since the evacuation of much of the island, owing to an eruption of the previously dormant Soufriere Hills volcano that began on July 18, 1995, information from the area is difficult to obtain.

== Girlguiding Montserrat ==
Girlguiding Montserrat
- Country: Montserrat
- Chief Guide: Liz Burnley

Girlguiding Montserrat (formerly Montserrat Girl Guide Association) is a Guiding organization in Montserrat. It is one of the nine branch associations of Girlguiding UK. It is represented by Girlguiding UK at World Association of Girl Guides and Girl Scouts (WAGGGS) level and Girlguiding UK's Chief Guide is also Chief Guide for Girlguiding Montserrat. Girlguiding Montserrat is part of the Caribbean Link for Guiding.

The program is a modified form of Guiding in the United Kingdom, adapted to suit local conditions, with the same promise, and Rainbow, Brownie, Guide and Ranger groups.

An eruption of Mount Soufrière in 1997 destroyed the Guide Headquarters on Montserrat. It had been open less than ten years. In 2007, the rebuilding of Headquarters began using money raised by Girl Guides and Brownies in the north-east of England.
