= Scouting and Guiding in Anguilla =

Scouting and Guiding movement in Anguilla

Scouting and Guiding in Anguilla exist as branches of the parent organisations in the United Kingdom.

== The Scout Association of Anguilla ==
The Scout Association of Anguilla
- Location: P.O. Box 1167, The Valley
- Country: Anguilla
- Chief Scout: Governor of Anguilla

The Scout Association of Anguilla operates as a branch of the United Kingdom Scout Association, due to Anguilla's status as a British Overseas Territory of the United Kingdom. The Anguillan Scout Oath and Law, as well as other Scouting requirements, closely follow that of the United Kingdom.

Although the program activities are taken from the British system, Anguilla Scouting is geared to the Caribbean way of life. Training for Wood Badge and leader training are conducted with the help of British and nearby Caribbean Scout associations. Anguillan Scouts participate in numerous Caribbean camps and events.

In 2015, Governor of Anguilla Christina Scott was made Chief Scout by the Scouts of Anguilla during a visit by Scouts from Coventry and Warwickshire, United Kingdom.

== Girlguiding Anguilla ==
Girlguiding Anguilla
- Country: Anguilla
- Founded: 1933
- Membership: 100
- Chief Guide: Liz Burnley
- Branch Commissioner: Oluwakemi M. Linda Banks

Girlguiding Anguilla (formerly Anguilla Girl Guide Association) is a Guiding organization in Anguilla, founded in 1933. It is one of the nine branch associations of Girlguiding UK. It is represented by Girlguiding UK at World Association of Girl Guides and Girl Scouts (WAGGGS) level and Girlguiding UK's Chief Guide is also Chief Guide for Girlguiding Anguilla. Girlguiding Anguilla is part of the Caribbean Link for Guiding.

In 1968, Anguilla issued a set of four postage stamps celebrating the 35th anniversary of Girl Guiding in Anguilla.

The program is a modified form of Guiding in the United Kingdom, adapted to suit local conditions, with the same Promise, and Rainbow, Brownie, Guide and Ranger groups.

== See also ==
- The Scout Association of Saint Kitts and Nevis
