= The Gambia Scout Association =

National scouting organization of Gambia

- Country: The Gambia
- Founded: 1921
- Membership: 18,448
- Affiliation: World Organization of the Scout Movement

The Gambia Scout Association, the national scouting organization of the Gambia, was founded in 1921, and became a member of the World Organization of the Scout Movement in 1984.

== Activities ==
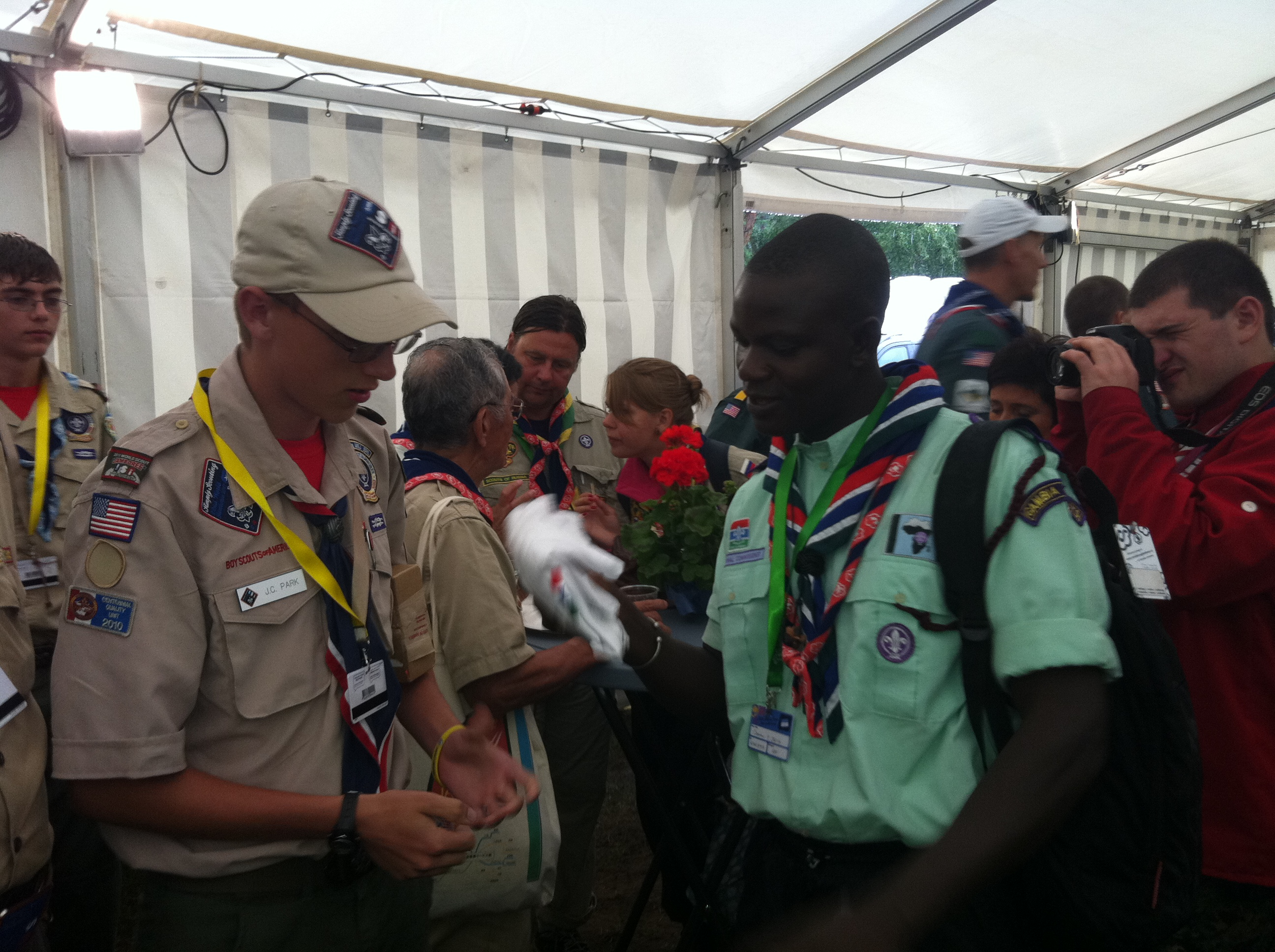

The coeducational Gambia Scout Association has 18,448 members as of 2008.

Special activities include community service projects such as tree planting. Scouts regularly participate in camping and hiking. Music is also a very important part of Scouting in the Gambia, but because there is little money for instruments and sheet music, there is a waiting list to get into the Scout band, and they learn all their music by ear.

== Presidents ==
- Alhaji Alieu Ebrima Cham Joof served the movement from 1938 to 2005; former President of the Gambia National Scout Council; scholar on the history of scouting in the Gambia; and first Gambian to be awarded the Wood Badge.
- In 2007, David Hafner replaced Alieu Mamar Njie as chief commissioner.

== Controversies ==
In September 2015, six executives of the association were arrested for conspiracy to commit a felony, obtaining money by false pretence and stealing a motor vehicle.

== See also ==
- The Gambia Girl Guides Association
