= The Gambia Girl Guides Association =

National Guiding organization of the Gambia

- Country: The Gambia
- Founded: 1923
- Membership: 9,371
- Affiliation: World Association of Girl Guides and Girl Scouts

The Gambia Girl Guides Association (GGGA) is the national Guiding organization of the Gambia. It serves 9,371 members (as of 2003). Founded in 1923, the girls-only organization became a full member of the World Association of Girl Guides and Girl Scouts in 1966.

== See also ==
- The Gambia Scout Association
