= Scouting and Guiding in Gibraltar =

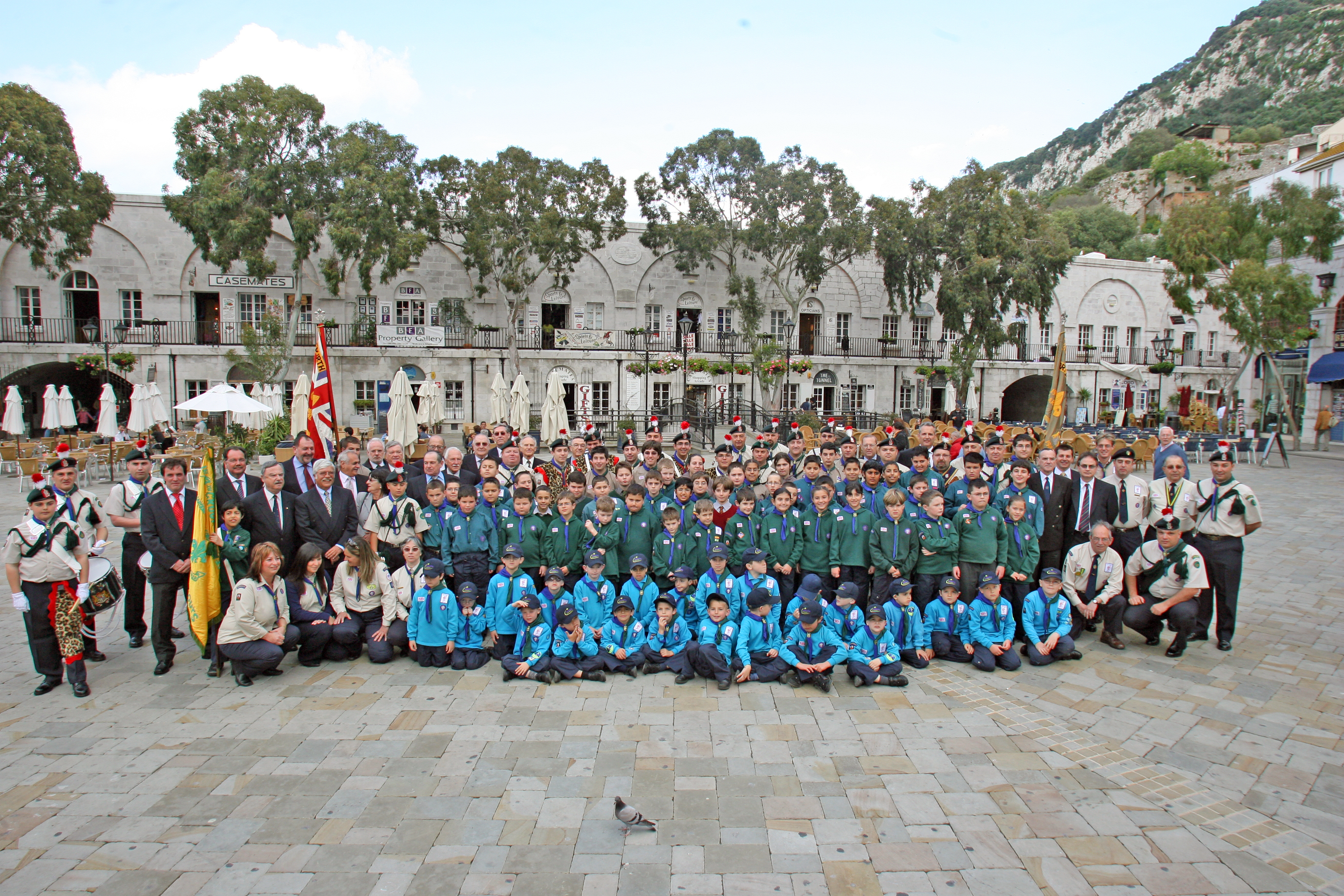
Gibraltar Scouts at Grand Casemates Square during their centenary celebrations, March 2008

Scouting and Guiding in Gibraltar exist as branches of the parent organisations in the United Kingdom.

== Gibraltar Scouts ==
Gibraltar Scouts
- Owner: The Scout Association
- Headquarters: Lathbury
- Country: Gibraltar
- Founded: 27 March 1908
- Founder: Robert Baden-Powell, 1st Baron Baden-Powell
- Membership: approximately 282
- Chief Scout: HE The Governor of Gibraltar
- Chief Commissioner: Mark Rodriguez
- Website http://www.gibscouts.com

Standard uniform colors for older Scouts in Gibraltar	Standard uniform colors for younger Scouts in Gibraltar

Gibraltar Scouts operates as a branch of the United Kingdom Scout Association, due to Gibraltar's affiliation as a British overseas territory. Gibraltar Boy Scouts were first recognised as a Branch of the Boy Scouts Association of the United Kingdom in 1913.

=== History ===
Both Scout emblems incorporate elements of the coat of arms of Gibraltar.

The first overseas troop of The Scout Association, the 1st Gibraltar Scout Troop, was established on 27 March 1908. It has since amalgamated with the 4th Gibraltar Scout Troop, becoming the 1st/4th Gibraltar (Marques of Milford Haven's Own) Scout Group. This is the largest Group in Gibraltar with a membership of 180 members divided into two Beaver colonies, two Cub packs, two Scout troops, one Explorer Unit and a Corps of Drums. The 2nd Gibraltar Boy Scout Troop was formed in 1910. The first Wolf Cub Pack in Gibraltar was formed in 1914. The first Rover Crew was formed by the 2nd Gibraltar Scout Group in 1928. The 3rd and 4th Gibraltar Scout Troop were formed prior to 1913.

The Gibraltar Sea Scouts arose from an amalgamation of the 5th Gibraltar Sea Scouts, formed in 1914, with the 3rd Gibraltar Sea Scouts Group. The Group is Royal Navy recognised. The group is well known for its band, the Gibraltar Sea Scouts Pipe Band.

In 2008, to celebrate the 100th anniversary of the formation of Scouting in Gibraltar, the Gibraltar Parliament passed a motion conferring Freedom of the City of Gibraltar on The Scout Association (Gibraltar Branch).

=== Program ===
The Gibraltar Scout Promise and Law, as well as other Scouting requirements, closely follow those of the UK. Although the program activities are taken from the British system, Gibraltar Scouting is geared to the local way of life. Training for Wood Badge and leader training are conducted with the help of British and nearby affiliated Scout associations. The Policy, Organisation and Rules (POR) applicable in the UK also apply in Gibraltar. Gibraltar Scouts participate in numerous camps and events in Gibraltar as well as throughout the UK and southern Spain.

== Girlguiding Gibraltar ==
Girlguiding Gibraltar
- Country: Gibraltar
- Founded: 1914/1925
- Founder: Robert Baden-Powell, 1st Baron Baden-Powell
- Chief Guide: Liz Burnley

Girlguiding Gibraltar (formerly Gibraltar Girl Guide Association) is a Guiding organization in Gibraltar. It is one of the nine branch associations of Girlguiding UK. It is represented by Girlguiding UK at World Association of Girl Guides and Girl Scouts (WAGGGS) level and Girlguiding UK's Chief Guide is also Chief Guide for Girlguiding Gibraltar. The program is a modified form of Guiding in the United Kingdom, adapted to suit local conditions, with the same promise, and Rainbow, Brownie, Guide and Ranger groups.

=== History ===
The first Girl Guides troop in Gibraltar was formed in summer 1914, its creation was reported to the Colonial Secretary on 28 August 1914. However, the official founding year of the branch is given with 1925 and was remembered by three stamps issued on 10 October 1975.

In April 2009 the Gibraltar Parliament conferred the Honorary Freedom of the City of Gibraltar upon the local Girl Guide movement in recognition of decades of positive contribution to the community.
