= Scouting and Guiding in the Cayman Islands =

Scouting and Guiding movement in the Cayman Islands

Scouting and Guiding in the Cayman Islands exist as branches of the parent organisations in the United Kingdom.

== The Scout Association of the Cayman Islands ==
The Scout Association of the Cayman Islands
- Location: P.O. Box 1160 - George Town, Grand Cayman
- Country: Cayman Islands
- Chief Scout: Stuart Jack

The Scout Association of the Cayman Islands operates as a branch of the United Kingdom Scout Association, due to the Cayman Islands' affiliation as a British Overseas Territory. The Cayman Islands' Scout Oath and Law, as well as other Scouting requirements, closely follow that of the United Kingdom. Membership is about 500 Scouts. In October 2006, Governor Stuart Jack was installed as Chief Scout.

Scouting has existed in the Cayman Islands since the early 1920s. There has been rapid growth since 1990, mainly due to a full-time Scouting Executive, improved public image and more Scouters including expatriates becoming involved. There has been a move to bring Scouting to all communities and islands.

Although the program activities are taken from the British system, Cayman Scouting is geared to the Caribbean way of life. Training for Wood Badge and leader training are conducted with the help of British and nearby Caribbean Scout associations.

The government of the Cayman Islands supports Scouting, providing meeting places, as well as funding for an executive commissioner. Camping is illegal throughout the Cayman Islands.

Cayman Scouts participate in numerous Caribbean camps and events, and Scouts from the Cayman Islands participated in the 1998 World Jamboree in Chile.

The Scout emblem incorporates elements of the coat of arms of the Cayman Islands.

== Girlguiding Cayman Islands ==
Girlguiding Cayman Islands
- Headquarters: P.O. Box 31; George Town; Grand Cayman
- Country: Cayman Islands
- Membership: 200
- Chief Guide: Liz Burnley
- Branch Commissioner: Mellony Bryan

Girlguiding Cayman Islands (formerly The Cayman Islands Girl Guide Association) is a Guiding organization in the Cayman Islands. It is one of the nine branch associations of Girlguiding UK. It is represented by Girlguiding UK at World Association of Girl Guides and Girl Scouts (WAGGGS) level and Girlguiding UK's Chief Guide is also Chief Guide for Cayman Islands Girlguiding. Cayman Islands Girlguiding is part of the Caribbean Link for Guiding.

The program is a modified form of Guiding in the United Kingdom, adapted to suit local conditions, with the same promise, and Rainbow, Brownie, Guide and Ranger groups.
