= The Mauritius Scout Association =

National Scouting association of Mauritius

Mauritius Scout Association
- Headquarters: Baden Powell House
- Location: Trianon
- Country: Mauritius
- Founded: 1971 incorporated 1976
- Founder: The Scout Association of the United Kingdom
- Membership: 5250
- Chief Scout: Percy Appadoo
- Chief Commissioner: Pascal Speville
- Training Commissioner: Nicholas Rosa
- Affiliation: World Organization of the Scout Movement
- Website http://www.scoutsmauritius.org/

The Mauritius Scout Association is a Scouting organisation in Mauritius. The association was founded in 1971 and became a member of the World Organization of the Scout Movement (WOSM) in 1971. The coeducational association had 2,782 members (as of 2010).

== History ==
In 1912, 17 year old Samuel Blunt de Burgh Edwards formed the first patrol of Scouts in Mauritius and later became the first leader. He is regarded as the founder of Scouting in Mauritius. A number of Scout troops developed. In 1913, The Boy Scouts Association of the United Kingdom established its Mauritian Local Association which became its Mauritian Branch. This branch consisted of different affiliated associations, separated by faiths.

Upon the independence of Mauritius in 1968, two reports were launched to ensure the development of Scouting in Mauritius. In 1971, The Mauritius Scout Association was constituted as an autonomous organisation and single successor to The Scout Association's Mauritian Branch and the different religious Scout associations. The association was admitted to WOSM in the same year. The association was incorporated in 1976.

== Program ==
The aim of the Mauritius Scout Association is "to encourage the physical, mental, social, emotional and spiritual development of young people so that they may take a constructive place in society". Self-reliance, service and adventure and Scout craft are major features of the program. Proficiency badges are divided into four categories, interest, pursuit, service and instructor.

Most Scout groups are sponsored by religious bodies, schools, colleges, and others institutions. All Scouts help during religious processions, regardless of creed, and carry sick people at the Fête Annuelle des Malades (Annual Festival of the Ill).

Community services including helping to evacuate flooded areas during cyclones, assisting in refugee centers, cleaning roads and repairing houses. Scouts are also involved in a variety of community development projects.

=== National Youth Scout Council ===
NYSC 2025-2027:

- President: Samuël Barbe
- Vice-President: Noemie Ohis
- Secretary: Anne Laure Faivre
- Treasurer: Noemi Lucasse
- Commission Rover: Megane Azor
- Commission Ventures: Axel Victor
- Commission Scouts: Emily Valayoodum
- Commission Cubs: Gregory Brunet
- Commission International: Chloe Poinen
- Commission Communication: Brandon Duljeet
- Commission ARD: Donah Veerapen
- Commission Training: Noemie Ohis
- Youth Advisor District Port Louis: Michael Etiennette
- Youth Advisor District North: Toddy Jowree
- Youth Advisor District Lower: Alexandre Felix
- Youth Advisor District Upper/South: Guillaume Chowrimootoo
- Youth Advisor District Moka/Flacq: Icelly Ecumoir

=== Sections ===
The association is divided in four sections:

- Cub Scouts (ages 8 to 11)
- Scouts (ages 12 to 15)
- Venture Scouts (ages 15 to 18)
- Rover Scouts (ages 19 to 23)

=== Scout Law, Promise and Motto ===
As most Mauritians speak French, the French version of Scout Law, Promise and Motto are more frequently used than the English ones. Both versions are part of the association's constitution.

The Scout Motto is Toujours Prêt or Be Prepared.

==== Scout Promise ====
- Sur mon honneur je promets de faire de mon mieux, pour servir Dieu et mon pays, d'aider les autres, et d'observer la Loi Scoute.
- On my honour, I promise that I will do my best, to do my duty to God and to my country, to help other people and to keep the Scout Law.

==== Scout Law ====
- Un Scout inspire confiance. - A Scout is to be trusted.
- Un Scout est loyal. - A Scout is loyal.
- Un Scout est amical et chevalresque. - A Scout is friendly and considerate.
- Un Scout est le frère de tout autre Scouts. - A Scout is a brother to all Scouts.
- Un Scout affronte les difficultés avec courage. - A Scout has courage in all difficulties.
- Un Scout fait bon usage de son temps et prend soin de ses biens et ceux des autres. - A Scout makes good use of his time and is careful of his possessions and property.
- Un Scout se respecte et respecte les autres. - A Scout has respect for himself and for others.

== See also ==
- The Mauritius Girl Guides Association
