= Scouts du Mali =

Scouting organization in Mali

- Scouts of Mali
- Country: Mali
- Founded: 1947/1994
- Membership: 40,689

Scouts du Mali (Scouts of Mali) is one of several Scouting organizations in Mali. Scouting was started in then French Sudan in 1947, but disappeared in the 1960s. Activities were restarted in 1994. The association is apparently working toward World Organization of the Scout Movement (WOSM) recognition. Mali is one of 29 countries where there is no National Scout Organization which is a member of the World Organization of the Scout Movement at the present time.

The Scout emblem of the Scouts du Mali is unique in that it features the human effigy tribal figure, kanaga, that appeared on the original Malian independence flag adopted on April 4, 1959, when Mali joined the Mali Federation, but was removed on March 1, 1961 due to Islamic aniconism, the belief against depiction of human life.

== Association des Scouts et Guides du Mali ==
Association des Scouts et Guides du Mali
- Country: Mali
- Founded: 2021/2022
- Membership: 5,026 (March 2024)
- Affiliation: WOSM

A new association, Association des Scouts et Guides du Mali, (ASGM) was formed from an amalgamation of existing associations including Scouts du Mali in 2022. In June 2024, it became the 175th member of the World Organization of the Scout Movement (WOSM) as a full member of the Africa Scout Region.
