= Nellie Robinson (educator) =

Antiguan teacher

- Born: Georgiana Ellen Robinson; 7 December 1880; St. John's, Presidency of Antigua
- Died: 29 April 1972 (aged 91); St. John's, Associated State of Antigua
- Other name: Miz Rob
- Occupation: Educator
- Years active: 1889–1950
- Known for: Founding the Thomas Oliver Robinson Memorial School (TOR)

Dame Georgiana Ellen Robinson, DNH, MBE (7 December 1880 – 29 April 1972), was an Antiguan teacher and school founder who was a pioneer in education. She broke down colour and class barriers, believing that all children should have access to learning. As of 2017, she was the only woman to have received the Order of the National Hero from the government of Antigua and Barbuda.

== Early life ==
Georgiana Ellen Robinson was born on 7 December 1880 in St. John's on the island of Antigua in the West Indies to Margaret and George Robinson. As the second of eight children, she was raised in the family home on Newgate Street in St. John's, until the age of around ten, when she was sent to the United States to study in the American school system. By the age of 13, she was acting as a household helper and nanny and the following year, she returned to Antigua. To further her education, Robinson enrolled in Coke Memorial College. Though it was a Methodist school and Robinson was Anglican, Coke allowed students of African heritage, which the elite Anglican schools prohibited, unless the children were of the elite upper class. The school was only operational for about a decade due to the lack of funding available, since the government only provided funds for the Anglican schools. When Coke closed, Robinson pursued education on her own, studying for her Senior Cambridge examination with Mr. D. S. B, Jones. She passed her examination and furthered her studies, obtaining certificates in music and music theory with Mrs. Lamond (née Tull).

== Career ==
When Robinson completed her schooling, she was determined to improve the educational opportunities of black students. Her brother, Thomas Oliver Robinson, suggested she found a school herself. She did so, and named it in remembrance him, as he had recently died of typhoid fever. In 1898, when she was 18, Robinson opened the Thomas Oliver Robinson Memorial School (most often known as TOR or TOR Memorial) for children of all races, classes, and faiths—her doors were open to anyone desiring to improve their education and life. In a pioneering move for the time, Robinson admitted illegitimate children and lobbied for the change of official practice barring illegitimate children from secondary school. She established the first coeducational secondary school on the island, successfully challenging the officials which tried to close her school by claiming the teachers were unqualified and that the conditions were unsanitary.

In the beginning, most of her students were mixed-race as most blacks could not afford schooling. Only forty years had lapsed since slavery was abolished and British colonialism imposed class and race inequalities upon people of non-white backgrounds. As soon as she was financially able to do so, Robinson began funding scholarships for poor, black children. TOR Memorial students were encouraged in both intellectual and artistic pursuits, and the school staged entertainment such as musicals and operettas. As the reputation of the school became known, enrollment increased and soon Robinson's classes represented the social spectrum of the country. Sir Ernest Bickham Sweet-Escott recommended that Robinson be given a grant to further the school's educational aims.

In 1912, Robinson served on the Water Preservation Committee, formed to expand the access to piped water in the country. In 1915, during World War I, Robinson was the only black woman to serve on the Antiguan Mobilization Committee. Robinson recruited men to travel to Canada or Britain to enlist, but also lobbied for improvements in the living conditions for men being shipped overseas for service. She was one of the people who helped establish The Girl Guides Association of Antigua and Barbuda and served as a committee member of the association. In 1935, she was given a commemorative medal at the Silver Jubilee of King George V in recognition of her contributions to education and in 1941 she was honored as a Member of Order of the British Empire.

In 1950, after having served over sixty years as headmistress of TOR Memorial, Robinson retired, leaving the running of the school to Ina Loving. She continued to be active, encouraging participation in cultural activities and in the 1950s supported the development of Antigua Carnival.

== Death and legacy ==
Robinson died on 29 April 1972 in St. John's and was buried at the St. John's Public Cemetery. Her funeral was attended by the Governor Sir Wilfred Jacobs and the Premier George Walter. In 1999, a panel organized by the Professional Organization of Women in Antigua reviewing outstanding contributions from women in Antigua and Barbuda, named Robinson as the Outstanding Woman of the Century. In 2006, at the celebrations for Antigua's 25th independence anniversary, she was named a Dame Companion of the Order of the National Hero. A decade after she was honored, she is the only woman to be declared a national hero and is recognized, along the other designees with an annual wreathe–laying on their graves.
