= Scouting and Guiding in the Falkland Islands =

Scouting and Guiding movement n the Falkland Islands

The Scout emblem incorporates elements of the coat of arms of the Falkland Islands.

Scouting and Guiding in the Falkland Islands are served by a part of the Scout Association and a branch of Girlguiding UK, due to the Falkland Islands' affiliation as an Overseas Territory of the United Kingdom.

== Scouting ==
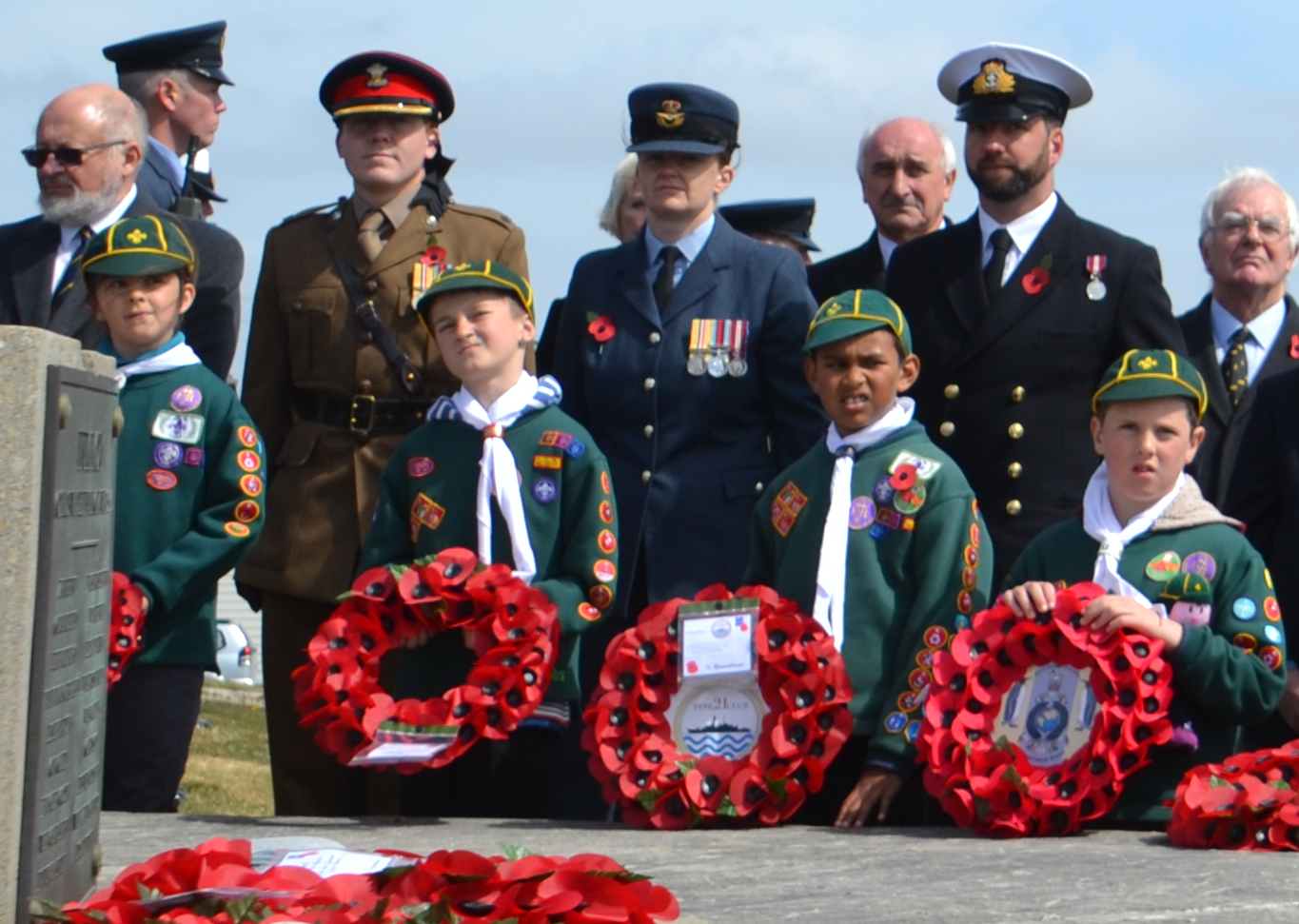
Cub Scouts of the 1st Falkland Islands Scout Group, Remembrance Sunday 2016

Scouting on the Falkland Islands started in 1984 when the 1st Falkland Islands Scout Group was established by Staff Sergeant Ian Roberts of the British Army. There is also an Explorer Scout Unit, the Falkland Islands Explorer Scout Unit. Both groups are administered as part of The Scout Association's British Scouting Overseas.

The Falkland Scout Oath and Law, as well as other Scouting requirements, are the same as those of the United Kingdom.

Although the program activities are taken from the British system, Falkland Scouting is geared to the local way of life. Training for Wood Badge and leader training are conducted with the help of British and nearby affiliated Scout associations. Falkland Scouts participate in numerous camps and events.

== Girl Guiding ==
Girlguiding Falkland Islands
- Country: Falkland Islands
- Chief Guide: Liz Burnley

Girlguiding Falkland Islands (formerly The Falkland Islands Girl Guide Association) is a Guiding organization in the Falkland Islands. It is one of the nine branch associations of Girlguiding UK. It is represented by Girlguiding UK at World Association of Girl Guides and Girl Scouts (WAGGGS) level and Girlguiding UK's Chief Guide is also Chief Guide for Falkland Islands Girlguiding.

The program is a modified form of Guiding in the United Kingdom, adapted to suit local conditions, with the same promise, and Rainbow, Brownie, Guide and Senior Guide groups.
