= Scouting and Guiding in the British Virgin Islands =

Scouting and Guiding movement in the British Virgin Islands

Scouting and Guiding in the British Virgin Islands exist as branches of the parent organisations in the United Kingdom.

== The Scout Association of the British Virgin Islands ==
The Scout Association of the British Virgin Islands
- Location: P.O. Box 3348, Road Town, Tortola
- Country: British Virgin Islands

The Scout Association of the British Virgin Islands operates as a branch of the United Kingdom Scout Association, due to the British Virgin Islands' affiliation as a British Overseas Territory. The BVI Scout Oath and Law, as well as other Scouting requirements, closely follow that of the United Kingdom.

Although the program activities are taken from the British system, BVI Scouting is geared to the Caribbean way of life. Training for Wood Badge and leader training are conducted with the help of British and nearby Caribbean Scout associations. BVI Scouts participate in numerous Caribbean camps and events.

== The British Virgin Islands Girl Guide Association ==
British Virgin Islands Girl Guide Association
- Country: British Virgin Islands
- Founded: 1928
- Chief Guide: Liz Burnley
- Branch Commissioner: Bernadine Louis

The British Virgin Islands Girl Guide Association is a Guiding organisation in the British Virgin Islands. It is one of the nine branch associations of Girlguiding UK. It is represented by Girlguiding UK at World Association of Girl Guides and Girl Scouts (WAGGGS) level and Girlguiding UK's Chief Guide is also Chief Guide for British Virgin Islands Girlguiding. British Virgin Islands Girlguiding is part of the Caribbean Link for Guiding.

The program is a modified form of Guiding in the United Kingdom, adapted to suit local conditions, with the same promise, and Rainbow, Brownie, Guide and Ranger groups.

== See also ==
- Scouting in the United States Virgin Islands
