= Scouting and Guiding in the Turks and Caicos Islands =

Scouting and Guiding movement in the Turks and Caicos Islands

Scouting and Guiding in the Turks and Caicos Islands exist as branches of the parent organisations in the United Kingdom.

== The Scout Association of the Turks and Caicos ==
The Scout Association of the Turks and Caicos
- Location: Grand Turk
- Country: Turks and Caicos

The Scout Association of The Turks and Caicos operates as a branch of the United Kingdom Scout Association, due to the Turks and Caicos Islands' affiliation as a British Overseas Territory. The Turks and Caicos Scout Oath and Law, as well as other Scouting requirements, closely follow that of the United Kingdom.

Although the program activities are taken from the British system, Turks and Caicos Scouting is geared to the local way of life. Training for Wood Badge and leader training are conducted with the help of British and nearby affiliated Scout associations. Turks and Caicos Scouts participate in numerous camps and events.

== Turks and Caicos Girlguiding ==
Turks and Caicos Girlguiding
- Country: Turks and Caicos Islands
- Chief Guide: Liz Burnley

Turks and Caicos Girlguiding (formerly The Turks and Caicos Girl Guide Association) is a Guiding organization in the Turks and Caicos Islands. It is one of the nine branch associations of Girlguiding UK. It is represented by Girlguiding UK at World Association of Girl Guides and Girl Scouts (WAGGGS) level and Girlguiding UK's Chief Guide is also Chief Guide for Turks and Caicos Girlguiding. Turks and Caicos Girlguiding is part of the Caribbean Link for Guiding.

The program is a modified form of Guiding in the United Kingdom, adapted to suit local conditions, with the same promise, and Rainbow, Brownie, Guide and Ranger groups.
