= Antigua and Barbuda Scout Association =

Youth organization in Antigua and Barbuda

Antigua and Barbuda Branch of The Scout Association
- Headquarters: St. John's, Antigua
- Country: Antigua and Barbuda
- Founded: 1917
- Membership: 105 as of August 2022
- Chief Scout: Rodney Williams (Governor-General of Antigua and Barbuda)
- Chief Commissioner: Patricia Salmon as of March 2019
- Affiliation: World Organization of the Scout Movement

The Antigua and Barbuda Scout Association (formerly the Antigua and Barbuda Branch of The Scout Association) is the national Scouting association for Antigua and Barbuda coeducational, with separate sections for boys and girls. Originally a subsidiary of the United Kingdom's Scout Association, it was granted full National Scout Association status in 2022.

== Background ==
Scouting is active in most of Antigua and Barbuda's villages, where Scouts learn the basic skills and practice them at an annual island-wide camp once a year. Scouts in Antigua and Barbuda have participated in many Caribbean camps and events.

The Scout emblem incorporates elements of the coat of arms of Antigua and Barbuda.

Scouting began in Antigua in April 1913 at Antigua Grammar School. Led by Richmond Wheeler and Samuel Branch, there were only 25 Scouts at that time. The current organization was founded in 1917, but celebrates the anniversary of the original organization.

Following a successful application in August 2022, the Association was granted full membership of the World Organization of the Scout Movement (WOSM) in November 2022, becoming its 173rd member.

== See also ==
- The Girl Guides Association of Antigua and Barbuda
