= The Scout Association of Dominica =

Scouting organisation in Dominica

- Membership: 1,100
- Chief Scout: Dr. Nicholas Liverpool
- Chairman, Executive Committee: Anthony Commodore
- Chief Scout Commissioner: Edward C. Henderson
- Affiliation: World Organization of the Scout Movement
- Website https://web.archive.org/web/20080721221441/http://www.webspawner.com:80/users/dcascouts/

The Scout Association of Dominica, the national Scouting organization of Dominica, was founded in 1929 and became a member of the World Organization of the Scout Movement in 1990. The coeducational Scout Association of Dominica had 1,100 members as of 2004.

Scouting is mainly active in the villages of this Caribbean island. Dominica's programs closely mirror those of the United Kingdom.

Dominica Scouts participate in numerous Caribbean camps and hosted the 1994 Caribbean Jamboree.

== See also ==
- The Girl Guides Association of Dominica
