= The Girl Guides Association of Dominica =

- Country: Dominica
- Founded: 1929
- Membership: 376
- Affiliation: World Association of Girl Guides and Girl Scouts

The Girl Guides Association of Dominica (GGAD) is the national Guiding organization of Dominica. It serves 376 members (as of 2003). Founded in 1929, the girls-only organization became an associate member of the World Association of Girl Guides and Girl Scouts in 1987 and a full member in 2008. At present there are eight districts in Dominica comprising 27 units.

GGAD was established in 1929 and is the largest organization of girls and young women in Dominica with more than 400 members. The Association is run by a council headed by a president. The Chief Guide is the wife of the President of the Commonwealth of Dominica and her role is ceremonial. The Association is run by a council headed by a president.

== History ==
In 1967 Phyllis (Shillingford) Garraway was awarded an MBE for services to the community and to the Girl Guide Movement.

== Program ==
The association is divided in four sections according to age:

- Brownies - ages 6 ½ to 10 ½
- Guides - ages 10 ½ to 15
- Rangers - ages 14 to 21
- Young Leaders - ages 18 and older

== See also ==
- The Scout Association of Dominica
