= Scouting in the United States Virgin Islands =

Scouting in the United States Virgin Islands has a long history, from the 1920s to the present day, serving thousands of youth in programs that suit the environment in which they live.

== Boy Scouts of America ==
=== Boy Scouts of America in the USVI today ===
As of March 1, 2013. The US Virgin Islands Council was merged into the National Capital Area Council.

The local Scouts are active in the community.

The US Virgin Islands Open/Atlantic Blue Marlin Tournament helps to fund the Marine Vocational Program (MVP) for the Boy Scouts of America.

=== History ===
Virgin Islands Council #410
- Founded: 1965
- Defunct: 2013

Boy Scouts of America interests in the United States Virgin Islands was served in the early 20th century through National Council Direct Service. Later troops were added via the Virgin Island District in the Puerto Rico-Virgin Islands Council. The Virgin Island District was separated from the Puerto Rico Council in 1964–65. In 1965, the new Virgin Islands Council chartered its own Order of the Arrow Lodge, Arawak Lodge 562. Rudolph Valentino (Rudy) Sille Sr. was Scout Master of Troop 17, and later Troop 100, in Saint Thomas, U.S. Virgin Islands from the 1970s to the 1990s.

During the late 1960s and early 1970s, Troop 152, sponsored by Saint Patrick's Church, Frederiksted, Saint Croix, formed a steel band of grammar-school-age Scouts that was managed by Vivian Bennerson. The band toured internationally.

As of 2004, the Great House in Estate Diamond, Saint Croix that served as council headquarters was deserted; possibly the destruction of Hurricane Hugo caused its abandonment. As of March 1, 2013, the Virgin Island Council was merged into the National Capital Area Council, headquarters in Bethesda, Maryland, and the postal initials "VI" were added to the NCAC council shoulder patch.

Arawak Lodge 562, named after a pre-Columbian Caribbean tribe, was the lodge for Arrowmen in the United States Virgin Islands during the time Virgin Islands Council was independent

=== Camp Howard M. Wall ===
Camp Howard M. Wall
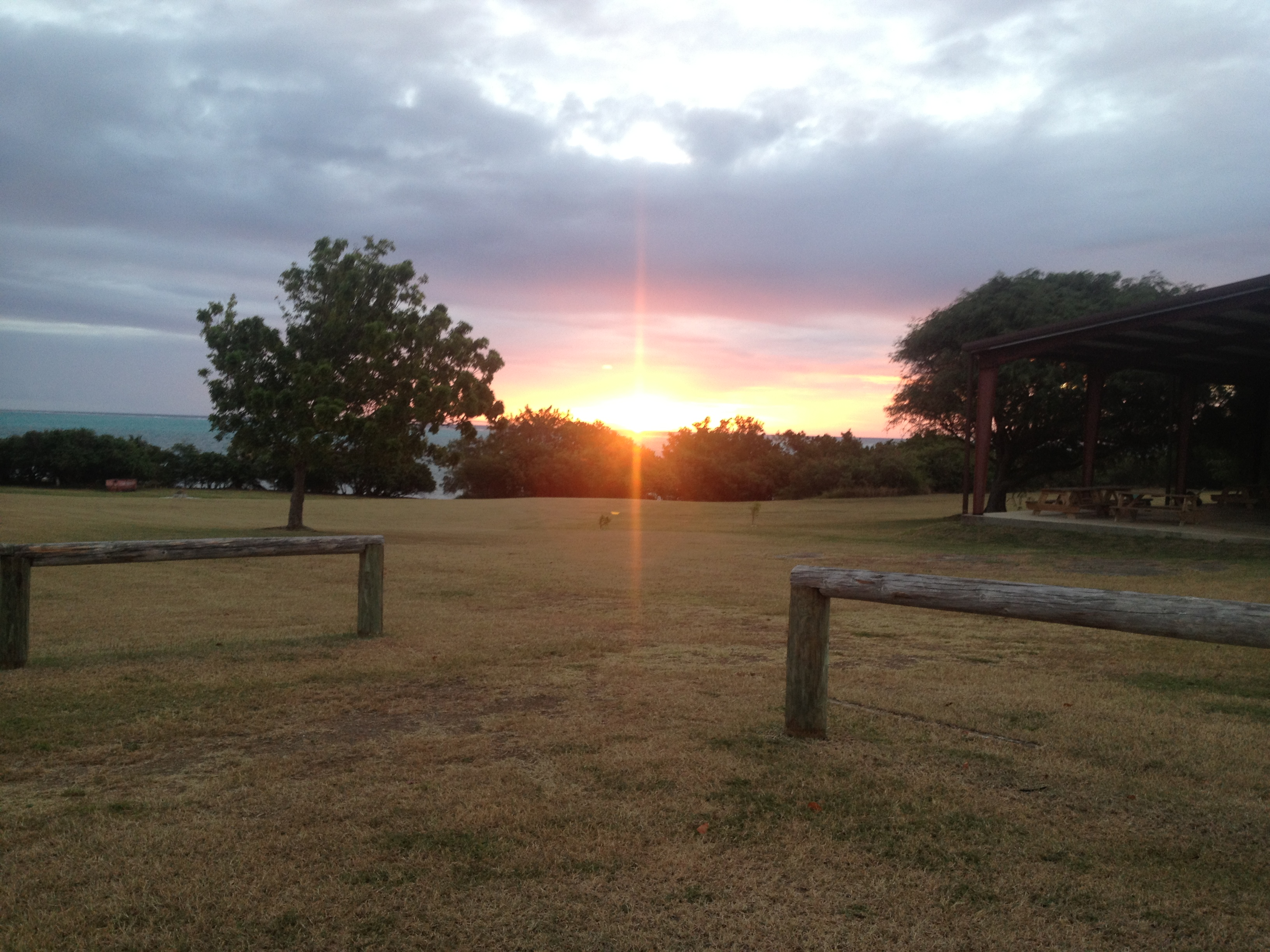

- Location: Boy Scout Camp, Christiansted; Saint Croix, 00820 USVI
- Coordinates: 17.7167907°N 64.6669458°W
- Camp size: 19-acre (0.077 km^{2})
- Website scoutparadise.org

Named for Howard M. Wall, who added the estates Fareham, Petronella, and Longford to the Castle Nugent Farms cattle ranch in 1951, the Camp Howard M. Wall at Milord Point Beach on Route 62 at Great Pond Bay, in Estate Fareham, USVI is on the southeast end of Saint Croix. The camp is "located at the west side of Great Pond Bay." The camp offers bunkhouses intended to accommodate eight people per room, a shower house with gender segregated facilities, and a dining hall. Other facilities include a climbing tower, ropes course, central pavilion, and rifle range.

In addition to "summer" camps, Camp Wall is actually open for summer camp type programs year round, other Scouting events take place there.

The camp has also hosted events not connected to Scouting. Since 2016 Catch The Vision International has sponsored an annual mission trip where participants stay at the camp. On June 21, 2012, at the camp the Virgin Islands National Guard hosted Shadow Warriors Fun Day, which included meeting Kofi Kingston. On June 25–30, 2012 at the camp the US Virgin Islands National Guard Youth Program held the St. Croix Youth Leadership Camp.

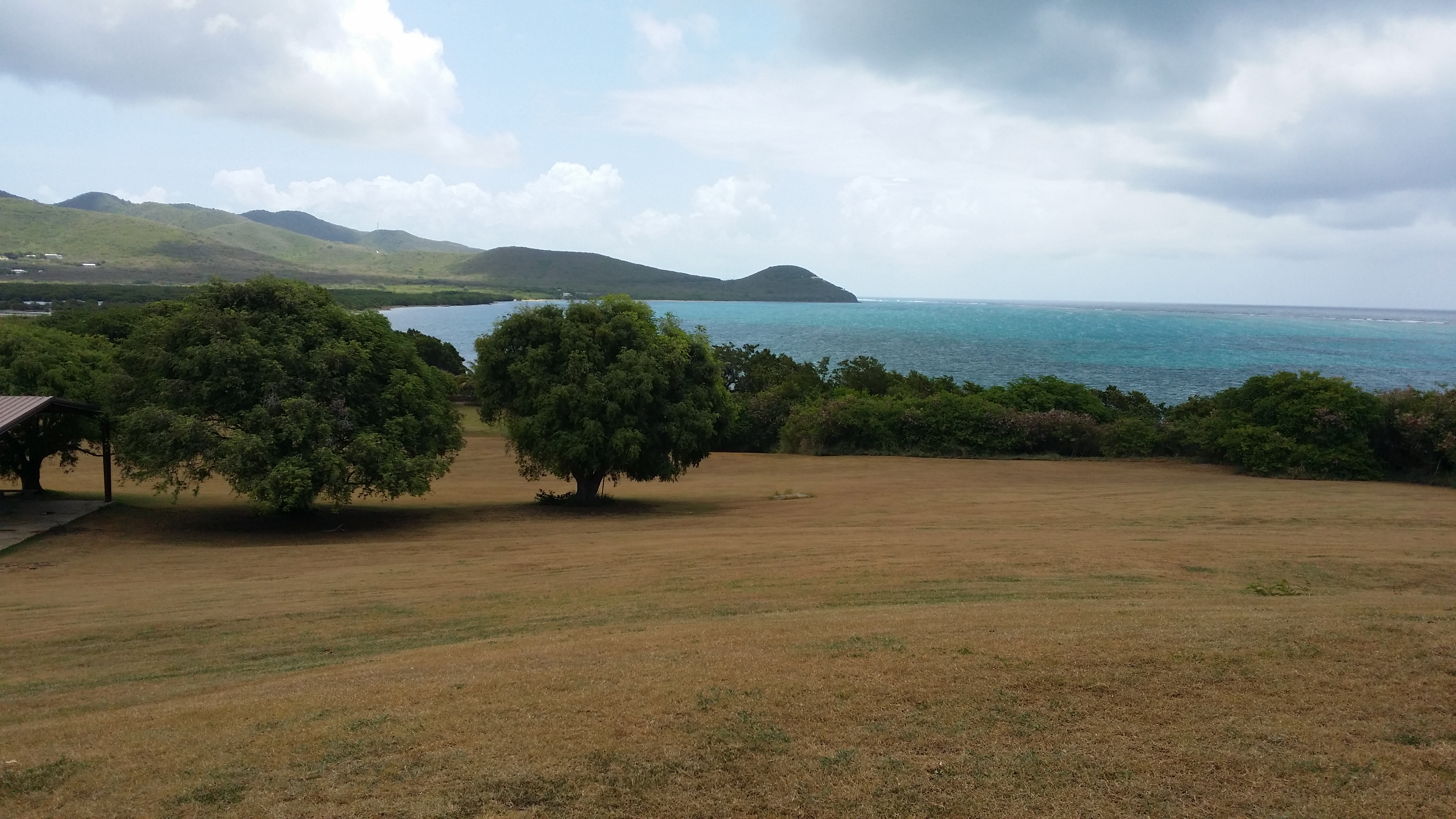
View of camp facing Great Pond Bay

== Girl Scouts of the USA ==
Girl Scouting in the United States Virgin Islands is administered by the USA Girl Scouts Overseas—U.S. Virgin Islands of the Girl Scouts of the USA

== See also ==
- Scouting and Guiding in the British Virgin Islands
- Boy Scouts of America Puerto Rico Council
