= Scouting and Guiding on Saint Helena, Ascension and Tristan da Cunha =

Scouting movement in Saint Helena

The Scout emblem incorporates elements of the coat of arms of Saint Helena with a map of Ascension Island.

Scouting and Guiding in Saint Helena, Ascension and Tristan da Cunha is administered by the United Kingdom Scout Association and Girlguiding UK, due to Saint Helena, Ascension and Tristan da Cunha's affiliations as a British Overseas Territory.

== History ==
Scouting was established on Saint Helena island in 1912. Scouting was established on Ascension Island in November 1973.

Lord and Lady Baden-Powell visited the Scouts on Saint Helena on the return from their 1937 tour of Africa. The visit is described in Lord Baden-Powell's book entitled African Adventures.

== Scouting ==
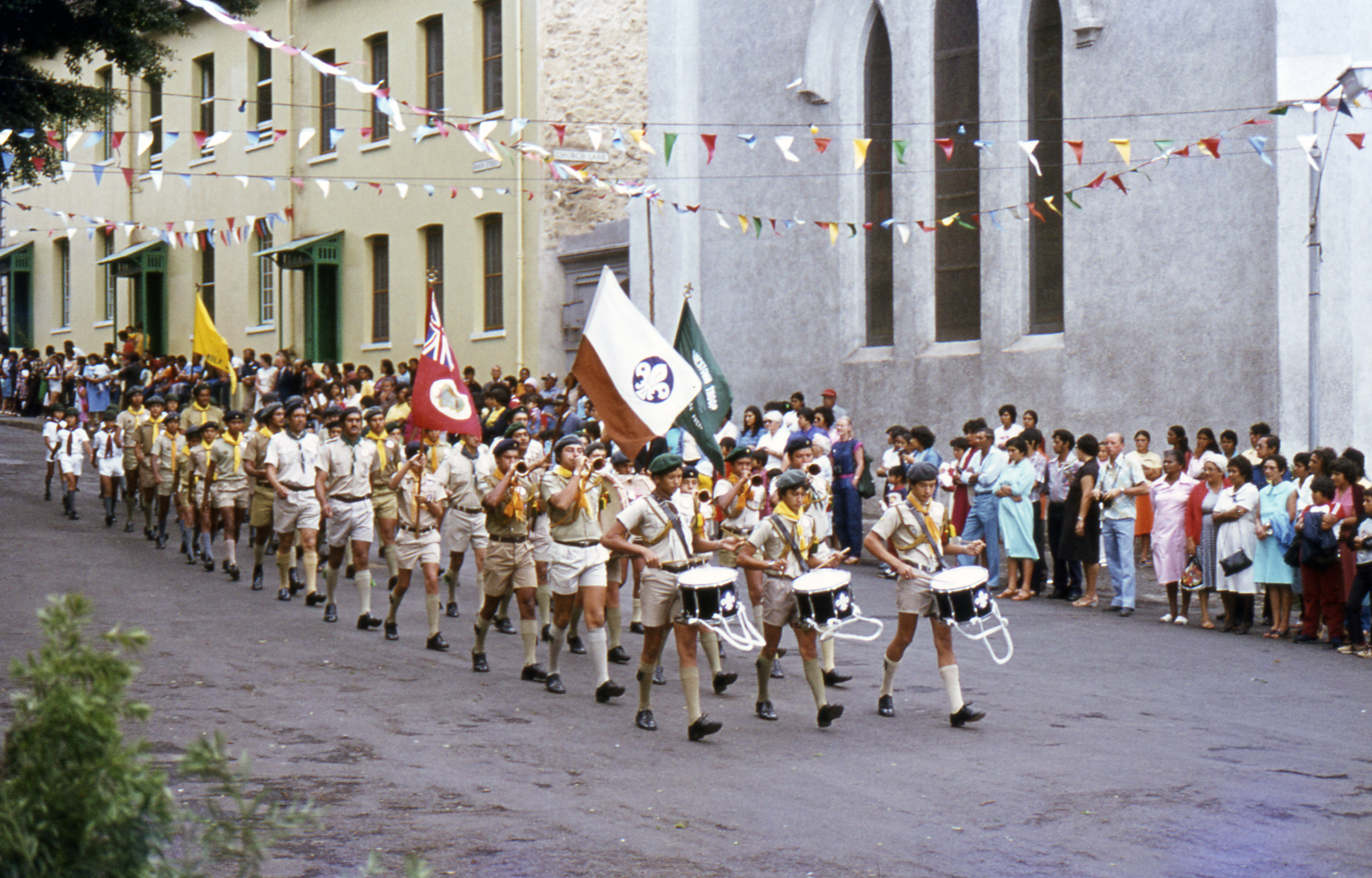
The 1st Jamestown Scout Group at a Saint Helena's Day parade in 1984.

There are four groups on the two most populated islands (Saint Helena and Ascension Island) that are administered as part of The Scout Association's British Scouting Overseas:

- Ascension Island
  - 1st Ascension Island
  - Ascension Island Explorer Scout Unit
- Saint Helena
  - 1st Jamestown
  - Jamestown Explorer Scout Unit
- Tristan da Cunha
  - No Scout or Guide group exists.

Although the programme activities are taken from the British system, Saint Helena and Ascension Island Scouting is geared to the local way of life. Training for Wood Badge and leader training are conducted with the help of British and nearby affiliated Scout associations. Saint Helena and Ascension Island Scouts participate in numerous camps and events.

The Helenian and Ascension Scout Oath and Law, as well as other Scouting requirements, are the same as those of the United Kingdom.

== Girl Guiding ==
Girlguiding Saint Helena
- Country: Saint Helena
- Chief Guide: Tracy Foster

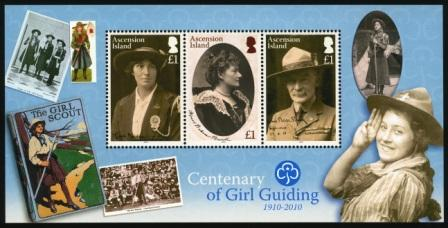
Girl Guides were featured on stamps issued on Ascension Island in 1985.

Girlguiding Saint Helena (formerly the Saint Helena Girl Guide Association) is a Guiding organization in Saint Helena and Ascension Island. Since 2024, it was announced that it is administered as part of the Girlguiding North West England region of Girlguiding UK. It is represented by Girlguiding UK at World Association of Girl Guides and Girl Scouts (WAGGGS) level and Girlguiding UK's Chief Guide is also Chief Guide for Girlguiding Saint Helena.

In 2008, there were about 70 Girl Guides on Saint Helena.

The programme is a modified form of Guiding in the United Kingdom, adapted to suit local conditions, with the same promise, and Rainbow, Brownie, Guide and Ranger groups.
