= World Organization of the Scout Movement =

International Scout organization

- Previous name: The International Conference of the Boy Scout Movement
- Headquarters: corporate office: Geneva, Switzerland secretary general's office: Kuala Lumpur, Malaysia
- Country: 176 countries
- Founded: 1922
- Membership: 176 organizations; which have around 51.4 million participants (2023)
- Chair: Daniël Corsen
- Vice-Chairs: Julius Kramer; Mori Cheng
- Secretary General: David Berg
- Website www.scout.org

The World Organization of the Scout Movement (WOSM /ˈwʊzəm/), branded as World Scouting since 2024, is the largest and, after the Order of World Scouts (formed in 1911), is the second-oldest international organisation in the Scout Movement, having been established in 1922 as The International Conference of the Boy Scout Movement. It has 176 members. These members are national scout organisations that founded WOSM or have subsequently been recognised by WOSM, which in 2025 collectively have around 51.4 million participants (up from 43 million in 2022), and a reach of 60 million young people. Its operational headquarters is in Kuala Lumpur, Malaysia, although it is legally based in Geneva, Switzerland.

WOSM's stated mission is "to contribute to the education of young people, through a value system based on the Scout Promise and Scout Law, to help build a better world where people are self-fulfilled as individuals and play a constructive role in society".

WOSM operates through conferences of its member organisation representatives, its committee and its full-time bureau, structured into regions. It is associated with three World Scout Centres. A World Scout Jamboree is held approximately every four years under its auspices and it organizes World Scout Moots for 17- to 26-year-olds and previously organised World Scout Indabas, a gathering for Scout leaders. The World Scout Foundation is a separately governed fund, supported by donations, for the development of WOSM associated programmes.

WOSM is the counterpart of the World Association of Girl Guides and Girl Scouts (WAGGGS). It is a non-governmental organization with General Consultative Status to the United Nations Economic and Social Council (ECOSOC).

== History ==
In 1920, a conference held during the 1st World Scout Jamboree at Olympia, London agreed to create a Boy Scouts international bureau. An office was established at 25 Buckingham Palace Road, London and The Boy Scouts Association of the United Kingdom International Commissioner, Hubert S. Martin, was appointed honorary director. The bureau's principal task was to co-ordinate discussions and prepare a second international conference in Paris in 1922. At the 1922 Paris conference, The International Conference of the Boy Scout Movement and its committee were constituted and took over the bureau in London.

In 1961, the organisation's conference reconstituted the organisation under the name World Organization of the Scout Movement (WOSM). Its International Conference of the Boy Scout Movement became WOSM's World Scout Conference ("conference"), its Boy Scouts International Committee became WOSM's World Scout Committee ("committee") and its Boy Scouts International Bureau became WOSM's World Scout Bureau ("bureau").

== Member organizations ==
=== Membership policy ===
WOSM's membership consists of its remaining founding member organizations and organizations recognized by WOSM as national scout organizations. WOSM's rules protect its founding and existing member organizations by permitting only one member organization in each country and locking-out all other Scout organizations from WOSM membership, recognition and participation no matter how worthy or large their membership. Several member organizations are federations, some with different component groups divided on the basis of religion (e.g., France and Denmark), ethnic identification (e.g., Israel) or language (e.g., Belgium). However, WOSM has never required an existing member organization to federate with other Scout organizations in the country, in order to make WOSM more inclusive and representative. There are numerous Canadian Scout organizations but only one is a WOSM member organization (the Canadian branch of one of the organizations that founded WOSM) which has a French language affiliate which is thereby recognized by WOSM. Other than this inherent limitation on WOSM membership, the basis for WOSM membership includes adherence to WOSM's aims and principles and independence from political involvement on the part of each member organization.

=== Member organizations in non-sovereign territories ===
WOSM has member organizations in some non-sovereign territories.

- Aruba - Scouting Aruba: full member
- Curaçao, Sint Maarten and the Caribbean Netherlands (former Netherlands Antilles) - Scouting Antiano: full member
- Hong Kong - The Scout Association of Hong Kong: full member
- Macau - Associação de Escoteiros de Macau: full member
- French Polynesia - Conseil du Scoutisme polynésien: associate member

=== Non-national members ===
WOSM historically recognized some non-national Scout organizations:

- "National" organizations operating outside their original homelands. WOSM's conference admitted and recognised the exile Russian Scouts as the "Representatives of Russian Scouting in Foreign Countries" on 30 August 1922 and the Armenian Scouts in France were recognized as a "National Movement on Foreign Soil" on 30 April 1929.
- Small, non-voting associations. The International Boy Scouts of the Canal Zone, a group in Panama with Scouts that claimed British and not Panamanian nationality was originally placed under the Boy Scouts of America's Canal Zone Council but, in 1947, was transferred under WOSM's bureau. The group had over 900 members in 1957 and existed as a directly registered group until the late 60s. The Boy Scouts of the United Nations began in 1945 and for years there was an active Boy Scouts of the United Nations with several troops at Parkway Village in New York City but only 14 members in 1959. Both the International Boy Scouts of the Canal Zone and the Boy Scouts of United Nations have long since disbanded.
- Directly registered "mixed-nationality Troops" were registered after discussions concerning such troops took place at WOSM's 3rd conference in 1924 at which WOSM's bureau was authorized to directly register such groups. It seems that the discussion at WOSM's 1924 conference was, at least in part, prompted by a letter to Baden-Powell from the Scoutmaster of one such troop in Yokohama, Japan. Janning's troop became the first troop directly registered by WOSM's bureau. Only a few troops were directly registered and the practice was soon discontinued with new "mixed" groups being encouraged to join the WOSM member organization of their country of residence. In 1955, only two such groups were still active, a troop in Iraq that disbanded that year, and the first group to be so registered, the International Troop 1 in Yokohama. The only remaining directly registered Troop is the International Boy Scouts, Troop 1 located in Yokohama, Japan.
- Temporary recognition was extended to Scouts in displaced persons camps after World War II. In 1947, at WOSM's 11th conference the "Displaced Persons Division" of WOSM's bureau was established to register and support Scouts in displaced person camps in Austria, Northern Italy, and Germany. These Scouts did not receive the right of WOSM membership but gained recognition as Scouts under WOSM's bureau until they took up residence in a country that had a recognized national Scout organization, which they could join. The D.P. Division was closed on 30 June 1950.

== Structure ==
=== Conference ===
WOSM's conference is its general meeting of member organizations' representatives which meet every three years, hosted by a member association. Each member organizations may send six delegates. The conference is usually preceded by the World Scout Youth Forum.

Date	Number	Location	Country	Member Countries	Host Candidate Countries
1920	Retrospectively referred to as the "First International Conference"	London	United Kingdom	33	
1922	First International Conference (retrospectively referred to as the "Second")	Paris	France	30	
1924	Third International Conference	Copenhagen	Denmark	34	
1926	Fourth International Conference	Kandersteg	Switzerland	29	
1929	Fifth International Conference	Birkenhead	United Kingdom	33	
1931	Sixth International Conference	Baden bei Wien	Austria	44	
1933	Seventh International Conference	Gödöllő	Hungary	31	
1935	Eighth International Conference	Stockholm	Sweden	28	
1937	Ninth International Conference	The Hague	Netherlands	34	
1939	10th International Conference	Edinburgh	United Kingdom	27	
1947	11th International Conference	Château de Rosny-sur-Seine	France	32	
1949	12th International Conference	Elvesæter	Norway	25	
1951	13th International Conference	Salzburg	Austria	34	
1953	14th International Conference	Vaduz	Liechtenstein	35	
1955	15th International Conference	Niagara Falls, Ontario	Canada	44	
1957	16th International Conference	Cambridge	United Kingdom	52	
1959	17th International Conference	New Delhi	India	35	
1961	18th International Conference	Lisbon	Portugal	50	
1963	19th World Scout Conference	Rhodes	Greece	52	
1965	20th World Scout Conference	Mexico City	Mexico	59	
1967	21st World Scout Conference	Seattle	United States	70	
1969	22nd World Scout Conference	Espoo	Finland	64	
1971	23rd World Scout Conference	Tokyo	Japan	71	
1973	24th World Scout Conference	Nairobi	Kenya	77	
1975	25th World Scout Conference	Lundtoft	Denmark	87	
1977	26th World Scout Conference	Montreal	Canada	81	
1979	27th World Scout Conference	Birmingham	United Kingdom	81	
1981	28th World Scout Conference	Dakar	Senegal	74	
1983	29th World Scout Conference	Dearborn	United States	90	
1985	30th World Scout Conference	Munich	West Germany	93	
1988	31st World Scout Conference	Melbourne	Australia	77	
1990	32nd World Scout Conference	Paris	France	100	
1993	33rd World Scout Conference	Sattahip	Thailand	99	
1996	34th World Scout Conference	Oslo	Norway	108	
1999	35th World Scout Conference	Durban	South Africa	116	
2002	36th World Scout Conference	Thessaloniki	Greece	125	
2005	37th World Scout Conference	Hammamet	Tunisia	122	Hong Kong
2008	38th World Scout Conference	Jeju-do	South Korea	150	
2011	39th World Scout Conference	Curitiba	Brazil	138	Australia, Hong Kong, Switzerland
2014	40th World Scout Conference	Ljubljana	Slovenia	143	Italy
2017	41st World Scout Conference	Baku	Azerbaijan	169	Malaysia
2021	42nd World Scout Conference	Digital		170	
2024	43rd World Scout Conference	Cairo	Egypt	176	France, Mexico
2027	44th World Scout Conference	London	United Kingdom		Rwanda

=== Committee ===
WOSM's committee is its executive governing body, composed of elected volunteers and its secretary general, which is responsible for the implementation of the resolutions of its conference and governs the organization between meetings of its conference. The committee meets at least twice a year. Its steering committee, consisting of the chairperson, two vice-chairpersons and its youth advisor and secretary general meet as needed.

The committee has 21 members. Twelve, each from a different country, are elected for three-year terms by WOSM's conference. The members, elected without regard to their nationality, represent the interests of the movement as a whole, not those of their country. The secretary general, the treasurer of WOSM and a representative member of the board of the World Scout Foundation and the chairpersons of the regional Scout committees are ex-officio members of the committee. From 2008 to 2021 six Youth Advisors to the WSC were elected by the World Scout Youth Forum. The Youth Advisors participated in all of the WSC meetings and were also part of the governing structure between the meetings. There will be no Youth Advisors from 2024.

The 2021–2024 committee set up work streams to address the top strategic priorities, as defined by WOSM's conference.

Task forces include:

- Youth Engagement in Decision-Making
- Sustainability

Workstream Coordination Group

- Project management support
- Volunteer management support
- Monitoring and evaluation support

Standing committees include:

- Audit
- Budget
- Constitutions
- Ethics
- Honours and Awards
- Steering

==== Incumbent committee members ====
Name	Country	Position	until
Daniël Corsen	Curaçao	Chairperson	2027
Mori Chi-Kin Cheng	Hong Kong	Vice Chairperson	2027
Julius Kramer	Sweden	Vice Chairperson	2027
David Berg	Belgium	Secretary General	2027
Victor Atipagah	Ghana	Voting member	2027
Elise Drouet	France	Voting member	2027
Callum Kaye	United Kingdom	Voting member	2027
Steve Kent	Canada	Voting member	2027
Nour Elhouda Mahmoudi	Algeria	Voting member	2027
Martin Meier	Liechtenstein	Voting member	2027
Mohammad Omar	Egypt	Voting member	2027
Christine Pollithy	Germany	Voting member	2027
Marie-Louise C. S. Ycossie	Ivory Coast	Voting member	2027
Jose Vargas	Bahamas	Chair, Interamerican Region	2028
Diana Slabu	Romania	Chair, European Region	2028
Saiid Maaliki	Lebanon	Chair, Arab Region	2028
Franck Ramanarivo	Madagascar	Chair, African Region	2028
Mohd Zin Bidin	Malaysia	Chair, Asia-Pacific Region	2028
Dan Ownby	United States	Treasurer	
Jennifer Hancock	United States	World Scout Foundation	

Note: In 2008, WOSM's conference decided that, starting at the conference in 2011, elected committee members will serve for only three years but be eligible for re-election for one additional term. Due to the COVID-19 pandemic, WOSM's conference was rescheduled from Aug 2020 to Aug 2021.

=== Bureau ===

WOSM's bureau is its secretariat, which carries out the instructions of its conference and committee. The bureau is administered by the secretary general, supported by a staff of technical resource personnel.

A bureau was established in London, England in 1922, moved to Ottawa, Ontario, Canada in 1959, Geneva, Switzerland after 1 May 1968 and Kuala Lumpur after August 2013.

=== Directors/Secretaries General ===
Number	Title	Years	Name	Country
1st	Director	1920–1938	Hubert S. Martin	United Kingdom
2nd	Director	1938–1951	John Skinner Wilson	United Kingdom
3rd	Director	1951–1965	Daniel Spry	Canada
4th	Director	1965–1968	Richard T. Lund	United Kingdom
5th	Secretary General	1968–1988	László Nagy	Switzerland
6th	Secretary General	1988–2004	Jacques Moreillon	Switzerland
7th	Secretary General	2004–2007	Eduardo Missoni	Italy
8th	Secretary General	2007–2012	Luc Panissod	France
9th	Secretary General	2013–2016	Scott Teare	United States
10th	Secretary General	2017–2024	Ahmad Alhendawi	Jordan
11th	Secretary General	2025–	David Berg	Belgium

=== Deputy Secretaries General ===
Title	Years	Name	Country
Deputy Secretary General	1991–2004	Malek Gabr	Egypt
Deputy Secretary General	1991–2004	Luc Panissod	France
Deputy Secretary General	2004–2007	Dominique Bénard	France
Deputy Secretary General	2004–2007	Luc Panissod	France
Deputy Secretary General	2024–2025	David Berg	Belgium

== Kandersteg International Scout Centre ==
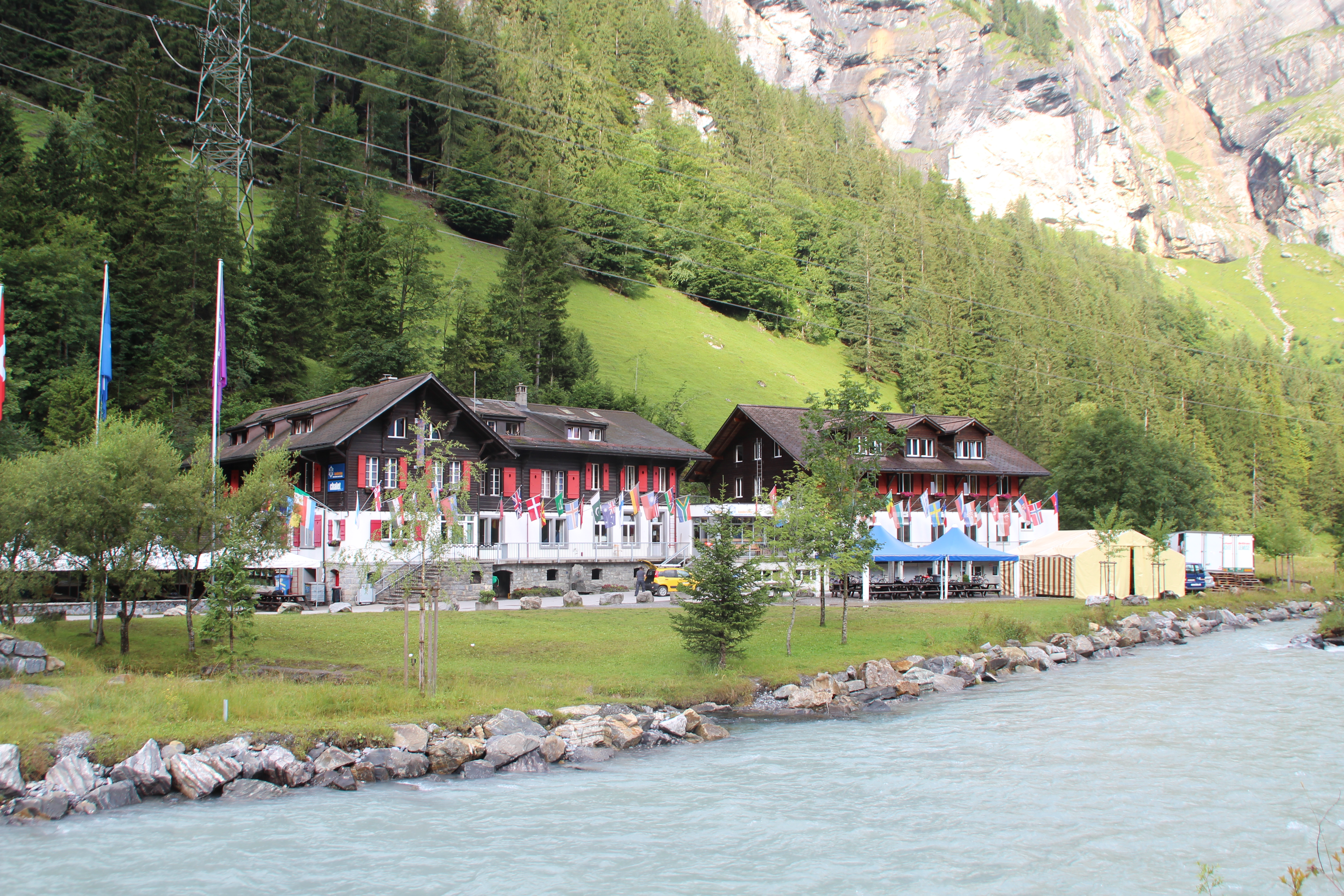
Kandersteg International Scout Centre

Kandersteg International Scout Centre in Switzerland, operated by The KISC Association, is the only WOSM activity centre.

== Programmes ==
The Better World Framework combines the Scouts of the World Award, Messengers of Peace and World Scout Environment Programmes as programme initiatives administered by WOSM's bureau.

== WOSM emblem ==
WOSM emblem
- Owner: World Organization of the Scout Movement
- Created: 1955, minor redesign August 2024

WOSM's emblem and trademark is a purple circular logo with a white fleur-de-lis in the centre with a purple five-point star in each outer lobe, surrounded by a circle of white rope tied with a reef or square knot at the base.

=== Symbolism ===
The fleur-de-lis, commonly with a five-point star in each of outer lobe, is a more widely used symbol of the Scout Movement. The fleur-de-lis represents the north point on a map or compass and is intended to point Scouts on the path to service. The three lobes on the fleur-de-lis represent the three parts of the Scout Promise: duty to God, service to others and obedience to the Scout Law. A "bond", tying the three lobes of the fleur-de-lis together, symbolizes the family of Scouts. The two five-point stars stand for truth and knowledge, with the ten points representing the ten points of the Scout Law.

The WOSM emblem adds an encircling rope, tied with a knot at the base, which symbolises the unity and bond of the Scout Movement and uses purple and white colours. In heraldry, the white of the fleur-de-lis and rope denotes purity and the royal purple denotes leadership and service.

=== WOSM emblem history ===
For the origin of the fleur-de-lis as a more widely used Scout symbol see: Scout Movement.

1939–1955 WOSM emblem

From its origin in 1922 until 1939, WOSM did not have its own emblem. In 1939, its director, J. S. Wilson, introduced an international Scout badge: a silver fleur-de-lis on a purple background containing the five continent names in silver, framed between two concentric circles. Wearing of the badge was confined to WOSM committee members and bureau staff and their past members. The design became WOSM's logo and a purple flag containing the design followed, the flying of which was restricted to WOSM international Scout gatherings.

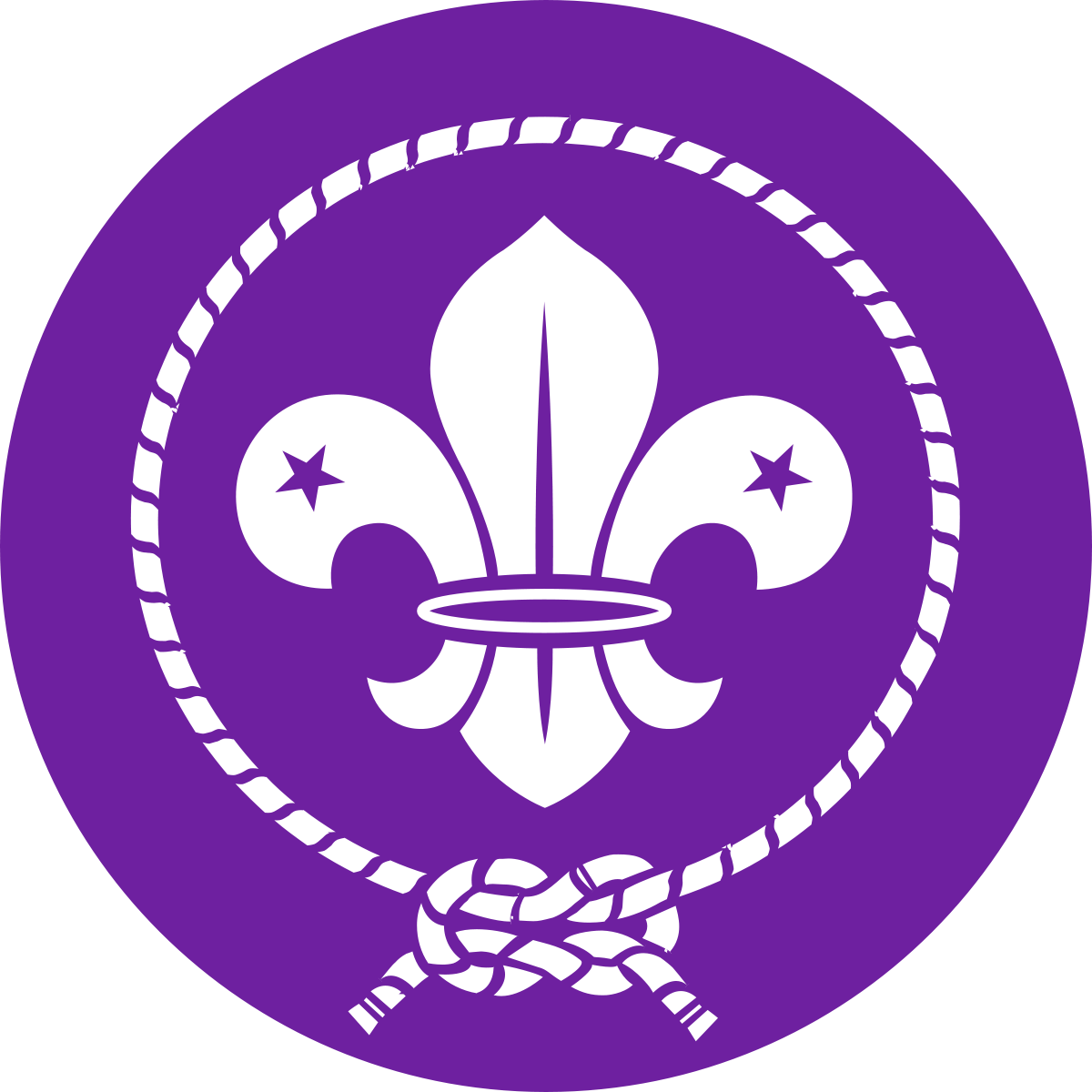
1955–2024 WOSM emblem.

In 1955, WOSM's emblem was redesigned in mid-century minimalist style, dropping the continent names and circles and replacing them with a circle of tied rope in the style of family clan emblems. The redesign was introduced at WOSM's 8th World Scout Jamboree by former Boy Scouts of Greece National Commissioner Demetrios Alexatos.

In August 2024, WOSM introduced a minor redesign of its emblem.

=== Use by WOSM member organisations ===
WOSM's emblem is worn by Scouts and Scouters of several of its member organisations, which determine the manner in which WOSM's emblem is worn.

==== The Scout Association (United Kingdom) ====
The Scout Association refers to WOSM's emblem as its "Membership Award" and uses it as its joining badge for its Beavers, Cubs, Scouts, Explorer Scouts and Scout Network, with progressing requirements intended to help the member understand their commitment.

==== Scouting America ====
Scouting America refers to WOSM's emblem as the World Crest. It may be worn on Scouting America uniforms as an emblem of the worldwide Scout Movement. Scouting America first used the badge as an award for Scouts and Scouters who participated in an international Scouting event from early 1956 through 1991 with requirements devised by each council. In 1991, Scouting America made it part of the uniform for all Scouts and its International Activity Patch replaced the World Scout Crest as an award.

==== Scouts South Africa ====
Scouts South Africa uses the WOSM emblem badge when new members join as a Cub, a Scout or an Adult Leader. The badge is worn on the left front pocket of the uniform, over the heart.

=== Further reading about WOSM emblem ===
- Wilson, John S. (1959). Scouting Round the World (PDF) (First ed.). Blandford Press. p. 210.

== Awards ==
=== Bronze Wolf Award ===
WOSM's Bronze Wolf Award is given for exceptional services to the international Scout Movement. It was first awarded to Robert Baden-Powell by a unanimous decision of the committee on the day the award was instituted in 1935.

=== Scouts of the World Award ===
See article: Scouts of the World Award

== Inter-religious forum ==
WOSM's Inter-religious Forum serves as a working-group for eight main religious groups:

- CPGS – Council of Protestants in Guiding and Scouting
- DESMOS – International Link of Orthodox Christian Scouts
- ICCS – International Catholic Conference of Scouting
- IFJS – International Forum of Jewish Scouts
- IUMS – International Union of Muslim Scouts
- WBSB – World Buddhist Scout Brotherhood
- Won-Buddhist Scout Council
- The Church of the Latter Day Saints

== Publications ==
Publications of WOSM include:

- Scouting 'Round the World: a book updated every three years with details on all WOSM member organizations;
- WorldInfo : a monthly circular distributed in electronic format with the help of Scoutnet.

== Countries and territories with Scouts run by overseas branches of WOSM member organisations ==
Ten of these overseas branches of accredited National Scout Organizations are considered "potential members" by the WOSM (marked by *).

=== Sovereign countries ===
Served by Scouting America

- Federated States of Micronesia - Scouting in the Federated States of Micronesia* - Aloha Council of the Boy Scouts of America
- Marshall Islands - Scouting in the Marshall Islands* - Aloha Council of the Boy Scouts of America
- Palau - Scouting in Palau* - Aloha Council of the Boy Scouts of America

Served by The Scout Association (UK)

- Saint Kitts and Nevis - The Scout Association of Saint Kitts and Nevis*
- Tonga - Tonga branch of The Scout Association*
- Tuvalu - Tuvalu Scout Association*
- Vanuatu - Vanuatu branch of The Scout Association*

Served by Scouts Australia

- Nauru - Scouting in Nauru*

=== Non-sovereign territories ===
Australia

- Christmas Island - Scouts Australia
- Cocos (Keeling) Islands - Scouts Australia
- Norfolk Island - Scouts Australia

Denmark

- Faroe Islands - Føroya Skótaráð
- Greenland - Grønlands Spejderkorps

France

- French Guiana - Scouting in French Guiana
- Guadeloupe and Saint Martin - Scouting in Guadeloupe et Saint Martin
- Martinique - Scouts et Guides de Martinique
- Mayotte - Scouting in Mayotte
- New Caledonia - Scouting in New Caledonia
- Réunion - Scouting on Réunion
- Saint Pierre and Miquelon - Scouting in Saint Pierre and Miquelon
- Wallis and Futuna - Scouting in Wallis and Futuna

New Zealand

- Cook Islands - Cook Islands Boy Scout Association
- Niue - Scouting and Guiding on Niue
- Tokelau - Scouting and Guiding in Tokelau

United Kingdom

- Anguilla - The Scout Association of Anguilla
- Bermuda - Bermuda Scout Association
- Cayman Islands - The Scout Association of the Cayman Islands
- Falkland Islands - Scouting and Guiding in the Falkland Islands
- Gibraltar - The Scout Association of Gibraltar
- Montserrat - The Scout Association of Montserrat
- Saint Helena and Ascension Island - Scouting and Guiding on Saint Helena and Ascension Island
- Turks and Caicos Islands - The Scout Association of the Turks and Caicos
- British Virgin Islands - The Scout Association of the British Virgin Islands

United States

- American Samoa - Scouting in American Samoa - Aloha Council of the Boy Scouts of America
- Guam - Scouting in Guam - Aloha Council of the Boy Scouts of America
- Northern Marianas Islands - Scouting in the Northern Mariana Islands - Aloha Council of the Boy Scouts of America
- Puerto Rico - Puerto Rico Council of the Boy Scouts of America
- United States Virgin Islands - Scouting in the United States Virgin Islands is the responsibility of National Capital Area Council of the Boy Scouts of America

Antarctica

- Antarctica - Scouting in the Antarctic

== See also ==
- List of World Organization of the Scout Movement members
