= Girlguiding =

Girl Guide organisation in the United Kingdom

- Headquarters: London, SW1
- Country: United Kingdom
- Founded: 1910
- Founders: Robert Baden-Powell and Agnes Baden-Powell
- Membership: 290,468 young people (4–18 years) (June 2022)
- Chief Guide: Tracy Foster (22 February 2023 – present)
- Chief Executive: Angela Salt
- Patron: Sophie, Duchess of Edinburgh
- President: Vacant
- Affiliation: World Association of Girl Guides and Girl Scouts
- Website www.girlguiding.org.uk

Girlguiding is the operating name of The Guide Association in the United Kingdom, previously named The Girl Guides Association, which was formed in 1910. It is the original Girl Guides organisation in the world and, in 1928, became a founding member organisation of the World Association of Girl Guides and Girl Scouts (WAGGGS). It is a registered charity and operates the largest girl-only youth organisation in the UK.

Participants take on adventurous activities, such as climbing, canoeing, sailing, and orienteering and have the opportunity to get involved in camps and international events, including girl-only festivals and overseas development projects. In local groups – called 'units' – girls complete badges and challenges that cover topics from circus skills, stargazing and scientific investigation, to first aid, camping and community action.

Each year, it publishes the Girls' Attitudes Survey, which surveys the views of girls and young women on topics such as body image, career aspirations and mental health. It also undertakes campaigning, having supported the No More Page 3 Campaign and lobbied the government on sexual harassment in schools, women's political representation and media sexism.

It is supported by around 100,000 volunteers.

== History ==
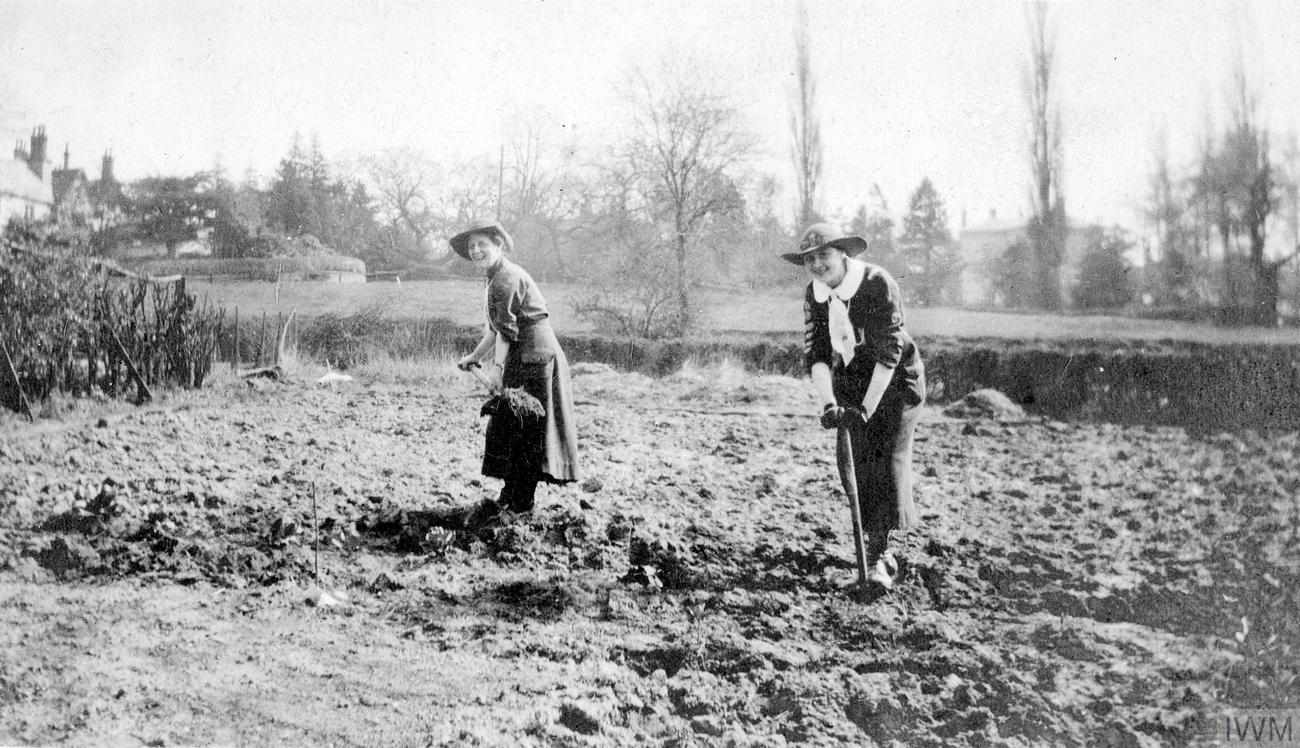
Young women of the Alderley Edge Girl Guides Company digging in the Guides' market garden, ca. 1917

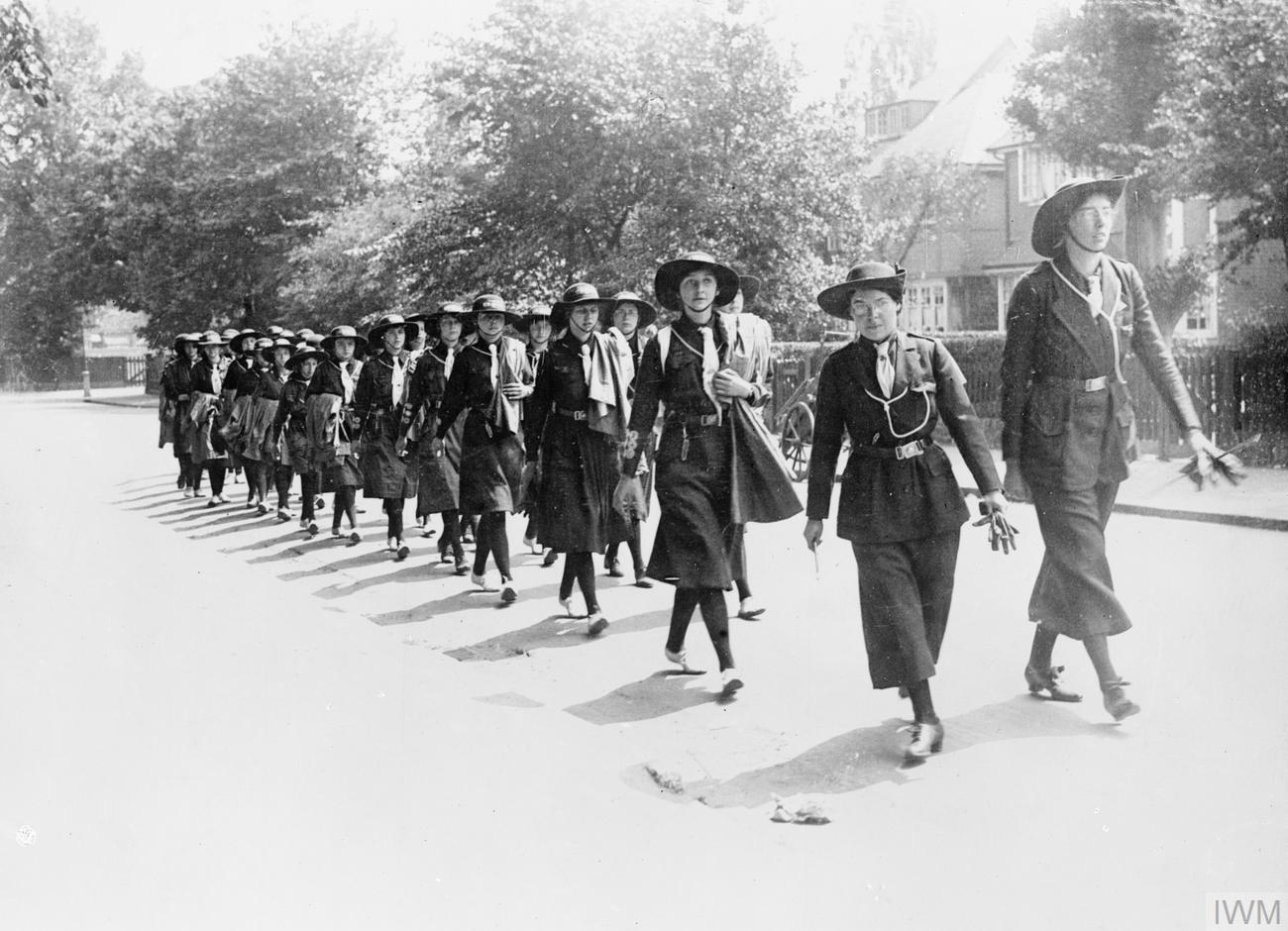
A Girl Guides troop march on the way to do work for the war effort during World War I

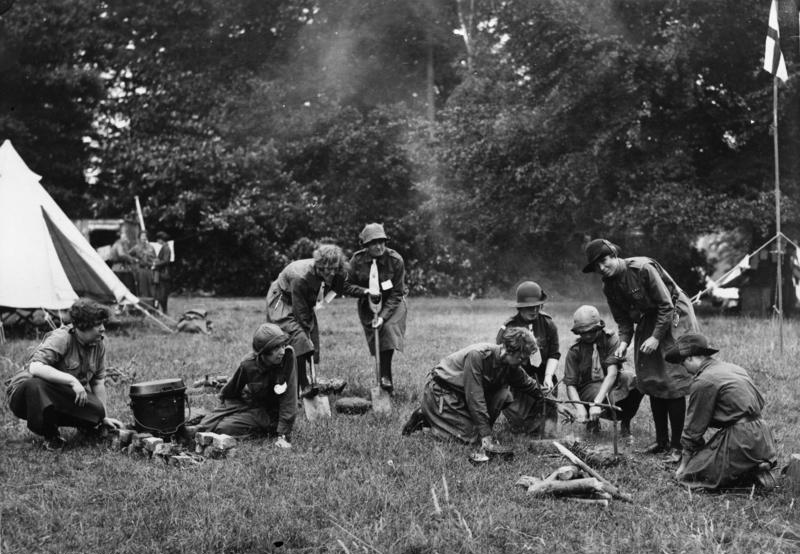
Girl Guides in camp, 1930

Following the establishment of the Scout Movement in 1907, many girls took up Scouting. In 1909, a number of Girl Scouts attended the Boy Scout Rally in Crystal Palace Park. The girls told Robert Baden Powell that they wanted 'to do the same thing as the boys'.

In 1910, Baden-Powell formed the Girl Guides as a separate organisation for girls and asked his sister Agnes to look after the organisation. However, some girls in the United Kingdom continued as Girl Scouts (e.g. see British Girl Scouts).

A few years later Baden-Powell's new wife Olave became involved and, in 1918, the Girl Guides organisation appointed her as its Chief Guide.

The name Guides was chosen from Baden-Powell's military background, "Guides" had operated in the north-west frontier in India, their main task was to go on hazardous expeditions. These men had particularly influenced Baden-Powell as they continued training minds and body even when off duty. As a result, Baden Powell decided Girl Guides would be a suitable name for the pioneering young women's movement he wished to establish.

In 1914, Rosebuds were established for girls aged 8–10, this name was later changed to Brownies. Two years later, in 1916, the first Senior Guide groups were formed. In 1920, these groups became Rangers. 1943 saw the establishment of the Trefoil Guild for those over 21 (now 18) who wished to remain connected with the organisation but could not remain active with a unit. The section for the youngest participants, Rainbows, was introduced in 1987 for girls aged 5–7 (4–7 in Ulster).

In 1936, it was one of the founding members of The National Council for Voluntary Youth Services (NCVYS), which was created with the aim of promoting and supporting youth development work across England. It has remained a member of NCVYS ever since.

In 1964, it established a working party to review and update all programmes. Its 195-page report, Tomorrow's Guide, was published in 1966, with recommendations implemented in 1968, which included new uniforms, badges and awards across all its training sections. Rangers, Sea Rangers and Air Rangers were merged into a single Ranger Guide Service Section.

In 2017, Girlguiding introduced a policy explicitly allowing transgender girls to join. In 2025, following the UK Supreme Court decision in For Women Scotland Ltd v The Scottish Ministers and a subsequent legal threat, Girlguiding banned transgender girls from joining. The restriction applies only to new transgender girl members and does not affect existing members, staff or adult volunteers. A joint statement by the organisation’s chair of trustees, chief executive and chief guide said they were announcing it with a heavy heart, that this was a difficult decision and that this was a decision they would have preferred not to make. Following this, the organisation said it had no idea how many trans girls were in Girlguiding since that is not information that members are required to divulge. In March 2026, Girlguiding announced that trans members of the organisation must leave by 6 September.

== Programme ==
Girls are organised into sections by age. These are Rainbows, Brownies, Guides and Rangers.

=== Rainbow Guides ===
Rainbow Guides or Rainbows are aged from 4 to 7 years old (5 in some areas). Activities are organised around six core areas: Know Myself, Be Well, Express Myself, Take Action, Have Adventures, Skills For My Future. In the 1980s and 1990s, Rainbows wore a tabard in one of the colours of the Rainbow. Nowadays, the red uniform is worn, with Rainbows often referred to as “Little Reds.” There is a baseball cap, cycling shorts, hoodie, joggers, and polo shirt to choose from.

Each girl makes a promise on their enrolment in a Rainbow unit and must be able to understand and carry out the promise. This Promise is a simplified version of the promise that older participants make.

Rainbows can also receive other badges for activities that they attend (possibly with other units), and other activities they complete within their unit, maybe after a themed half term. During 2008, a special challenge book Olivia's Favourites was produced to commemorate the 21st Birthday of the section and a badge was produced.

At the end of the Rainbow programme, as the girls get ready to move on to Brownies, girls undertake the personal Pot of Gold Challenge.

=== Brownie Guides ===
Brownie Guides or Brownies are aged seven to ten years old. They go along to camps, holidays, day trips and sleepovers. They get together with their friends at regular meetings where they learn new hobbies, get creative, develop skills and have outdoor adventures.

Brownies work within six themes: Know Myself, Be Well, Express Myself, Take Action, Have Adventures, Skills For My Future. Brownies can choose to work on unit meeting activities, skills builders and interest badges.

Brownies units are divided into Sixes, small groups of girls who work together. Sixes are traditionally named after fairies e.g., Gnomes, Elves, Leprechauns; however, many Units have adopted the newer six naming style of woodland animals. Each six has a leader named a 'Sixer' and a deputy leader, a 'Second'. The adult leader in charge was traditionally called Brown Owl with other leaders being named after other owls, such as Snowy, Tawny, and Barn. However, these days, only some units still use owl naming – although the variety of owls has increased much, e.g., Wise, Little, Rainbow. But most units have a variety of themes including flowers, Winnie the Pooh characters, gems or even stars.

Brownies have mix and match clothing based around the colours of yellow, brown and blue. Items include baseball caps, gilets, cycle shorts, hoodies, leggings, long-sleeved tops, short sleeved tops, skorts, trousers and a sash. Brownie units may also wear neckers.

=== Guides ===
Guides are aged 10 to 14 years old. Guides work within six core themes: Know Myself, Be Well, Express Myself, Take Action, Have Adventures, Skills For My Future. Guides can choose to work on unit meeting activities, skills builders and interest badges. They take part in indoor and outdoor activities that challenge them to do their best. Guides choose and plan most of their own activities, which can include themed evenings and trips.

Guide units meet regularly, usually once a week during school terms. There are often other opportunities for Guides to take part in special activities and events throughout the year. Many Guide units go away on holiday, to camp or on overnight sleepovers.

Guides work in small groups between 4 and 8 called a patrol. Patrol names vary between different units but include flowers, like rose and poppy, animals, like panda and parrot and famous landmarks, like pyramids. Each patrol is run by a patrol leader who is assisted by her patrol seconder. The Patrol Leader can be elected by her patrol, elected by the whole unit or chosen by the leadership team. The Patrol Leader is given extra assistance from the leader team to develop her Leadership skills.

=== Rangers and Young Leaders (previously known as Senior Section) ===
For girls between 14 and 18 years old, there are a variety of schemes and groups to choose from.

- Young Leaders work with Rainbows, Brownies or Guides. They can work towards the Young Leadership Qualification as well as other Rangers opportunities.
- Rangers meet together to plan and carry out activities, they may work towards any opportunities available to Rangers.
- Duke of Edinburgh's Award Participant: a Ranger who has chosen to focus on the Duke of Edinburgh's Award.
- Lone Ranger: a Rangers who is working on part of The Rangers programme, but is not part of a standard unit. She may belong to a Lone Unit with other lones with support from Leaders who deliver the programme remotely.
- Peer Educator: (Previously known as In4mer) anyone who has undergone the Girlguiding peer education training and continues to run Peer Education sessions
- Student Scout and Guide Organisation (SSAGO): For participants who are studying at higher education (such as a university or college).

Rangers work within six core themes: Know Myself, Be Well, Express Myself, Take Action, Have Adventures, Skills For My Future. With the new program Rangers have new badges in the same vein as the younger sections. This group choose to wear a hoodie, jacket, polo shirt, or smart shirt.

While not a youth programme section, the Inspire Network is available to young leaders aged 18-30.

==== Rangers Awards and Qualifications ====
- Ranger Gold Award
- Young Leader Qualification
- Chief Guide's Challenge
- Commonwealth Award
- Queen's Guide Award
- Residential permits
- Adult Leadership Qualification
- The Duke of Edinburgh's Award

== Uniform ==
Its uniform has evolved over the years, from its first design by Baden-Powell and his sister: long dresses, neckerchiefs (like the Scouts) and wide hats. Another previous uniform was designed by Ally Capellino in 2000. The most recent uniform update was 2026, and was in partnership with HemingwayDesign.

Rainbows and Brownies can choose from skorts, cycling shorts, leggings, joggers or trousers.

== Promise ==
All adults in the organisation make a promise upon joining but youth participants only have to do so before achieving section awards. The current promises for each section are:

Rainbows:

I promise that I will do my best,
to think about my beliefs,
and to be kind and helpful.

Brownies, Guides, Senior Section and Leaders:

I promise that I will do my best;
To be true to myself and develop my beliefs,
To serve the King and my community,
To help other people and
To keep the (Brownie) Guide Law.

=== History of the Promise ===
The Guide's promise has been changed several times to better include a variety of religious beliefs. In 1994, the promise was altered from 'To do my duty to God' to 'To love my God', where the word 'God' could be replaced with a faith's own word for their god (e.g. Allah), in order to accommodate different faiths. Some do not feel it is appropriate for them to make a promise that mentions god, particularly atheists and this has attracted criticism from the National Secular Society.

In 2013, it carried out an organisation-wide consultation on the promise. This took the form of a questionnaire with 44,000 respondents being asked for opinions on each line of the promise (not just 'Love my God') and gave a number of options of different wordings. Effective from 1 September 2013, the words 'to be true to myself and develop my beliefs' replaced 'to love my God', and the words 'to serve the Queen and my community' replaced 'to serve the Queen and my country'. The rewording has been criticised by some Christian organisations. Upon the royal death in September 2022, it was changed to 'to serve the King and my community'.

== Brownie Guide Law ==
"A Brownie Guide thinks of others before herself, and does a good turn every day."

== Guide Law for Guides, The Rangers and Leaders ==
1. A Guide is honest, reliable and can be trusted.
2. A Guide is helpful and uses her time and abilities wisely.
3. A Guide faces challenges and learns from her experiences.
4. A Guide is a good friend and a sister to all Guides.
5. A Guide is polite and considerate.
6. A Guide respects all living things and takes care of the world around her.

== Administrative structure in the UK ==
The organisation has hierarchical geographic administrative areas:

Countries:

- Girlguiding Scotland
- Girlguiding Ulster
- Girlguiding Cymru

Regions:

- Girlguiding Anglia
- Girlguiding London and South East England
- Girlguiding Midlands
- Girlguiding North East England
- Girlguiding North West England (includes British Overseas Territories)
- Girlguiding South West England (includes the Channel Islands)

Countries and regions are divided into counties, which are divided into divisions which are divided into Districts. In some areas with few participants, county, division or district level may be omitted because effective communication occurs without it. Each area is led by a commissioner.

== Operations outside the United Kingdom ==
The organisation operates outside the United Kingdom with branches in nine British overseas territories, using programmes adapted to the local conditions. Since 2024, its overseas branches have been administered through its North West England region. Most of its branches use different uniforms or lighter textiles.

Branches are active in

- Anguilla
- Bermuda
- The British Virgin Islands
- The Cayman Islands
- The Falkland Islands
- Gibraltar
- Montserrat
- St Helena, Ascension and Tristan da Cunha
- The Turks and Caicos Islands

== British royal family in Guiding ==
In the UK, it has a long connection with the British royal family. In 1920 Princess Mary, daughter of George V became its president. In 1937, Princess Elizabeth, later Queen Elizabeth II became a Guide in the 1st Buckingham Palace Company, which held its first meeting on 9 June. She became the Second of Kingfisher Patrol. She had been enrolled on 13 December by her aunt, Princess Mary, the organisation's president. Also in 1937, Princess Margaret become a Brownie. 1st Buckingham Palace Company was closed at the start of World War II and Princess Elizabeth and Princess Margaret were attached to a Balmoral Company. In 1942, the Buckingham Palace company reopened at Windsor and Elizabeth became patrol leader of Swallow Patrol. In 1943 she became a Sea Ranger, gained her boating permit and took her mother, Queen Elizabeth (later the Queen Mother), out in a dinghy. She became the organisation's Chief Ranger of the British Empire in 1946. When she married Lieutenant Mountbatten, two of her bridesmaids were former Girl Guides of the Buckingham Palace company. Girl Guides Australia provided the ingredients for the couple's principal wedding cake as Britain was still under post-war rationing conditions. In 1952, when she became Queen, she became patron of the organisation.

After Princess Mary died, Princess Margaret became the organisation's president, in 1965. In turn, on the death of Princess Margaret, the Duchess of Edinburgh (then the Countess of Wessex), wife to Prince Edward became the organisation's president in 2003. Following the Queen's death in 2022, the Duchess of Edinburgh became patron of the organisation, in 2024. The organisation's highest award is its Queen's Guide award, created in 1946.

== Centenary celebrations ==
The organisation celebrated its centenary in 2010. The historic maze at Crystal Palace was re-opened on 5 September, remembering the 1909 Crystal Palace Scout Rally.

The Centenary Camp was held from 31 July–7 August 2010 at Harewood House.

The tall ship Lord Nelson made a 100-day voyage around the coast of the UK to celebrate the centenary. The Lord Nelson set sail from Glasgow on 7 June 2010. She has called at Oban, Aberdeen, Newcastle, Boston, London, Chatham, Portsmouth, Falmouth, Milford Haven and Whitehaven. At each port she took on new crew, many of whom had never sailed before.

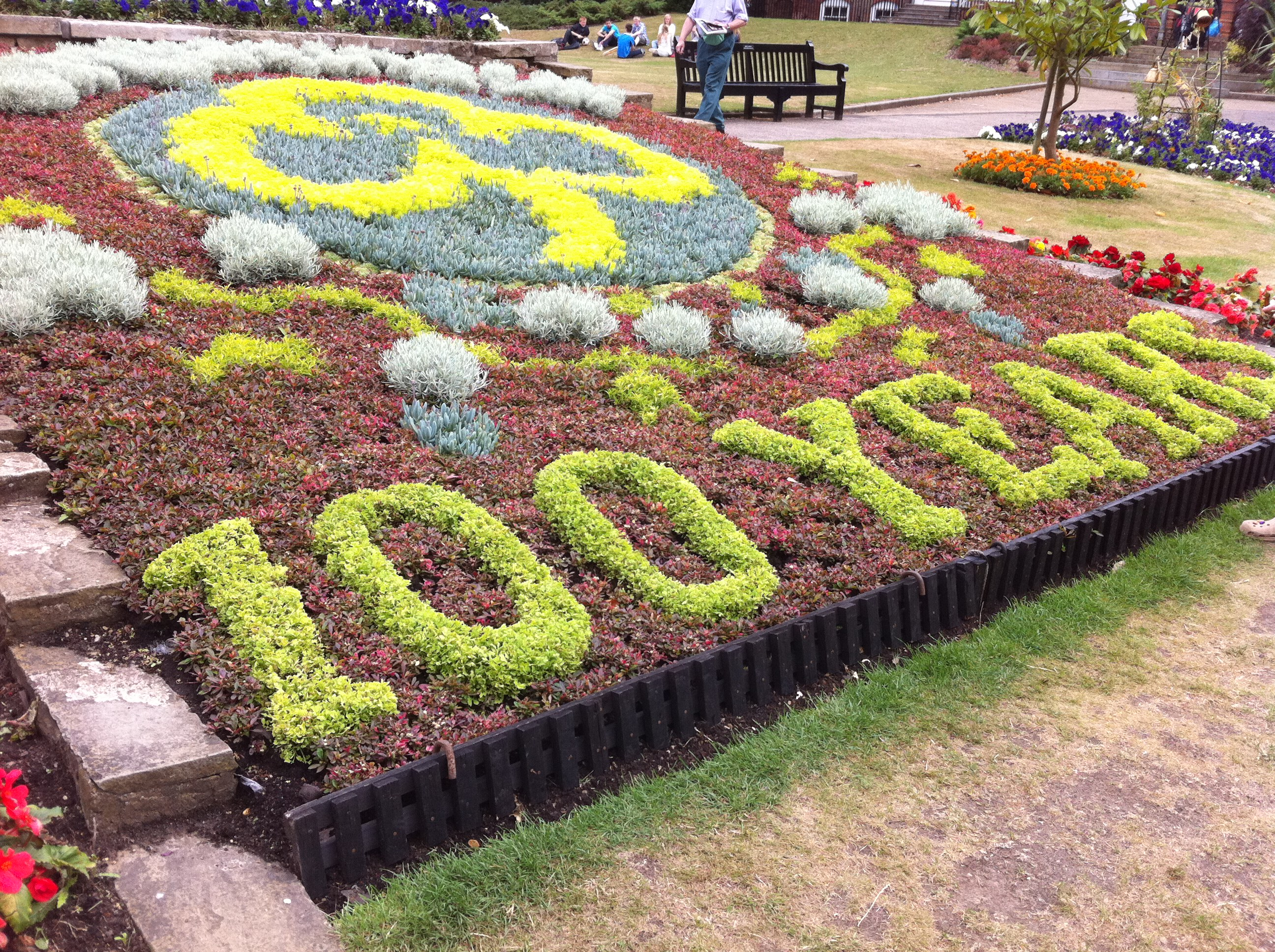
Floral display in Colchester's Castle Park celebrating 100 years of Girlguiding UK (1910–2010).

== Changes to the equality and diversity policy ==
As of December 2025, Girlguiding UK does not allow trans girls to join as members of Rainbows, Brownies, Guides, or Rangers. Trans women can volunteer as Unit Helpers, and in some other roles, but not in positions such as Unit Leader. The previous version of the policy, which allowed trans girls and trans women to join, was introduced in 2018.

== See also ==
- The Scout Association
- National Scout and Guide Symphony Orchestra
- The National Council for Voluntary Youth Services (NCVYS)
- Verily Anderson
- Girl Guides
- Foxlease
- Anstice Gibbs
- Silver Fish Award
