= Liz Burnley =

British guiding administrator

Elizabeth Burnley CBE (born 14 March 1959), née Elizabeth Harrison, was the Chief Guide of Girlguiding UK between 2006 and 2011.

== Early life ==
At the University of Nottingham, she completed a BSc in Psychology, then an MSc in Occupational Psychology.

== Girlguiding UK ==
Burnley first got involved with Guiding as a Brownie and she was also a Guide. She has previously held the post of International Commissioner within Girlguiding UK.

In a webchat in September 2006, she said her most memorable experience as a Guide was "an "incident hike" - our team got lost on a moor, capsized our raft and missed the casualty we were meant to rescue - but amazing fun!"

Burnley was appointed Commander of the Order of the British Empire (CBE) in the 2010 Birthday Honours.

== Personal life ==
Professionally, she has worked in Human Resources for British Rail Engineering Limited and Boots UK. She now is a programme director for Common Purpose UK since 2007. Now widowed, Burnley was formerly married to Roger Burnley in 2000.

== See also ==
- Girl Guiding and Girl Scouting
- Girl Guides
- Bear Grylls
