= Scouting and Guiding in France =

The Scout movement in France consisted in 2005 of about 60 different associations and federations with about 180,000 Scouts and Girl Guides. Next to Germany, France is the country with the most fragmented Scout movement.

== National recognized organizations ==
The national recognized organizations are grouped in two federations and one independent organization.

=== Fédération du scoutisme Français ===
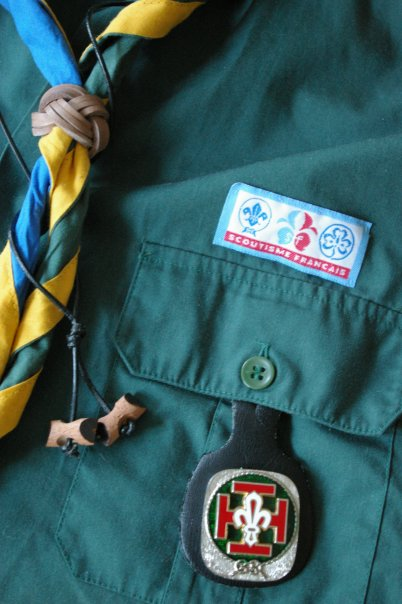
French Scouting uniform (Scouts de France)

The Fédération du Scoutisme Français (Federation of French Scouting) is the national member of both the World Organization of the Scout Movement (WOSM) and the World Association of Girl Guides and Girl Scouts (WAGGGS). The federation has about 120,000 members grouped in five co-educational associations.

Scoutisme Français was founded in 1940 under the Vichy regime. The new organization banned some clubs and gathered others under a broad umbrella. The new club included members from Eclaireurs de France, the Éclaireurs unionistes de France, the Scouts de France, the Guides de France, the Éclaireurs israélites de France and the Fédération française des éclaireuses.

The Members of the federation are:

- Éclaireuses et Éclaireurs de France (founded in 1911, interreligious, 35,000 members)
- Éclaireuses et Éclaireurs unionistes de France (founded in 1911, Protestant, 5,000 members)
- Eclaireuses et Eclaireurs israélites de France (founded in 1923, Jewish)
- Scouts et Guides de France (founded in 2004 after the merger of Scouts de France (1920) and Guides de France (1923), Catholic, 70,000 members)
- Scouts Musulmans de France (founded in 1990, Muslim)
- Éclaireurs de la Nature (founded in 2007, Buddhist)

=== Conférence Française de Scoutisme ===
The Conférence Française de Scoutisme (French Conference on Scouting) has about 35,000 members grouped in three co-educational associations:

- Association des Guides et Scouts d'Europe (founded in 1958, Catholic, 25,000 members). The association is affiliated to the Union Internationale des Guides et Scouts d'Europe
- Eclaireurs Neutres de France (founded in 1947, interreligious, 3,000 to 4,000 members). Affiliated is a number of smaller associations, some of them Catholic:
  - Europa Scouts
  - Scouts et Guides Saint-Louis
  - Scouts et Guides de Riaumont (Traditionalist Catholic, with connections to the Priestly Fraternity of St. Peter)
- Fédération des Eclaireuses et Eclaireurs (founded in 1989 as split-off of the Eclaireuses et Eclaireurs de France, interreligious, 2,000 members). This federation groups about 15 to 20 independent local associations, some of them Protestant or Orthodox.

=== Scouts unitaires de France ===
The Scouts Unitaires de France (Unitary Scouts of France) were founded in 1971 in reaction to a pedagogic renewal within the Scouts de France splitting the former Scout troops (unités) in two new sections and implementing coeducation. The association is Catholic and counts about 23,000 members.

== Regional or local recognized organizations ==
There are at least 50 independent Scouting associations in France outside the above-mentioned federations. Most of them are recognized by regional or local authorities, some via religious communities. They have an estimated membership of about 5,000 Scouts and Guides.

Notable among them are:

- Association Française de Scouts et Guides Catholiques (Traditionalist Catholic)
- Scouts de Doran (Split-off of the former, Catholic), working towards national recognition
- Scouts et Guides Godefroy de Bouillon (Traditionalist Catholic, with connections to the Society of St. Pius X)
- Ecuyers Saint-Michel (Fencing Scouts)
- Fédération du Scoutisme Evangélique Français (Protestant). Affiliated are a number of smaller associations.

== Old Scouts ==
The Fédération des Associations d'Anciens du Scoutisme (FAAS) is the national member of the International Scout and Guide Fellowship.

The Members of the federation are:

- Les Amitiés de France Anciens Scouts et Guides (ADF)
- Association des Anciens Éclaireurs et Éclaireuses (A.A.E.E.)
- A3-Association des Anciens et Amis des Éclaireurs et Éclaireuses Israélites de France
- Les Tisons, Anciens des Éclaireurs et Éclaireuses Unionistes
- Réseau des Parents et Amis des Guides et Scouts de France

== International Scouting units in France ==
- Boy Scouts of America, served by the Transatlantic Council in Paris
- Girl Scouts of the USA, served by USAGSO headquarters
- The Scout Association, served by British Scouting Overseas, operates five groups in France.
- Girlguiding UK, served by British Guides in Foreign Countries
- Armenian Scouting, served by Homenetmen
- Greek Scouting in Paris
- Külföldi Magyar Cserkészszövetség operates one troop in Paris
- Polish Scouting and Guiding, served by ZHP pgK (ZHP aboard)
- Russian Scouting, served by National Organization of Russian Scouts (NORS) and Organization of Russian Young Pathfinders

== History ==
At the end of 1937, France sent Scoutmaster Raymond Schlemmer to the Cambodian, Laotian and Vietnamese areas of Indochina to oversee the setting up of the Fédération Indochinoise des Associations du Scoutisme (FIAS, Indochinese Federation of Scouting Associations) in all three regions.

== See also ==
- Bleimor (Scouting)
- Scouting in displaced persons camps

== Notes ==
The French language knows two words both for Boy Scout and Girl Guide/Girl Scout. Boy Scout is translated as scout in Catholic and Muslim associations, and as éclaireur in Protestant, Jewish and interreligious associations. Girl Guide/Girl Scout is translated as guide in the Catholic associations, and as éclaireuse in Protestant, Jewish and interreligious associations.
