= André Lefèvre (Scouting) =

National commissioner of the Éclaireurs de France from 1922 to 1940

National Commissioner of the Éclaireurs de France
- In office 1922–1940

Personal details
- Born: 1887
- Died: 1946 (aged 58–59)

André Lefèvre (1887–1946) was National Commissioner of the Éclaireurs de France from 1922 to 1940. In the 1930s, Lefèvre set up a training camp for 60 Scoutmasters from all over French Indochina. He was a participant in the 5th World Scout Jamboree in Vogelenzang, Netherlands in 1937, where he was in charge of the French Delegation, inclusive of the Scouts de France, Éclaireurs Unionistes, and his own Éclaireurs de France, and wore an armband on which the badges of all three associations was embroidered. He was a recipient of the Silver Wolf.

Lefèvre died shortly before the 1947 World Jamboree. It is said Ho Chi Minh wanted to meet him when he was in Paris for the Sainteny agreements. They had met each other when Ho was in Paris in the 1920s at the Maison pour Tous.
