= Scouting and Guiding in Réunion =

Scouting and Guiding associations in Réunion

Scouting and Guiding on Réunion is served by at least three French Scout and Guide associations. There is an overseas branch of the Scouts et Guides de France called the Scouts et Guides de France, territoire de la Réunion as well as groups of the Scouts unitaires de France and of the Association des Guides et Scouts d'Europe.

The Scout Motto is Sois Prêt (Be Prepared) or Toujours Prêt (Always Prepared) in French, depending on the organization.

== See also ==
- Scouting in France
