= Conseil du Scoutisme polynésien =

Polynesian Scout Council

- Location: Pirae (Tahiti)
- Country: French Polynesia
- Founded: 17 January 1986
- Membership: 2200
- Affiliation: Asia-Pacific Region of the World Organization of the Scout Movement
- Website "scoutisme-polynesien.com". Archived from the original on 2013-03-19.

Scouting in French Polynesia is represented by the Conseil du Scoutisme polynésien (Polynesian Scout Council), founded in 1986. The first Scout unit in French Polynesia was founded in 1947. French Polynesia became an Associate Member of the Asia-Pacific Region of the World Organization of the Scout Movement in 2001. Membership in 2001 stood at 793.

== Members ==
The council is an umbrella federation with four members:

- Association des Scouts Liahona
- Scouts et Guides de France via the Scouts et Guides de Polynésie Française
- Eclaireuses et Eclaireurs Unionistes de France via the les Éclaireurs et Éclaireuses Unionistes de l’Église protestante Maòhi
- Scouts et Éclaireuses Autahi no te Mesia

=== Association des Scouts Liahona ===
Association des Scouts Liahona (ADSL; Scouts Association Liahona; Mormon; 1700 members)

The emblem used by the Association des Scouts Liahona-SDJ features John the Baptist anointing two disciples.

=== Scouts et Guides de Polynésie Française ===
Scouts et Guides de France via the Scouts et Guides de Polynésie Française (SGPF; Scouts and Guides of French Polynesia; Catholic; 295 members) The emblem used by the SGPF is the emblem used by the Scouts et Guides de France, with "de France" changed to "de Polynésie Française" in orange.

The emblem used by the Scouts de Polynésie française is based on the emblem used by the Scouts de France from 1941. It consisted of a Fleur-de-lis for Boy Scouts, on a cross potent for Catholic Scouts surrounded by a piece of rope tied with a reef knot like in the emblem of the World Organization of the Scout Movement. The design of the "Breton" fleur-de-lys is the work of Pierre Joubert. The cross potent is superimposed with local glyphs.

The emblem used by the Guides de Polynésie française features the cross potent for Catholic Guides superimposed with local glyphs, over a map of the main island.

=== Les Éclaireurs et Éclaireuses Unionistes de l’Église protestante Maòhi ===
Eclaireuses et Eclaireurs Unionistes de France via the les Éclaireurs et Éclaireuses Unionistes de l’Église protestante Maòhi (EEUEPM; the Boy and Girl Scouts of the Protestant Church Unionists Maohi, Protestant, 170 members)

=== Scouts et Éclaireuses Autahi no te Mesia ===
Scouts et Éclaireuses Autahi no te Mesia (SEAM; Boy and Girl Scouts Community of Christ; Community of Christ, 86 members), formerly Mouvement Scouts et Éclaireuses Sanito

=== Former members ===
- Scouts Te ahi nui (Pentecostal; 58 members), dissolved March 2011.

== Program ==
Major activities include Scout camping, celebration of Scouts' Day, leader training, observation of international days, fund-raising for handicapped children, operation of camps for neighborhood children through introduction of neighborhood Scouting, and Scout involvement in environmental education programs. The Conseil du Scoutisme polynésien has procured a campsite from the French Polynesian government on a 60-year lease.

Polynesian Scouts have been participating in international events since 1987, attending World Scout Jamborees and Asia-Pacific Region Scout Conferences. 204 Scouts from Tahiti attended the 19th World Scout Jamboree in Chile in 1998. Noelline Parker is the International Commissioner of French Polynesia.

The Scout Motto is Sois Prêt (Be Prepared) or Toujours Prêt (Always Prepared) in French, depending on the organization.

The Church of Jesus Christ of Latter-day Saints sponsors many Scout groups. LDS Scouts are a majority of the membership in Tahiti.

== See also ==
- Scouting in France
