= Fédération Française des Éclaireuses =

- Fédération Française des Éclaireuses (FFE), an all-girl neutral Girl Scouts federation, dissolved in 1964
- Country: France
- Founded: 1921
- Defunct: 1964
- Affiliation: Fédération du scoutisme français

The Fédération Française des éclaireuses (FFE) is a Girl Guiding movement, created in 1921 and dissolved in 1964. FFE was a founding member of the Fédération du scoutisme français in 1940.

Whereas in France the various Scouting associations were created by religious denomination, the FFE was the only large-scale attempt to create an interdenominational movement. In 1921, it consisted of a neutral section, secular, and a unionist Protestant section. 1928, a Jewish section was integrated. From 1938, it also had a free Catholic section and an unofficial Muslim section in French Algeria.

When the federation self-dissolved in 1964, its different sections joined their male counterparts: the neutral section merged with the Éclaireurs français and Éclaireurs de France to form the Éclaireuses et éclaireurs de France in 1964; the Jewish section merged with the Eclaireurs israélites de France to form the Eclaireuses et Eclaireurs israélites de France in 1969; the unionist Protestant section merged with the Éclaireurs unionistes de France to form the Éclaireuses et Éclaireurs unionistes de France in 1970.
