= Cheikh Bentounès =

Algerian Sheikh

Khaled Bentounès
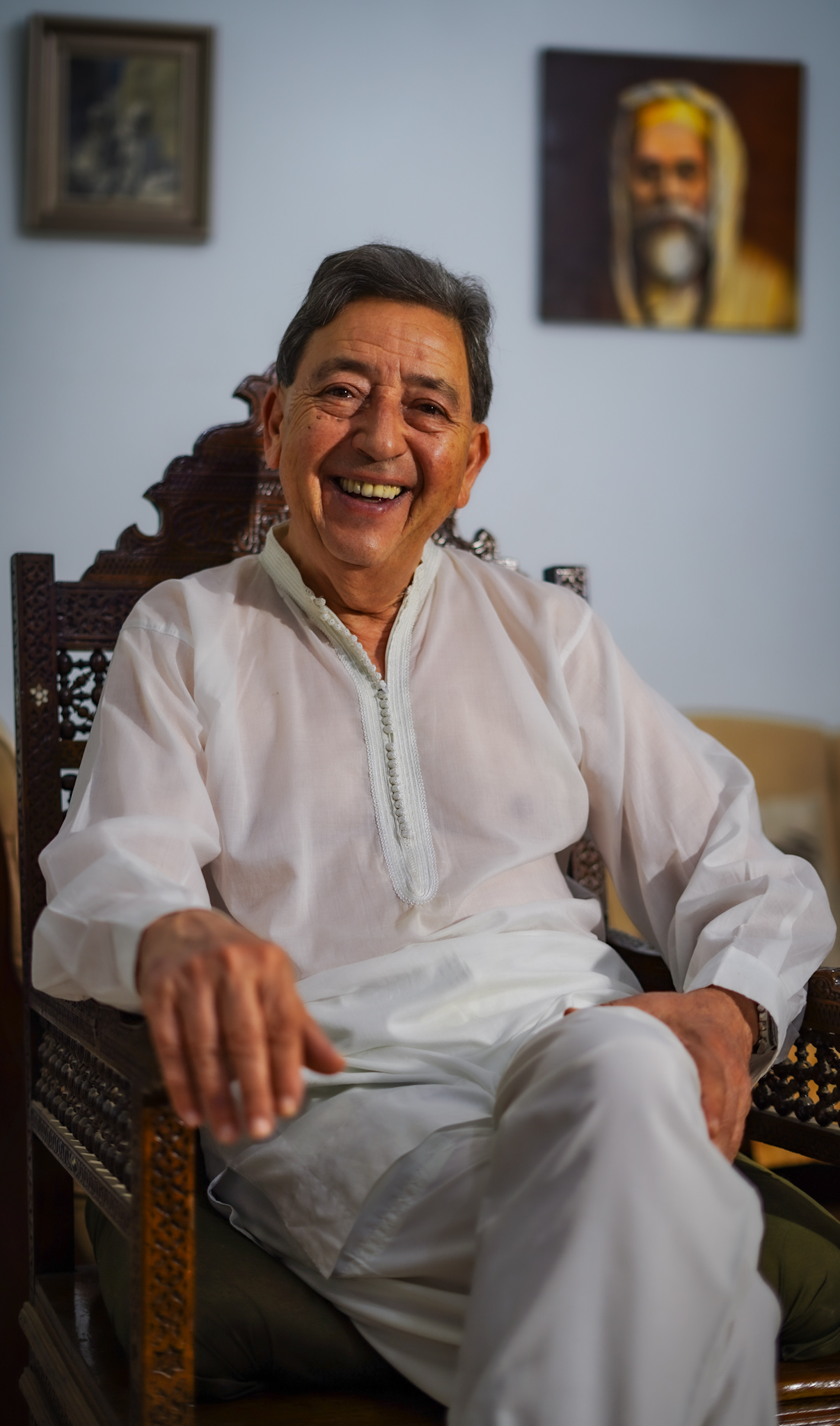
- Born: 1949 (age 76–77); Mostaganem
- Known for: spiritual teacher
- Website: https://www.cheikh-bentounes.com

Sheikh Bentounès born Khaled Bentounès is the current Sufi Master of the Alawiya (officially Shadhiliyah-Darqawiya-Alawiya) Sufi Tariqat which was founded by Sheikh Ahmad al-Alawi in Algeria in 1914. He was born in Mostaganem in 1949. He is the founder of the Muslim Scouts of France. He was a central influence in the works of Éric Geoffroy. He is initiator of the International Day of Living Together in Peace on 16 May every year. This day was unanimously declared by all 193 member states of the United Nations on 8 December 2017.

== Activities ==
An actor of Interfaith dialogue the Sheikh Bentounès founded the Muslim Scouts of France which headed the entire Fédération du Scoutisme Français until 2012. He was also a founder of the French Council of the Muslim Faith. He met with Pope John Paul II in Assisi in 1989.

== Books ==
- Khaled Bentounès, Bruno Solt La fraternité en héritage: histoire d'une confrérie soufie Albin Michel, 2009
- Khaled Bentounès Thérapie de l'âme Koutoubia 2009
- Khaled Bentounès, Bruno Solt, Romana Solt, Christian Delorme Le Soufisme, Coeur de l'Islam La Table ronde, 1999
- Gérard Israël, Alain Houziaux, Khaled Bentounès Le Coran, Jésus et le judaïsme Desclée de Brouwer 2004
