= Guides and Scouts of France =

Guides and Scouts of France may refer to

- Eclaireuses et Eclaireurs de France
- Scouts et Guides de France
