= Conférence Française de Scoutisme =

- Headquarters: Paris
- Country: France
- Founded: 2000
- Membership: 35,000
- Website http://www.scoutisme.org

The Conférence Française de Scoutisme (French Conference of the Scout Movement, CFS) is a French Scouting federation, founded in 2000 and serving about 35,000 members of both genders. The CFS is not a member of either the World Organization of the Scout Movement or the World Association of Girl Guides and Girl Scouts.

Aims of the federation are the common use of its members' possibilities, the preservation of necessary public space for Scouting and the defense of Traditional Scouting developed by Robert Baden-Powell.

== Members ==
The organization consists of three coeducational associations:

- Association des Guides et Scouts d'Europe (founded in 1958, Catholic, 25,000 members). The association is affiliated to the Union Internationale des Guides et Scouts d'Europe
- Eclaireurs Neutres de France (founded in 1947, interreligious, 3,000 to 4,000 members). Affiliated are a number of smaller associations, some of them Catholic:
  - Europa Scouts
  - Scouts Saint Louis
  - Scouts et Guides de Riaumont (Traditionalist Catholic, with connections to the Priestly Fraternity of St. Peter)
- Fédération des Eclaireuses et Eclaireurs (founded in 1989 as split-off of the Eclaireuses et Eclaireurs de France, interreligious, 2,000 members). This federation groups about 15 to 20 independent local associations, some of them Protestant or Orthodox.

The Scouts unitaires de France are not a member of the CFS, but support its message aux familles (message to the families) issued in 1999 and predating the foundation of the CFS.

== See also ==
- Scouting in France
