= Eclaireuses et Eclaireurs israélites de France =

Jewish Scouting and Guiding organization in France

Éclaireuses et Éclaireurs israélites de France
- Jewish Guides and Scouts of France
- Headquarters: Centre National EEIF
- Location: 27 Avenue de Ségur; 75007 Paris
- Country: France
- Founded: 1923
- Membership: 4,000
- Président: Franck Chekroun
- Commisaire générale: Karen Allali
- Affiliation: Fédération du Scoutisme Français
- Website https://www.eeif.org/

The Éclaireuses et Éclaireurs israélites de France (EEIF, Jewish Guides and Scouts of France) is a Jewish Scouting and Guiding organization in France. It was founded in 1923 and serves about 4,000 members. The EEIF is a member of the Fédération du Scoutisme Français and of the International Forum of Jewish Scouts.

== History ==
In 1923, Robert Gamzon, grandson of the Chief Rabbi of France Alfred Lévy, founded the first chapter of the Éclaireurs Israélites de France (EIF) in Paris. This Scouting organization brought together native-born and immigrant Jewish youth, and affirmed their Jewish identity. The group expanded rapidly in the east of France, then in the south of France and in North Africa. Edmond Fleg advised the group and tried to avoid tension between the scouts and members of the consistory.

The Fédération Française des Eclaireuses (FFE; French Guides Federation) was formed in 1921, and in 1928 accepted a Jewish section. The FFE (Israélite) section was also a member of the EIF, sharing local groups and formations.

By 1927 the EIF was publicly supporting cultural Zionism, was cooperating with Zionist scout groups, and was open to all Jews including free-thinkers and Zionists. In 1930 the leaders of the EIF were informed by the Central Committee that they were being "too Jewish". As a compromise the EIF agreed not to mention Zionism among the goals of the movement, but the Scout camps continued to teach Hebrew, practice Jewish ritual, learn about Jewish culture and practice the Zionist ideal of combining manual labor and intellectual activity. The national Éclaireurs de France rejected the EIF as an affiliate because they were too sectarian. Their emphasis on Jewish identity did not seem compatible with French national identity.

The EIF had 1,200 members in 1930 and over 2,000 at the start of World War II (1939–45). In 1939, the EIF were admitted to the Bureau inter-fédéral du scoutisme (BIF) after having been twice refused, in 1928 and 1937. The BIF coordinated the membership of the different French Scouting associations within the World Organization of the Scout Movement. The Guides within the FEE were members of the World Association of Girl Guides and Girl Scouts through the Comité de liaison of the FFE and the Guides de France. In 1940, these two bodies reorganized and formed the Fédération du Scoutisme Français.

By an Act of 29 November 1941 the Vichy government dissolved the EIF and all other non-religious Jewish organizations. The president of Scoutisme Français, General Joseph Lafont, obtained permission from the authorities for the EIF members to continue their activities under the direction of Scoutisme Français. On 5 January 1943 Louis Darquier de Pellepoix, Commissioner General for Jewish Questions, ordered the immediate dissolution and ban of the EIF and forbade their reconstitution in any form.

Many older members of EIF joined the French resistance forming own units; they joined the Organisation juive de Combat in 1944. About 110 leaders of the EIF were killed in action or deported to the concentration camps.

During the Occupation of Paris, many Jews were deported by the French police and Nazis separately from their children in various roundups. As a result, babies and toddlers and young Jewish teenagers were left alone in apartments or wandering the streets alone. For many days, the Jewish Scout movement, having prepared for the deportations in secret and in hiding themselves, came out of hiding and wandered the streets at night in the Jewish arrondissement areas gathering up thousands of Jewish children and hiding them until liberation.

The EIF and the Guides within the FFE resumed their public activities after World War II. In 1948, a group of leaders emigrated to Israel founding a kibbutz and supporting the foundation of the country.

In 1969, the Jewish Guides left the FFE joining the EIF. The association was renamed to Eclaireuses et Eclaireurs israélites de France.

== Emblem ==
The emblems of the organization are:

- The two lions, which defend and protect the Torah. They traditionally symbolize the Jewish people.
- The Torah, which is symbolized by the Tables of the Law (the Ten Commandments).
- The fleur de lys, a symbol of Scouting and the membership in WOSM.
- The trefoil, the membership in WAGGGS, added when the association became mixed in 1965.

== Structure ==
The association runs about 50 local groups in France, served by six regional councils, and one group in Montreal, Canada. Typically, a local group has at least one unit of each of the three younger branches.

== See also ==
- Union générale des israélites de France

== Program ==
The EEIdF works in four branches; all activities are coeducational:

- Branche cadette: Bâtisettes et Bâtisseurs - ages 8 to 11
- Branche moyenne: Eclaireuses et Eclaireurs (Guides and Scouts) - ages 11 to 15
- Branche Perspectives: Pifettes et Pifs - ages 15 to 17
- Branche aînée: Compagnons (Rovers) - ages 18 to 25

== Sources ==
- "Historique". Le Scoutisme Français. Archived from the original on 2019-01-24.
- Hyman, Paula (1998). The Jews of Modern France. University of California Press. ISBN 978-0-520-91929-7.
- "Presentation". Le Scoutisme Français. Archived from the original on 2014-11-08.
