= Raphaël Esrail =

French resistant and engineer (1925–2022)

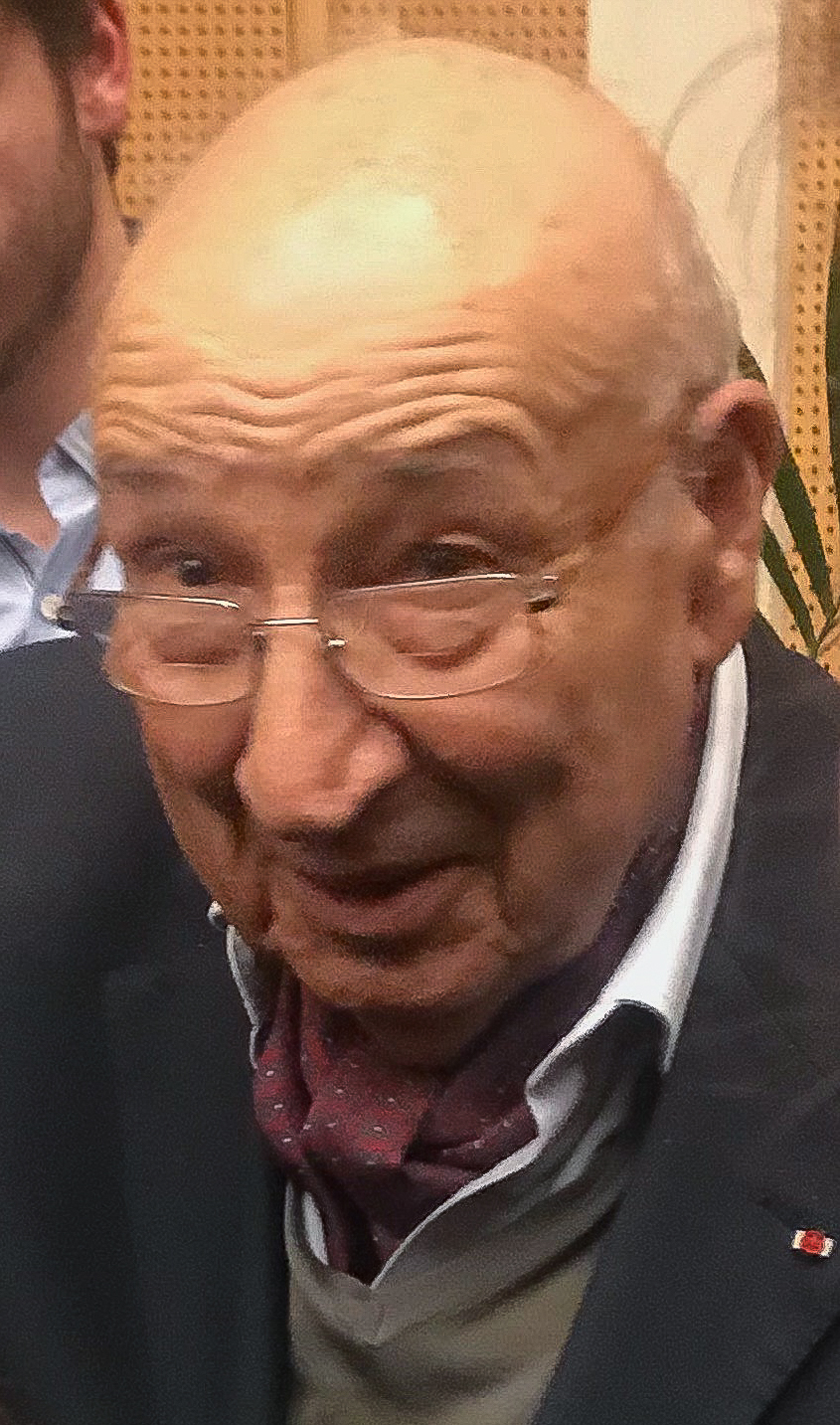
- Esrail in 2018
- Born: 10 May 1925; Magnesia, Turkey
- Died: 22 January 2022 (aged 96); Lannion, France
- Occupations: Resistant; Engineer

Raphaël Esrail (10 May 1925 – 22 January 2022) was a French Resistance member and engineer.

== Biography ==
Esrail was born in Magnesia, Turkey, into a Sephardi Jewish family that spoke Ladino. The family emigrated to Lyon when he was one year old and eventually settled in La Croix-Rousse. While an adolescent, he joined the Eclaireuses et Eclaireurs israélites de France when he began to face oppression from Nazism in France. During the German occupation, he was a student at the École centrale de Lyon and was recruited by the Résistance juive en France. On 8 January 1944, he acquired false papers and stayed in the home of fellow resistance member Roger Appel, who had been arrested six days prior. However, Esrail was soon arrested and sent to Drancy internment camp. He was deported to Auschwitz on 3 February 1944 and assigned the number 173295.

On 18 January 1945, Esrail was forced to participate in a death march and attempted an unsuccessful escape. He was then sent to Dachau concentration camp. On 1 May 1945, he was liberated by American troops in Tutzing. He returned to France and stayed at the Hôtel Lutetia in Paris before returning to Lyon on 26 May, where his family had managed to survive the war.

After completing his studies, Esrail became an engineer with Gaz de France, where he worked from 1949 to 1988. After his retirement, he toured France as a lecturer in order to keep the memory of the Holocaust alive.

Esrail died of cancer in Lannion on 22 January 2022, at the age of 96.

== Distinctions ==
- Commander of the Legion of Honour (2016)
