= Bleimor (Scouting) =

Breton Scouting organization

- Founded: 9 January 1946
- Defunct: 1962
- Founder: Pierre Géraud-Keraod

Bleimor (Breton language for Seawolf), more fully Urz Skaouted Bleimor, was a Breton Scouting organization, taken from the Bardic name of the poet Jean-Pierre Calloc'h, who was killed in action while fighting as a Poilu during World War I and whose death was a catastrophic loss to Breton literature.

== History ==
Bleimor was founded in Paris on 9 January 1946 by Pierre Géraud-Keraod (later founder of the Scouts d'Europe) and Lizig Géraud-Kéraod, on the model of the Urz Goanag Breiz (Order of the Breton Hope in the Breton language) youth movement for Celtic revival in Brittany, founded in 1943 by Yann-Vari Perrot and Herry Caouissin, on the model of the Welsh movement Urdd Gobaith Cymru (Order of the Welsh Hope in the Welsh language).

The statutes of the Bleimor organization were officially lodged with the Prefecture of Police of Paris in April 1950. The goals of the association were stated as "Practices of Scouting and the activities of cultural expression, dances, choir singing, popular music, dramatic plays", without reference to Scouts de France, nor to the Breton language.

The first bulletin, was published in 1947, specified the objectives of the association as "Christian action, Celtic expression, social service, spiritual, cultural and folk formation of the Rovers, Scouts, leaders and Guides of France of Breton origin".

Bleimor merged into the Federation of European Scouts in 1962. Joseph Chardronnet was chaplain of the organization from 1948 to 1965.

Bleimor's flag was a green field charged with a yellow circle and a Scandinavian-style black cross fimbriated with white, the whole representing a Celtic cross. Rectangular as well as triangular flags were used. The Scout movement also used a white flag with a black cross voided through and seven black ermine spots in the canton. The ermine spots had an unusual art déco pattern (a triangle, one vertical and two horizontal dashes).

== See also ==
- Gwenc'hlan Le Scouëzec
- Scouting in France
- Alan Stivell
