= Pierre Géraud-Keraod =

French scout

- Born: Perig Géraud-Keraod; July 1, 1917; Brittany
- Died: October 21, 1997 (aged 80)
- Known for: founder of Bleimor Scouting movement and Scouts d'Europe
- Spouse: Lizig Sournac (m. 1941)
- Children: 5

Perig (Pierre) Géraud-Keraod (July 1, 1917 – October 21, 1997) was one of the founders of the Bleimor Scouting movement in 1946, and later founder of the Scouts d'Europe.

== Background ==
He attended the railroad school of Orléans, to become an inspector, and developed training courses. At the end of World War II, he was deputy stationmaster in Étampes, where he avoided being shot by the Wehrmacht. After the war he entered the Ministère de la Reconstruction (Ministry for Rebuilding) and moved his family in Paris. New to the capital, he entered a Celtic Circle, where participants meet each week, welcome newcomers from Brittany and dance and sing together. Among the members of this Celtic Circle were many Boy Scouts and Girl Guides. At this point he and his wife Lizig had the idea to create a Centre Scout d'expression bretonne (Scout Center of Breton Expression). This center took the name Bleimor, the pen name of the Breton poet Jean-Pierre Calloc'h, who died in 1917 at the battle of the Somme. This Breton Scout Center was created within the framework of the Saint-Denis district of the Scouts de France. The activities at the beginning dealt with Breton dance, song and dramatic art. The first Breton Scout camp took place during the summer of 1946, in Plomelin, close to Quimper. Very quickly Perig and Lizig made the decision to train the Breton Scouts in emergency services, as they considered that folklore would not be enough to form in-depth true Scouts and Guides. At the beginning of 1947, the older Guides were attached to the Guides of France. The older Scouts were for many years within the framework of the Mission bretonne de l'Ile-de-France, which had been created to occupy the Breton young people who had emigrated to the Paris area, in order to help them to preserve their Breton religious practice, which they had a tendency to give up in Paris. The service activity of Bleimor consisted of launching pardons bretons (Breton festivals) in the parishes of the Paris area where many Breton emigrants were established. The day before festivals, the Scouts distributed invitations, accompanied by bell ringers and bagpipes.
