= Larcher =

Larcher is a surname. Notable people with the surname include:

- Christian Larcher
- Francisco Larcher, the current Argentine Subsecretary of Intelligence
- Gérard Larcher (born 1949), French politician, former President of the Senate
- Michelle Larcher de Brito (born 1993), Portuguese tennis player
- Pierre Henri Larcher (1726–1812), French classical scholar and archaeologist
- Rolf Larcher (born 1934), Swiss rower who competed in the 1960 Summer Olympics
- Serge Larcher (born 1945), member of the Senate of France, representing the island of Martinique
- Thomas Larcher (born 1963), Austrian composer and pianist

== See also ==
- Château-Larcher, commune in the Vienne department in the Poitou-Charentes region in western France
