= Rigal =

Rigal is a surname, often but not always of French origin. People with that surname include:

- Barry Rigal (born 1958), English-born American bridge player
- Georges Rigal (1890–1974), French water polo player and swimmer
- Michel Rigal (1914–1978), General Commissioner of the Scouts de France
- Pierre Rigal (born 1973), French dancer and choreographer
- Atanacio "Tony" Pérez Rigal (born 1942), Cuban-American former professional baseball player and manager
- Victor Rigal (1879–1941), French racing driver
