= Scouts Vietnamiens de France =

- Vietnamese Scouts of France
- Website https://www.scout-vanlang.net

Scouts Vietnamiens de France (Vietnamese Scouts of France, ASVD) is a French Scouting organization for boys and girls of Vietnamese descent between 8 and 21 years old. It is an associate member of the Fédération du Scoutisme Français (Federation of French Scouting) and through this a member of both the World Association of Girl Guides and Girl Scouts and the World Organization of the Scout Movement.

== Ideals and methods ==
The Scout Motto is Sắp Sẵn, translating as Be Prepared in Vietnamese. The Scout emblem incorporates the red lotus, the Vietnamese national flower.

== See also ==
- Scouting in France
