= Pierre Delsuc =

General Commissioner of zone Nord
- In office 1941–1944

Pierre Delsuc (September 13, 1902 – 1986) served as the General Commissioner of zone Nord from 1941 to 1944, International Commissioner of the Scouts et Guides de France from 1944 to 1946, as well as a member of the International Scout Committee from 1951.

== Background ==
Delsuc practiced civil law as a lawyer.

Delsuc began Scouting in the 5th arrondissement of Paris Groupe Saint-Louis. In 1929, he succeeded Édouard de Macedo as leader of this group until 1945, though the group split into two in 1930.

Antoine-Louis Cornette asked him to succeed Jacques Sevin at the Chamarande camp school.

Mobilized in 1939, then demobilized in 1940, he took the lead of underground Scouting with François Bloch-Lainé and Michel de Paillerets, banned in the occupied zone. He entered the Resistance and was arrested several times by the Gestapo. Sent to prison, he was released for lack of evidence.

After World War II, Delsuc became commissioner-general of the Scouts de France until 1946, officially occupying the position that he had occupied unofficially in the North Zone since his demobilization. In 1951, he was awarded the sixth Bronze Wolf, the only distinction of the World Organization of the Scout Movement, awarded by the World Scout Committee for exceptional services to world Scouting.

In opposition to Michel Rigal, the Commissioner-General, he resigned from the National Council of the Scouts de France in 1958. Their opposition became public in June 1960 when he denounced Rigal's position in a letter published by France catholique, a moderate Catholic weekly, over the Algerian War.

In March 1964, Monsignor Marc-Armand Lallier, as president of the Episcopal Commission for Youth, was asked by Delsuc, Pierre de Montjamont, Henry Dhavernas and Michel Menu to intervene to mitigate some of the radical changes underway in French Scouting, along with other bishops involved in Scouting, with the exception of Bishop Jean Rupp. Hostile to the pedagogical reform of 1964, he favored the birth of the Scouts unitaires de France and co-authored the booklet Bases fondamentales du Scoutisme.

== Works ==
- Bases fondamentales du scoutisme (with Michel Menu, Pierre de Montjamont and Henry Dhavernas), 1967, also used by the Scouts unitaires de France
- Pour entrer dans le jeu
- Plein Jeu
- Patrouilles en action
- Etapes
- Bivouacs
- La Rude nuit de Kervizel
- Brume sur le Mezenc
- Jovanni (1952)
- Gaël des Glénans (1956)
- L'île de fer - Gaël 2 (1960)
- Port Sterval (1972)
- Eux, les Scouts
- L'étrille
- Tout Ann Héry
- Le refuge du bonheur

Non-profit organization positions
Preceded by Henry Dhavernas	Secretary General; 1940–1946	Succeeded by Georges Gaultier

Non-profit organization positions
Preceded by	Secretary General; 1940–1946	Succeeded by Jean Duriez-Maury
