= EDLN =

EDLN may refer to:

- Mönchengladbach Airport airport code
- Éclaireurs de la Nature
