= Michel Menu =

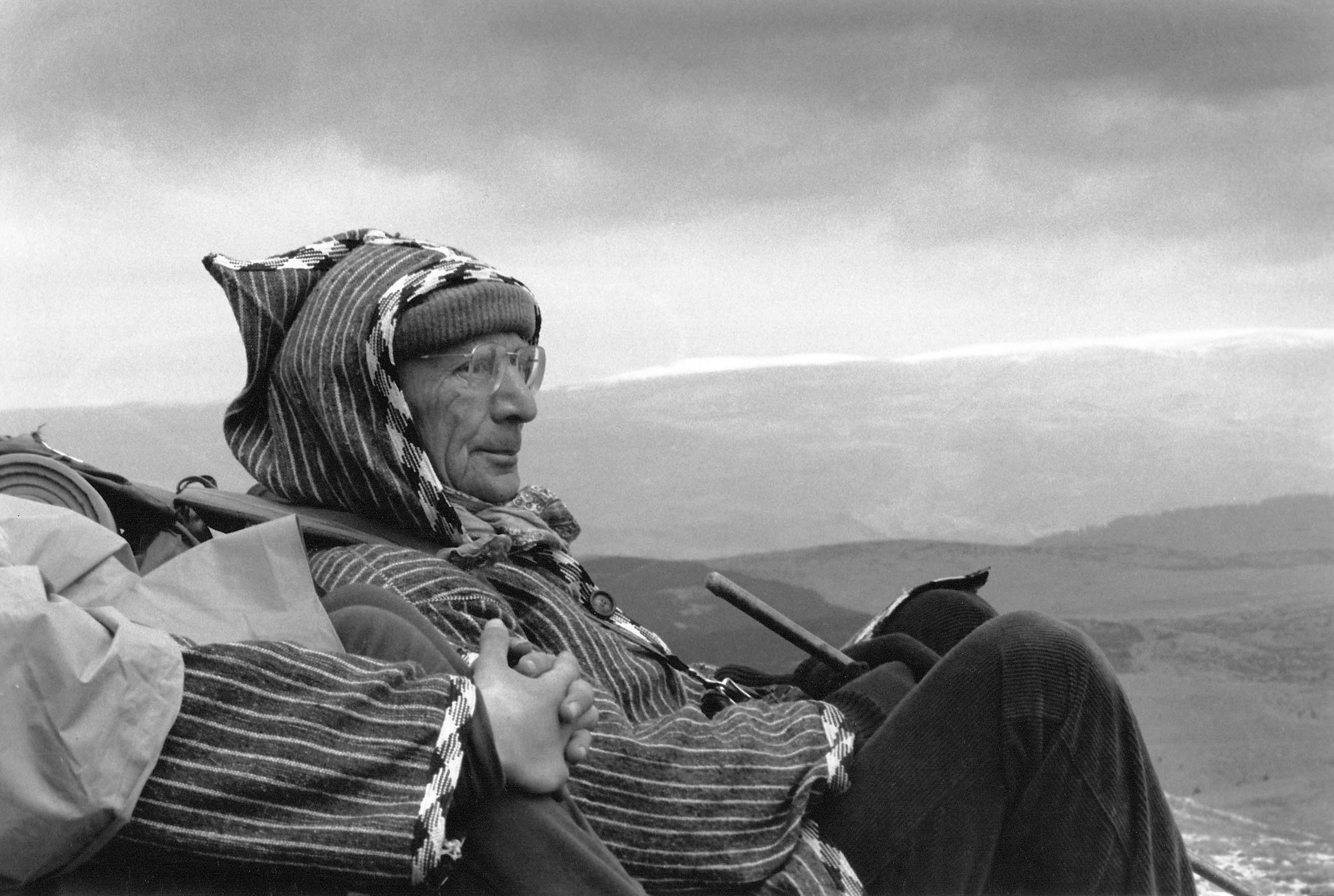
- Menu in 1991
- Born: 3 February 1916; Secondigny, Deux-Sèvres, France
- Died: 2 March 2015 (aged 99); Saint-Cloud, Hauts-de-Seine, France
- Engineering career
- Discipline: Engineering

Michel Menu (3 February 1916 in Secondigny, Deux-Sèvres – 2 March 2015 in Saint-Cloud, Hauts-de-Seine), was a French engineer and author. A major figure of Catholic Scouting, he was the Deputy Chief Commissioner, National Scout Commissioner of Scouts de France (1946-1956), and launched the Raider-Scouts scheme in 1948.

== Works ==
- Bases fondamentales du scoutisme (with Pierre Delsuc, Pierre de Montjamont and Henry Dhavernas), 1967
