= 5th World Scout Jamboree =

- Location: Vogelenzang
- Country: the Netherlands
- Date: 1937
- Attendance: 28,750 Scouts
Previous; 4th World Scout Jamboree	Next; 6th World Scout Jamboree

The 5th World Scout Jamboree (Dutch: 5e Wereldjamboree) was the World Scout Jamboree where 81-year-old Robert Baden-Powell gave his farewell.

== Organizational details ==
The Jamboree in Vogelenzang, Bloemendaal in the Netherlands was opened on 31 July 1937 by Queen Wilhelmina of the Netherlands, with 28,750 Scouts from 54 countries attending. The Boy Scouts Association had intended to bring up to 10,000 Scouts. Given 650 water taps and 120 showers, it was considered the cleanest jamboree to date. The main camp was at Vogelenzang, the Sea Scout camp was at Bennebroek, now both part of the Bloemendaal municipality. The host site was on the farm of the Vertegaal family.

=== Symbol ===
The symbol used for the world jamboree is the Jacob's staff, which was used during the exploration of new territories in the Age of Discovery by Dutch sailors. The ten arms symbolize the ten articles of the Scout Law. After this jamboree, the Jacob's staff became the award of gratitude for the Netherlands Scout organizations. Wooden versions were given to Scouts who had supported the jamboree organization. Later on, the silver and gold Jacob's staff became official awards of gratitude in the Dutch national Scouts organization.

=== Subcamps ===
The camp consisted of 12 subcamps, each with its own badge color:

- camp 1: yellow
- camp 2: green
- camp 3: red
- camp 4: light-blue
- camp 5:dark-blue
- camp 6:red/white
- camp 7:blue/white
- camp 8:yellow/green
- camp 9: orange
- camp 10: green/white (Woestduin)
- camp 11: orange/white (water camp)
- camp 12: white (an insigne without stripe)

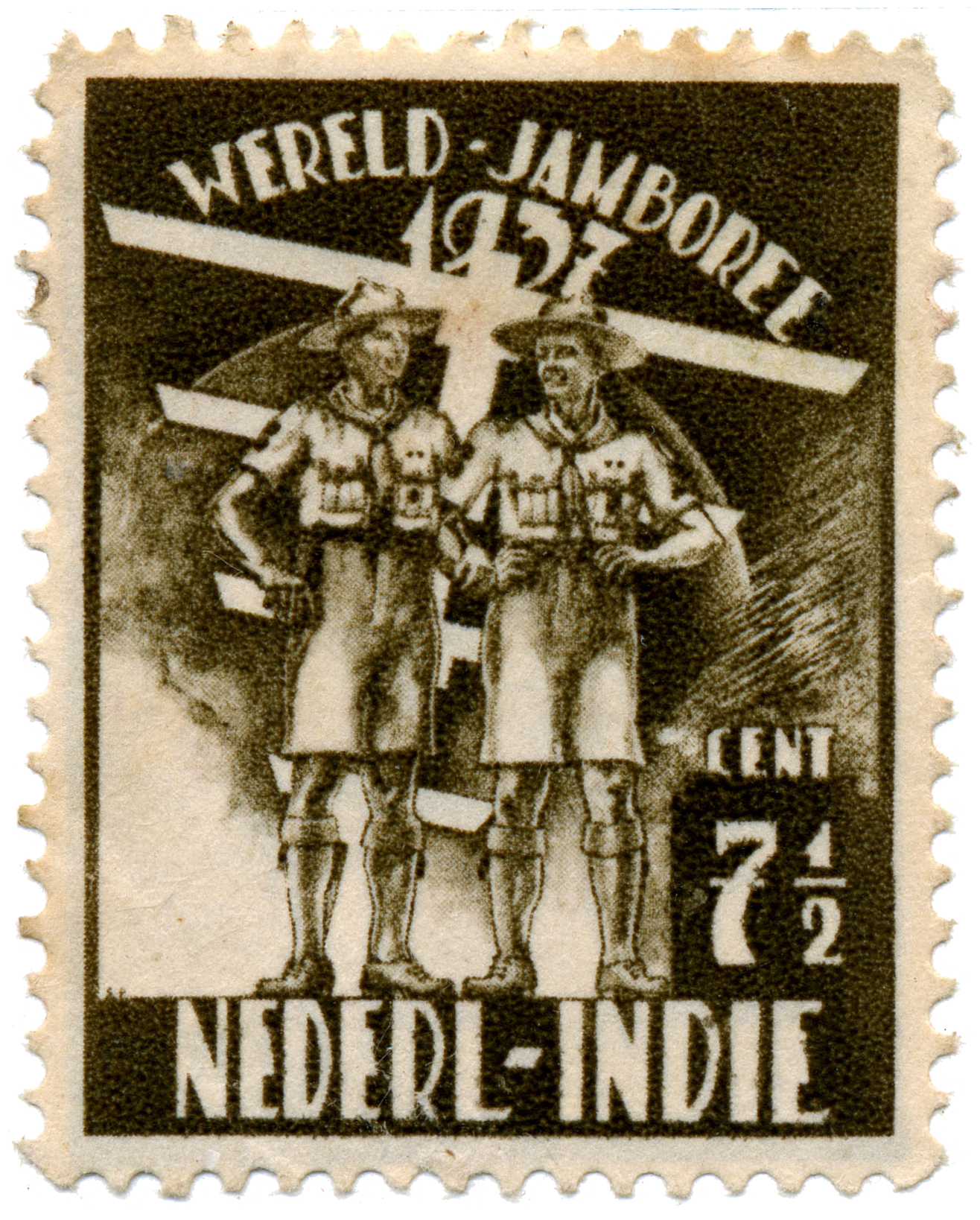
The net results of this stamp was used to pay the trip of the Netherlands East Indies Boy Scouts to the 5th World Scout Jamboree

== Girls and Cub Scouts ==
Although girls did not participate in the jamboree (until the 16th World Scout Jamboree in Australia), they were allowed to give a salute to Olave Baden-Powell, their Chief Guide. Also, a special Cub Scout day was organized during the jamboree.

== Closure and farewell ==
At the closure of the event on 9 August 1937, Baden-Powell pointed out the symbol of this jamboree: the Jacob's Staff and took his farewell.

I am nearing the end of my life. Most of you are at the beginning, and I want your lives to be happy and successful. You can make them so by doing your best to carry out the Scout Law all your days, whatever your station and wherever you are. Now goodbye. God bless you all. God bless you.

== See also ==
=== Notable Scouts/visitors ===
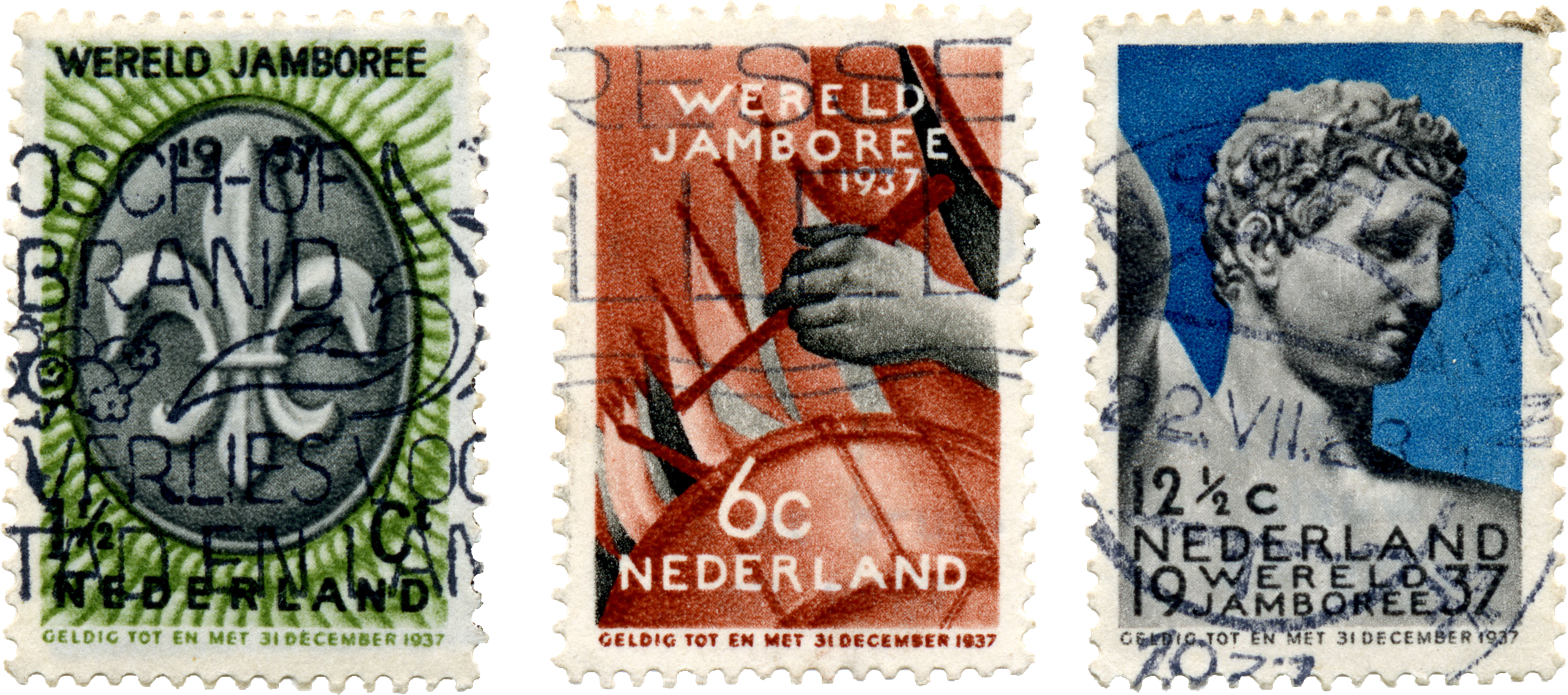

- André Lefèvre
- Jan van Hoof
- Prince Gustaf Adolf, Duke of Västerbotten

=== Moving pictures ===
- Jamboree film (Silent)
