= Éclaireurs Neutres de France =

- Neutral Scouts of France
- Headquarters: Paris
- Country: France
- Founded: 1947
- Membership: 4,000
- Website http://www.eclaireurs.org

The Éclaireurs Neutres de France (Neutral (= interreligious) Scouts of France, ENF) is a non-aligned French Scouting association, founded in 1947 by Marcel Lepage and serving 3,000 to 4,000 members of both genders.

The association has no political or religious involvement and is open to all without distinction of religion or race and respects the convictions of everyone. ENF is not a coeducational or mixed organisation although coeducation is accepted for the Cub Scouts, it has two distinct sections for girls and boys.

== History ==
Some sources argue that the ENF is a spinoff from another French Scouting association, the Éclaireurs de France. The ENF claims on their website that this would be a statement in contradiction with its founding principles of openness and mutual respect.

Although, initially a traditional Scouting association, it has evolved to adapt itself to modern life and standards of health and safety imposed by French Ministry of Youth and Sports, from which it has an official approval.

== Memberships and affiliations ==
Emblem of the Scouts et Guides Saint Louis

On the national level, the association is a member of the Conférence Française de Scoutisme.

Since 2000 a number of smaller associations joined the ENF for official approval, some of them religious:

- Europa Scouts (Catholic)
- Scouts et Guides Saint Louis (Catholic)
- Scouts et Guides de Riaumont (Traditionalist Catholic, with connections to the Priestly Fraternity of St. Peter).

Thus the association has changed from a single organization to a kind of federation of differing Scouting organizations with different spiritual backgrounds which is unique for French Scouting.

== Sections ==
The association is organised in three age branches:

- ages 8 to 11: The pack (Cubs), light blue shirt, dark blue short and beret with the cub insignia
- ages 12 to 16: The troop (Scouts), khaki shirt, dark blue short or trousers and brown smokey-bear hat for boys, white shirt and dark blue smokey-bear hat for girls
- ages 17 and onwards: The clan (Rovers), dark blue shirt for boys and same as Scouts for girls, the tie is a tartan

== See also ==
- Scouting in France
