= 6th World Scout Jamboree =

- Theme: Jamboree of Peace
- Location: Moisson
- Country: France
- Date: 1947
- Attendance: 24,000 Scouts
Previous; 5th World Scout Jamboree	Next; 7th World Scout Jamboree

The 6th World Scout Jamboree (French: Jamboree mondial de la paix) was held in 1947 and was hosted by France at Moisson. This was the first jamboree to have been held after Baden-Powell's death in 1941. It was originally planned to take place in 1941 in France.

== Unofficial theme ==
Following the devastation of World War II, this event was aptly named the Jamboree of Peace. The Jamboree showed that even through the years of the war, the Scout Movement was still strong and growing. 24,152 Scouts attended the event from 38 countries.

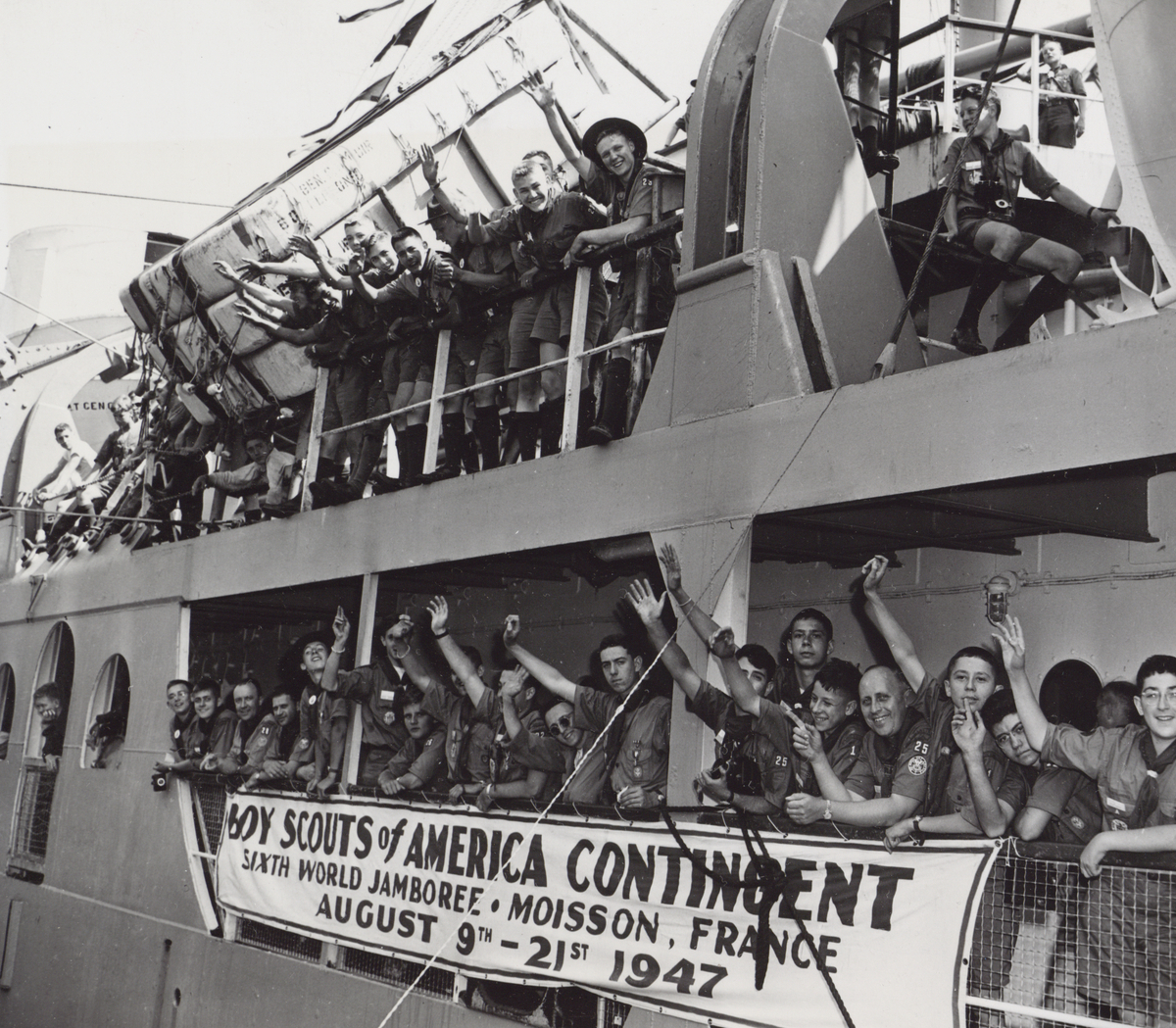
Boy scouts from the Boy Scouts of America contingent's farewell from New York City onboard the USS General C. H. Muir, on their way to the 6th World Scout Jamboree.

== High-ranked visitors ==
The President of the French Republic, Vincent Auriol, paid an official visit on 14 August 1947, and saw a special arena program, including massed Highland dancing by the Scots. He toured around the camp, partially on foot and partially on the unique little railway, brought from the Maginot Line, that circled around among the subcamps. His visit was also marked by clouds of dust-Moisson was the "Dustboree"-and by hordes of press photographers who seemed to make a point to get in his way, at which point General Joseph Lafont made the sotto voce plea "God Save the King"

== See also ==
- World Scout Jamboree
- Raymond Schlemmer
