= Muslim Scouts of France =

Muslim Scouting organization in France

Scouts Musulmans de France
- Muslim Scouts of France
- Headquarters: Noisy-le-Grand
- Country: France
- Founded: 1990
- Membership: 1,000

Scouts Musulmans de France (Muslim Scouts of France, SMF) is a French Muslim Scouting organization for boys and girls between 8 and 21 years old with about 1,000 members. It was founded in 1990 by Sheikh Khaled Bentounès, the spiritual leader of the Sufi Alawiya Brotherhood, and is headquartered in Noisy-le-Grand. It is part of the Fédération du Scoutisme Français (Federation of French Scouting) and through this a member of both the World Association of Girl Guides and Girl Scouts and the World Organization of the Scout Movement. It also is a member of the International Union of Muslim Scouts.

Younes Aberkane, the father of Idriss Aberkane, was one of the first leaders of the SMF. Younes Aberkane later became a director for Terre d’Europe, a similar organization.

== Emblem ==
The badge of the SMF consists of a red fleur de lis for allegiance to the Scout movement, resting on a green trefoil, a sign of belonging to the Guide movement, the 5 pointed star in the centre is for the Muslim belief of the association.

== Levels ==
There are four sections in the organisation:

- Voyageurs and Voyageuses are between 8 and 12 years old and belong to a Cercle.
- Éclaireurs and Éclaireuses are between 11 and 15 years old and belong to a Troupe.
- Pionniers and Pionnières are between 14 and 18 years old and belong to a Poste.
- Compagnons and Compagnonnes are between 17 and 21 years old and belong to a Relais.

== See also ==
- Scouting in France
