= Château de Jambville =

Castle in Île-de-France, France

Coordinates: 49.0453°N 1.8525°E

- Jambville in France
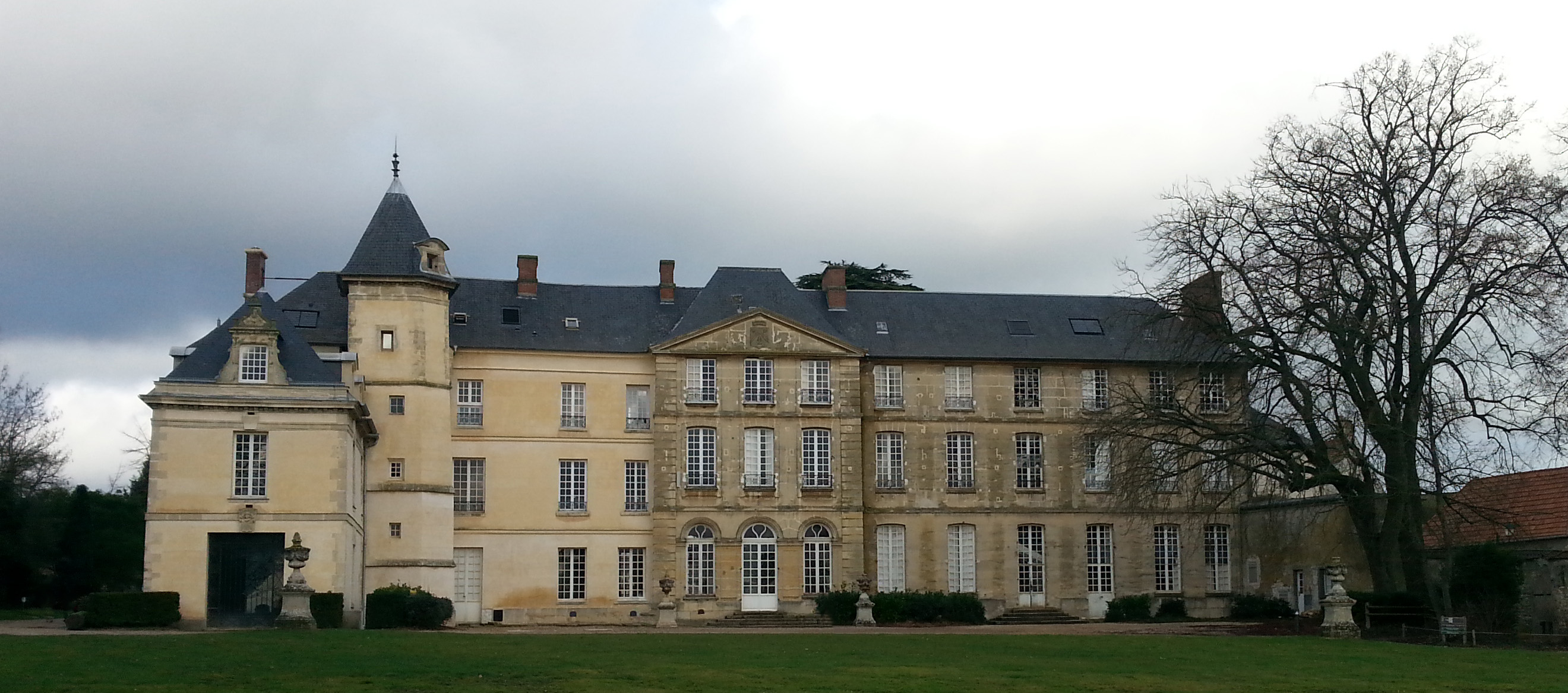

Site information
- Owner: Scouts et Guides de France

Location

Site history
- Built: 15th century

Château de Jambville is a French castle located in the town of Jambville in the Yvelines department, 50 km northwest of Paris. The castle was built between the 15th century and the 18th century on the foundations of a medieval castle. The lordship was granted to the steward Antoine Le Camus de Jambville in 1650. It passed in 1769 to the Marquis Charles-Claude-François du Tillet, colonel in the Royal Regiment, and to the stewardship of Étienne Thomas de Maussion in 1775. It was sold as national property in 1793. Baron Antoine Adolphe Thomas Maussion became the owner in 1816. in 1904, it was acquired by Paul Fould (1837–1917), master of requests to the Council of State. It has hosted the National Scout Training Centre of the Scouts et Guides de France since 1952.

== Gallery ==
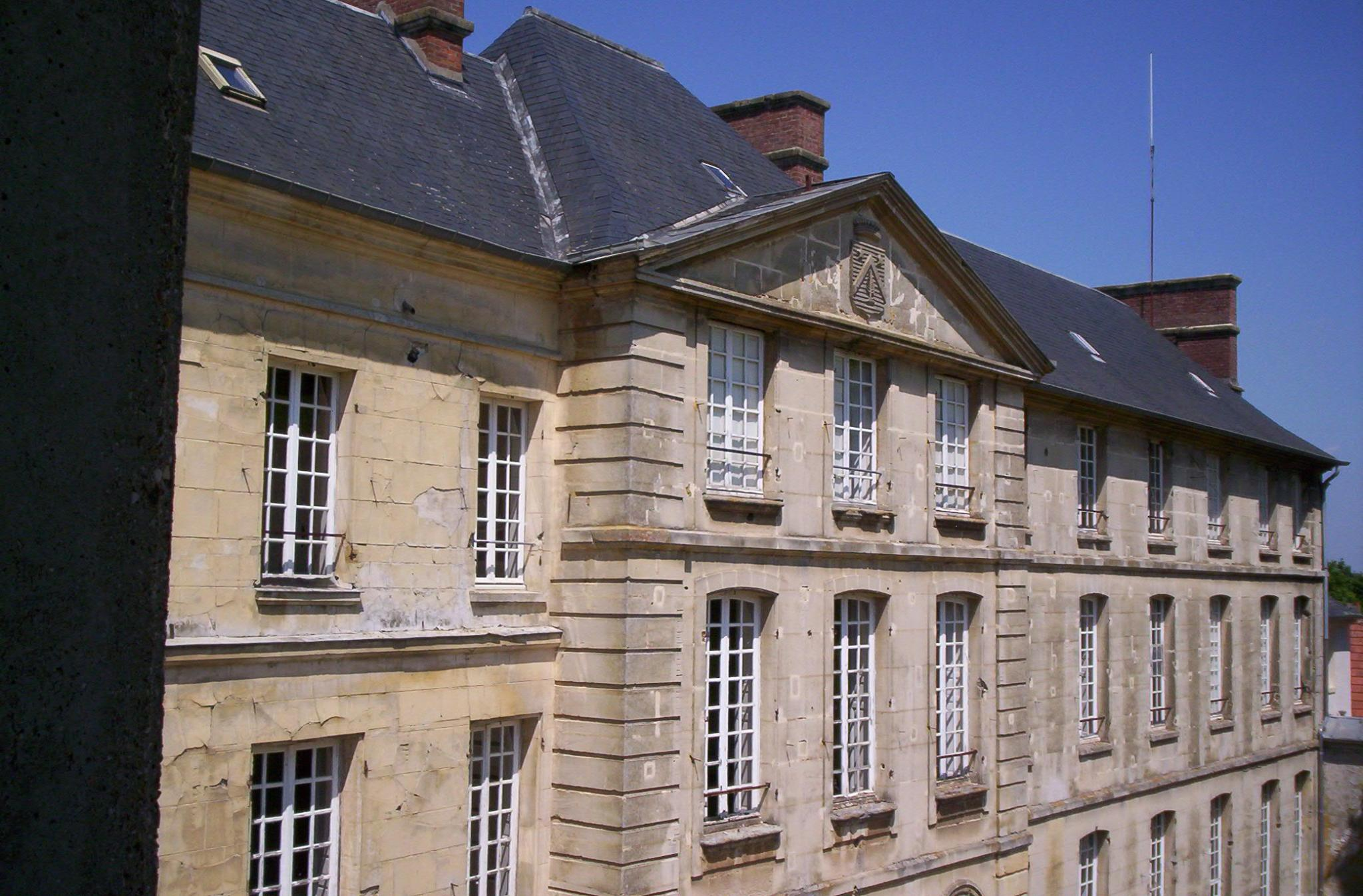

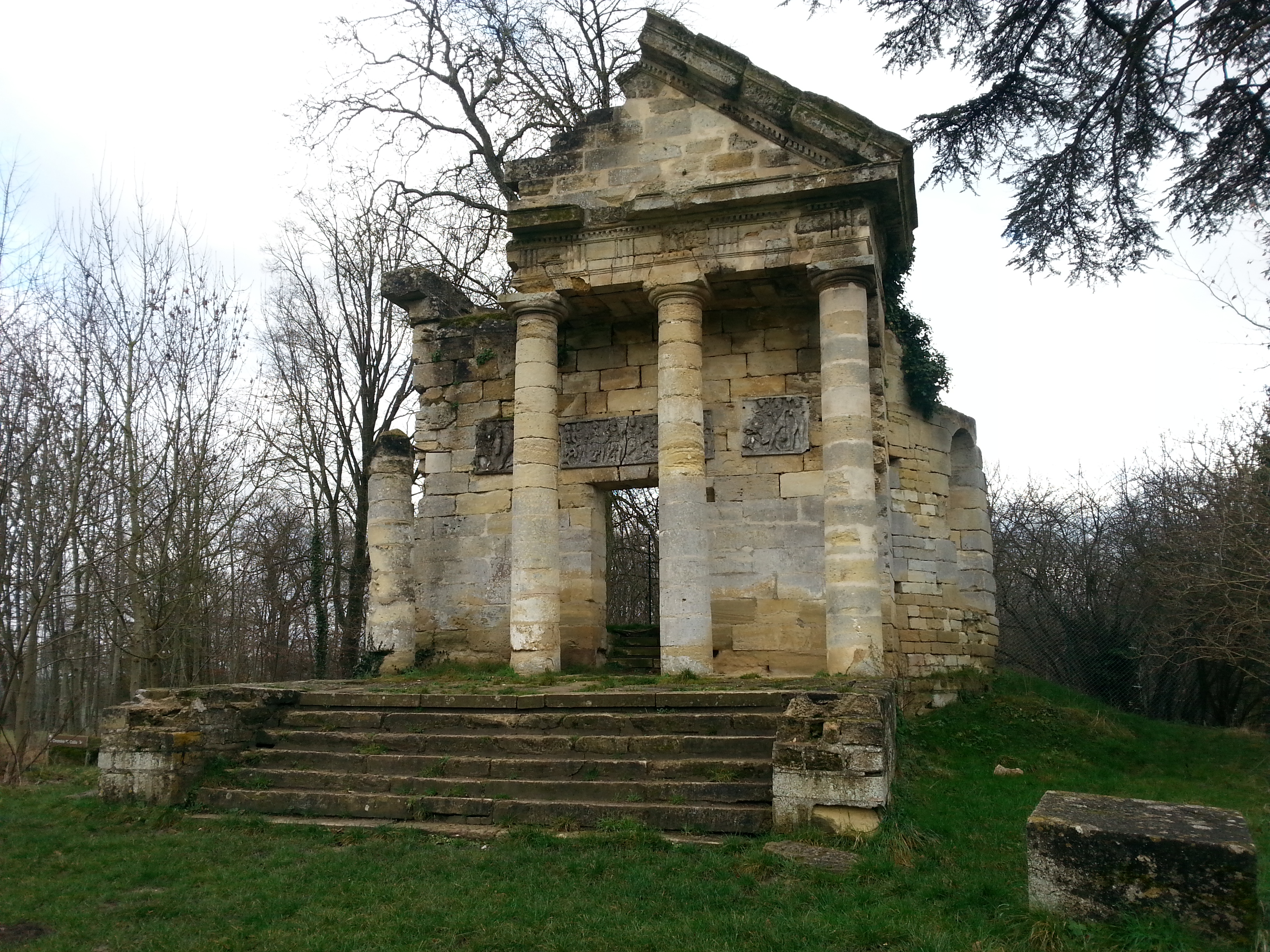
