= Fédération des Eclaireuses et Eclaireurs =

Fédération des éclaireuses et éclaireurs
- Guides and Scouts Federation
- Country: France
- Founded: 1989
- Membership: 2000
- Affiliation: Conférence Française de Scoutisme
- Website http://www.scout-fee.org/

The Fédération des éclaireuses et éclaireurs (FEE, Guides and Scouts Federation) is an umbrella federation of about 15 regional Scouting and Guiding associations in France. It was founded in 1989 and serves about 2000 members. The FEE is a member of the Conférence Française de Scoutisme.

== History ==
The FEE was founded by five local groups in 1989, all of them former members of the Eclaireuses et Eclaireurs de France (EEdF); the following year, they were joined by four formerly independent associations. In 1992, it received the public agreement which is necessary in France for all youth organizations. The FEE was among the founding members of the Conférence Française de Scoutisme in 2000.

== Component associations ==
The sources on the component associations differ and name between 12 and 19 member associations. Among the associations named are:

- Association de Scoutisme unioniste
- Association vairoise de Scoutisme laïque
- Eclaireurs du Midi
- Eclaireurs et Louvetaux orthodoxes
- Eclaireurs neutres du Limousin
- Eclaireuses et Eclaireurs alpins
- Eclaireuses et Eclaireurs Baden-Powell
- Eclaireuses et Eclaireurs Côte d'Opale
- Eclaireuses et Eclaireurs d'Armor
- Eclaireuses et Eclaireurs de Cognac
- Eclaireuses et Eclaireurs de Melun
- Eclaireuses et Eclaireurs de Vichy
- Eclaireuses et Eclaireurs de Seine-Saint-Denis
- Eclaireuses et Eclaireurs laïques
- Groupe Pierre Dejean
- Groupe Pierre François
- Scoutisme en Dombes
- Scoutisme unioniste Montalbanais
- Scoutisme unioniste Toulousain
- Scoutisme unitaire chrétien
- Scouts orthodoxes de France
- Scouts pluralistes de France

Former members

- Association française de Scoutisme unioniste; its components Scoutisme unioniste Montalbanais, Scoutisme unioniste Toulousain and Association de Scoutisme unioniste remained in the FEE as separate members after the disbandment of the AFSU.
- Eclaireuses et Eclaireurs Bois-Colombes (founding member of the FEE; returned to the EEdF in 2000)
- Eclaireuses et Eclaireurs de Gascogne
- Eclaireuses et Eclaireurs Sud Seine-et-Marne

== Program ==
The FEE as a whole is a non-denominational Scouting organization, but its component associations a free to choose a confessional sponsor. The associations works in three age-groups:

- Louvetaux/Louvettes (Cub Scouts) - ages 8 to 11
- Eclaireurs/Eclaireuse (Scouts/Guides) - ages 12 to 16
- Routiers/Aînées (Rover Scouts/Ranger Guides) - ages 17 and older
