= Idriss Aberkane =

French consultant (born 1986)

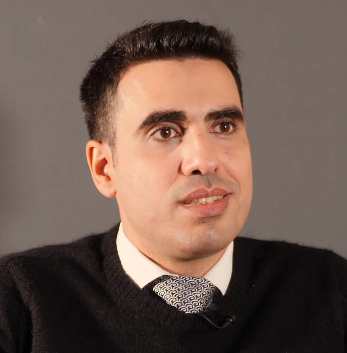
- Born: Idriss Jamil Aberkane; May 23, 1986 (age 40); Pithiviers, France
- Education: University of Strasbourg University Paris-Sud University Paris-Descartes
- Occupations: Public speaker, essayist, YouTuber
- Board member of: Muslim Scouts of France
- Website: http://idrissaberkane.org/

Idriss Jamil Aberkane (Arabic: إدريس جميل أبركان; born May 23, 1986) is a French public speaker and essayist. Known for his writings and lectures on personal development, he published a particularly popular essay in 2016, titled Free your brain! Treaty of neurowisdom to change school and society. However, he has been accused of artificially inflating his resume, plagiarizing portions of one of this theses, and of using his three doctoral diplomas (Ph.Ds) to talk about sciences that are not in his areas of expertise, including claiming to be a "doctor of neuroscience" and "researcher". The scientific accuracy of some of his statements and publications has been questioned by other researchers. His support for embattled French epidemiologist Didier Raoult, and his questioning of the reliability of COVID-19 vaccines, in particular Pfizer's, have caused him to be classified as an anti-vax conspiracist.

== Early life and education ==
Aberkane's parents taught mathematics at a teachers' college, and as a boy he participated in the Muslim Scouts of France, of which his father was one of the first leaders; he has cited his participation in the scouts as an inspiration for his life's work.

Aberkane has obtained three doctorate degrees: one in management science from Paris Saclay, one in Mediterranean and oriental sciences from University of Strasbourg, and one (not recognized by the French regulations for degrees) in international relations and diplomacy from Centre d'Études Diplomatiques et Stratégiques. University officials have since requested revocation of his management science PhD due to extensive plagiarism. His degree in diplomacy is not recognized by France. He became known in France for his lectures and essays about neurosciences, social psychology, gamification and their applications in education and business. A profile in the French newspaper Le Monde described his advocacy for these applications as "a bit North American, where science, popularization, morality, personal narrative and advice intertwine".

== Criticisms ==
Aberkane has been criticized for his lack of rigor and fabricating some parts of his resume. He has since published a copy of all his diplomas (including his three doctoral diplomas) on his personal website.

For social psychology and neurosciences researcher Sebastian Dieguez, Free up your Mind is "an uninterrupted succession of isolated facts, of pointless detours, anecdotes and personal opinions, elementary mistakes, debunked "theories", truisms, hyperboles and aphorisms, which do not make for good science education."

Aberkane claims to have solved the Collatz conjecture, but mathematicians who have studied his papers strongly disagree, pointing to major mistakes in the works and noting they were published in "predatory journals" by MDPI. Discussing Aberkane's works, Fabien Durand, a professor of mathematics at Université de Picardie Jules-Verne and the president of the French Mathematical Society, considers that he made several mistakes and that "most of the proofs are at the level of a high-school or first-year college student".

== Works ==
- Aberkane, Idriss Jamil (2015). Économie de la connaissance (in French). Fondapol, Fondation pour l'innovation politique. ISBN 9782364080829. OCLC 958458430.
- Aberkane, Idriss (2016). Libérez votre cerveau ! - traité de neurosagesse pour changer l'école et la société (in French). Robert Laffont Inc. ISBN 9782221187586. OCLC 968175754.
- Aberkane, Idriss (2016). "Chapter 2: Noopolitics: The Power of Knowledge". Innovation politique 2016 (in French). Fondapol, Fondation pour l'innovation politique. ISBN 9782130735335.
