= Pierre Joubert (illustrator) =

French illustrator and comics artist

- Born: 27 June 1910; Paris, France
- Died: 13 January 2002 (aged 91); La Rochelle, Charente-Maritime, France
- Occupations: Illustrator, comics artist

Pierre Joubert (June 27, 1910 – January 13, 2002) was a French illustrator and comics artist. He was closely associated with the creation of Scouting and the popular look of Boy Scouts in France and Belgium, comparable to the American artist Norman Rockwell.

== Biography ==
Pierre Joubert was born in Paris. Joubert was a young Scout himself, and attended the École des Arts Appliqués in Paris. His first amateur drawings appeared in Scouts de France in 1926. He graduated to the magazine L'Illustration in 1927 through 1934, but continued increasingly to focus on Scout-centered art in Scouting publications.

Joubert also was an illustrator of calendars, handbooks, boys' adventure novels, particularly the Signe de Piste (Trail Sign) line (where he worked with René Follet). The style of Joubert's illustrations depicted idealized boys experiencing the glories of Scouting and comradeship. Joubert is considered, owing to his eye for trend and his mass-market exposure, to have had reflective influence on boy-culture in France from the 1930s until the close of the 1960s. He made the comic book Gribouille, Scout (1935) and two books of the Pouf series. Not long before his death, Joubert produced a large volume of memoirs and reprinted art, Souvenirs en vrac. He died in La Rochelle at age 91.

== Bibliography ==
- The Jungle Book by Rudyard Kipling
- Treasure Island by Robert Louis Stevenson
