= Association des Guides et Scouts d'Europe =

- Association of the Guides and Scouts of Europe
- Headquarters: B.P. 17; F-77570 Château-Landon
- Country: France
- Founded: 1958
- Founder: Jean-Claude Alain
- Membership: 33,000
- President: Erik Paris
- Vice-president: Edouard Colin; Cyril de Queral; Myriam Cocquet
- Affiliation: Union Internationale des Guides et Scouts d'Europe, Conférence Française de Scoutisme
- Website http://www.scouts-europe.org/

The Association des Guides et Scouts d'Europe (AGSE, Association of the Guides and Scouts of Europe) is a Roman Catholic Scouting and Guiding organization in France. It was founded in 1958 and serves about 26,600 members. The organization was a founding member of the Union Internationale des Guides et Scouts d'Europe and the Conférence Française de Scoutisme.

== Program ==
The association is divided in three sections according to age:

- Louvettes et Louveteaux (Cub Scouts) – ages 8 to 12
- Eclaireuses et les Eclaireurs (Guides and Scouts) – ages 12 to 17
- Guides Aînées et Routiers (Rangers and Rovers) – ages 17 and older

All local units are single sex, despite the association as whole being mixed. The AGSE runs about 25 Sea Scout units and around 20 Lake Scout units.

== Ideals ==
=== Principles ===
1. Le devoir du scout (de la guide) commence à la maison.
  The duty of the Scout (the Guide) begins at home.
2. Fidèle à sa patrie, le scout (la guide) est pour l'Europe unie et fraternelle.
  Loyal to his native country, the Scout (the Guide) supports a united and fraternal Europe.
3. Fils (Fille) de la Chrétienté, le scout (la guide) est fier (fière) de sa foi : il (elle) travaille à établir le règne du Christ dans toute sa vie et dans le monde qui l'entoure.
  As a son (daughter) of Christendom, the Scout (the Guide) is proud of his faith: he strives to establish Christ's reign in every aspect of his life and in the world surrounding him .

=== Law ===
1. Le scout (La guide) met son honneur à mériter confiance.
  The Scout (The Guide) puts his honour in deserving confidence.
2. Le scout (La guide) est loyal(e) à son pays, ses parents, ses chefs et ses subordonnés.
  The Scout (The Guide) is loyal to his country, his parents, his superiors and his subordinates.
3. Le scout (La guide) est fait pour servir et sauver son prochain.
  The Scout (The Guide) is ready to serve and save his neighbour.
4. Le scout est l'ami de tous et le frère de tout autre scout. (La guide est bonne pour tous et la sœur de toute autre guide).
  The Scout is a friend to everybody and a brother to every other Scout. (The Guide is good to everybody and a sister to every other Guide.)
5. Le scout (La guide) est courtois(e) et chevaleresque (généreuse).
  The Scout (The Guide) is courteous and gallant (generous).
6. Le scout (La guide) voit dans la nature l'œuvre de Dieu : il (elle) aime les plantes et les animaux.
  The Scout (The Guide) sees the work of God in nature: he loves plants and animals.
7. Le scout (La guide) obéit sans réplique et ne fait rien à moitié.
  The Scout (The Guide) obeys without protest and finishes his tasks.
8. Le scout (La guide) est maître(sse) de soi : il (elle) sourit et chante dans les difficultés.
  The Scout (The Guide) is master of himself: he smiles and sings in all difficulties.
9. Le scout (La guide) est économe et prend soin du bien d'autrui.
  The Scout (The Guide) is thrifty and cares for the property of others.
10. Le scout (La guide) est pur(e) dans ses pensées, ses paroles et ses actes.
  The Scout (The Guide) is pure in his thoughts, words and deeds.

=== Promise ===
"Sur mon honneur, avec la grâce de Dieu, je m'engage

à servir de mon mieux Dieu, l'Église, ma patrie et l'Europe,

à aider mon prochain en toutes circonstances,

à observer la loi scoute (guide).

On my honor and with the grace of God, I promise

to serve God, the Church, my fatherland and Europe,

to aid my neighbour in all circumstances,

and to observe the Scout (Guide) Law."
