= Scouting and Guiding in Mayotte =

Scouting and Guiding associations in Mayotte

Scouting and Guiding Organizations Serving Mayotte

- Scouts de la collectivité départemental française de Mayotte (until 2004: Scouts français de la collectivité départemental de Mayotte), which is affiliated to the Fédération du scoutisme français
- Scouts à Mayotte
