= International Day of Living Together in Peace =

The International Day of Living Together in Peace is observed annually in May 16. It was established by the United Nations General Assembly in 2017 (Resolution A\RES\72\130) as a means of regularly mobilizing the efforts of the international community to promote peace, tolerance, inclusion, understanding and solidarity.

== Purpose ==
The day serves as a platform to:

- Promote peaceful and inclusive societies
- Encourage tolerance and respect among individuals regardless of race, religion, or background
- Support efforts to foster dialogue, mutual understanding and cooperation

== Observance ==
Various countries, organizations, and communities mark the day with educational programs, intercultural events, community dialogues, and initiatives aimed at conflict resolution and social cohesion.
