= Joseph Lafont =

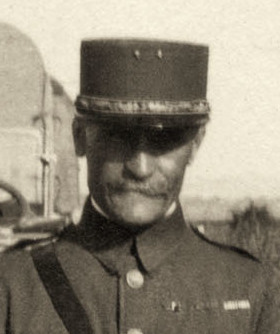
Brigadier General Lafont in 1926.

General Michel Laurent Marie Joseph Lafont (1874–1961) was the third Chief Scout of Scouts de France from 1936 to 1948, the first and only Chief Scout of Scoutisme Français from 1940 to 1948, and member of the International Committee of the World Organization of the Scout Movement (WOSM). He is buried in Saint-Étienne Cemetery in Bayonne.

== Background ==
LaFont was a French General who in his retirement devoted his work to Scouting.

== Bibliography ==
- Christophe Carichon (2021). Grandes figures du scoutisme (in French). Artège. pp. 145–155. ISBN 9791033611806.
