= Christian Larcher =

French scouting leader (born 1953)

Christian Larcher (born 15 September 1953, in Charmois-l'Orgueilleux, Lorraine, France) is a French scouting leader, who served as the International Commissioner of the Scouts et Guides de France for many years. He also assumed the interim post of Delegate General following the departure of Catherine Larrieu in 2016.

In 2015, Larcher was awarded the 345th Bronze Wolf, the only distinction of the World Organization of the Scout Movement, awarded by the World Scout Committee for exceptional services to world Scouting.

Larcher is married and lives in Lagny, Île-de-France, France.
