= Scouts unitaires de France =

Scouts Unitaires de France
- Unitary Scouts of France
- Headquarters: Paris
- Country: France
- Founded: 1971
- Membership: 30,000
- President: Thierry Berlizot
- Website https://www.scouts-unitaires.org

The Scouts Unitaires de France (Unitary Scouts of France, SUF) is a French Catholic Scouting movement created in 1971. It is the third largest Scout movement in France.

From 1964 to 1970 the Scouts de France prepared and experimented with a new pedagogy, splitting the Scout troops (unités) into two new sections and partly implementing coeducation. Until 1971 the old and the new pedagogies coexisted. In the 1970s the new pedagogy became compulsory. In 1971 around twenty local groups refused to conform and chose to stay with the former unitary pedagogy. These groups created the Scouts Unitaires de France, initially with around 1,000 members. In 1980 the SUF had 10,000 members and by 2022 had grown further to 30,000 members.

== History ==
The Association was approved by the Ministry of Youth and Sports in 1974. The movement reached 10,000 members in 1980 and was recognized as a public utility three years later, growing throughout the 1980s. The Ministry of the Environment approved the SUF in 1986.

In 1998, the movement experienced a crisis of confidence among the general public. As a response, the staff was cut following the drama of Perros-Guirec, in which four sailing scouts, members of a small group not recognized by the State or a federation drowned. This episode led to tighter control by the State and the adoption of several quality charters by different scout movements. After four trials, the head of the scout camp was condemned and the Scout Association dissolved. A year later, the movement signed the Message to Families with the Conférence Française de Scoutisme.

For the occasion of the Jubilee of the year 2000, SUF drew 12,000 young people together for national days at Lyon in the park of Lacroix-Laval. Celebrations of the Centenary of Scouting were organized globally by Scouts in 2007, as part of SUF tradition, participate in many international gatherings. At Pentecost, 17,300 SUF met each other in the woods of Chambord for national days in a camp of over 2,500 tens.

In 2022, the mouvement celebrated its 50th anniversary by organizing the gathering of its 30 000 members in the park of the castle of Chambord. The event had been planned to take place in 2021, the real 50th anniversary, but due to the Covid-19 pandemic, it had to be delayed to the next year.

As of 2003, SUF had 18,000 members, rising to 23,000 in 2008 and 30,000 in 2021.

== See also ==
- Scouting in France
