= Michel Rigal =

General Commissioner of the Scouts de France
- In office 1952–1970
- Preceded by: Georges Gaultier
- Succeeded by: Emile-Xavier Visseaux

Michel Rigal (Paris April 6, 1914 – August 11, 1978 in Conflans-Sainte-Honorine, France) was General Commissioner of the Scouts de France from 1952 to 1970, a period of crises and reforms during which he endeavored to maintain the unity of the movement.

In opposition to Rigal, Pierre Delsuc resigned from the National Council of the Scouts de France in 1958. Their opposition became public in June 1960 when Delsuc denounced Rigal's position in a letter published by France catholique, a moderate Catholic weekly, over the Algerian War.

Non-profit organization positions
Preceded by Georges Gaultier	Secretary General; 1953–1970	Succeeded by Emile-Xavier Visseaux
