= Jambville =

- Commune
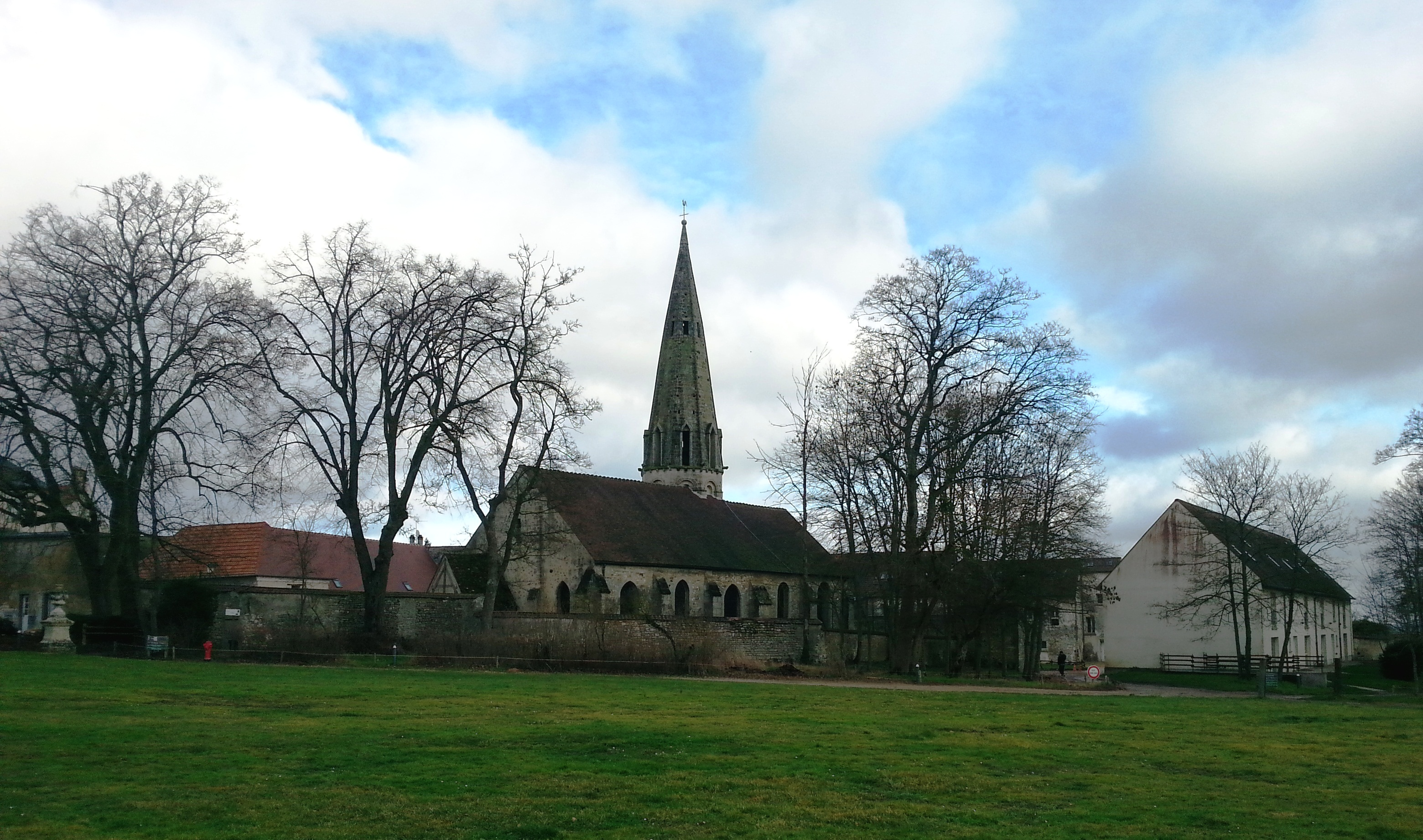
- A view of the church from the Chateau park, in Jambville
- Location of Jambville
- Location within France Location within Île-de-France (region)
- Coordinates: 49°02′49″N 1°51′14″E
- Country: France
- Region: Île-de-France
- Department: Yvelines
- Arrondissement: Mantes-la-Jolie
- Canton: Limay
- Intercommunality: CU Grand Paris Seine et Oise

Government
  - Mayor (2020–2026): Jean-Marie Ripart
- Area^{1}: 4.81 km^{2} (1.86 sq mi)
- Elevation: 182 m (597 ft)
- Highest elevation: 188 m (617 ft)
- Lowest elevation: 43 m (141 ft)
- Population (2023): 793
  - Density: 165/km^{2} (427/sq mi)
- Time zone: UTC+01:00 (CET)
  - Summer (DST): UTC+02:00 (CEST)
- INSEE/Postal code: 78317 /78440
- ^{1} French Land Register data, which excludes lakes, ponds, glaciers > 1 km^{2} (0.386 sq mi or 247 acres) and river estuaries.

Jambville (French pronunciation: [ʒɑ̃bvil]) is a commune in the Yvelines department in the Île-de-France region in north-central France. It is 50 kilometres to the north west of Paris in the heart of the Vexin national park. Château de Jambville is the Centre national de formation des Scouts et Guides de France (National Training Centre for Scouts and Guides of France). The chateau dates from the 16th to the 19th Century.

== See also ==
- Communes of the Yvelines department
