= Éclaireurs de la Nature =

Buddhist Scout movement

- Headquarters: Paris
- Country: France
- Founded: 2007
- Membership: 1 000
- Affiliation: World Association of Girl Guides and Girl Scouts, World Organization of the Scout Movement
- Website http://www.edln.org/

The Éclaireurs de la Nature (Association of Scouts of Nature, EDLN) is a Buddhist Scout movement, founded in 2007. The association has about 1 000 members divided into eight groups, as of 2018. EDLN is a member of the World Buddhist Scout Brotherhood (WBSB) is a federation partner of World Organization of the Scout Movement and full member of Scoutisme Français, as of 2017. EDLN is a member of the Buddhist Union of France.

== See also ==
- Scouting in France
