= Eclaireuses et Eclaireurs Unionistes de France =

French Scouting organization affiliated with the Protestant church

Éclaireuses et éclaireurs unionistes de France
- approximate translation: Unionist Guides and Scouts of France
- Headquarters: Secrétariat National
- Location: 15 rue Klock; 92110 Clichy
- Country: France
- Founded: January 18, 1970
- Founders: Éclaireurs unionistes de France, Fédération française des eclaireuses unionistes
- Membership: 6,023
- President: Elsa Bouneau
- Affiliation: Fédération du Scoutisme Français, Protestant Federation of France
- Website http://www.eeudf.org/

The Éclaireuses et éclaireurs unionistes de France (EEUdF, approximate translation Unionist Guides and Scouts of France) are a Protestant Scouting and Guiding organization in France. The association serves 6,023 members and is affiliated to the Fédération du Scoutisme Français; it is also a member of the Protestant Federation of France.

== History ==
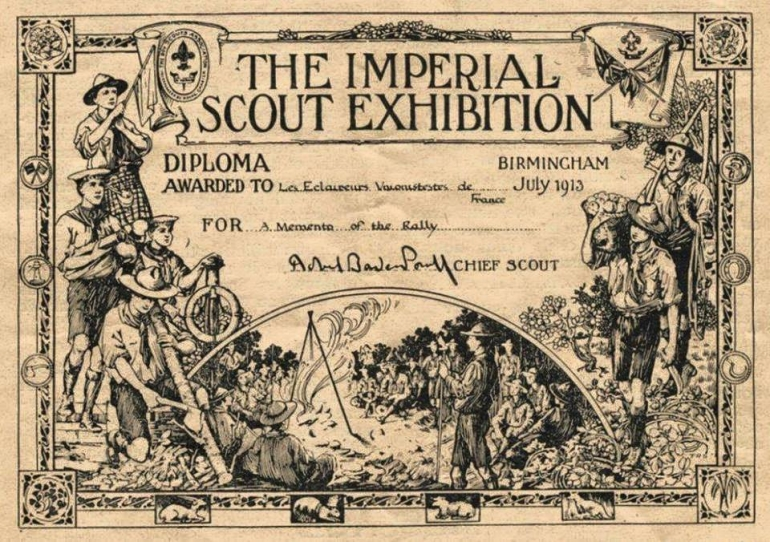
Certificate awarded to Les Éclaireurs (misspelled as "Unionistestes") as "A Memento of the Rally" and signed by Robert Baden-Powell at the Imperial Scout Exhibition, Birmingham, in July 1913.

The adjective "unioniste" in the association's name refers to the Unions chrétiennes de jeunes gens, the French YMCA, and the Unions Chrétiennes des Jeunes Filles, the YWCA, where the first Protestant Scout and Guide units were started in the years 1910 to 1912.

The Protestant Scout association Eclaireurs unionistes de France was founded in 1912; the Guides joined the Fédération Française des Eclaireuses (French Guides Federation) on its foundation in 1921. Both organizations were among the founders of the Fédération du Scoutisme Français (Federation of French Scouting) in 1941.

The Fédération française des eclaireuses, which rejoined non-denominational, Jewish and Protestant units, became the Fédération française des eclaireuses unionistes in 1964, when the non-denominational groups merged with the Eclaireurs de France and the Jewish with the Eclaireurs israélites de France.

In 1970, the Eclaireurs unionistes de France and the Fédération française des éclaireuses unionistes merged, forming the Fédération des éclaireuses et éclaireurs unionistes de France (FEEUF). This federation was renamed to Éclaireuses et éclaireurs unionistes de France in 1995.

Since 2008, the EEUdF cooperates with the other Protestant Scouting organizations within the Protestant Federation of France: Fédération du Scoutisme evangélique français(with Éclaireurs Evangéliques de France, Les Porteurs de Flambeau (Salvation Army), Flambeaux et Claires Flammes, and Royal Rangers) and Jeunesse Adventiste (Pathfinders).

== Emblem ==
Emblem of Eclaireuses et Eclaireurs Unionistes de France 1995-2010

The emblem mirrors the evolution of the association. It is the old EUdF emblem enriched with a trefoil in the center to symbolize the merger with part of the PFF (girls) in 1970, lily flowers symbolizing the presence of boys. Until 1995, the logo included the word "federation" (again because of the merger with the FFE).

== Program ==
The association is divided in three age-groups called "branches"; local units should work in all three branches:

- Branche cadette: Louvetaux and Louvettes (Cub Scouts) - ages 8 to 12
- Branche moyenne: Eclaireurs and Eclaireuses (Boy Scouts/Girl Guides) - ages 12 to 16
- Branche aînée: Aînés and Aînées (Rover Scouts/Ranger Guides) - ages 16 to 19

The EEUdF runs an active Sea Scout section.

== Ideals ==
=== Promise ===
Cub Scouts
With the help of all of the Pack, I promise to do my best to:

- respect the Law and the Charter of the Pack
- know Jesus
- help others
- and ...

Scouts and Guides
I promise to do all that I can to:

- heed to the word of God
- put myself in the service of others
- live the law of the scout
- and ...

Rovers Scouts and Ranger Guides
I promise to do all that I can to:

- live the ideals of the Law
- give meaning to my life
- engage in the service of others
- heed to the word of God
- and ...

=== Law ===
Cub Scouts
Each Cub in good spirits, does their best, respects others, and lives the Adventure of the Pack.
Scouts and Guides
Each Scout:

- keeps their word and puts in honest work, we can trust them,
- thinks before acting, is responsible for their actions,
- is a team player, learns to listen and share,
- hones their skills and renders themself in the service of others,
- respects, understands, and protects nature,
- takes care of their body and health,
- stays in good spirits and controls oneself, even when faced with difficulties.

Rovers Scouts and Ranger Guides
Each Elder

- respects and understands their bodies, and knows their limits,
- develops skills for being independent,
- makes necessary choices and follows through with their promises,
- stays deliberate during adversity
- is supportive and attentive to others
- is an example of open-mindedness,
- witnesses their own spiritual journey
- is aware of and takes responsibility for the consequences of their actions,
- looks after their surroundings and protects its careful balance.

=== Motto ===
Cub Scouts
Our best.
Scouts and Guides
Be prepared!
Rovers Scouts and Ranger Guides
On the way!
