= Vogelenzang =

- Village
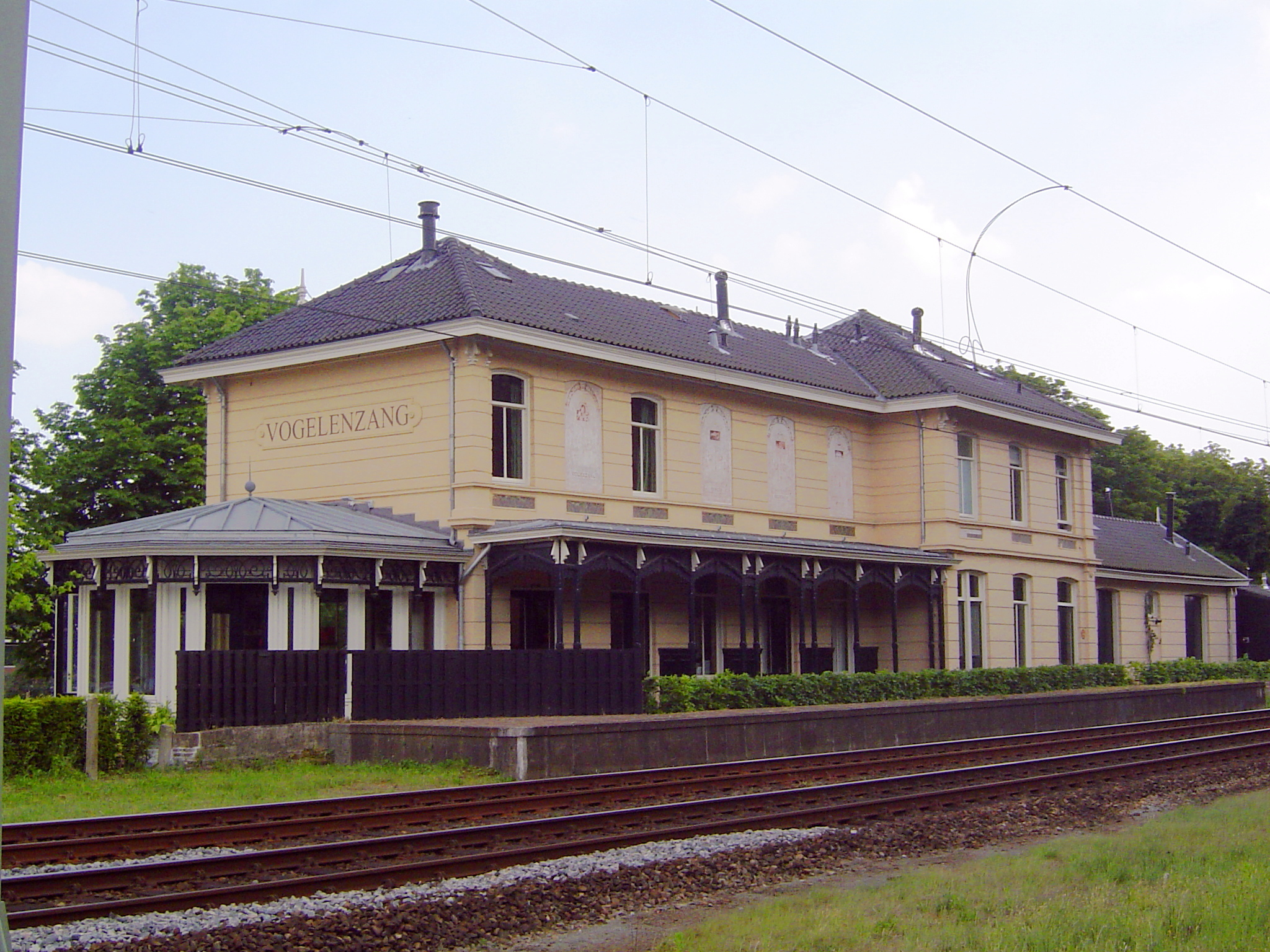
- Former station Vogelenzang

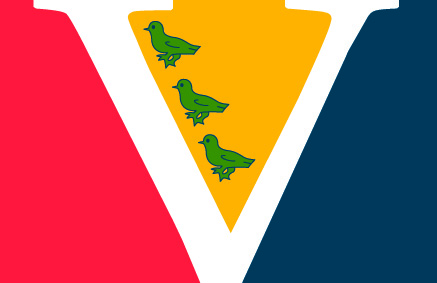
- Flag

- Location in the Netherlands Location in the province of North Holland in the Netherlands
- Coordinates: 52°19′8″N 4°34′36″E
- Country: Netherlands
- Province: North Holland
- Municipality: Bloemendaal

Area
  - Total: 7.97 km^{2} (3.08 sq mi)
- Elevation: 2.1 m (6.9 ft)

Population (2021)
  - Total: 2,235
  - Density: 280/km^{2} (726/sq mi)
- Time zone: UTC+1 (CET)
  - Summer (DST): UTC+2 (CEST)
- Postal code: 2114
- Dialing code: 023

Vogelenzang is a village in the municipality of Bloemendaal, North Holland, Netherlands. The name "Vogelenzang" is Dutch for "bird song".

== Attractions ==
The Huis te Vogelenzang (House at Vogelenzang) was built circa 1600 by the Counts of Holland and was rebuilt in a neoclassical style 200 years later. Today the privately owned estate has 80 hectares of park grounds consisting of old coastal dunes and plains with historic pastures.

Since 1853 Amsterdam obtains its fresh potable water from the so-called Amsterdamse Waterleidingduinen (Water Supply Dunes) near Vogelenzang (but mostly within Zandvoort municipality). It uses 34 square kilometres (13 sq mi) of sand dunes to filter water and is the oldest location used as such in the Netherlands.

Vogelenzang used to have a railway station called Vogelenzang-Bennebroek along the Haarlem - Leiden Centraal line. The station opened in 1842, but closed in 1944. This wooden building still exists but is no longer in use as a station.

== Trivia ==
Vogelenzang was the site of the 5th World Scout Jamboree, held in 1937, which brought together 28,750 Scouts and Guides from all over the world.

== Gallery ==
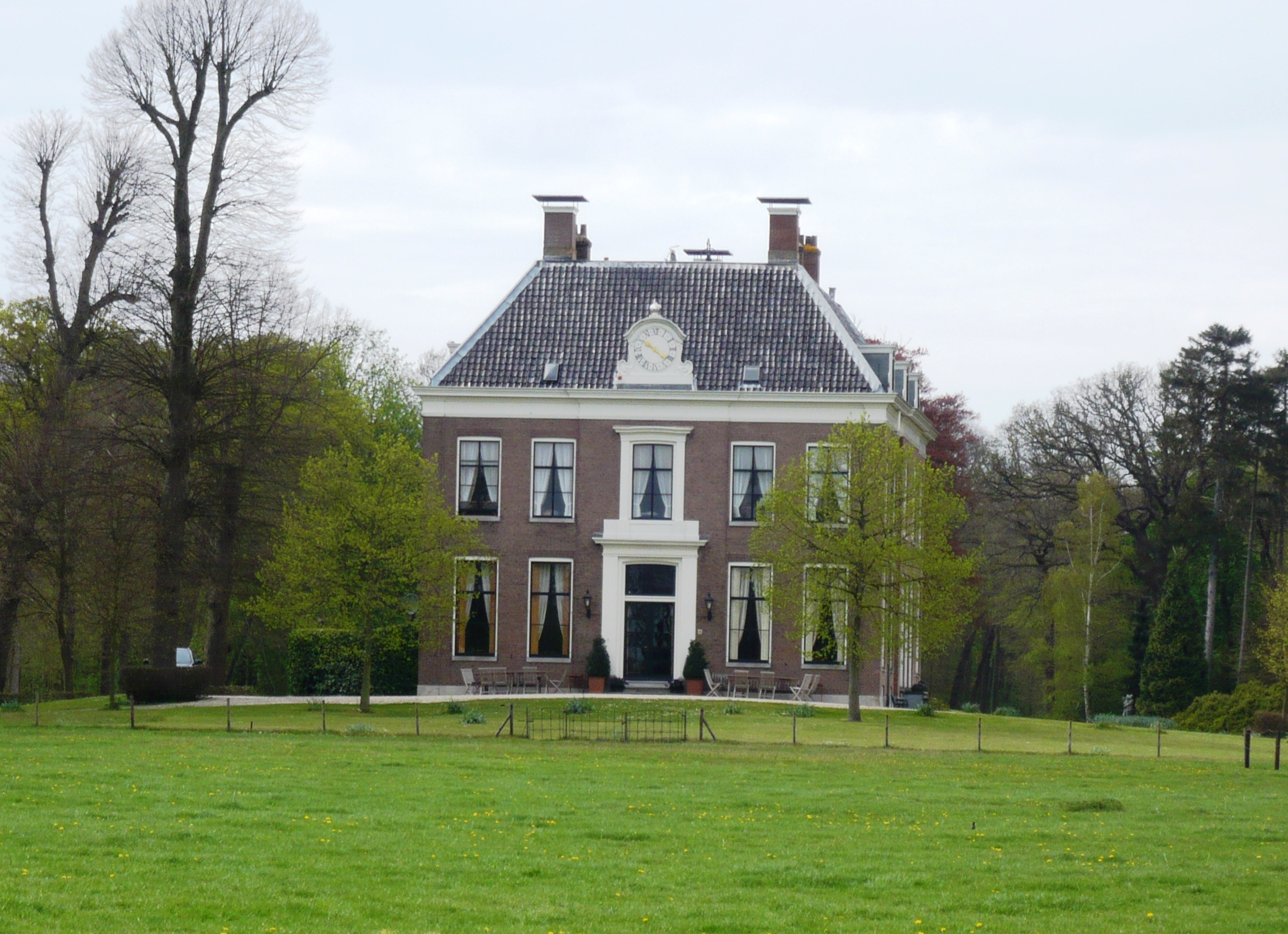
Huis te Vogelenzang

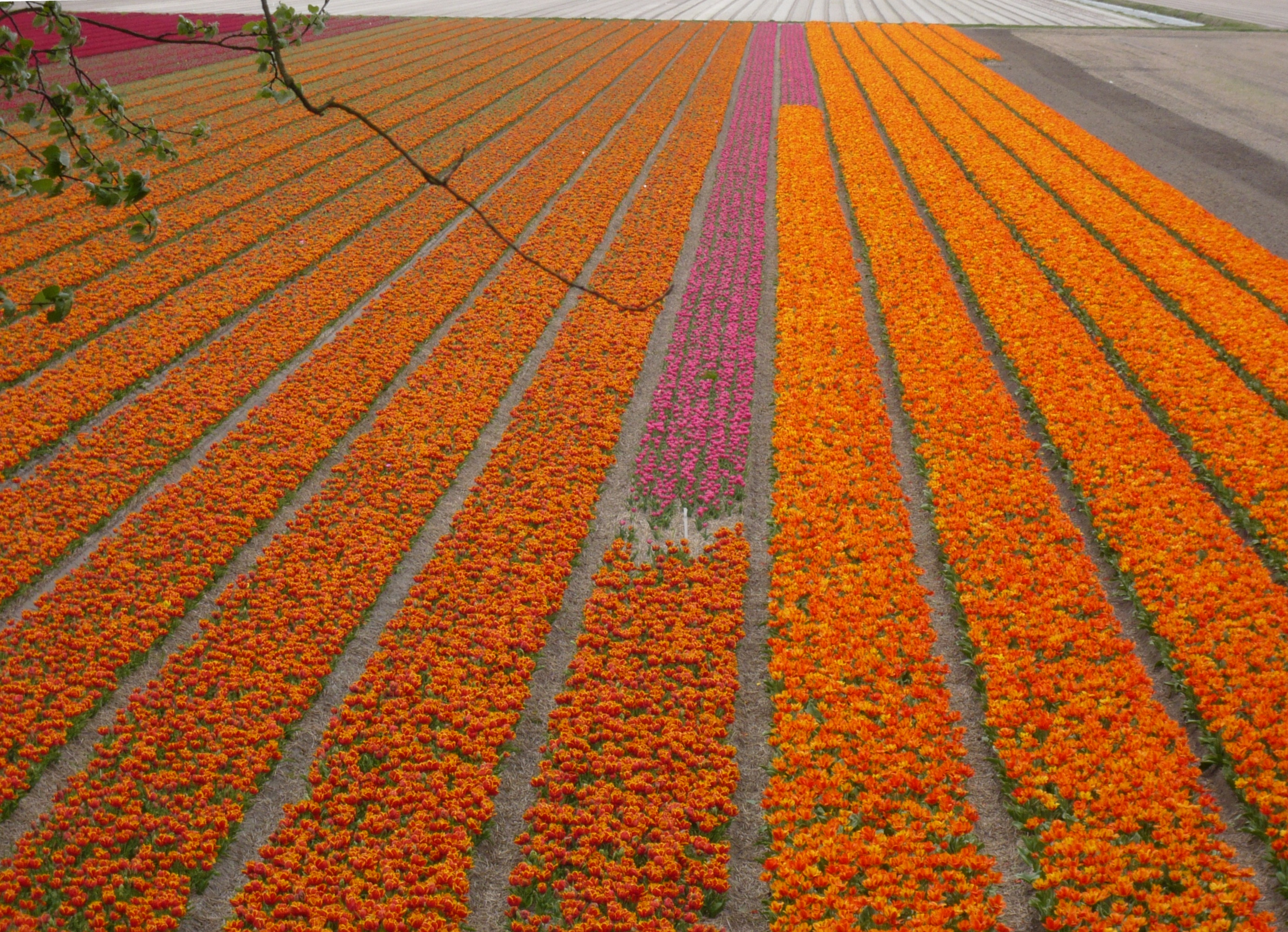
Spring tulips near the Tweede Doodweg, Vogelenzang (photo taken from the Amsterdamse Waterleidingduinen park).

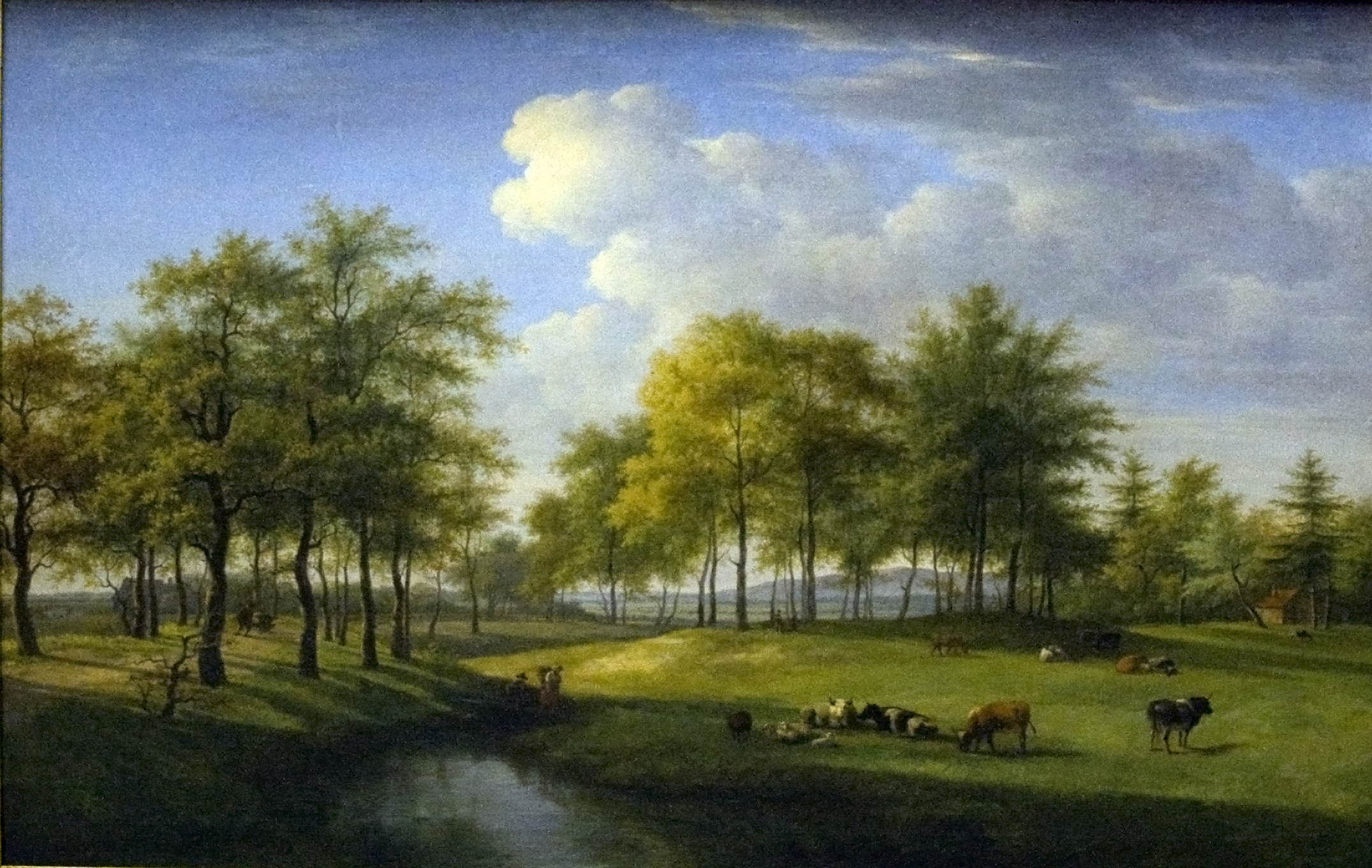
Painting of the Landscape (1824)

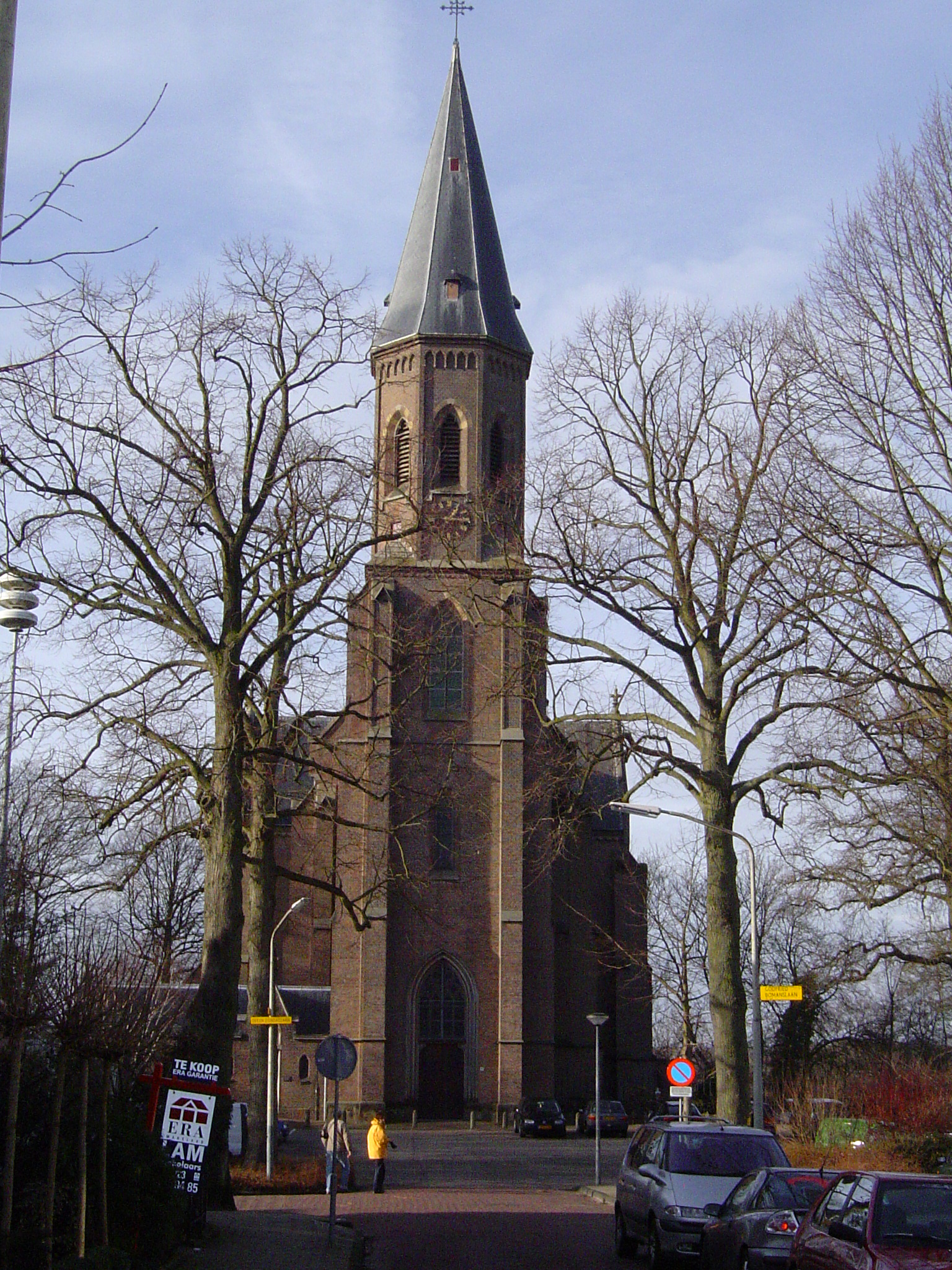
Catholic church
