= Scoutisme Français =

French Scouting umbrella organization

Fédération du Scoutisme Français
- Federation of French Scouting

- Headquarters: Paris
- Country: France
- Founded: 1940
- Membership: 134,000
- President: Yannick Daniel
- Treasurer: Lacina Touré
- Secretary: Karen Allali
- Affiliation: World Association of Girl Guides and Girl Scouts, World Organization of the Scout Movement
- Website scoutisme-francais.fr

The Fédération du Scoutisme Français (Federation of French Scouting) is an umbrella organization that combines the efforts of the several Scouting and Guiding associations in France and also represents the Scouting movement in French Guiana, Martinique, Saint-Pierre and Miquelon, New Caledonia, Réunion, Wallis and Futuna and Guadeloupe. Until 2012 the Muslim Scouts of France were presiding the Federation with Dr. Younès F. Aberkane as president.

The federation serves about 134,000 members (as of 2008) and is a member of both the World Association of Girl Guides and Girl Scouts and the World Organization of the Scout Movement.

== Member organizations ==
- Éclaireuses et Éclaireurs de France (EEdF) – for persons of any religion, oldest Scouting organization in the country, formed in 1911
- Éclaireuses et Éclaireurs israélites de France (EEIdF) – for Jewish Scouts, formed in 1923
- Éclaireuses et Éclaireurs unionistes de France (EEUdF) – for Protestant Scouts, formed in 1911
- Scouts et Guides de France (SGdF) – formed on September 1, 2004 from the merger of two Roman Catholic Scouting organizations: the Guides de France (founded in 1923) and the Scouts de France (founded in 1920)
- Scouts Musulmans de France (SMdF) – for Muslim Scouts, formed in 1990
- Éclaireurs de la Nature (EDLN) – for Buddhist Scouts; full member 2017
- Scouts Vietnamiens de France (ASVD) – for youth of Vietnamese descent; associate member

Non-sovereign territories with Scouting run by Scoutisme Français include

- French Guiana – Scouting in French Guiana
- Guadeloupe and Saint Martin – Scouting in Guadeloupe et Saint Martin
- Martinique – Scouts et Guides de Martinique
- Mayotte – Scouting in Mayotte
- New Caledonia – Scouting in New Caledonia
- Réunion – Scouting on Réunion
- Saint Pierre and Miquelon
- Wallis and Futuna – Scouting in Wallis and Futuna

== See also ==
- Pierre Joubert
- Scouting in France
