= International Union of Guides and Scouts of Europe =

Traditional faith-based Scouting organization

International Union of the Guides and Scouts of Europe
- Headquarters: Château-Landon, Seine-et-Marne, France
- Country: see table
- Founded: 1956
- Membership: 77,000
- Federal Commissioner: Nathalie Flama
- Federal Chairman: Jean-Luc Angélis
- Website uigse-fse.org

The International Union of the Guides and Scouts of Europe – Federation of Scouts of Europe (Union Internationale des Guides et Scouts d’Europe, UIGSE; also known as Union Internationale des Guides et Scouts d'Europe – Fédération du Scoutisme Européen, UISGE-FSE, or simply as Fédération du Scoutisme Européen, FSE) is a traditional faith-based Scouting organization with 73 member associations in 17 European countries and also in the Americas, serving roughly 73,000 members. The organization, headquartered in France, was founded in 1956 by a group of German and French Roman Catholic Scoutmasters as a faith-based Scouting movement, in order to reconcile the European peoples in the aftermath of the Second World War.

== History ==
The Catholic Scouting tradition was started by Father Jacques Sevin, Count Mario di Carpegna, professor Jean Corbisier and others. The Federation of Scouts of Europe (FSE) was founded in Europe in 1956 as a European Catholic Scouting organization in Cologne, Germany. From 1962 to 1968 under the direction of Perig and Lizig Géraud-Keraod, the FSE revised the association's constitution, drafted the Charter of the Natural and Christian Principles of European Scouting and drafted a new federal statute. The statute adopted its current name and acknowledged its "belonging to the Catholic Church". In 2003, the Holy See's Pontifical Council for the Laity granted the organization five year recognition status as a Private International Association of Faithful of Pontifical Right, and, in 2008, it granted the organization a Decree of recognition.

In 1978, the Confederation of European Scouts (CES) split from the UIGSE. It left after controversies about the importance of religious elements in the national associations' programs and co-education.

== Governance ==
The UIGSE governing organization include a federal council, a federal bureau and a federal commission. The federal council is made up of member associations representatives and meets yearly to make changes in the programs and the guidelines, determining addition or expulsion of member associations, adopt the organization budget and appointment of federal bureau members and other committees or working groups.

The federal bureau consists of the president, the vice president, and the secretary of the federal council plus the federal commissioner. Consultative voting members of the bureau are the spiritual advisor (ecclesiastical assistant) and the deputy commissioners. General management is handled by the bureau.

The commission is the day-to-day management of the organization headed by the federal commissioner. The organization publishes Nouvelles de notre Fraternité, a quarterly newsletter and Lettre aux Commissaires généraux, a quarterly liaison newsletter.

== Member organizations ==
Member organizations are required to be Roman Catholic, but may accept Scouts and Guides from different Christian backgrounds. Associations of other churches or ecclesial communities may be accepted by the UIGSE-FSE council as associate members.

== See also ==
- Bleimor (Scouting)
