= Éclaireuses et Éclaireurs de France =

Scout and guide association in France

- Guides and Scouts of France
- Headquarters: Noisy-le-Grand
- Country: France
- Founded: 1964
- Membership: 17,000
- President: Yannick Daniel
- Website http://www.eedf.fr

Éclaireuses et Éclaireurs de France (Guides and Scouts of France, EEdF) is an interreligious and coeducational Scouting and Guiding association in France. The first interreligious Scouting groups in France were founded in 1911, and interreligious Guiding started in 1914; both movements merged in 1964 forming the EEdF. The association serves today about 17,000 members of both sexes.

EEdF is a member of Scoutisme Français and through this federation also a member of both the World Organization of the Scout Movement and the World Association of Girl Guides and Girl Scouts.

== Emblem ==
Emblem of the Eclaireurs de France from 1911 until 1940

The bow and arrow were chosen as emblems by the founders of the Eclaireurs de France in 1911. The trefoil is for the girls and women. The four colours (orange, green, red, blue) represent the four age groups.

== History ==
Emblem of the Eclaireurs français

In 1911, two interreligious Scouting organizations were founded in France: the Eclaireurs de France (EdF) by Nicolas Benoit and the Eclaireurs Français (EF) by Pierre de Coubertin. Three years later, the first Guide groups emerged. They formed the Fédération des Eclaireuses (FEE) in 1921. In the same year the EdF started the Cub Scout section; Rovering followed in 1926.

In the 1930s, André Lefèvre, chief of the Eclaireurs de France, set up a training camp for 60 Scoutmasters from all over French Indochina.

During World War II, the EdF was among the founding members of the Fédération du Scoutisme Français in 1941. In 1947 some leaders left the EdF for its laical attitude and founded the Eclaireurs Neutres de France with a more positive position to religion. Despite this the membership of the EdF reached 50,000 Scouts in 1948.

The Eclaireurs de France and the Fédération des Eclaireuses started a process of mutual approach in 1949. This led to joint national jamborees and finally led to the merger of the EdF, the EF and the FEE in 1964 under the name Eclaireuses et Eclaireurs de France.

In 1989, five local groups left the EEdF forming the Fédération des Eclaireuses et Eclaireurs.

== Program ==
=== Values ===
The EEdF has formulated five core values that are fundamental for the whole association:

- Laïcité: The association and its members respect the diversity of mankind and fight against all types of discrimination and intolerance.
- Coeducation means to educate both girls and boys in the same groups for mutual understanding and acceptance.
- Democracy means to have the choice between equal opportunities, to allow everybody her or his rights and duties to participate in common projects and to take responsibilities.
- Openness and solidarity help to be open to the world and to others and to develop a spirit of exchange and working together.
- Engagement for the environment means to know and understand the world, to act for its protection and to respect its balance and harmony.

=== Sections ===
The association is divided in four sections, distinguished by ages, and a fifth one for leaders:

- Les lutins et lutines (Pixies) - ages 6 to 8
- Les louveteaux et louvettes (Cub Scouts) - ages 8 to 11
- Les éclaireuses et éclaireurs (Guides and Scouts) - ages 11 to 15
- Les aînés ("Elders" - Rover Scouts) - ages 15 to 18
- Les Djaé - ages 18 to 25
- Les responsables d'animation (Leaders) - ages 17 and older

=== Scout Promise ===
The EdF were one of the few Scouting associations who were allowed to use the Alternative Promise by Robert Baden-Powell. This led to grave turbulences in the 1950s and finally to the introduction of a religious formula which may be used by the Scouts and Guides but is not an integral part of the Scout Promise.

== See also ==
- List of Ig Nobel Prize winners
- Scouting in France
