= Girl Guide and Girl Scout =

Guiding organisation membership between the ages of 10 and 14

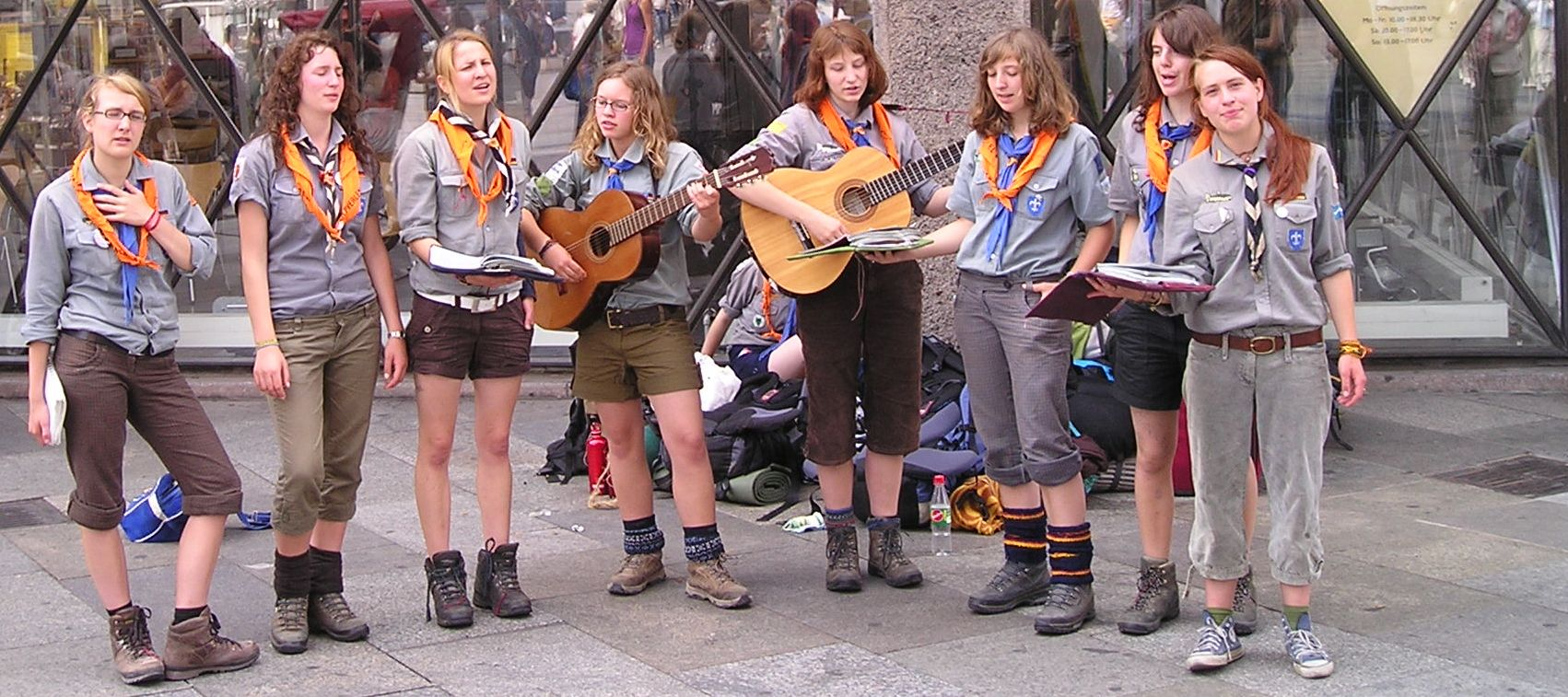
Singing Girl Guides at the German Evangelical Church Congress 2007 in Cologne, Germany

A Girl Guide or Girl Scout is a member of a section of some Guiding organisations who is between the ages of 10 and 14. Age limits are different in each organisation. Girl Scouts and Girl Scout organizations already existed in Britain and other Commonwealth countries when Robert Baden-Powell founded The Girl Guides Association in 1910. There are many Girl Scouts organizations, e.g. the British Girl Scouts and Girl Scouts of the USA. The two terms are used synonymously within this article.

Girl Guides are organised into units/troops averaging 15–30 girls under guidance of a team of leaders. Units subdivide into patrols of about six Guides and engage in outdoor and special interest activities. Units may affiliate with national and international organisations. Some units, especially in Europe, have been co-educational since the 1970s, allowing boys and girls to work together as Scouts. There are other programme sections for older and younger girls.

== Foundation ==
Following the origin of the Boy Scouts in 1907, many girls became Girl Scouts. A group of Girl Scouts were prominent at the Crystal Palace Rally in 1909. The British Boy Scouts expanded to include Girls Scouts in 1910. After Robert Baden-Powell formed The Boy Scouts Association in 1910, he formed The Girl Guides Association and asked his sister Agnes to look after the Girl Guides organisation.

A few years later Baden-Powell's new wife Olave St. Claire Baden-Powell became involved in the Girl Guides Association and, in 1918, she was appointed as its Chief Guide.

== Activities ==
Most activities are now similar to those of Scouts but when the Girl Guides started two central themes were present: domestic skills and "a kind of practical feminism which embodies physical fitness, survival skills, camping, citizenship training, and career preparation".

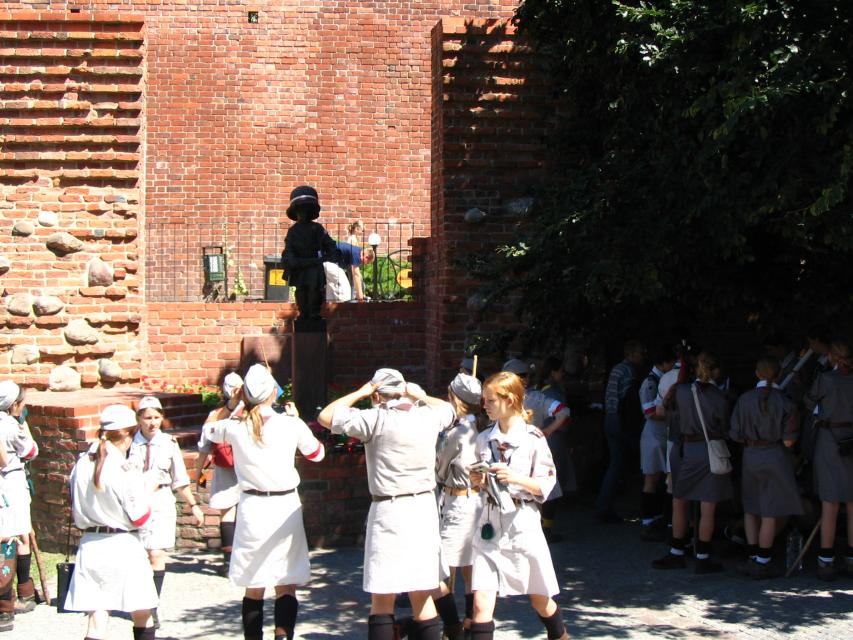
Polish Girl Guides by the monument to the Little Insurrectionist in Warsaw

== Unit affiliation ==
=== Troop ===
Local groups, called variously units, companies or troops, are the fundamental unit of the Girl Guides. These are run by an adult, normally a woman who is between 18 and 65 years of age. She has responsibility for the girls in her group and plans out activities for the girls as well as leading the meetings. These leaders are supported by assistants. Meetings are held anywhere from weekly to monthly depending on the commitments of the participants and the activities in progress.

== See also ==
- World Thinking Day
