= Scouts et Guides de France =

Scouting and guiding organization in France

- Scouts and Guides of France
- Headquarters: Paris
- Country: France
- Founded: 2004
- Membership: 88 580
- Website sgdf.fr

Scouts et Guides de France (Scouts and Guides of France, SGdF) is the largest Scouting and Guiding association in France. It was formed on 1 September 2004 from the merger of two Roman Catholic Scouting organizations: the Guides de France (founded in 1923) and the Scouts de France (SdF, founded 25 July 1920). Through Scoutisme Français, SGdF is a member of both WOSM and WAGGGS.

SGdF claims 61,181 youth members and 27,399 volunteers in 863 local groups. It is active in the rebirth of Scouting in Ukraine and Belarus and strengthening Scouting in French Polynesia. The National Centre of the association is at Chateau de Jambville which is 50 km southwest of Paris.

== History ==
=== SdF Chief Scouts ===
- General Louis de Maud'huy (1920-16 July 1921)
- General Arthur Guyot de Salins 1922-11 August 1936)
- General Joseph Lafont 1936-1944 SdF Chief Scout/Scoutisme Français Chief Scout 1948

=== Honorary President ===
- Maréchal Hubert Lyautey 1925 - 1934

=== General Commissioners ===
- Père Jacques Sevin S.J. 1920 - 1924
- undocumented between 1924 and 1932
- René Lhopital 1932-1936
- Henri Gasnier 1936 - 1939
- Henry Dhavernas 1939 (provisional)
- Eugène Dary 1940-1944 Pierre Delsuc General Commissioner of zone Nord 1941- 1944
- Pierre Delsuc 1944 - 1946
- Georges Gaultier 1946-1953
- Michel Rigal 1953-1970
- Emile-Xavier Visseaux 1970-1975
- Dominique Bénard 1975 - 1983
- Robert Wettstein 1983 - 1989
- Bertrand Chanzy 1989-1995
- Philippe Da Costa 1995-2002
- Claude Moraël 2002-2004

=== Guides de France ===
==== Chief Guide ====
- Albertine Duhamel 1924 - 1933
- Marie Thérèse de Kerraoul 1933 - 1954

==== General Commissioners ====
- Andrée Dalberto 1948 - 1953
- Antoinette Reille 1953
- Marie-Thérèse Cheroutre 1953-1979
- Monique Mitrani 1979-?
- Caline Forest
- Claude Mangin ?-1997
- Hélène de la Messelière 1997-2003

==== Vice President delegate ====
- Françoise Parmentier 2003-2004

=== Scouts et Guides de France ===
==== General Delegates ====
- Claude Moraël 2004-2008
- Philipe Bancon 2008-2013
- Catherine Larrieu 2013-2016
- Christian Larcher 2016-2016
- Olivier Mathieu 2016-2021
- Anne-Claire Bellay-Huet 2021-present

==== Presidents ====
- Hélène Renard 2004
- Guillaume Légaut 2004-2011
- Gilles Vermot-Desroches 2011-2017
- Marie-Astrid Mullet-Abrassart 2017-present

== Programme ==
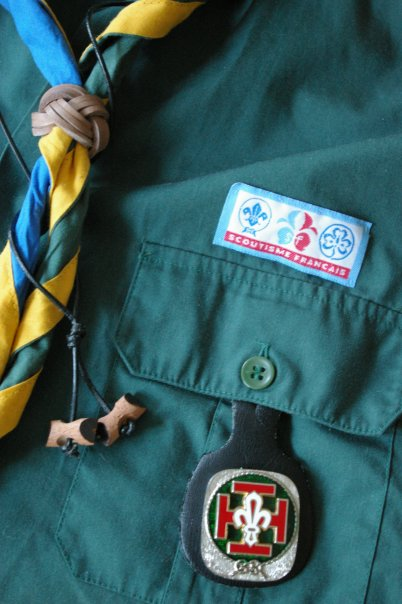
Uniform of a Scouts de France leader

Programme Sections:

- Farfadets (Beavers): ages 6 to 8
- Louveteaux/Jeannettes (Cubs): ages 8 to 12
- Scouts/Guides: ages 11 to 15
- Pionniers/Caravelles (Venturer): ages 14 to 17
- Compagnons (Rovers): ages 17 to 21
- Mousses (Sea Scouts): ages 14 to 17
- Vent du Large: handicapped division

The Scout motto is Toujours Prêt, Always Prepared in French.

Scout Oath (SdF):

Sur mon honneur, et avec la grâce de Dieu, je m'engage a servir de mon mieux, Dieu, l'Église et la patrie, à aider mon prochain en toutes circonstances et à observer la loi scoute.

On my honor and with the grace of God, I promise to do my best to serve God, the Church and my country, to help my neighbour in any circumstance and to observe the Scout Law.

Scout Law (SdF):

1964 Version:

1. Le scout met son honneur à mériter confiance.
  The Scout must strive to be trustworthy.
2. Le scout est loyal à son pays, ses parents, ses chefs et ses subordonnés.
  The Scout is loyal to his country, his parents, his leaders and his subordinates.
3. Le scout est fait pour servir et sauver son prochain.
  The Scout must serve and save his neighbour.
4. Le scout est l'ami de tous et l'ami de tout autre Scout.
  The Scout is a friend of everybody and all other Scouts.
5. Le scout est courtois et chevaleresque.
  The Scout is polite and chivalrous.
6. Le scout voit dans la nature l'oeuvre de Dieu, il aime les plantes et les animaux.
  The Scout sees God's work in nature. He loves plants and animals.
7. Le scout obéit sans réplique et ne fait rien à moitié.
  The Scout obeys without replying and does nothing by halves.
8. Le scout est maître de soi, il sourit et chante dans les difficultés.
  The Scout is his own master, smiling and singing during hardships.
9. Le scout est économe et prend soin du bien d'autrui.
  The Scout is sparing and takes care of what is others.
10. Le scout est pur dans ses pensées, ses paroles et ses actes.
  The Scout must be pure in his thoughts, words and actions.

Current version:

- Le scout tient parole. En patrouille, je m’affirme et je fais des choix.
  The Scout keeps his word. In my patrol, I stand my ground and I make decisions.
- Le scout développe ses talents. En patrouille, j’invente et j’explore.
  The Scout develops his talents. In my patrol, I invent and I explore.
- Le scout a l’esprit d’équipe. En patrouille, j’accueille et je rends service.
  The Scout has team spirit. In my patrol, I accept everybody and I serve.
- Le scout prend soin de son corps. En patrouille, je me dépasse.
  The Scout takes care for his body. In my patrol, I surpass myself.
- Dieu propose au scout, un chemin. En patrouille, je découvre en Jésus un ami.
  God proposes a way to the Scout. In my patrol, I discover a friend in Jesus.
- Le scout respecte l’autre. Fille ou garçon, j’exprime mes sentiments.
  The Scout respects other people. Girl or boy, I express my feelings.

== Emblems ==
The red Jerusalem Cross with the fleur-de-lis was the symbol of the Scouts de France. It was designed by Father Jacques Sévin SJ, co-founder of the Fédération des Scouts de France. The Guides de France used the same Jerusalem Cross with a superimposed trefoil. The emblem of the merged organization combines elements of both predecessors. The round orange background recalls the rope circle, which symbolizes the strength of the Movement.

Historic emblem of the Guides de France

== Training centre ==
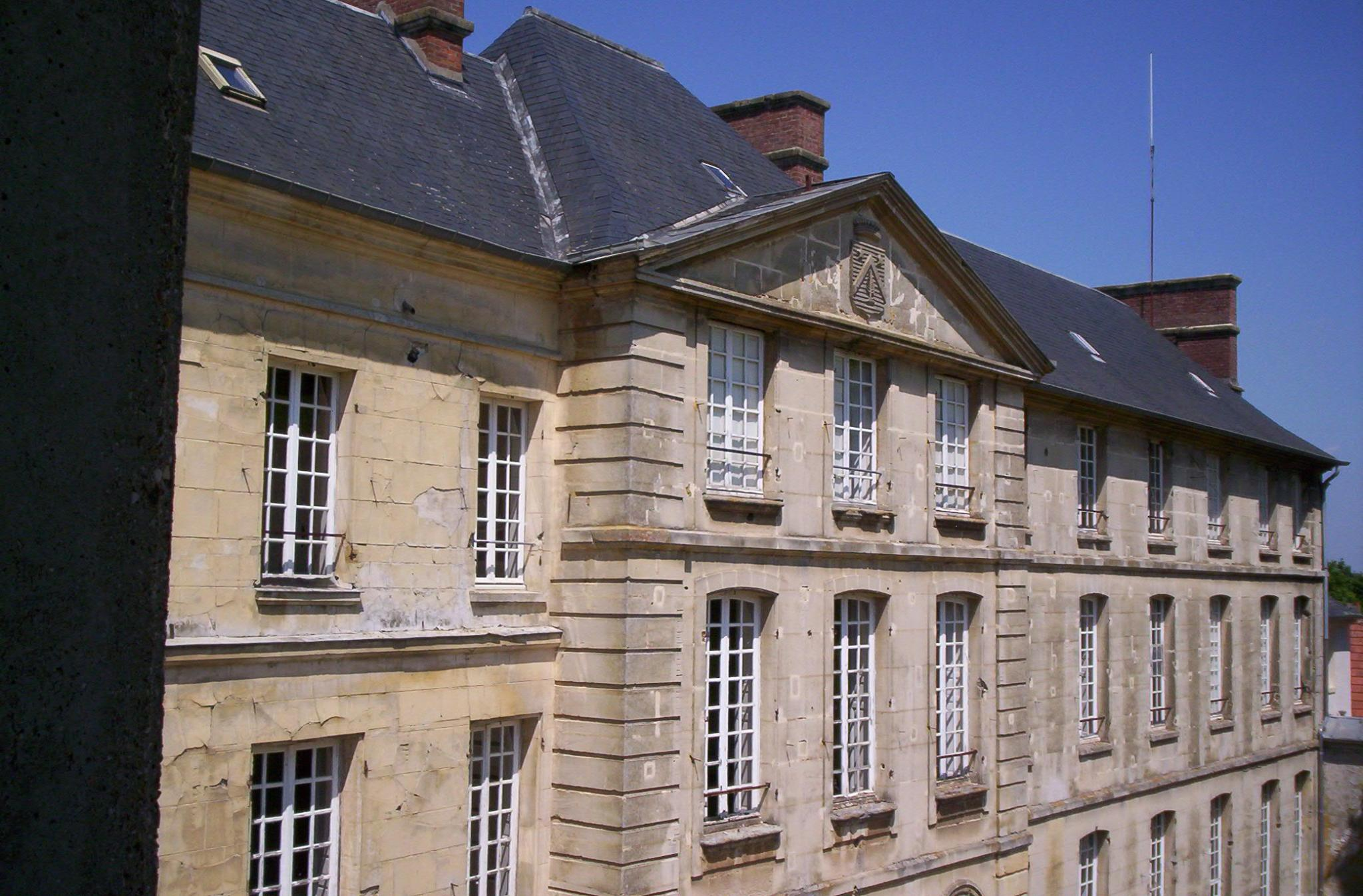
Jambville castle

The Centre national de formation des Scouts et Guides de France (National Training Centre of the Scouts and Guides of France) is located in Jambville, France. Each year, more than 2,000 people attend the courses. With 27 meeting rooms, 200 beds in rooms or dormitories and a dining hall with 400 seats, the center has the necessary infrastructure to accommodate many people.

The garden of the castle, built in the 18th century, covers nearly 52 hectares, half meadow and half forest. Every two years, it hosts the meeting of the young Christians of Île-de-France, the FRAT.

In 1952, the Chateau de Jambville was purchased by the Scouts de France after the new owners of castle of Chamarande, the previous training center, decided not to rent their castle to the Scouts any longer.

Events:

- Every two years (odd years), the castle hosts the FRAT (12,000 young people).
- In 1952, national days of the Scouts de France.
- In 1975, the first national jamboree of the Guides de France (Pari 75).
- In 1975, the first national jamboree of Scouts de France (Aujourd'hui construisons demain - Today we are building tomorrow.).
- In 1983, national days of Scouts de France where the Scouts de France's charter was proclaimed.
- In 1989, national camp of Scoutisme Français for the preparation of the World Scout Conference in 1990.
- In 1991, national jamboree of Scouts de France (Terres d'aventures - Land of adventure).
- In 1997, national jamboree of Scouts de France (Choisis ta vie! - Choose your life).
- In 2006, the first national meeting of Scouts et Guides de France (Paroles de liberté, paroles d'avenir - Words of freedom, Words of future).
- In 2006, the first national jamboree of Scouts et Guides de France (Quels talents! - What talents!).
- In 2011, national meeting of Scouts et Guides de France.
- In 2012, national jamboree of Scouts et Guides de France (Vis tes rêves - Live your dreams).
- In 2016, European camp of World Scout Movement & World Association of Girl Guides and Girl Scouts. Roverway 2016 ("#SurLaRoute" - #OnTheRoad)

== Literature ==
- Le scoutisme, from father Jacques Sévin
- Pour penser scoutement, from father Jacques Sévin
- Philippe Laneyrie, Les scouts de France, Editions du Cerf, ISBN 2-204-02318-3

== See also ==
- Scouting in France
