= List of World Association of Girl Guides and Girl Scouts members =

This is a list of World Association of Girl Guides and Girl Scouts members.

== Table of members ==
The World Association of Girl Guides and Girl Scouts recognizes at most one Guiding organization per country. Some countries have several organizations combined as a federation, with different component groups divided on the basis of religions (France, Denmark), ethnic identification (Israel) or language (Belgium).

Country	Member organization	Membership status	Membership (from 2012 or most recent)	Year Guiding organization joined WAGGGS	Year Guiding was introduced	Admits girls/boys
Albania	Girl Scouts of Albania (Vajzat Udhëheqëse të Shqipërisë)	associate	253	2017	2016	girls-only
Antigua and Barbuda	The Girl Guides Association of Antigua and Barbuda	full	662	1984	1931	girls-only
Argentina	Asociación Guías Argentinas	full	4,826	1958	1915	girls-only
Armenia	National Association of Girl Guides and Girl Scouts of Armenia	full	1,065	2001	1988	girls-only
Aruba	Het Arubaanse Padvindsters Gilde	full	326	1993	1941	girls-only
Australia	Girl Guides Australia	full	25,077	1928	1910	girls-only
Austria	Pfadfinder und Pfadfinderinnen Österreichs	full	9,983	1957	1914	both
Azerbaijan	Association of Scouts of Azerbaijan	full	ca. 600	2017	1996	both
Bahamas	The Bahamas Girl Guides Association	full	2,351	1975	1915	girls-only
Bahrain	The Girl Guides Association of Bahrain	full	2,647	1981	1970	girls-only
Bangladesh	Bangladesh Girl Guides Association	full	93,323	1973	1928	girls-only
Barbados	The Girl Guides Association of Barbados	full	2,668	1969	1918	girls-only
Belarus	The Association of Belarusian Guides	full	1,224	1996	1926	girls-only
Belgium	Guides and Scouts Movement of Belgium	full	56,879	1928	1915	both
Belize	The Girl Guides Association of Belize	full	532	1987	1937	girls-only
Benin	Guides du Bénin	full	2,306	1963	1954	girls-only
Bolivia	Asociación de Guías Scouts de Bolivia	full	221	1966	1915	girls-only
Botswana	Botswana Girl Guides Association	full	9,825	1969	1924	girls-only
Brazil	Federação de Bandeirantes do Brasil	full	10,789	1930	1919	both
Brunei	Girl Guides Association of Brunei Darussalam	full	1,677	1996	1951	girls-only
Burkina Faso	Association des Guides du Burkina Faso	full	16,333	1972	1955	girls-only
Burundi	Association des Guides du Burundi	full	19,929	1972	1954	girls-only
Cambodia	Girl Guides Association of Cambodia	full	4,551	2002	1940	girls-only
Cameroon	Association des Guides du Cameroun	full	5,350	1972	1943	girls-only
Canada	Girl Guides of Canada	full	92,000	1928	1910	girls-only
Central African Republic	Association Nationale des Guides de Centrafrique	full	7,125	1963	1952	girls-only
Chad	Association des Guides du Tchad	full	7,112	NA	1957	girls-only
Chile	Asociación de Guías y Scouts de Chile	full	19,337	1957	1913	both
Republic of China (Taiwan)	Girl Scouts of Taiwan	full	17,436	1963	1919	girls-only
Colombia	Asociación de Guías Scouts de Colombia	full	291	1954	1936	girls-only
Democratic Republic of the Congo	Guides de la République Démocratique du Congo	full	13,958	1972/2008	1928	girls-only
Republic of the Congo	Association des Scouts et Guides du Congo	full	5,770	1957/1996	1927	both
Cook Islands	The Girl Guides Cook Islands Association	full	700	1993	1928	girls-only
Costa Rica	Asociación de Guías y Scouts de Costa Rica	full	5,414	1946	1922	both
Croatia	Savez izviđača Hrvatske	full	3,228	2023	1915	both
Cyprus	Girl Guides Association of Cyprus	full	1,754	1962	1912	both
Czech Republic	Junák	full	19,143	1928/1990	1915	both
Denmark	Pigespejdernes Fællesråd Danmark	full	17,403	1928	1910	both
Dominica	The Girl Guides Association of Dominica	full	962	1987	1930	girls-only
Dominican Republic	Asociación de Guías Scouts Dominicanas	full	348	1969	1961	girls-only
Ecuador	Asociación Nacional de Guías Scouts del Ecuador	full	124	1966	1919	girls-only
Egypt	Egyptian Federation for Scouts and Girl Guides	full	39,995	1931	1913	girls-only
El Salvador	Asociación de Muchachas Guías de El Salvador	full associate	449	1960	1945	girls-only
Estonia	Eesti Gaidide Liit	full	639	1928/1993	1919	both
Eswatini	Eswatini Girl Guides Association	full	3,558	1969	1924	girls-only
Fiji	Fiji Girl Guides Association	full	5,531	1981	1924	girls-only
Finland	Suomen Partiolaiset	full	23,450	1928	1910	both
France	Scoutisme Français	full	41,335	1928	1921	both
Gambia	The Gambia Girl Guides Association	full	17,395	1966	1923	girls-only
Georgia	Sakartvelos Gogona Skautebis Asociacia 'Dia'	associate	192	NA	1992	girls-only
Germany	Ring deutscher Pfadfinder*innenverbände	full	51,749	1950	1912	both
Ghana	The Ghana Girl Guides Association	full	19,191	1960	1921	girls-only
Greece	Soma Hellinikou Odigismou	full	6,589	1933	1932	both
Grenada	The Girl Guides Association of Grenada	full	2,288	1990	1925	girls-only
Guatemala	Asociación Nacional de Muchachas Guías de Guatemala	full	418	1957	1934	girls-only
Guinea	Association Nationale des Guides de Guinée	full	4,880	NA	1990	girls-only
Guyana	Guyana Girl Guides Association	full	1,787	1969	1922	girls-only
Haiti	Association Nationale des Guides d'Haïti	full	1,582	1946	1942	girls-only
Honduras	Asociación Nacional de Muchachas Guías de Honduras	full	142	1981	1953	both
Hong Kong	Hong Kong Girl Guides Association	full	59,030	1978	1916	girls-only (both in Happy Bee Section)
Hungary	Magyar Cserkészlány Szövetség	full	654	1928/1993	1919	girls-only
Iceland	Bandalag Íslenskra Skáta	full	2,048	1928	1922	both
India	The Bharat Scouts and Guides	full	1,780,545	1948	1911	both
Ireland	Council of Irish Guiding Associations	full	15,935	1932	1911	girls-only
Israel	Hitachdut Hatsofim Ve Hatsofot Be Israel	full	11,268	1957	1919	both
Italy	Federazione Italiana dello Scautismo	full	86,114	1946	1912	both
Ivory Coast	Fédération Ivoirienne du Scoutisme Féminin	full	4,146	1963	1937	girls-only
Jamaica	The Girl Guides Association of Jamaica	full	5,903	1963	1915	girls-only
Japan	Girl Scouts of Japan	full	34,927	1952	1919	girls-only
Jordan	Jordanian Association for Boy Scouts and Girl Guides	full	9,080	1963	1938	girls-only
Kenya	Kenya Girl Guides Association	full	159,399	1963	1920	girls-only
Kiribati	The Girl Guides Association of Kiribati	associate	2,833	1990	1926	girls-only
South Korea	Girl Scouts Korea	full	45,139	1957	1946	both
Kuwait	Kuwait Girl Guides Association	full	15,000	1966	1957	girls-only
Latvia	Latvijas Skautu un Gaidu Centrālā Organizācija	full	371	1928/1993	1921	both
Lebanon	Fédération Libanaise des Eclaireuses et des Guides	full	6,772	1955	1937	girls-only
Lesotho	Lesotho Girl Guides Association	full	6,172	1978	1925	girls-only
Liberia	Liberian Girl Guides Association	full	7,297	1928/1966	1920	girls-only
Libya	Public Scout and Girl Guide Movement	full	4,500	1966	1958	both
Liechtenstein	Pfadfinder und Pfadfinderinnen Liechtensteins	full	331	1948	1932	both
Lithuania	Lietuvos skaučių seserija	associate	652	2008		girls-only
Luxembourg	Lëtzebuerger Guiden a Scouten	full	1,649	1928	1915	both
Madagascar	Skotisma Zazavavy eto Madagasikara	full	44,048	1963	1941	both
Malawi	The Malawi Girl Guides Association	full	54,144	NA	1931	girls-only
Malaysia	Persatuan Pandu Puteri Malaysia	full	52,858	1960	1916	girls-only
Maldives	Maldives Girl Guide Association	full	9,474	1994	1962	girls-only
Malta	The Malta Girl Guides Association	full	1,130	1966	1918	girls-only
Mauritania	Association des Scouts et Guides de Mauritanie	associate	500	1996	1986	both
Mauritius	The Mauritius Girl Guides Association	full	953	1975	1926	girls-only
Mexico	Guías de México	full	2,514	1948	1930	girls-only
Monaco	Association des Guides et Scouts de Monaco	full	23	1960	1929	both
Mongolia	Girl Scout Association of Mongolia	full	1,500	2005	1996	girls-only
Myanmar	Myanmar Girl Guides	associate		2014		
Namibia	The Girl Guides Association of Namibia	full	1,680	1993	1923	girls-only
Nepal	Nepal Scouts	full	22,061	1978	1952	both
Netherlands	Scouting Nederland	full	53,796	1928/1981	1911	both
Netherlands Antilles	Padvindstersvereniging van de Nederlandse Antillen	full	255	1978	1930	girls-only
New Zealand	GirlGuiding New Zealand	full	13,220	1928	1908	girls-only
Nicaragua	Federación Nacional de Muchachas Guías de Nicaragua	associate	2,213	1981	1940	girls-only
Niger	Mouvement des Guides et Eclaireuses du Niger	associate	1,429	2017	2002	girls-only
Nigeria	The Nigerian Girl Guides Association	full	120,000	1960	1919	girls-only
Norway	Speidernes Fellesorganisasjon	full	11,792	1928	1912	both
Oman	The National Organisation for Scouts and Guides	full	2,600	1987	1972	both
Pakistan	Pakistan Girl Guides Association	full	110,826	1948	1911	girls-only
Palestine	Palestinian Scout Association	full	5,000	2017	1912	both
Panama	Asociación de Muchachas Guías de Panamá	full	1,026	1952	1950	girls-only
Papua New Guinea	Girl Guides Association of Papua New Guinea	full	3,410	1978	1927	girls-only
Paraguay	Asociación Guías Scouts del Paraguay	full	178	1966	1923	both
Peru	Asociación Nacional de Guías Scouts del Perú	full	2,780	1960	1916	both
Philippines	Girl Scouts of the Philippines	full	692,629	1946	1919	girls-only
Poland	Związek Harcerstwa Polskiego	full	49,304	1928/1996	1910	both
Portugal	Associação Guias de Portugal	full	3,038	1963	1919	girls-only
Qatar	The Scout and Guide Association of Qatar	full	3,480	NA	1995	both
Romania	Asociația Ghidelor și Ghizilor din România	full	1,195	1993	1928	both
Russia	Rossiskaya Assotsiatsia Devochek-Skautov	full	1,997	1999	1910	girls-only
Rwanda	Association des Guides du Rwanda	full	12,492	1981	1962	girls-only
Saint Kitts and Nevis	The Girl Guides Association of Saint Christopher and Nevis	associate	158	1993	1931	girls-only
Saint Lucia	Girl Guides Association of Saint Lucia	full	961	1984	1925	girls-only
Saint Vincent and the Grenadines	Girl Guides Association of Saint Vincent and the Grenadines	full	2,066	1984	1914	girls-only
San Marino	Associazione Guide Esploratori Cattolici Sammarinesi	full	98	1993	1973	both
Senegal	Association des Scouts et Guides du Sénégal	full	5,121	1981	1953	both
Sierra Leone	The Sierra Leone Girl Guides Association	full	1,460	1963	1924	girls-only
Singapore	Girl Guides Singapore	full	9,268	1966	1917	girls-only
Slovakia	Slovenský skauting	full	2,621	1928/1990	1919	both
Slovenia	Združenje slovenskih katoliških skavtinj in skavtov	full	4,373	1928/1996	1922	both
Solomon Islands	The Girl Guides Association of the Solomon Islands	associate	697	1987	1949	girls-only
South Africa	Girl Guides Association of South Africa	full	27,449	1928	1910	girls-only
Spain	Comité de Enlace del Guidismo en España	full	6,785	1959	1929	both
Sri Lanka	The Sri Lanka Girl Guides Association	full	32,817	1951	1917	girls-only
Sudan	The Sudan Girl Guides Association	full	15,580	1957	1928	girls-only
Suriname	Surinaamse Padvindsters Raad	associate	323	1972	1947	girls-only
Sweden	Scouterna	full	28,546	1928	1910	both
Switzerland	Swiss Guide and Scout Movement	full	19,179	1928	1913	both
Syria	Scouts of Syria	full	2,200	2008	1950	both
Tanzania	The Tanzania Girl Guides Association	full	71,236	1963	1928	girls-only
Thailand	The Girl Guides Association of Thailand	full	57,731	1963	1957	girls-only
Togo	Association des Guides du Togo	full	3,236	1963	1942	girls-only
Tonga	The Girl Guides Association of the Kingdom of Tonga	associate	2,238	1987	1952	girls-only
Trinidad and Tobago	The Girl Guides Association of Trinidad and Tobago	full	2,886	1963	1914	girls-only
Tunisia	Les Scouts Tunisiens	full	7,336	1996	1934	both
Turkey	Türkiye İzcilik Federasyonu	full	14,457	1972	1923	both
Uganda	The Uganda Girl Guides Association	full	174,219	1963	1914	girls-only
Ukraine	Asotsiatsiya Haydiv Ukrayiny	full	287	1999 (associate), 2020 (full)	1911/1992	girls-only
United Arab Emirates	Girl Guides Association of the United Arab Emirates	full	5,120	1984	1973	girls-only
United Kingdom	Girlguiding UK	full	554,939	1928	1909	girls-only
United States of America	Girl Scouts of the USA	full	3,169,371	1928	1912	girls-only
Venezuela	Asociación de Guías Scouts de Venezuela	full	522	1960	1958	girls-only
Yemen	Yemen Scouts and Guides Association - Guide branch	full	11,765	1990	1962	girls-only
Zambia	Girl Guides Association of Zambia	full	23,531	1966	1924	girls-only
Zimbabwe	Girl Guides Association of Zimbabwe	full	24,270	1969	1912	girls-only

== Non-sovereign territories with independent WAGGGS member organizations ==
- Aruba - Het Arubaanse Padvindsters Gilde: Associate Member of the World Association of Girl Guides and Girl Scouts
- Cook Islands - The Girl Guides Cook Islands Association: Associate Member of the World Association of Girl Guides and Girl Scouts
- Hong Kong - Hong Kong Girl Guides Association: Full Member of the World Association of Girl Guides and Girl Scouts
- Netherlands Antilles - Padvindstersvereniging van de Nederlandse Antillen: Full Member of the World Association of Girl Guides and Girl Scouts

== Sovereign countries with Guiding run by another sovereign state ==
=== Girl Scouts of the USA ===
- Federated States of Micronesia - Scouting in the Federated States of Micronesia - Girl Scouts of the USA
- Marshall Islands - Scouting in the Marshall Islands - Girl Scouts of the USA
- Palau - Scouting in Palau - Girl Scouts of the USA

== Non-sovereign territories with Guiding run by a sovereign state ==
=== Denmark ===
- Faroe Islands - Føroya Skótaráð
- Greenland - Grønlands Spejderkorps

=== France ===
Guiding in the following areas is run by different French Scout associations:

- French Guiana - Scouting in French Guiana
- Guadeloupe and Saint Martin - Scouting in Guadeloupe et Saint Martin
- Martinique - Scouts et Guides de Martinique
- Mayotte - Scouting in Mayotte
- New Caledonia - Scouting in New Caledonia
- Réunion - Scouting on Réunion
- Saint Pierre and Miquelon - Scouting in Saint Pierre and Miquelon
- Wallis and Futuna - Scouting in Wallis and Futuna

=== United Kingdom ===
- Anguilla - Girlguiding Anguilla
- Bermuda - Girlguiding Bermuda
- British Virgin Islands - British Virgin Islands Girl Guide Association
- Cayman Islands - Girlguiding Cayman Islands
- Falkland Islands - Girlguiding Falkland Islands
- Gibraltar - Girlguiding Gibraltar
- Montserrat - Girlguiding Montserrat
- Saint Helena - Girlguiding Saint Helena
- Turks and Caicos Islands - Turks and Caicos Islands branch of Girlguiding UK

=== United States ===
The following areas are administered by the Girl Scouts of the USA:

- American Samoa - Scouting in American Samoa
- Guam - Scouting in Guam
- Northern Mariana Islands - Scouting in the Northern Mariana Islands
- Puerto Rico - Scouting in Puerto Rico
- United States Virgin Islands - Scouting in the United States Virgin Islands

== Countries working towards WAGGGS membership ==
"Working towards WAGGGS membership" is an official status by WAGGGS acknowledging the development of an association. As of 2017, three countries have this status:

- Mozambique - Mozambique Guides
- São Tomé and Príncipe - Associação Guias de São Tomé and Príncipe
- Vietnam - Vietnam Scouting National Council (Girl Guides section)

== Countries with Guiding organizations, work towards recognition unclear ==
- Algeria - Scouting in Algeria
- Iraq - Iraq Boy Scouts and Girl Guides Council
- Morocco - Scouting in Morocco
- Nauru - Scouting and Guiding in Nauru

== Former members of WAGGGS ==
- Cuba - Asociación de Guías de Cuba, last mentioned in 1969
- Ethiopia - last mentioned in 1984, now part of Ethiopia Scout Association
- Indonesia - Gerakan Pramuka left WAGGGS and joined WOSM in 2002
- Iran - Fereshtegan-e Pishahang-e Īrān, last mentioned in 1979
- Samoa - Samoa Girl Guides Association, membership cancelled in 2008
- Tuvalu - Girl Guides Association of Tuvalu, membership withdrawn in 2005
- Uruguay - Asociación Guías Scout del Uruguay, membership cancelled in 2014
- Vanuatu - Vanuatu Girl Guides Association, membership cancelled in 2008
- Vietnam - Hội Nữ Hướng Đạo Việt Nam, last mentioned in 1973

== See also ==
- List of World Organization of the Scout Movement members
