= Scouting and Guiding in the Dutch Caribbean =

Scouting and Guiding movement in the Dutch Caribbean

The Scout and Guide movement in the Dutch Caribbean is served by

- Aruba
  - see Scouting and Guiding on Aruba
- Curaçao
  - Padvindstersvereniging van de Nederlandse Antillen, member of the World Association of Girl Guides and Girl Scouts
  - Scouting Antiano, member of the World Organization of the Scout Movement
  - Vereniging voor Oudpadvindsters "Copernicia", member of the International Scout and Guide Fellowship
  - Independent Scouts of Curaçao, member of the World Federation of Independent Scouts
  - Antilliaans Jongens & Meisjes Gilde, Curaçao
  - Jeugd Luchtvaart Brigade, Curaçao
  - Jonge Wacht Curaçao
- Sint Maarten
  - Scouting Antiano
  - 7th Day Adventists Pathfinders, St. Maarten
  - Boys Brigade St. Maarten
  - Girls Brigade St. Maarten
- Bonaire
  - Scouting Antiano
  - Padvindstersvereniging van de Nederlandse Antillen
- Sint Eustatius
  - Boys Brigade St. Eustatius
  - Garfield Pathfinders Club, St. Eustatius
  - Girls Brigade St. Eustatius
- Saba
  - Sea Scouts Saba
  - Child Focus Foundation Saba (a variety of activities, including Sea Scouts)
  - The Saba Girls and Boys Sports Society (originally Saba Girls and Boys Scouts)
