= Scouting and Guiding in Vanuatu =

The Scout and Guide movement in Vanuatu is served by two organisations

- Vanuatu Girl Guides Association, member of the World Association of Girl Guides and Girl Scouts
- Vanuatu branch of The Scout Association
