= Scouting and Guiding in Tuvalu =

The Scout and Guide movement in Tuvalu is served by:

- Girl Guides Association of Tuvalu, former member of the World Association of Girl Guides and Girl Scouts
- Tuvalu Scout Association, member of the World Organization of the Scout Movement

== Sources ==
- World Association of Girl Guides and Girl Scouts, World Bureau (2002), Trefoil Round the World. Eleventh Edition 1997. ISBN 0-900827-75-0
