= Scouting and Guiding in Togo =

Scouting and Guiding associations in Togo

The scouting and Girl Guides movement in Togo is served by:

- Association des Guides du Togo, member of the World Association of Girl Guides and Girl Scouts
- Association Scoute du Togo, member of the World Organization of the Scout Movement
