= Scouting and Guiding in Suriname =

Scouting and Guiding associations in Suriname

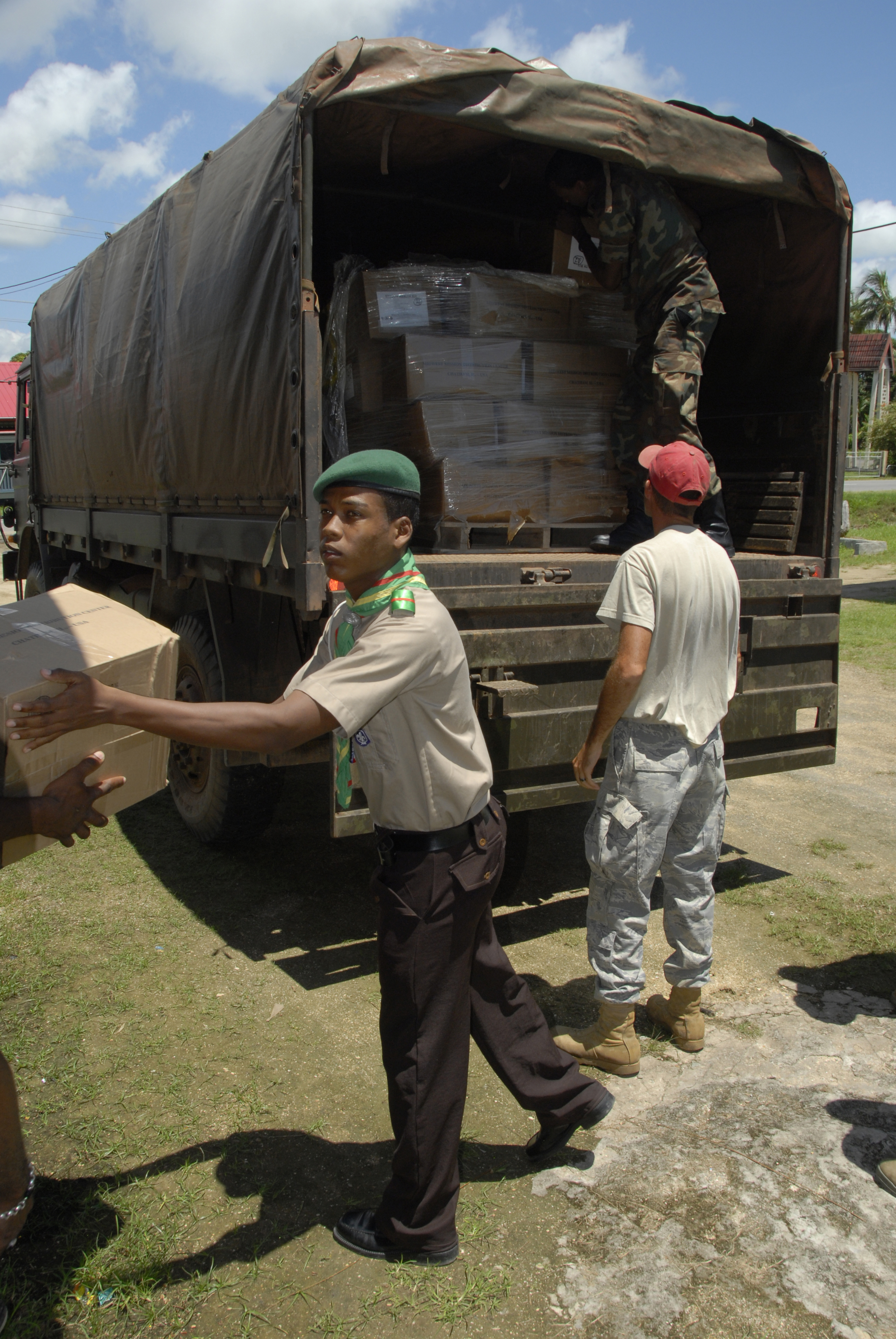
Boy Scouts van Suriname and U.S. military personnel unload a donation of school supplies and dental hygiene kits, 2011.

The Scout and Guide movement in Suriname is served by

- Surinaamse Padvindsters Raad, member of the World Association of Girl Guides and Girl Scouts
- Boy Scouts van Suriname, member of the World Organization of the Scout Movement
- Gidsen Suriname, the Catholic Guide and Scouts organisation.
