= Scouting and Guiding on Aruba =

Scouting and Guiding movement in Aruba

The Scout and Guide movement in Aruba is served by

- Het Arubaanse Padvindsters Gilde, member of the World Association of Girl Guides and Girl Scouts
- Scouting Aruba, member of the World Organization of the Scout Movement
- Seal Scouting Aruba
- Antilliaans Jongens & Meisjes Gilde district Aruba
