= Scouting and Guiding in the Central African Republic =

Scouting and Guiding associations in the Central African Republic

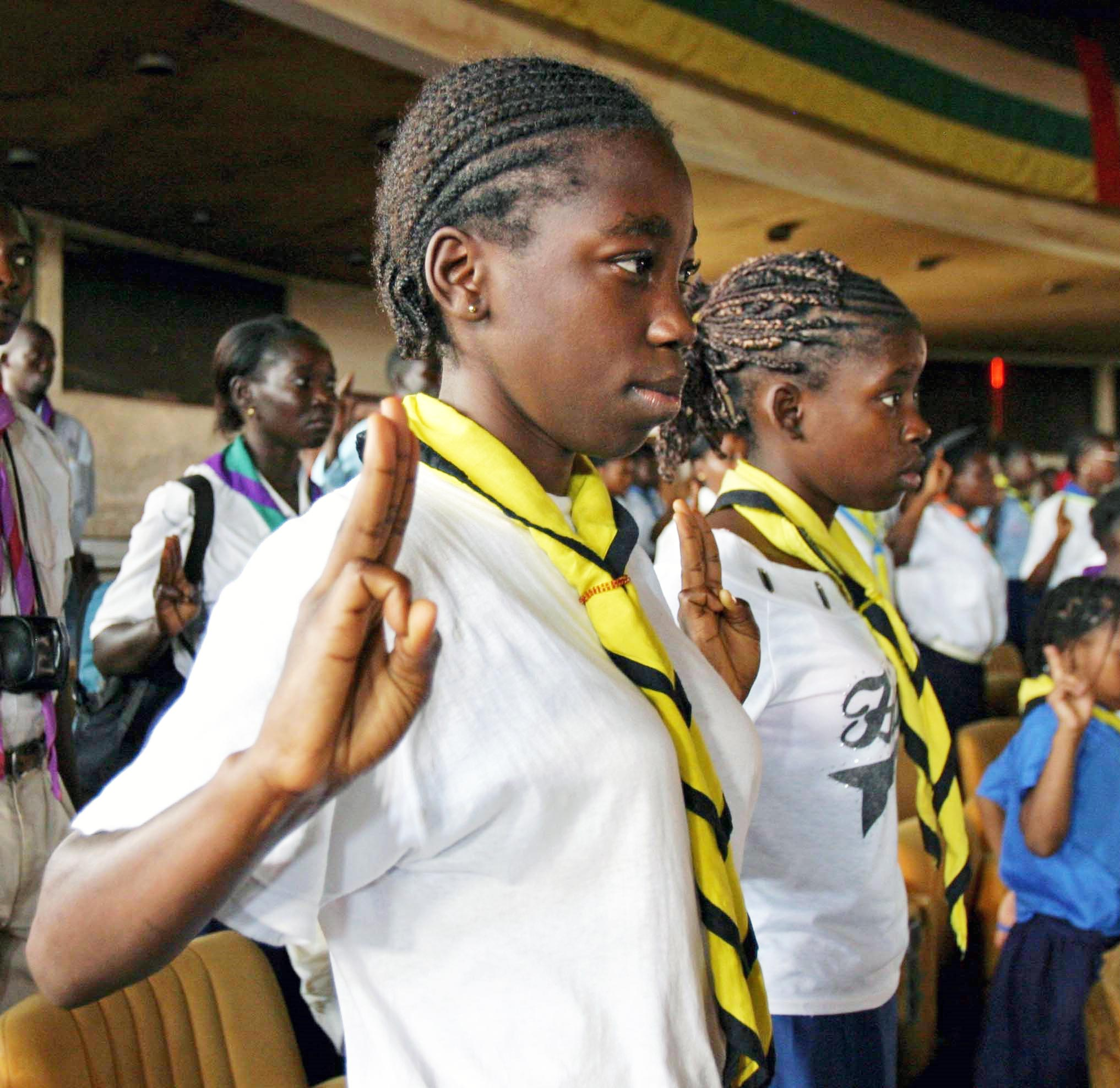
Girl Guides in the Central African Republic

The Scout and Guide movement in the Central African Republic is served by

- Association Nationale des Guides de Centrafrique, member of the World Association of Girl Guides and Girl Scouts
- Fédération du scoutisme centrafricain, former member of the World Organization of the Scout Movement
