= Juniorvlet =

The Juniorvlet is a steel sailing and rowing boat. It is used by the Sea Scouts of Scouting Nederland in the Netherlands. It is a smaller version of the Lelievlet craft, special designed for ages 8 to 13 years. Like a Lelievlet it can be used for Sculling, rowing and sailing. There are around 40 juniorvlets in use.

== Details and specifications ==
- Length: 4.00 m
- Width: 1.62 m
- Height: 4.00 m
- Avg. Weight: 350 kg
- Sail: 7.00 m^{2}
