= Scouting and Guiding in Belize =

Scouting and Guiding movement in Belize

The Scout and Guide movement in Belize is served by The Girl Guides Association of Belize, a member of the World Association of Girl Guides and Girl Scouts and The Scout Association of Belize, a member of the World Organization of the Scout Movement.

== History ==
=== Early independent Boy Scouts ===
According to research undertaken by Hr. Leopold Flowers, former Executive Commissioner of The Scout Association of Belize, and William Faux, presently Deputy Chief Commissioner, Scouting in Belize was started in 1910 when Henry Longsworth of St. John's Cathedral established a troop there.

The oldest records found to date in England indicates that Scouting started in British Honduras in 1911 with two troops, 20 Scouts in total. The following year the numbers were one troop, three Scouters and 24 Scouts, a total of 27.

=== British Boy Scouts ===
There is record of the British Boy Scouts (a separate organization to The Scout Association of the United Kingdom) operating in Belize from 1910.

=== The Boy Scouts Association, British Honduras Branch / The Scout Association of Belize ===
The Scout Association of Belize was founded as a branch of The Boy Scouts Association of the United Kingdom. The Boy Scouts Association, British Honduras branch was registered in 1917 with a census of eight Scouters, 113 Scouts and 59 Cubs, a total membership of 180.

In 1915, Robin O. Phillips, a Boy Scouts of America scout, about 17 years old, is said to have invested 20 young men as Scouts. This took place at Robin's home, then situated at the corner of Wilson Street and Barrack Road. When these Scouts were considered well trained, Robin's father approached Governor William Hart-Bennett to seek assistance and support for the Scout Movement. Governor Bennett then selected George Grabbam, then manager of the Belize Estate and Produce Company Ltd. Mr. Grabham in turn appointed as Scoutmasters to assist him Phillip Ely, a Mr. Wexham and Paul Shephard Berry, then the superintendent of the Belize Wireless Station. In 1917, these men formed a branch of The Boy Scouts Association of the United Kingdom. The association flourished for about three to four years, then ceased when Mr. Grabham left Belize.

Scouting was revived again in 1931 in the Belize City area, by Brother John Mark Jacoby, SJ, MBE, Professor of Mathematics at Saint John's College. Hundreds of boys, including many leading citizens, passed through the hands of 'Bra Jake', as he was affectionately known. For many years, Scouting revolved around activities held at the Holy Redeemer Scout room (the home of troops 1, 2 and 3) and at an annual summer camp at San Pedro, Ambergris Caye. In 1936 Scouting was introduced to the districts beginning with the Stann Creek District and eventually spreading to all the others. Since that time the association has always been active in the Belize. The level of this activity has varied considerably over the years, depending largely on the extent of the association's ability to attract and maintain committed voluntary leadership.

The Boy Scouts Association, British Honduras Branch changed its name to The Scout Association of Belize. The association exists by virtue of the Scout Association of Belize Act, 1987 (assented to on January 25, 1988). On December 15, 1987, The Scout Association of Belize became a direct member organization of the World Organization of the Scout Movement rather than being represented through its parent organization, The Scout Association in London.
