= Scouting and Guiding in the Cook Islands =

Scout and Guide movement in the Cook Islands

The Scout and Guide movement in the Cook Islands is served by two organisations

- The Girl Guides Cook Islands Association, member of the World Association of Girl Guides and Girl Scouts
- Cook Islands Boy Scout Association
