= Scouting Nederland =

National Scout organisation of the Netherlands

- Headquarters: Zeewolde
- Country: Netherlands
- Founded: 1911/1973
- Membership: 110,000
- Patron: Queen Máxima
- Affiliation: World Association of Girl Guides and Girl Scouts, World Organization of the Scout Movement
- Website http://www.scouting.nl
- colours for ages above 14

Scouting Nederland is the national Scout organisation of the Netherlands with approximately 110,000 members (53,324 male and 54,663 female) and 87,000 youth members, as of 2010.

The official patron of Scouting Nederland is Queen Máxima, the wife of the Dutch King, Willem-Alexander. From 2005 Scouting Nederland has been affiliated with the International Scout and Guide Fellowship.

== History ==
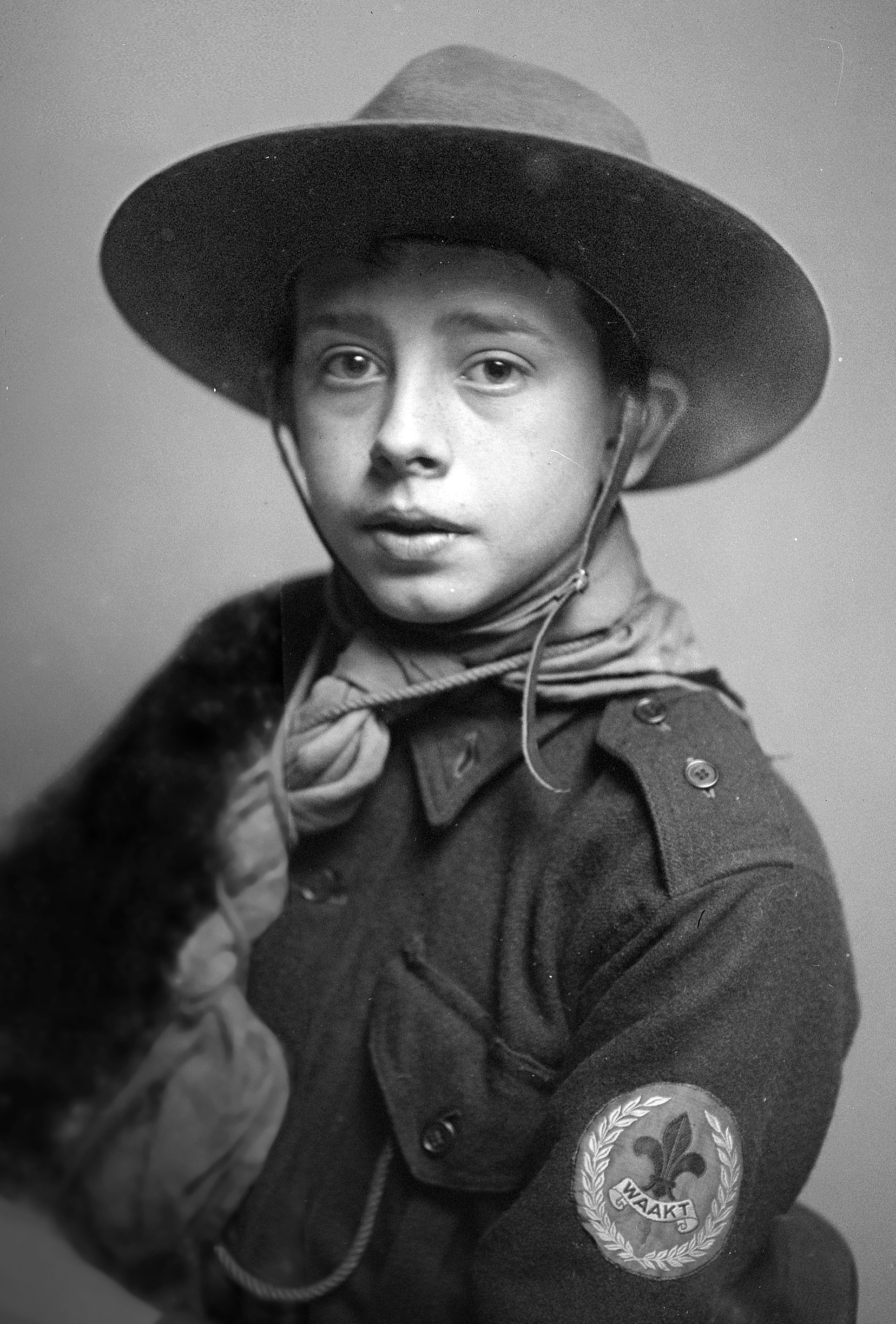
Member "De Nederlandse Padvinders" ~ 1916

Scouting for boys was started in the Netherlands in the summer of 1910 when the first Scout troops were formed in a few cities. Scouting started about a year later for girls. Dutch Scouts were among the founding members of World Association of Girl Guides and Girl Scouts in 1928 and also among the charter members of the World Organization of the Scout Movement in 1920.

On 7 January 1911 the first national organisation was founded, the Nederlandsche Padvinders Organisatie (NPO, Netherlands Pathfinder Organisation). They merged with the Nederlandsche Padvinders Bond (NPB, Netherlands Pathfinder Federation) on 11 December 1915 and became known as De Nederlandse Padvinders (NPV, Netherlands Pathfinders). In 1933 some Scout Groups broke away from the NPV to form the Padvinders Vereniging Nederland (PVN, Pathfinder Association the Netherlands), because difficulties concerning the Scout Promise arose. The difficulty was that boys who recognised no god still had to promise "To do my duty to God and my country". The Scout Groups found that one grew hypocrites this way. The NPV and the PVN almost reunited in 1940. The PVN was not refounded after World War II. Although the NPV was open to boys of all religions, a Roman Catholic organisation was founded in 1930, the Katholieke Verkenners (KV, Catholic Scouts). First inside the NPV, but after 1938 as a separate organisation. After World War II the Roman Catholic Church wanted to merge all Roman Catholic youth organisations. After negotiations the Katholieke Verkenners were allowed to go on as Verkenners van de Katholieke Jeugdbeweging (Scouts of the Catholic youth movement). The Katholieke Verkenners became a separate organisation again in 1961.

Girls got their first own organisation in 1911, Eerste Nederlandsche Meisjes Gezellen Vereeniging (E.N.M.G.V., First Dutch Girls Companions Society), but this organisation never got many members. Girls had also been member of the NPO but the NPV was boys only. On 16 January 1916 the Het Nederlandsche Meisjesgilde (NMG, Dutch Girls Guild) started, which later changed its name to Het Nederlandse Padvindsters Gilde (NPG, Dutch Girl-pathfinders Guild), followed in 1945 by the founding of a separate Catholic organisation, the Nederlandse Gidsenbeweging (NGB, Dutch Guide Movement), which later changed its name to Nederlandse Gidsen (NG, Dutch Guides).

During World War II all Scouting movements were prohibited and officially dissolved in the Netherlands, because the organizations refused to merge with National Youth Storm, the Dutch Nazi youth organization. Still, many continued their activities secretly. After the end of the war, Scouting again became very popular and therefore many of the current local Scout Groups in the Netherlands were founded in 1945 or 1946.

The four separate organisations (NPV, KV, NPG and NG) existed until 1973, when they all merged into Scouting Nederland (SN).

=== Emblems ===
Emblem of De Nederlandsche Padvinders Organisatie
1911 - 1915

Emblem of Eerste Nederlandsche Meisjes Gezellen Vereeniging
1911 - ~ 1916

Emblem of De Nederlandsche Padvindersbond
1912 - 1915

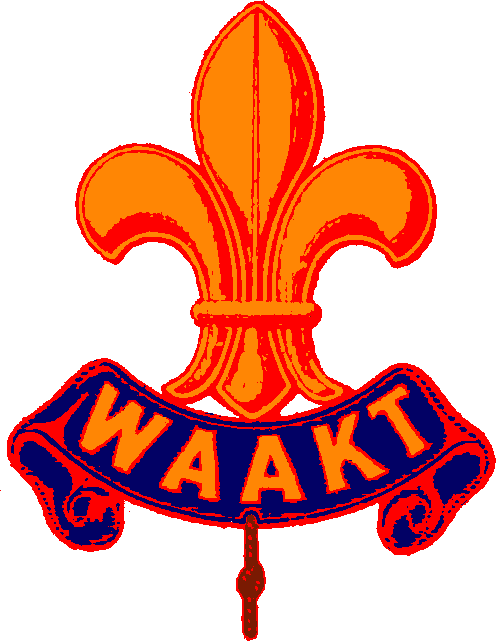
Emblem of De Nederlandse Padvinders
1915 - 1929

Emblem of Het Nederlandse meisjesgilde
1916 - 1933
Het Nederlandse Padvindstersgilde
1933 - 1936

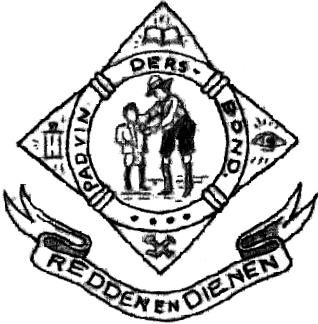
Emblem of Leger des Heils Padvindersbond
1922 - 1948

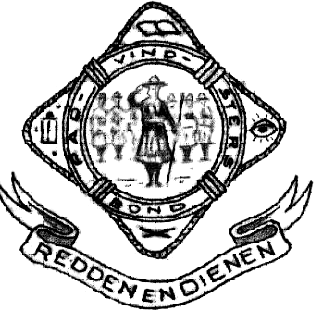
Emblem of Leger des Heils Padvindstersbond
1923 - 1948

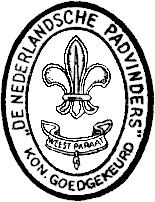
Emblem of De Nederlandse Padvinders
1929 - 1973

Emblem of De Katholieke Verkenners
1930 - 1973

Emblem of Padvinders Vereeniging Nederland
1933 - 1940

Emblem of Het Nederlandse Padvindstersgilde
1936 - ~1950

Emblem of Nederlandse Gidsen(beweging)
1945 - 1973

Emblem of Katholieke Jeugdbeweging
1946 - 1961

Emblem of Het Nederlandse Padvindstersgilde
~1950 - 1973

The emblem of "De Nederlandse Padvinders" consisted of a Fleur-de-lis and a banner with the Scout Motto "Weest Paraat". The emblem of "Het Nederlandse Padvindstersgilde" (NPG) consisted of a ten-point white star for the ten lines in the Girl Scouts law on a blue Trefoil for Girl Scouting/Guiding with the Scout Motto "Wees Bereid", variants are still in use by Het Surinaamse Padvindsters Gilde, Het Arubaanse Padvindsters Gilde and Padvindstersvereniging van de Nederlandse Antillen. Before 1936 the NPG had the same emblem with an eight-point star because of an eight-point law. Het Nederlandsche Meisjesgilde had the same emblem with an eight-point star but with the letters NMG. The emblem of the "Katholieke Verkenners", consisted of a Fleur-de-lis for Boy Scouts, on a cross potent for Catholic Scouts, a variant was used by the Katholieke Verkenners Suriname. The emblem of the Nederlandse Gidsen (Beweging) consisted of a light blue Trefoil for Girl Scouting/Guiding on a yellow Cross potent for Roman Catholic Scouting/Guiding, a variant is still in use by the Gidsen Suriname. The emblems of the Leger des Heils Padvindersbond and Leger des Heils Padvindstersbond (Salvation Army Boy Scouts Federation and Salvation Army Girl Scouts Federation) were based on the emblems of British Salvation Army Scouts and Guards. They show a lifebuoy with in the centre a Boy or Girl Scout and on the lifebuoy the name of the organisation. On banner is the motto "To Save and to Serve" written in Dutch. The symbols in the loops are: bible for caring for the soul, lamp for caring for others, eye for caring for the mind and gymnastics clubs for caring for the body.

=== Law ===
Het Nederlandsche Meisjesgilde / Het Nederlandse Padvindstersgilde 1916-1936

- Be much (help) at home
- Do not despise any kind of work
- Be honest and faithful
- Be helpful for human and animal
- Speak and think no harm
- Obey without complaining
- Wear disappointment with cheerfulness
- Care for your health

The NPG after 1936 and the NPV, KV, and NG had a law that was a direct translation / adaptation of the Scout Law.

== Dutch recipients of the Silver Wolf Award ==
- Jean Jacques Rambonnet - chairman N.P.V., Chief Scout
- A.E. Oosterlee - May 1938 - Headquarters commissioner N.P.V.

== Motto, Promise and Law ==
=== Scout Motto ===
The Scout Motto is not in much use after the merger. The Motto before the merger was for Boy Scouts Weest Paraat and for Girl Guides Wees Bereid.

=== Scout Promise ===
The Dutch Scout Promise is one of the few in the world where the reference to God is optional. It makes the Netherlands an exception to the WOSM guidelines. The Constitution of WOSM states that the Promise should include a reference to Duty to God, but six countries, including the Netherlands were granted the right in the 1920s by Lord Baden-Powell to additionally use an alternative promise without a reference to God. WOSM decided in 1932 that no new exceptions would be made and expressed the hope that the few remaining countries would stop using any promise lacking a reference to Duty to God.

Section	Dutch	English translation
Beavers	Ik beloof (met de hulp van God) mijn best te doen een goede bever te zijn. Samen te spelen en samen te delen.	I promise (with the help of God) to do my best to be a good beaver. To play together and share.
Cub Scout	Ik beloof (met de hulp van God) mijn best te doen een goede welp te zijn. Iedereen te helpen waar ik kan en mij te houden aan de welpenwet. Jullie kunnen op mij rekenen!	I promise (with the help of God) to do my best to be a good Cub Scout . To help everyone where I can and to live by the Cub Scout law. You can count on me!
Scouts	Ik beloof (met de hulp van God) mijn best te doen een goede scout te zijn. Iedereen te helpen waar ik kan en me te houden aan de Scoutingwet. Ik wil samen met anderen het goede zoeken en bevorderen. Jullie kunnen op me rekenen.	I promise (with the help of God) to do my best to be a good Scout. To help everyone where I can and to live by the Scout law. I want to work with others to search for and encourage the good. You can count on me.
Explorers	Ik beloof (met de hulp van God) mijn best te doen een goede explorer te zijn. Iedereen te helpen waar ik kan en me te houden aan de Scoutingwet. Ik wil samen met anderen het goede zoeken en bevorderen. Ik wil de kansen die ik krijg benutten, door zo goed mogelijk om te gaan met de middelen die mij ter beschikking staan. Jullie kunnen op mij rekenen.	I promise (with the help of God) to do my best to be a good explorer. To help everyone where I can and to live by the Scout law. I want to work with others to search for and encourage the good. I want to seize the opportunities that I get by as best as possible to deal with the resources available to me. You can count on me.
Roverscouts	Ik beloof (met de hulp van God) mijn best te doen een goede roverscout te zijn. Iedereen te helpen waar ik kan en me te houden aan de Scoutingwet. Ik wil samen met anderen het goede zoeken en bevorderen. Ik wil de kansen die ik krijg benutten, door zo goed mogelijk om te gaan met de middelen die mij ter beschikking staan. Ik wil ontdekken op welke manier ik een bijdrage kan leveren aan de samenleving, zowel binnen als buiten Scouting. Jullie kunnen op mij rekenen.	I promise (with the help of God) to do my best to be a good Rover. To help everyone where I can and to live by the Scout law. I want to work with others to search for and encourage the good. I want to seize the opportunities that I get by as best as possible to deal with the resources available to me. I want to discover how I can make a contribution to society, both within and outside of Scouting. You can count on me.
Leaders	Ik beloof (met de hulp van God) mijn best te doen goede leiding te zijn. Iedereen te helpen waar ik kan en me te houden aan de Scoutingwet. Ik wil jullie helpen goede scouts te zijn en jullie stimuleren in je ontwikkeling. Ik wil dit samen met de andere leiding doen. Jullie kunnen op mij rekenen.	I promise (with the help of God) to do my best to be a good leader. To help everyone where I can and to live by the Scout law. I will help you to be good Scouts and encourage you in your development. I want to do this together with the other leaders. You can count on me.
Plusscouts and other adult non leaders	Ik beloof (met de hulp van God) mijn best te doen in mijn rol een goede bijdrage te leveren aan Scouting. Iedereen te helpen waar ik kan en me te houden aan de Scoutingwet. Ik doe mijn best een bijdrage te leveren aan de samenleving, zowel binnen als buiten Scouting. Jullie kunnen op mij rekenen.	I promise (with the help of God) to do my best in my role to make a good contribution to Scouting. To help everyone where I can and to live by the Scout law. I do my best to make a contribution to society, both within and outside of Scouting. You can count on me.

=== Scout Law ===
All Dutch Scouts pledge faith to the Scout law in their Scout Promise.

Section	Dutch	English translation
Beavers	Ik ben een bever. Wat bevers doen, doen we samen.	I'm a beaver. What beavers do, we do together.
Cub Scouts	Een welp speelt samen met anderen in de jungle. Een welp is eerlijk, vriendelijk en zet door. Een welp zorgt goed voor de natuur.	A Cub plays with others in the Jungle. A Cub is honest, kind and perseveres. A Cub takes good care of nature.
Scouts	Een scout trekt er samen met anderen op uit om de wereld te ontdekken en deze meer leefbaar te maken. Een scout is eerlijk, vriendelijk en zet door. Een scout is trouw, waardebewust en zorgt goed voor de natuur. Een scout is behulpzaam en respecteert zichzelf en anderen.	A Scout ventures out into the world together with others to explore it and to make it a better place to live in. A Scout is honest, kind and perseveres. A Scout is loyal, value conscious and takes good care of nature. A Scout is helpful and respects themselves and others.

== Programme ==
Scouting Nederland is open for everyone irrespective of belief, race, skin colour, handicap, political context, sexual preference, or age. Scouting Nederland is co-educational and open, but single sex Scout Groups and Scout Groups with a religion are allowed.

In the Netherlands, most Scout groups are regular Scouts, but special programmes have been developed also for Sea Scouts and Air Scouts. Apart from the standard age groups, Scouting in the Netherlands has a separate division for handicapped members, called the Blauwe Vogels (BV, (Blue Birds) or Bijzondere Eisen (BE, Special Needs)).

The Crown Scout rank was the highest a Boy Scout could achieve in the Netherlands, until the mid-1970s.

=== Regular Scouts ===
The regular Dutch Scouting programme is divided into several age groups, although some age groups partly overlap and there are multiple programmes for some age groups.

The age group for ages 5 to 7 is called Bevers (Beavers).

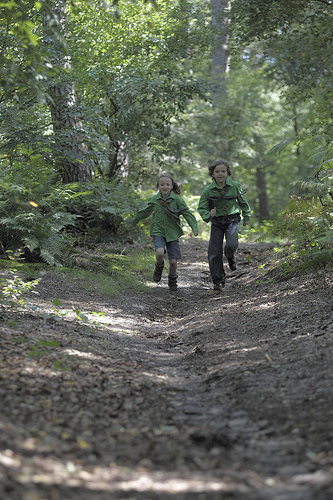
Welpen of Scouting Nederland

For ages between 7 and 11 the programme is called Welpen (Cubs). Until 2010 there were also Kabouters (Brownies), mostly for girls and Esta's for co-educational groups. These programmes and the "Dolfijnen" are being replaced by a redesigned Welpen programme with a second main character, the girl Shanti, and more water animals.

The age group 11 to 15 is called Scouts, but often the old, now unofficial, names Verkenners (Boy Scouts), Padvindsters or Gidsen (Girl Scout/Guide) are used.

The age group for ages 15 to 18 is called Explorers, but often the old, now unofficial, names Rowans for boys and Sherpa's for girls are used.

The age group for ages 18 to 21 is called "Roverscouts", before 2010 "Jongerentak", but more often the name "stam" (crew) is used or the old, now unofficial, name Pivo's" (Pionier(st)er/Voortrekker Ranger/Rover)

The age group above 21 is called Plusscouts.

=== Sea Scouts ===
Sail emblem Lelievlet

In the Netherlands there are about 300 Sea Scout Groups. Approximately 32% of the Sea Scouts are girls. The total fleet of all Dutch Sea Scout groups consists of 54 guard ships, 120 tugboats and motorboats, 100 Lelieschouwen, 1,550 Lelievletten (iron sailboat for 6 persons) and 40 Juniorvletten (smaller size of the Lelievlet). Sea Scouting has its own sections for many age groups, but Cub Scout and Beaver Scout Sections can also be a part of the Group. Officially, there are specialized Sea Scout programs for 12 years and older.

Until 2010 there was a special water programme for age 8 to 11, Dolfijnen (Dolphins). This is being replaced by a redesigned Welpen programme with a second main character, the girl Shanti, and more water animals.

Members are called Water Scouts from 12 to 16 years or more often Zeeverkenners, a unit is referred to as Wacht (Watch). The adult leaders are called Schipper (Skipper) and Stuurman (Coxswain). A patrol is called bak, its leader Boots(man) and his/her assistant Kwartiermeester. Water Scouts (which number 5,400 in the Netherlands) use Juniorvletten or Lelievletten.

The (Matrozen ter) Wilde Vaart (sailors of the high seas in English) are the Sea Scouting version of Explorers, a unit is referred to as Afdeling Wilde Vaart uses Lelievletten or Lelieschouwen. The 1,400 members are aged between 16 and 18 years.

The approximately 2,000 Rover Scouts and Ranger Guides of the Dutch Sea Scouts are called Loodsen (Harbour pilots).

=== Air Scouts ===
Being not very common, there are only about 15 Air Scout groups in the Netherlands. At the Scouts age (10-15), they are called Luchtscouts or Luchtverkenners and Air Scout Explorers are called Astronauten (Astronauts).

=== Camping ===
The Northern Pinkster Camp (Dutch: Noordelijk Pinksterkamp or NPK) is a Scouting camp held on the military practice terrain Marnewaard in the province of Groningen. The camp is held every year at Pentecost. The camp is held for members of Scouting Nederland from the northern Netherlands provinces of Frisia, Groningen and Drenthe.

The Northern Pinkster Camp is the largest annual Scouting camp of the Netherlands. In 2007 when the camp was held there were almost 3500 participants.

== Uniform ==
The official uniform of all Scouts in the Netherlands consists of blue trousers, a shirt and a neckerchief that is different between Scout Groups. The shirt differs between the different age groups, the ages 5 to 8 can wear a red shirt, the ages 7 to 11 a light green shirt, the ages 10 to 15 a khaki shirt and the ages above 14 a dark red/violet ("brick") shirt. Apart from that, all Sea Scouts can wear a dark blue shirt and all Air Scouts can wear a gray shirt. Leaders wear the same colour as the youth members in their section. There are no official trousers, but it has been stated that the colour should be dark blue. However, this is only enforced on official representative occasions.

ages 5 to 8	ages 7 to 11	ages 10 to 15	ages above 14
Sea Scouts	Air Scouts

Between 2010 and 2018 there was an official light blue sweater and t-shirt as an alternative.

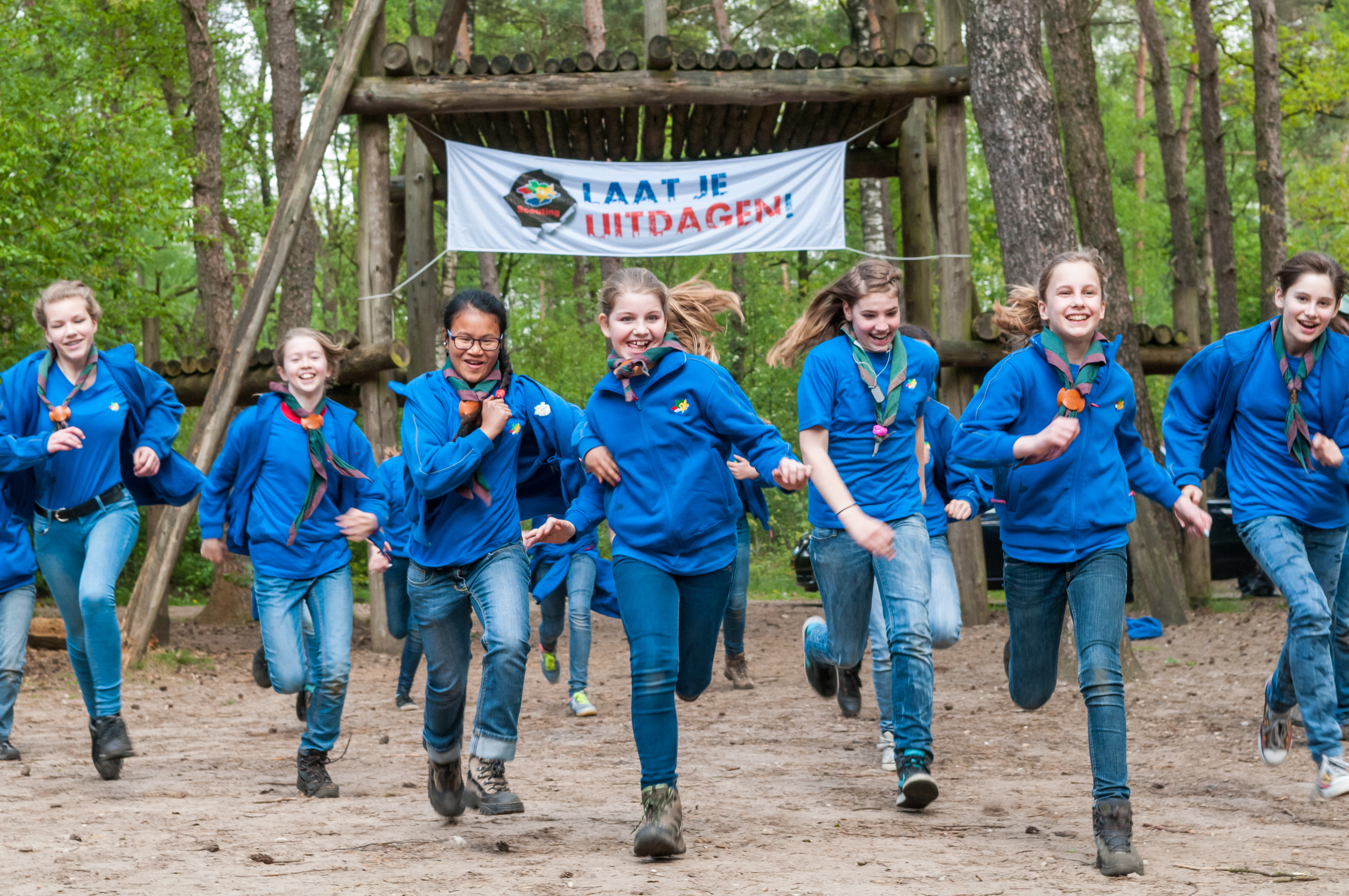
Alternative uniform 2010-2018

== International Scouting in the Netherlands ==
The Netherlands has hosted the international World Scout Jamboree twice. The fifth World Jamboree was held in Vogelenzang, Bloemendaal municipality, in 1937 (which was the last World Jamboree attended by Robert Baden-Powell himself) and the 18th World Jamboree in Dronten in 1995.

Besides the World Jamboree, the Netherlands has hosted the European Scout Jamboree in 1994, has organized the Dutch National Jamboree (which is open to foreigners) in 2000, 2004 and 2008 and every 4 years a National Jamboree for Sea Scouts Nawaka (national water camp). In addition, several smaller jamborettes and international camps are held regularly in the Netherlands, amongst which the Haarlem Jamborette, Marsna Jamborette and since 2001 the Nederweert International Camp for European Scouts (NICES).

From early 1954 until 1995, Troop 18 of the Transatlantic Council of the Boy Scouts of America was active at Camp New Amsterdam, near Soesterberg. Camp New Amsterdam was a U.S. Air Force base that was closed in 1995. There was also a troop at the NATO Headquarters in Brunssum. Today there are troops in The Hague, Schinnen and Amsterdam. American Girl Guides are served by USAGSO headquarters There are units of Girlguiding UK, The Scout Association, Scouts Canada and Külföldi Magyar Cserkészszövetség. Scouts et Guides de France is active in Amsterdam.

== See also ==
- Boy Scouts van Suriname
- Vereeniging Nederlandsch Indische Padvinders
- Gerakan Pramuka (Scouts of Indonesia)
- Het Arubaanse Padvindsters Gilde
- Padvindstersvereniging van de Nederlandse Antillen
- Scouting Antiano (Scouts of the Netherlands Antilles)
- Scouting Aruba
- Surinaamse Padvindsters Gilde, Gidsen Suriname

all of which share a common history with Scouting Nederland

- Gilwell Ada's Hoeve in Ommen
- Piet J. Kroonenberg, Dutch Scouting historian
- Jan van Hoof Member Dutch resistance WWII and Rover Scout
