= Dutch National Jamboree =

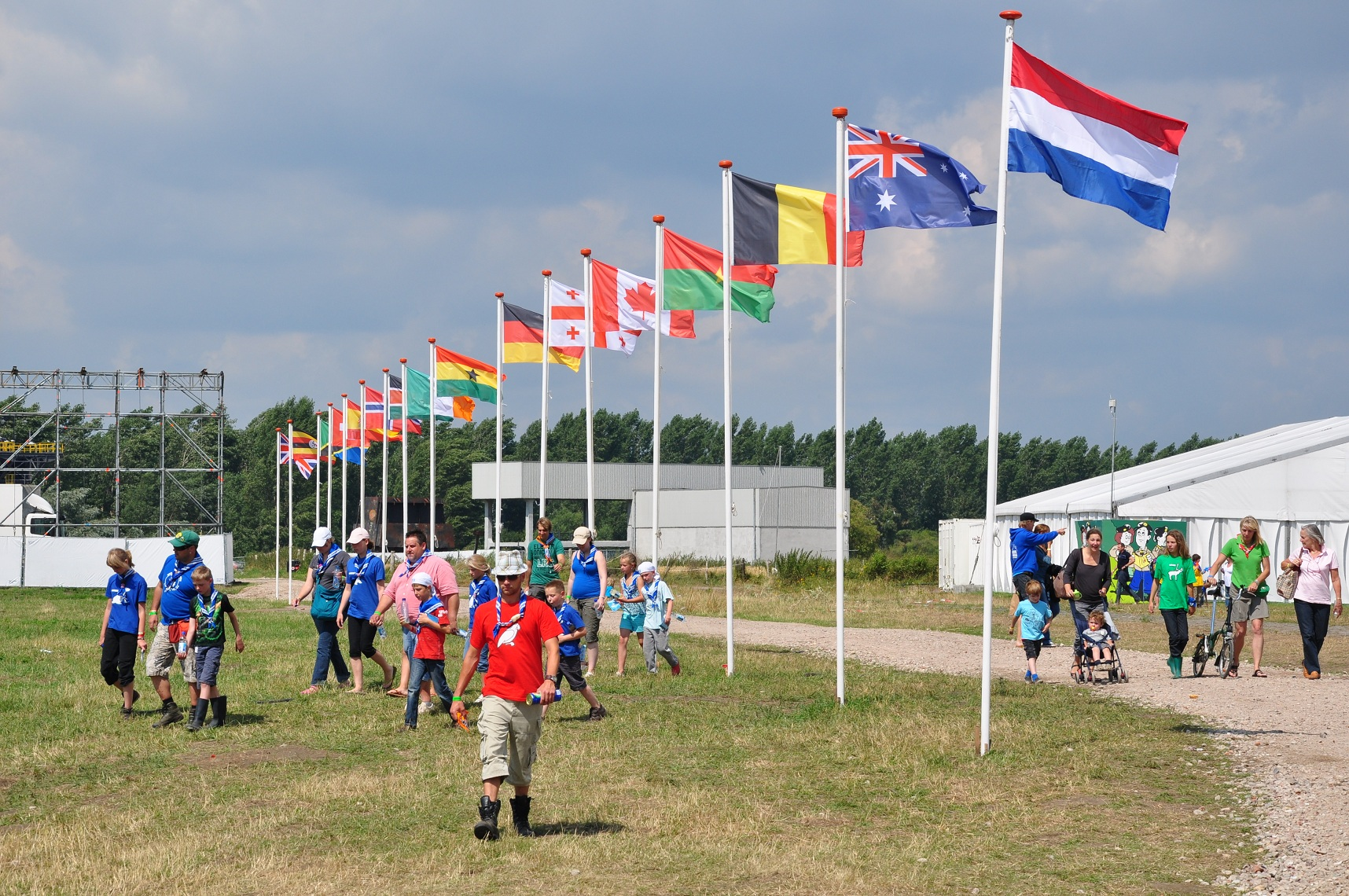
- Scouting, Netherlands, Jamboree 2010

The Dutch National Jamboree is a jamboree organized by Scouting Nederland for the Scouting age groups scouts (11–15 years old), and explorers (15–18 years old). It is organized every four years. Though it can be characterized as a national event, the Jamboree also welcomes foreign scouts.

== History ==
In 1985, a 75-year Dutch Scouting jubilee Jamboree was organised. This was not yet named National Jamboree, but can be characterized as one. The first Dutch National Jamboree took place in 2000 and was located in Dronten. Parts of the event area were also used as the location for the World Jamboree 1995 as well as the European Jamboree 1994, though the event is much smaller than its global and European equivalents. The second and third edition took place on Landgoed Velder in Boxtel and hosted around 4,000 participants. The last edition was a special Dutch scouting centenary edition. Though a 2012 edition was prepared, it was cancelled due to lack of subscribers.

== Activities ==
The Nationale Jamboree's program contained a lot of activities, as: hiking, canoeing, make torches, climbing, music, theater, international buffet, swopping, open stage, mountainbiking, friendship award, Scout FM, raft building, film night and a party.

== Overview ==
Number	Year	Number of nationalities	Number of participants	Location	Theme
–	1985		7.500	Apeldoorn	JubJam Scouting 75 jaar
1	2000	30	4.000	Dronten	Absolutely Anders
2	2004	33	4.300	Boxtel	More 2 explore
3	2008	31	3.800	Boxtel	My future my fantasy
–	2010	?	12.600	Roermond	JubJam Scouting 100 jaar
4	2012	–	–	–	Cancelled
5	2020	?	?	International Scout and Guide Center Scouting Estate Zeewolde	?

== See also ==
- Jamboree
