= Nawaka Scout Jamboree =

National Jamboree for Sea Scouts in The Netherlands

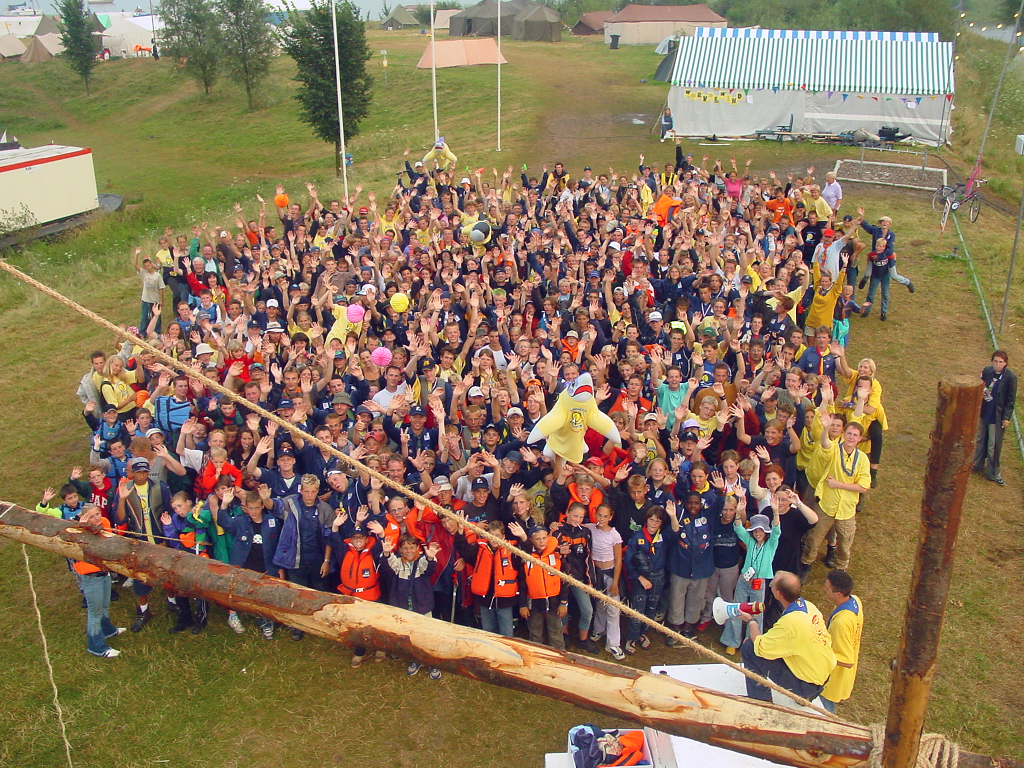
Nawaka 2002

Nawaka (national water camp) is a National Jamboree for Sea Scouts in The Netherlands. It is organised every four years by Scouting Nederland. Around 5000 scouts, approximately 100 coming outside of the Netherlands, in the age of 7 to 21 years join this event bringing together about 1000 ships and sailboats.

== History ==
Year	City	Name	Theme	Notes
1949	Rotterdam (kruiteiland)	Nationaal Zeeverkenners Kamp (national Sea Scouts camp)		Try-out for 1950.
1950	Terhorne	Nationaal Zeeverkenners Kamp	40 years Scouting	
1954	Nieuwkoop	Nationaal Zeeverkenners Kamp		
1961	Nieuwkoop	Nationaal Waterkamp (national water camp)		
1965	Nieuwkoop	Nationaal Waterkamp		
1970	Vinkeveen	Nawaka		6th national watercamp. The name 'Nawaka' is introduced.
1976	Vinkeveen	Nawaka		Postponed for two years as a result of the 1973 oil crisis.
1977	Enkhuizen	Internationaal Loodsenkamp (international "Sea Rover Scouts" camp)		Not an official water camp.
1979	Hellevoetsluis	Internationaal Loodsenkamp		Not an official water camp.
1980	Vinkeveen	Nawaka	Buitengewoon, gewoon buiten	A lot of rain.
1985	Vinkeveen	Nawaka	Scouting 75 jaar in Nederland	75 year anniversary of Scouting Nederland. A lot of rain.
1989	Roermond	Nawaka	Verrassend Avontuurlijk	Twice the size compared to the 1985 edition.
1992	Roermond	Nawaka	Zeilend Europa in	
1997	Roermond	Nawaka	Water leeft	
2002	Roermond	Nawaka	Over de kim	
2006	Giesbeek/Zevenaar	Nawaka	Voortvarend/Atlantis	
2010	Roermond	JubJam100	100 year Scouting in the Netherlands	
2014	Roermond	Nawaka	Waterproof!	
2018	Zeewolde	Nawaka	Ondersteboven	
2022	Zeewolde	Nawaka	Wonder schoon	

== JubJam100 ==
In 2010 the JubJam100 (Jubilee Jamboree 100) was held from 26 July to 4 August 2010 on the Nawaka-campsite as a camp for "Land", Sea and Air Scouts.
