= The National Organisation for Scouts and Guides =

National Scouting and Guiding organization of Oman

Sultanate of Oman National Organisation for Scouts and Guides الهيئة العامة للكشافة والمرشدات
- Country: Oman
- Founded: 1975
- Membership: 19,000
- Affiliation: World Association of Girl Guides and Girl Scouts, World Organization of the Scout Movement
- Website http://www.omanscouts.gov.om

The National Organisation for Scouts and Guides (Arabic: الهيئة القومية للكشافة والمرشدات) is the national Scouting and Guiding organization of Oman. It was founded in 1975, and became a member of the World Organization of the Scout Movement in 1977 and of the World Association of Girl Guides and Girl Scouts in 1996. The coeducational National Organisation for Scouts and Guides has about 19,000 members (8,892 Scouts and 9,965 Guides) as of 2010.

Traditional Scouting program is adapted to meet national needs. Service projects include filling in swamps in villages and insect control, planting trees and fighting fires. Scouts also help in guiding pilgrims in Mecca.

There are also various Rainbow, Brownie and Guide packs as well as a recently opened senior section.

The Scout Motto is "Kun Musta'idan" or كن مستعداً, translating as "Be Prepared" in Arabic. The noun for a single Scout is Kashaf or كشاف in Arabic. The membership badge of the National Organization for Scouts and Guides incorporates the coat of arms of Oman, and both the trefoil representing the girls and the fleur-de-lis representing the boys.

== International Scout units in Oman ==
In addition, there is a British Scout Group (British Scouting Overseas) meeting at both the British School Muscat and at the American British Academy which is linked to the British Scout Association (The Scout Association). An overseas branch of the Sri Lanka Girl Guides Association operates at the Sri Lankan School in Muscat, Oman.

The high number of Indian schools in the Sultanate have their own scouts and guides program affiliated to The Bharat Scouts and Guides, India. Camps are organised yearly by the schools (usually sending members and faculty to other schools for a 3 day and 2 nights camp). Scouting and Guiding is compulsory for all school children at Indian Schools and lasts for no more than 3 years (usually class 6 through 8).
