= Scouting Antiano =

- The Scout Association of Curacao
- Headquarters: Arowakenweg 41 A, Willemstad, Curaçao
- Country: Curacao
- Founded: 1930/1997
- Membership: 1,600
- Chief Executive: Regis Mercera
- Website https://www.scoutingantiano.org

Scouting Antiano (Papiamento: Antillean Scouting) is the national Scouting organization of the former Netherlands Antilles. It serves 1,600 members in 25 Scout groups, 21 Scout groups in Curaçao, two in Sint Maarten, two in Bonaire, none in Saba and Sint Eustatius. Since 2016, Scouting Antiano has been a full member World Organization of the Scout Movement. Until then, it was an associate member of the Interamerican Region of the World Organization of the Scout Movement.

== History ==
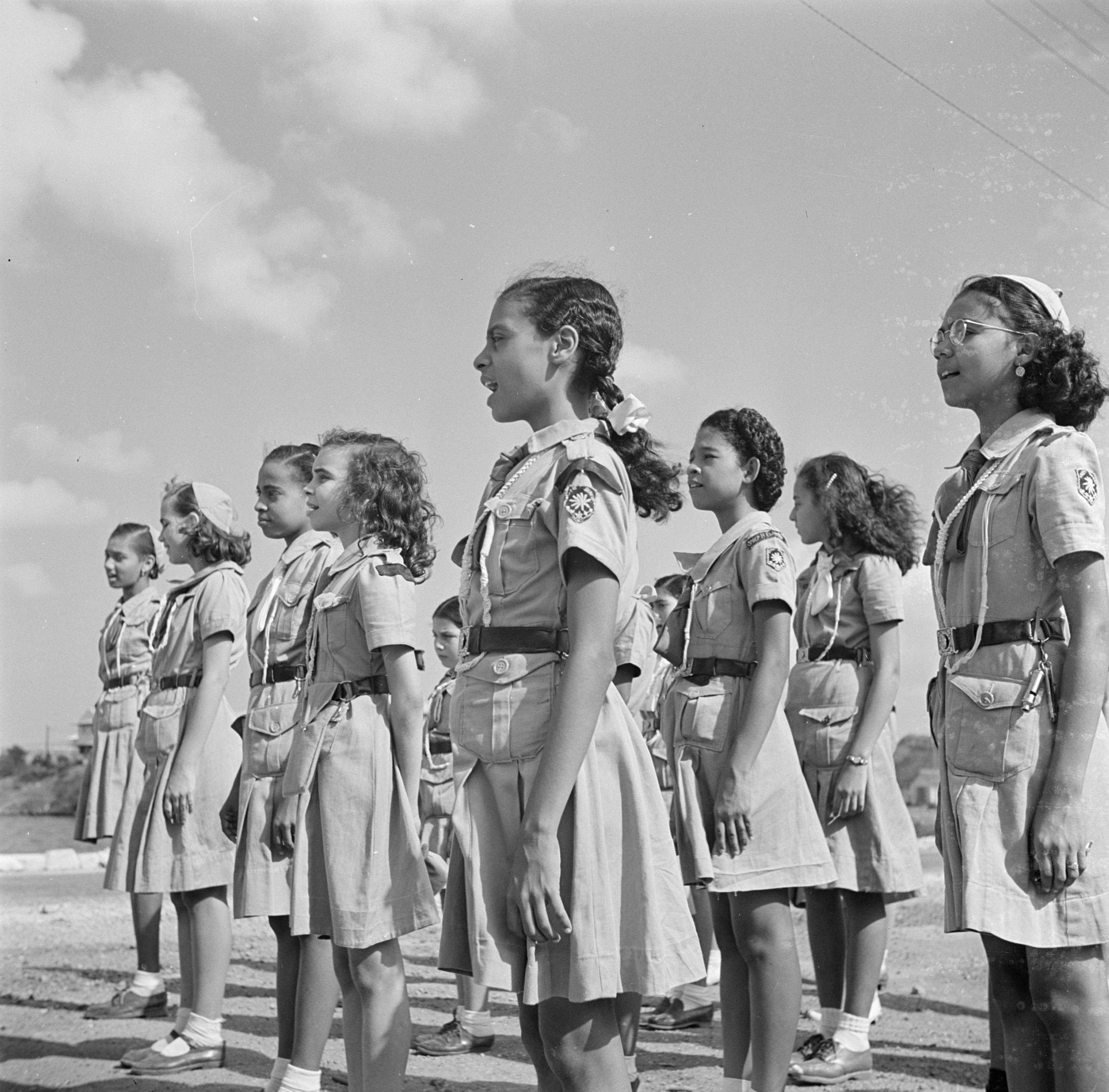
Scouts of Curaçao in 1947

In 1997, two Scout associations, Antilliaanse Padvinders Vereniging (APV, Antillean Scout Association), and the Katholieke Verkenners Nederlandse Antillen (KVNA, the Catholic Scouts of the Netherlands Antilles) merged. On April 15, 2000, Aruba got its own organisation, Scouting Aruba. Scouting Antiano share their headquarters with the "Padvindstersvereniging van de Nederlandse Antillen" and other Netherlands Antillean youth organisations.

== Structure ==
Scouting Antiano primarily follows the Dutch system of Scouting.

The Scout Motto is Ser Prepara, Be Prepared in Papiamento, and Wees Paraat in Dutch.

On 27 February 2016, the World Scout Committee recognized Scouting Antiano as the National Scout Organization of Curaçao and conferred it with Full WOSM Membership with voting rights. The membership certificate was presented to the organisation in the 41st World Scout Conference, which was conducted in Baku of Azerbaijan in 2017.

== See also ==
- Scouting in Guadeloupe et Saint Martin (French Scouting on the divided island of Sint Maarten)
- Padvindstersvereniging van de Nederlandse Antillen (Girl Scouts)
