= The Scout Association of Belize =

- Location: Belize City Center, Power station America Boulevard, Belize City
- Country: Belize
- Founded: 1987
- Founder: The Scout Association (of the United Kingdom)
- Membership: 3,041
- Website www.scoutsbelize.org

The Scout Association of Belize, a national Scouting organization in Belize was formed in 1987 as a successor to The Scout Association of the United Kingdom's Belize branch. The association became a member of the World Organization of the Scout Movement in 1987. The coeducational Scout Association of Belize claimed (an unaudited) 183 members as of 2021, with some 27 Scout groups located in six districts.

== History ==
For the history of the Scout Movement in Belize, generally and as distinct from The Scout Association of Belize, see Scouting in Belize. There is record of scouts in Belize as early as 1910.

The Boy Scouts Association of the United Kingdom formed a branch in British Honduras in 1917 with a census of 8 Scouters, 113 Scouts, and 59 Cubs, a total membership of 180. The branch flourished for about three to four years, then became defunct.

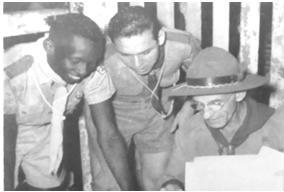
Brother Jacoby, SJ, major figure in the Boy Scout movement in Belize

Scouting was revived again in 1931 in the Belize City area, by Brother John Mark Jacoby, SJ, MBE, Professor of Mathematics at St. John's College. Hundreds of boys, including many leading citizens, passed through the hands of 'Bra Jake', as he was affectionately known (pictured at left). For many years, Scouting revolved around activities held at the Holy Redeemer Scout room (the home of troops 1, 2 and 3) and at an annual summer camp at San Pedro, Ambergris Caye. In 1936 Scouting was introduced to the districts beginning with the Stann Creek District and eventually spreading to all the others. Since that time there has always been Scout activity in the country. The level of this activity has varied considerably over the years, depending largely on the extent of the Association's ability to attract and maintain committed voluntary leadership.

In the late 1950s the Association acquired from the government 100 acres (0.40 km^{2}) of land in the Burrell Boom area. Later named Camp Oakley, this site has been the venue for many national camps, training seminars and other Scout programs. In 1971, with the help of a grant from the Baron Bliss Trust, a concrete building was erected at the camp.

Scouts from Belize have taken part in many international camps in the Caribbean, Mexico, Central America and the United States. In 1979, the Association embarked on a revitalization program which continues today.

The Scout Association of Belize was constituted as an autonomous association in 1987 and succeeded The Scout Association Belize Branch. The association exists by virtue of the Scout Association of Belize Act, 1987 (assented to on January 25, 1988). On 15 December 1987, The Scout Association of Belize became a member organization of the World Organization of the Scout Movement (WOSM) and joined its InterAmerican Conference on 18 September 1988.

Hilberto B. Riverol has served as the National Executive of the Scout Association of Belize. Programmes introduced during this period include Scouting in Schools, which was supported by the Belize Ministry of Education.

== Awards and recognitions ==
The Highest Rank or Medal for a Belize Scout to achieve is the Queen's Scout Award. This achievement recognizes the hard work, dedication, sacrifice, knowledge and understanding of the Scouting ideals and principles. The award has had few recipients over the years making the circle of awardees only seven so far in its 99-year history: Marlon McNab (1st Holy Redeemer Scout Unit), Khendis Ellis (1st. Orange Walk Scout Group), Edguin Castellanos, (1st Orange Walk Scout Group) Victoria Burgos, Nicholas Ruiz, Sean Usey, Lisette Ordonez (9th Belize St. Ignatius Scout Group). Victoria Burgos was the first female Scout in Belize to receive this highest award. In 2011 Fernando Oliva from the (9th Belize St. Ignatius Scout Group) is recorded as the last recipient of the Queen's Scout Award.

The highest rank or medal for a Belize Scout Leader is the Silver Wolf. Those that have received the award include, Sir Colville Young GCMG, Governor General of Belize - Patron of Belize Scouts, Hilberto B. Riverol - National Scout Executive, Martha Sosa - Executive Secretary for The Scout Association, Dr. Erasmo Franklin - Past Chief Scout.

The membership badge of The Scout Association of Belize incorporates the coat of arms of Belize and the color scheme of the flag of Belize.

== See also ==
- The Girl Guides Association of Belize
