= Vereeniging Nederlandsch Indische Padvinders =

National Scouting organisation of the Dutch East Indies

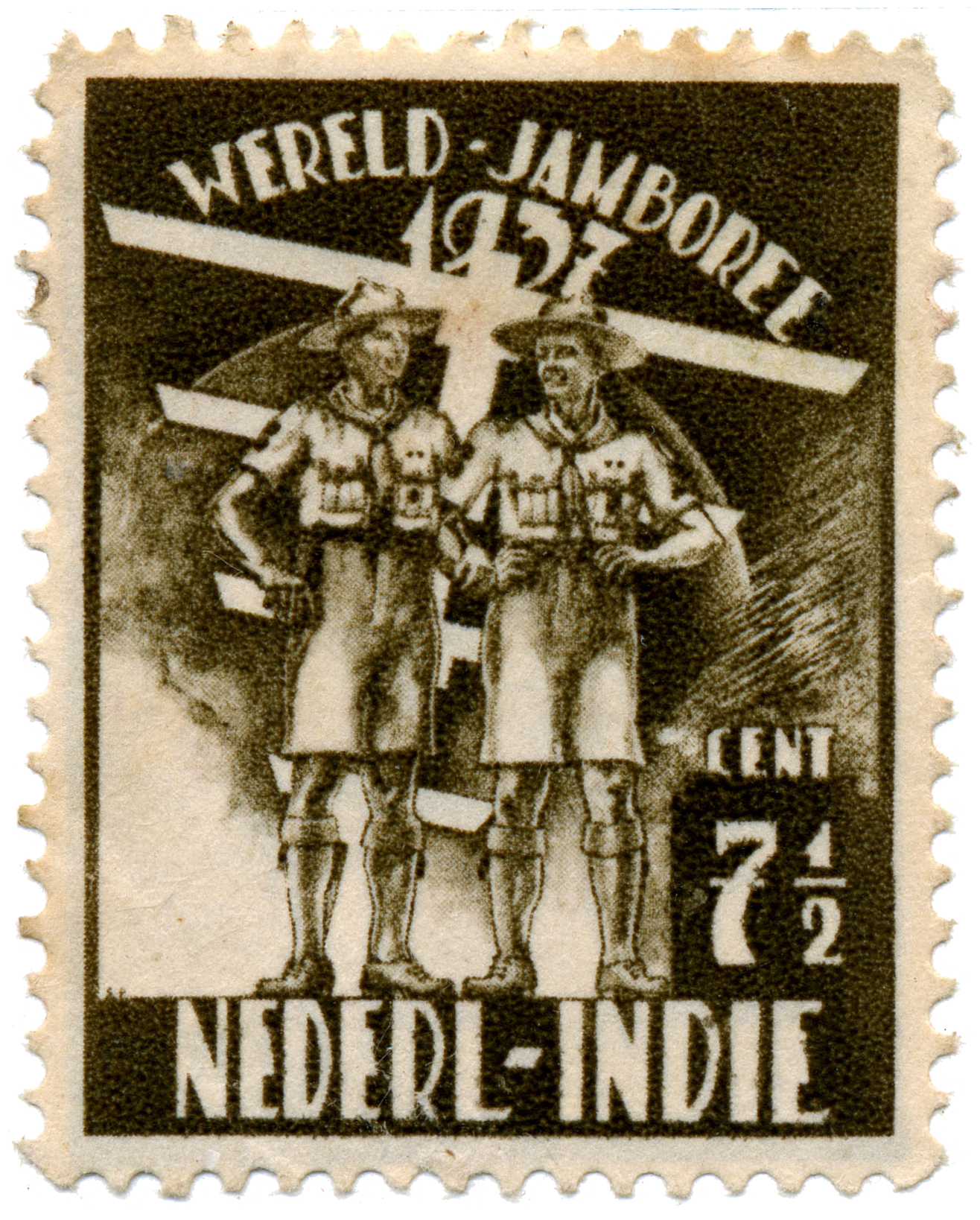
- Netherlands Indies stamp from 1937
- Location: Papandajanlaan 75 Bandung
- Country: Dutch East Indies
- Governing body: De Nederlandsche Padvinders, Het Nederlands Padvindstersgilde

Vereeniging Nederlandsch Indische Padvinders (NIPV) (English: Association of Dutch Indies Pathfinders) was the national Scouting organization in the Dutch East Indies (now Indonesia). This was founded in 1916 and had a boys and girls branch.

Boy Scouts from the Netherlands Indies at the World Scout Jamboree in the Netherlands (1937)

Scouting came to Indonesia in 1912, as branch of the Nederlandsche Padvinders Organisatie (NPO, Netherlands Pathfinder Organisation), the first Dutch Scouting organization. The NPO was open to both boys and girls. In 1916 in the Netherlands the "Nederlandsche Padvinders Organisatie" and the "Nederlandsche Padvinders Bond" (NPB) merged to form "De Nederlandsche Padvinders" (NPV). The NPV was boys only. The Dutch East Indies branch was renamed as the Vereeniging Nederlandsch Indische Padvinders (NIPV, Association of Dutch Indies Pathfinders), but stayed open for boys and girls.

As the Dutch East Indies, Indonesia had been a branch of the Netherlands Scout Association, yet Scouting was very popular, and had achieved great numbers and standards.

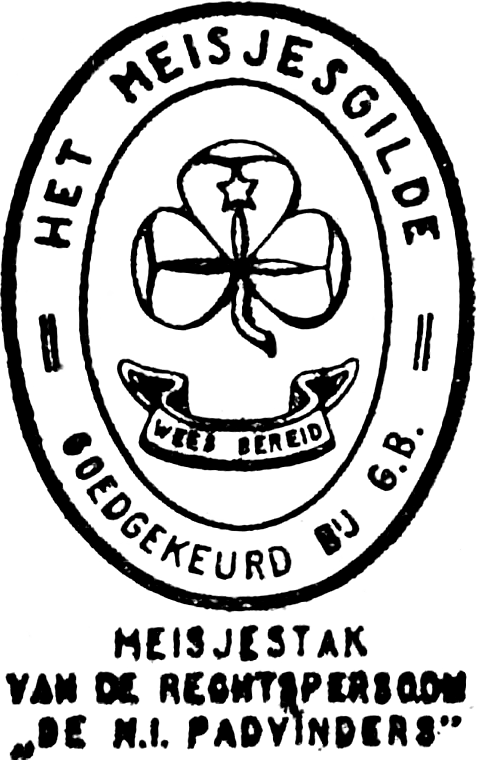
Logo Meisjesgilde NIPV, Girl Scouts

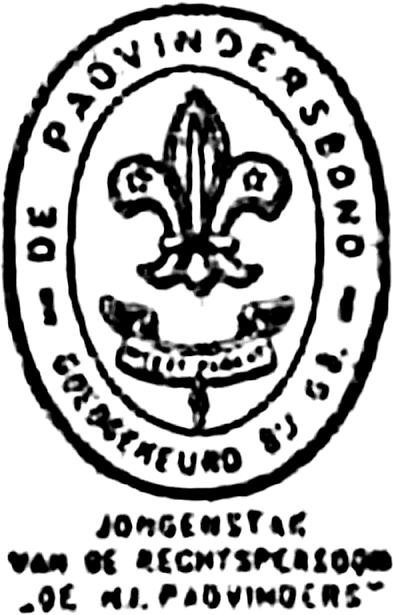
Logo Padvindersbond NIPV, Boy Scouts

== Organisation ==
The NIPV consisted of two parts, the "Padvindersbond" (Scouts' Union) for the boys and the "Meisjesgilde" (Girls' Guild) for the girls. A number of organisations were affiliated to NIPV, in 1934:

- Pandu Indonesia, before 1930 "Jong Indonesische Padvinders-Organisatie" (JIPO, Young Indonesian Scout Organisation)
- The Chinese Scout Unions
  - Shiong Tih Hui
  - Chung Hsioh
  - Hua Chao
- Indo Europeesch Verbond (IEV, Indo-European Union)
- Stichting Jong Holland (Young Holland Foundation)
- Katholieke Padvindersbonden (KPB, Catholic Scout Unions)

== See also ==
- Gerakan Pramuka Indonesia, the modern scouting organization in Indonesia
- Catharina Helena Bolhuis-Schilstra, member who was a Camp Kareës resident
