= Scouting and Guiding in Samoa =

Scouting and Guiding in Samoa exists as separate organisations for Scouts and Guides

== Guiding ==
Guiding is provided by the Samoa Girl Guides Association.

== Scouting ==
For some years, Scouting was active in the Samoan Islands as an overseas branch of British Scouting, and then under Scouting New Zealand until at least January 1, 1962, when Samoa was released from New Zealand-administered United Nations trusteeship. Sosene Anesi, Senior is the Commissioner for the Samoa Scouts Association.

The National Scout Organization of Samoa is not yet a member of the World Organization of the Scout Movement.

== See also ==
- Scouting in American Samoa
