= Association Scoute du Togo =

National Scouting organization of Togo

Association Scoute du Togo (A.S.T.)
- Scout Association of Togo
- Headquarters: 368, Rue 226 Hédzranawoé, B.P: 10 014, Lomé, Togo
- Location: 57V3+G8 Lomé, Togo
- Country: Togo
- Founded: 1920
- Membership: 9,727
- Affiliation: World Organization of the Scout Movement

The Association Scoute du Togo (A.S.T.), the national Scouting organization of Togo, was founded in 1920, and became a member of the World Organization of the Scout Movement in 1977. The coeducational Association Scoute du Togo has 9,727 members as of 2011.

== Program ==
=== Activities ===
Work for peace is a major concern for this association and is fundamental to all its work. The national badge contains the dove of peace which symbolizes the emphasis of the association's work.

Community development is another major emphasis of the association. Scouts learn agriculture, cattle breeding, fish farming and other skills at regional Scout Centers. Each of the 27 regions have community development centers.

=== Sections ===
- Louveteaux/Cubs-ages 7 to 11
- Eclaireurs/Scouts-ages 12 to 17
- Eclaireurs Aînés (Eclaireurs Avancés)/Senior Scouts- ages 15 to 18
- Routiers/Rovers-ages 18 to 30

The Scout Motto is Toujours Prêt, Always Prepared in French.

== Emblem ==
The membership badge of the Association Scoute du Togo contains the dove of peace which symbolizes the emphasis of the association's work.

== See also ==
- Association des Guides du Togo
