= Vanuatu branch of The Scout Association =

Scouting association in Vanuatu

The Scout Association Vanuatu Branch
- Skots Blong Vanuatu
- Headquarters: Port Vila
- Country: Vanuatu
- Founded: 1999
- Founder: The Scout Association (of the United Kingdom)
- Membership: 200
- Affiliation: Branch of The Scout Association (of the United Kingdom)

The Scout Association Vanuatu Branch (Bislama: Skots Blong Vanuatu) is a branch of The Scout Association of the United Kingdom operating in the Republic of Vanuatu since 1999. The Scout Association Vanuatu Branch is an incorporated non-government organisation. As a branch of The Scout Association, the Vanuatu Branch is recognised by but not an independent member of the World Organization of the Scout Movement. Currently there are four active Scout groups in Vanuatu, one in Santo and three in Port Vila, with over 200 youth participants.

== International Involvement ==
The Vanuatu Branch is active in the Asia-Pacific Region Scouting activities. Approaching two decades ago, in December 1998, two Vanuatu Scouts participated in the 19th World Jamboree in Chile. Over twelve years ago, in 2005, it was reported that some Vanuatu Scouts were to attend the Australian Scout Jamboree in 2007. The Vanuatu Branch receives administrative support from The Scout Association and aid from Scouts Australia.

== History ==
Scouting in Vanuatu (then the New Hebrides) started in 1956. Before the independence of Vanuatu in 1980, there were two Scout organisations, one The New Hebrides Branch of The Scout Association of the United Kingdom and the other attached to Scouts de France and both the French colonial administration and the British colonial administration supported Scouting organisations.

After the independence of Vanuatu, the two Vanuatu Scout organisations struggled to sustain themselves and integrate into a single national organisation and Scouting in Vanuatu collapsed. By 1999, there was only one active Scout group. The Scout Association of Australia New South Wales Branch assisted the Vanuatu Branch for twenty years. In 1999, Norvan Vogt, a Rover from Queanbeyan Rovers, was sent to Vanuatu under the Australian Government sponsored Australian Youth Ambassadors for Development program. Vogt registered the Vanuatu Branch, established a national HQ and ran a series of training activities as part of his Baden-Powell Award. The two former Scout organisations merged in 1999. These changes proved to be the catalyst for a sustained period of growth of Scouting in Vanuatu.

== Motto and Emblem ==
The Scout Association Vanuatu Branch Scout Motto is Rerem in Bislama or Sois Prêt (Be Prepared) in French.

The Scout Association Vanuatu Branch membership badge features an outrigger canoe, a symbol in use since its adoption by The Boy Scouts Association New Hebrides Branch.

== See also ==
- Vanuatu Girl Guides Association
