= Boy Scouts van Suriname =

- Boy Scouts of Suriname
- Headquarters: Weidestraat 67-69
- Location: Paramaribo
- Country: Suriname
- Founded: 1972
- Founder: Jacob Rademaker
- Membership: 2,601
- Chief Scout: Dési Bouterse
- Affiliation: World Organization of the Scout Movement

Boy Scouts van Suriname is the national Scouting organization of Suriname. Scouting in Suriname officially started in 1924 and became a member of the World Organization of the Scout Movement (WOSM) in 1968. The coeducational association has 2,601 members (as of 2004).

== History ==
On September 12, 1910, the "Korps Surinamese Boy Scouts" was established in Thalia. In 1915 the name was "Surinaamsche Padvinders Organisatie". There was no more activity, after Scouting was blamed for the drowning of 16-year-old Boy Scout, Herman Sas Römer, on March 13, 1916 in the Dominékreek near Poelepantje. Scouting in Suriname officially restarted on July 29, 1924, when the Surinamese district of the Vereeniging de Nederlandsche Padvinders (NPV) was officially founded in the Thalia theatre in Paramaribo. On this occasion, 107 Boy Scouts, many Cub Scouts and some girls made their Scout Promise.

In 1938, the Dutch Scout movement was split after a decision of the Roman Catholic episcopate into the interreligious NPV and the Katholieke Verkenners (KV). Scouting in Suriname had to follow this despite all protests, so the Katholieke Verkenners Suriname (KVS) were founded out of the Catholic members of the groups. The logo of the KVS was the same as the KV, a Fleur-de-lis for Boy Scouts, on a cross potent for Catholic Scouts.

The red Jerusalem Cross with the fleur-de-lis was the symbol of the Katholieke Verkenners Suriname

During World War II, the Surinamese Scouts had to stand alone, since Scouting was banned in the German-occupied Netherlands. So, after the war, the Suriname district of NPV decided to found its own, nearly independent association, the Surinaamse Padvinders Vereniging (SPV), which was incorporated in 1964. SPV and KVS worked close together and received recognition by WOSM in 1968, seven years before the independence of Suriname. After four years of cooperation both association merged and formed the Boy Scouts van Suriname on April 23, 1972. The first Chief Scout was Johan Ferrier.

In 1974, the new association hosted the 5th Caribbean Jamboree.

== Program ==
The association is divided in three age-groups:

- Cub Scouts (ages 7 to 12)
- Scouts (ages 12 to 18)
- Rover Scouts (ages 18 to 24)

The Scout Motto is Weest Paraat, Be Prepared in Dutch, and Weest Pareet in Sranan Tongo.

== See also ==
- Surinaamse Padvindsters Raad
