= Scouting and Guiding in Morocco =

Scouting and Guiding associations in Morocco

The Scout and Guide movement in Morocco is served primarily by the Fédération Nationale du Scoutisme Marocain, member of both the World Organization of the Scout Movement and World Association of Girl Guides and Girl Scouts

== Non-aligned Scout organizations ==
Morocco has a large non-aligned Scout movement; known are the following ten organizations:

- Association Scouts Arabe Sociale
- Association Scouts du Maroc
- Mouvement du Scoutisme marocain
- Organisation du Scout Populaire
- Organisation du Scoutisme marocain musulman
- Organisation Scout Atlas
- Organisation Scout National
- Organisation Scoutisme Mohamedia Marocaine
- Organisation Scouts sans frontières
- Scoutisme Unifié au Maroc

== International Scouting units in Morocco ==
- Boy Scouts of America, served by the Transatlantic Council in Rabat
- Scouts et Guides de France operates groups in Tunis and Rabat.
