= Scouting in the Federated States of Micronesia =

Scouting in Micronesia

Scouting in the Federated States of Micronesia is in a state of development and growth. Scouting has existed in the islands since at least the 1970s, and may have been developed as early as the 1950s.

Like the other former Trust Territories of the Pacific, Boy Scouting in Micronesia is developing as part of the Aloha Council Pacific Basin District. The person responsible for Scouting is Mr. Berson Joseph, Youth Coordinator of the State of Pohnpei Social Affairs Office. Its Order of the Arrow lodge is Nā Mokupuni O Lawelawe Lodge #567.

For Girl Scouts, there are Girl Scouts of the USA Overseas on Chuuk, Kosrae, Pohnpei, and Yap, serviced by way of USAGSO headquarters in New York.
