= Padvindstersvereniging van de Nederlandse Antillen =

- Girl Guides Association of the Netherlands Antilles
- Headquarters: Arowakenweg 41 A, Willemstad, Curaçao
- Country: Netherlands Antilles
- Founded: May 30, 1930
- Membership: 461
- Voorzitter: Mevr. Kyra Romer
- Affiliation: World Association of Girl Guides and Girl Scouts
- Website http://pnagirls.tripod.com

The Padvindstersvereniging van de Nederlandse Antillen (Girl Guides Association of the Netherlands Antilles) is the national Guiding organization of the former Netherlands Antilles. It serves 461 members (as of 2003). Founded in 1930, the girls-only organization became an associate member of the World Association of Girl Guides and Girl Scouts in 1978 and full member in 1981.

It serves 461 members in 11 Guide groups, 10 Guide groups on Curaçao, 1 on Bonaire, none on Sint Maarten, Saba and Sint Eustatius.

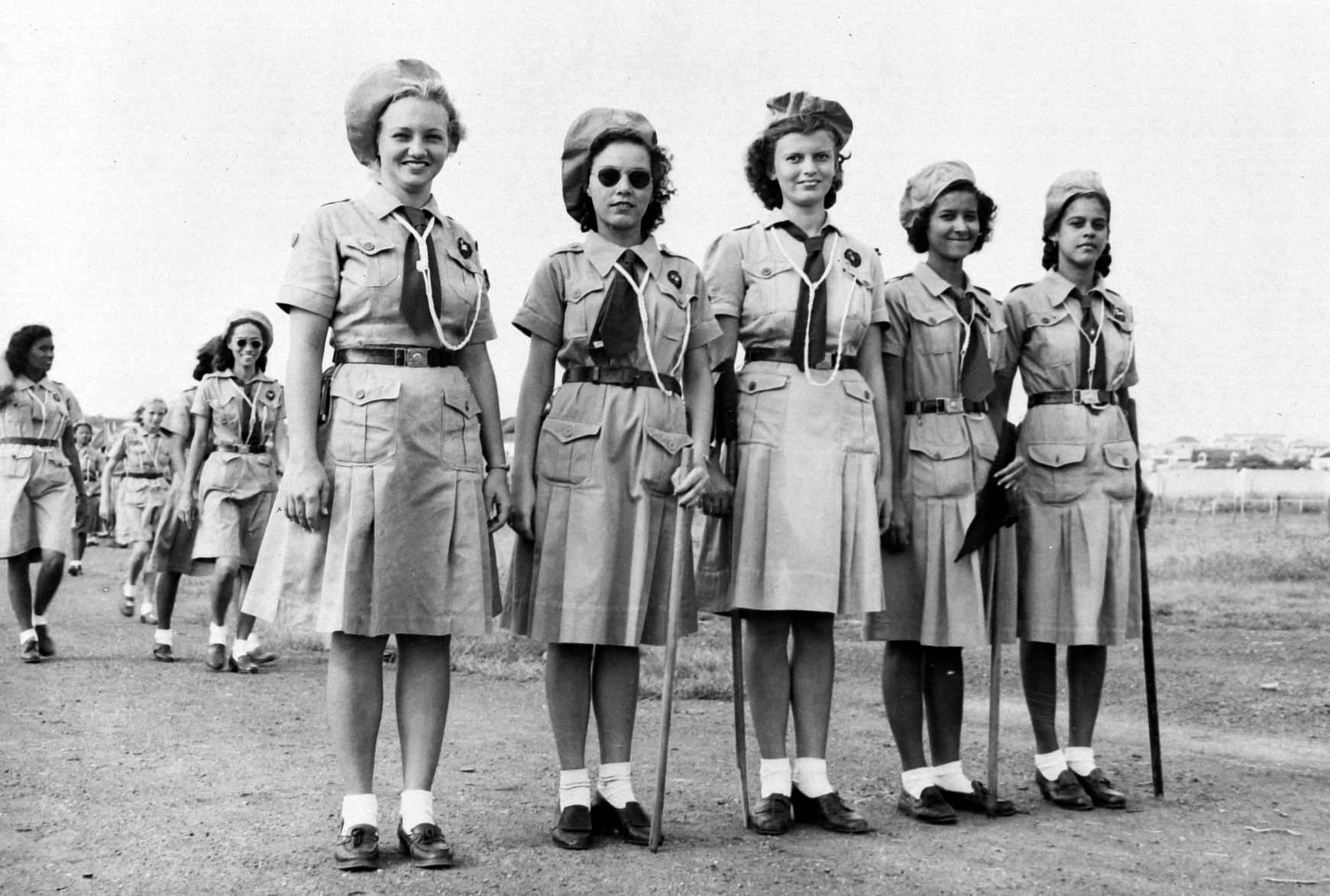
Girl Scouts in Curaçao, 1947

== Program and ideals ==
The association is divided in four sections according to age;

- Elvita - ages 4 to 7
- Kabouter - ages 8 to 10
- Guia Menor - ages 11 to 14
- Guia Mayor - ages 15 to 18

The Girl Scout Motto is Sea Prepara, Be Prepared in Papiamento, and Weest Paraat in Dutch.

The badge of the Padvindstersvereniging van de Nederlandse Antillen is based on the badge of the former Dutch Girl Scouts organisation, Het Nederlands Padvindsters Gilde. The badge consists of a ten-point star for the ten lines in the Girl Scouts law on a Trefoil for Girl Scouting/Guiding.

Padvindstersvereniging van de Nederlandse Antillen share their headquarters with Scouting Antiano and other former Netherlands Antillean youth organisations.

== See also ==
- Scouting in Guadeloupe et Saint Martin (French Scouting on the divided island of Sint Maarten)
- Scouting Antiano
