= Yemen Scouts and Guides Association =

National Scouting and Guiding organization of Yemen

- جمعية الكشافة والمرشدات اليمنية
- Country: Yemen
- Founded: 1987
- Membership: 20,000
- President: Hamoud Mohammad Abad
- Affiliation: World Association of Girl Guides and Girl Scouts, World Organization of the Scout Movement
- Website yemenscouts.org

The Yemen Scouts and Guides Association (Arabic: جمعية الكشافة والمرشدات اليمنية) is the national Scouting and Guiding organization of Yemen. Scouting in Yemen started in 1927. The Yemen Scouts and Guides Associations was established in 1987.

The Boy Scout branch serves 6,481 members (as of 2004) and is a member of the World Organization of the Scout Movement since 1980. The Girl Guide branch has 14,583 members (as of 2015) and became a member of the World Association of Girl Guides and Girl Scouts in 1990.

== History ==
Scouting existed in all parts of Yemen at various times, including British Scouts in Aden, and a separate historical organization first in the Mutawakkilite Kingdom of Yemen and then in the Federation of South Arabia.

The 17th Arab Regional Conference was held in Yemen in 1986.

The Yemen Scouts and Guides Associations was established through the merger of the Yemen Scout Association (founded in 1954) and the Yemen Republic Girl Guides Association (founded in 1962, later the People's Republic of Southern Yemen Guides Association) in 1987.

== Activities ==
Yemen Scouts participate in basic Scouting activities, and in addition, they are involved in reforestation, literacy campaigns, and service to hospitals. Scouts have planted thousands of trees in this arid country and have learned modern ways to identify and treat plant diseases with the goal of increasing agricultural production.

Scouts are involved in rural areas by showing the community how to make safe drinking water and water filters out of common materials.

Scouts have participated in helping during natural disasters.

== Motto ==
The Scout Motto is Kun Musta'idan or كن مستعداً, translating as Be Prepared in Arabic. The noun for a single Scout is Kashaf or كشاف in Arabic.

== Emblems ==
The old and new Scout emblems both incorporate elements of the emblem of Yemen. The new emblem shows more closely the Marib Dam.

emblem of the Mutawakkilite Kingdom of Yemen Scouts Association uses the flag of the Mutawakkilite Kingdom of Yemen (1918–1962)

emblem of the People's Republic of Southern Yemen Guides Association
