= Tuvalu Scout Association =

- Country: Tuvalu
- Founded: 1975
- Membership: 450
- Chief Scout: Sir Iakoba Italeli
- Chief Commissioner: Tonuu Taani
- National Secretary: Susana Taafaki
- Affiliation: The Scout Association

Scouting in Tuvalu was first introduced in 1914, while known as the Gilbert and Ellice Islands. Scouting operated as branch of the Scout Association (UK) in the early years. The Gilbert and Ellice Scout Association was founded in 1927, and joined the World Organization of the Scout Movement in 1933. The Gilbert and Ellice Islands were separated administratively in the 1970s to become the independent Commonwealth nations of Tuvalu and Kiribati, and their Scouting movements took different paths.

== Activities ==
The Tuvalu Scout Association was founded in 1975 again as a branch of the British Scout Association, but fell dormant in 1979. Scouting in Tuvalu was revived in 2004. The association had about 450 members in 2004.

== Girl Guides Association of Tuvalu ==
The Girl Guides Association of Tuvalu is a former member of the World Association of Girl Guides and Girl Scouts, but membership was withdrawn in 2005. Because the islands of Tuvalu have a small number of young people, Tuvaluan Scouts carry out activities in conjunction with the Girl Guides.
