= Scouting in American Samoa =

- Aloha Council American Samoa
- Website; Aloha Council site

Scouting in American Samoa is in a state of development and growth. Scouting has existed in the islands since 1928. They attended jamborees, campouts and even assisted in local rescue and recovery efforts.

== Background ==
Tui F.S. Chanel was the South Pacific District Commissioner for the Boy Scouts of America and an officer of Air New Zealand. In 1970, after Chanel's death, the Boy Scouts dedicated Camp Chanel near Tafuna Airport in his honor. During the 1960s, Chanel led a troop that produced the first Eagle Scout in American Samoa, Kilifi (Cliff) O'Brian, currently the Fire Chief on Tutuila.

For Boy Scouts of America, the Aloha Council has designated a full-time senior Scout District Executive for American Samoa, John A. Mills, in efforts to elevate the local Scouting program. For Girl Scouts, there are USA Girl Scouts Overseas in Pago Pago, served by USAGSO headquarters in New York City.

== See also ==
- Samoa Girl Guides Association
- Scouting in Samoa
