= Samoa Girl Guides Association =

The Samoa Girl Guides Association is the national Guiding organization of Samoa. It serves 186 members (as of 2003). Founded in 1952, the girls-only organization became an associate member of the World Association of Girl Guides and Girl Scouts in 1996. Its WAGGGS membership was cancelled in 2008.

In 1952 a Girl Guide meeting was convened by Sister Mary Patrick of Saint Mary's School on Upolu. The unit served for only four years, as the girls did not have time and there were not enough leaders. The unit was reformed when Saint Mary's pupils went to the newly established Saint Mary's College at Vaimoso, and later a Guide company was introduced. This group went on for some years, then also faded. In 1955 at the Anglican Chaplaincy (now All Saints Church at Leiifiifi, a New England schoolteacher began a Guide company, and then in 1957 a brownie pack, and in 1970 a ranger unit, which carried out tremendous community service, before it was closed nearly five years later. Many girls won scholarships and went overseas, leaving very few behind, who lost interest. In 1964, a Cadet company was established for several years, and young leaders of the various groups came from these cadets. This group closed when the program changed to a new one, but the Guides and Brownies groups continued. Since 1974, the Apia Protestant Church's Guides and Brownies have continued to develop. In September 1996, the association acquired the lease of a house at Matautu-tai in Apia, which now serves as national headquarters.

== See also ==
- Scouting in Samoa
- Scouting in American Samoa
