= Scouting and Guiding in New Caledonia =

Scouts de Nouvelle Caledonie
- Headquarters: Robinson, 64, rue des Saules, 98809 Mont-Dore

Scouting is active in New Caledonia. The Scouts et Guides de France is the largest Scout Association on the island. Scouts Vaillants is a smaller association. They are for children between 8 and 17 years old. In addition to typical scouting activities, participants can make traditional huts.

A scout troup was fomred in Nouméa in 1916. Scouts from New Caledonia participated in the 1998 World Jamboree in Chile, in the 2013 and 2016 Australian Jamborees, and in the New Zealand Jamboree in 2023.

A branch of marine scouting exists with the Notre-Dame de Lourdes group. This is the only overseas marine group in French scouting.

The Scout Motto is Sois Prêt (Be Prepared) or Toujours Prêt (Always Prepared) in French, depending on the organization.

== See also ==
- Scouting in France
