= Iraq Scout Association =

National Scouting organization of Iraq

- The restored Scout emblem incorporates a pattern from the Stele of Hammurabi and palm fronds set inside the star of Rub El Hizb (۞), a symbol of Islam, to which a majority of Iraqis profess.
- Arabic: جمعية الكشافة و المرشدين العراقية
- Country: Iraq
- Membership: 30,609

Iraq Scout Association is the national Scouting association in Iraq. Iraq was one of the first Arab nations to embrace the Scouting movement, launching its program in 1921, just two years after the League of Nations had created the country out of the old Ottoman Empire. Iraq was a member of the World Organization of the Scout Movement from 1922 to 1940, and again from 1956 to 1999 before being reintroduced as a member again in 2017.

== History ==
Prior to and during World War II, RAF Habbaniya maintained a Scout group for British and local boys.

In 1990, during the period when the Iraq Boy Scouts and Girl Guides Council (Arabic: جمعية الكشافة و المرشدين العراقية) was recognized by World Order of the Scouting Movement (WOSM), the Mesopotamian nation had 12,000 Scouts, however by 1999, Iraq had been expelled from the WOSM.

== Rebirth ==
In late 2004, Chip Beck, a former Navy commander had the idea to try and restart Scouting in Iraq after serving there. The Iraqi Scouts Initiative committee was led by Co-Chairmen Beck and Michael Bradle, an Eagle Scout.

In early 2008, a group of coalition military officers led by Navy chaplain Lieutenant Commander Andrew Wade sought to expand the Green Zone Council's model to the Iraqis living in and around the Victory Base Complex around Baghdad International Airport. Meeting with the Green Zone Council and their Iraqi counterparts, and spending several months building relationships with Iraqi civilian and military leaders on and around Victory Base, the group founded the Victory Base Council in April 2008 and began supporting troop meetings in June 2008. Following the "Green Zone" model, the VBC is a loosely organized fraternal support group that enables their Iraqi partners to establish and grow a vibrant Scouting organization to serve local Iraqi youth. During 2008 the VBC built important relationships with local schools and worked with local Iraqi military and civilians to create a camp and community center where the troop meetings are held. Continued growth of the camp facilities, and ongoing cross training of US and Iraqi Scout leaders are underway for 2009.

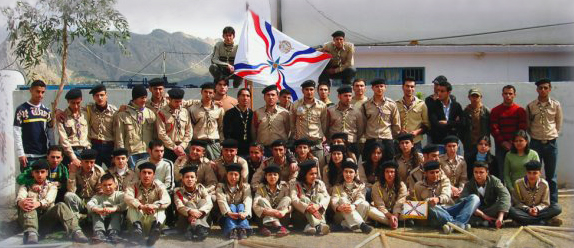
Assyrian Scouts in Iraq

Since the movement restarted in 2004, it has been taken over by Iraqis and is now run exclusively by them. Iraqi Scouts are involved in community service such as helping police with traffic control, giving first aid, cultivating cotton, planting trees and helping during natural disasters.

In February 2006, 18 Iraqi Guides attended a leadership seminar in Egypt organized by the World Association of Girl Guides and Girl Scouts. The association is currently listed as "working toward membership". In 2010 was founded the Turkmen Federation of Scouts (Türkmen Izcilik Federasyonu) based in Kirkuk.

The Scout Motto is Kun Musta'idan or كن مستعداً, translating as "Be Prepared" in Arabic. The noun for a single Scout is Kashaf or كشاف in Arabic.

== Emblems ==
The emblem of the Boy Scouts of Iraqi Kurdistan incorporates a lamassu, an Assyrian protective deity, often depicted as having a human's head, a body of an ox or a lion, and bird's wings.

The post-war Scout emblem, intermittently still in use, incorporates a palm tree and the flag of Iraq
