= Lelievlet =

Type of sailing boat

The Lelievlet is the most commonly used steel sailing and rowing boat of the Sea Scouts of Scouting Nederland, it is also used by many Sea Scouts in Flanders and the National Water Activities Centre (NWAC) of Scouting Ireland in Killaloe, Ireland. Its design is based upon the beenhakkervlet, a type of steel dinghy often used with cargo riverboats, and its name is derived from the international Scout logo, the Scout lily. 2026 fist three boats had bought The Lithuanian Scouting, Ukmergės sea scouts, skautų slėnis.

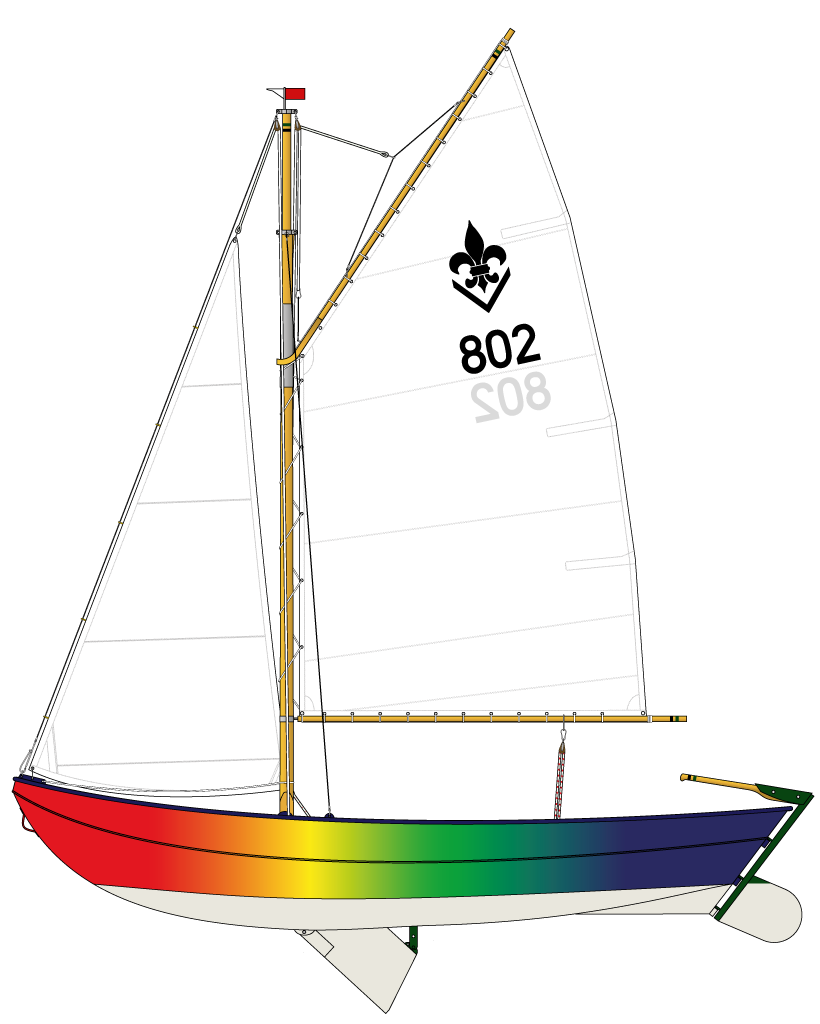
Lelievlet

Lelievlet logo

== History ==
Until the 1950s the Dutch Sea Scouts employed many different boats. Often these were a discarded lifeboat from the navy or other types of boats. These boats were almost always made out of wood, making the maintenance expensive in terms of time and cost. It was also difficult to source parts to enable repairs. This situation prompted a project to define a standard vessel. The standard boat also made the running of regatta’s easier as all the boats were of equal class. The vessel requirements were set as:

- Seating space for 6 persons.
- They had to be able to be sculled, rowed or sailed.

In 1955, the Dutch Sea Scouts looking for a boat to meet these requirements and they became interested in a steel rowing boat, designed by Teunis Beenhakker, Kinderdijk. He had created a design for a rowing and motorboating for inland waterway skippers. The groups saw something in that draft and Mr. A.L.J. Stockmann, skipper with Titus Brandsmagroep in Breda and Commissioner at the Katholieke Verkenners (Catholic Boy Scouts), adapted the design so it could be used as a sailboat. In 1956 Teunis Beenhakker built two hulls for trial. He made two almost equal hulls: one 4.60 m and the other 5.60 m. Both were built as sailing boats with 12.5 m2 sails. Ultimately, the 5.60 m boat was selected as most suitable.

The lelievlet was, as had been predicted, a great success. Until 2006 in the Netherlands there have been about 1600 lelievlet’s built. Lelievlet number '1' still exists and is still under the flag of the Titus Brandsma Group from Breda.

There are now also a large number of hulls by vmbo schools built under license, under the flag of the Botenbouwproject Vletten op de Maas (Vlets on the Meuse).

== Details and specifications ==
- Length: 5.60 m
- Width: 1.80 m
- Height: 6.50 m
- Avg. Weight: 650 kg
- Sail: 12.15 m²
