= Surinaamse Padvindsters Raad =

- Country: Suriname
- Founded: 1947
- Founder: Maria Jacoba Paulina Oostburg-Cop (Gidsen Suriname)
- Membership: 502
- Affiliation: World Association of Girl Guides and Girl Scouts

The Surinaamse Padvindsters Raad (Surinamese Girls Guides' Council) is the national Guiding organization of Suriname. It serves 502 members (as of 2003). The girls-only organization became an associate member of the World Association of Girl Guides and Girl Scouts in 1972.

The Surinaamse Padvindsters Raad is an umbrella federation consisting of two independent member organizations:

- Surinaamse Padvindsters Gilde, founded May 1947
- Gidsen Suriname, founded August 1948

The Girl Scout Motto is Weest Paraat, Be Prepared in Dutch.

== Emblems ==
Badge of Surinaamse Padvindsters Gilde

- The badge of the Surinaamse Padvindsters Gilde is based on the badge of the interreligious former Dutch Girl Scouts organisation, Het Nederlands Padvindsters Gilde. The badge consists of a ten-point star for the ten lines in the Girl Scouts law on a Trefoil for Girl Scouting/Guiding

Badge of Gidsen Suriname

- The badge of the Gidsen Suriname is based on the badge of the former Dutch Roman Catholic Girl Guides organisation, Nederlandse Gidsen. The badge consists of a Trefoil for Girl Scouting/Guiding on a Cross potent for Roman Catholic Scouting/Guiding.

== See also ==
- Boy Scouts van Suriname
