= Scouting and Guiding in Guadeloupe and Saint Martin =

Scouting and Guiding movement in Guadeloupe and Saint Martin

Scouts et Guides de France, Territoire de Guadeloupe et Saint Martin
- Location: Imm. Capitaine Pint Esc. 2 - Travée 2103, 97142 Abymes
- Country: Guadeloupe

Scouting is active on Guadeloupe and on Saint Martin, connected administratively in the Territoire de Guadeloupe et Saint Martin of the Scouts et Guides de France. The Scouts of the islands participate in many Caribbean regional Scout camps, jamborees and other Scout activities. Scouting closely follows the program of the Scouts et Guides de France. The Scouts et Guides de Saint Martin and the Scouts et Guides de Guadeloupe are subsections of the larger regional entity.

The Scout emblem incorporates elements of the old coat of arms of Guadeloupe, as well as the old arms of French Guiana and Martinique.

== See also ==
- Scouting Antiano (Dutch Scouting on the divided island of Saint Martin)
- Scouting and Guiding in France
