= The Girl Guides Association of Belize =

- Country: Belize
- Founded: 1937
- Membership: 412 (2006)
- Affiliation: World Association of Girl Guides and Girl Scouts

The Girl Guides Association of Belize is the national Guiding organization of Belize. It serves 412 members as of 2006. Founded in 1937, the girls-only organization became an associate member of the World Association of Girl Guides and Girl Scouts in 1987 and a full member in 1993.

== See also ==
- The Scout Association of Belize
