= The Girl Guides Cook Islands Association =

- Country: Cook Islands
- Founded: 1928
- Membership: about 650
- Affiliation: World Association of Girl Guides and Girl Scouts

The Girl Guides Cook Islands Association is the national Guiding organization of the Cook Islands. Founded in 1928, the girls-only organization became an associate member of the World Association of Girl Guides and Girl Scouts in 1993 and a full member in 2014.

== History ==
Guiding began in the Cook Islands in 1928, when the first Guide company began in the capital, Avarua on Rarotonga. It was one of the oldest non-governmental organizations to be founded in the Cook Islands, and at the time, it was regarded as a province of the Girl Guide Association of New Zealand. Groups of Rangers were begun in 1935 and the first Brownie group in 1937.

Groups began to be founded in the outer islands beginning with Aitutaki in 1948. In the 1950s, the organization grew in numbers, became more active in communities. It first developed into a branch association of the Girl Guide Association of New Zealand, and in 1992, it became independent. In 2014, the Association became a full member of the World Association of Girl Guides and Girl Scouts.

Membership was 1,111 in 1997. In recent years, membership has declined due to Cook Islanders migrating for better economic opportunities in Australia and New Zealand. The COVID-19 pandemic also impacted membership numbers. In 2021, membership was estimated at about 350 to 400 on Rarotonga and about 200 to 250 in the outer islands.

== Activities ==
Annual camps are held in the outer islands and are a popular Guiding activity. The camps introduce girls to different lifestyles in the Cook Islands. Other activities include learning how to cook and make tivaevae.

== Badge ==
The first badge of the Association was design in 1968. It showed a frangipani flower in the center, signifying friendship towards fellow Cook Islanders and visitors, surrounded by fifteen blue triangles, symbolizing the fifteen Cook Islands and the ocean between them, on a light blue background symbolizing the sky. The badge was changed to its current design in 2010.
