= Girl Guides Association of Tuvalu =

Scouting organization in Tuvalu

The Girl Guides Association of Tuvalu was previously a member of the World Association of Girl Guides and Girl Scouts, however membership was withdrawn in 2005.

Guiding was introduced to the Ellice Islands around 1950 by leaders from the neighboring Gilbert Islands. The movement spread quickly and in 1968 the first training was held in Funafuti, with the assistance of a trainer from New Zealand. The Tuvalu Girl Guides was established in 1975. In 1989 the Guide association signed a Deed of Transfer making the Branch Association of Tuvalu independent. Guiding is now flourishing in eight of the nine islands of Tuvalu.

== Tuvalu Girl Guides ==
Sapeta Naama Maheu Latasi (who later became Lady Latasi) was active in the Girl Guides movement. In 1975 following the separation of Tuvalu and Kiribati, she was influential in setting up the Tuvalu Girl Guides headquarters in Funafuti. She was appointed the first Tuvalu Girl Guides Commissioner.

Earlier in 1966 she set up the Olave Kindergarten, named after the founder of the Girl Guides Movement, Lady Olave Baden Powell. Lady Latasi later became the first woman to be elected to the Parliament of Tuvalu.

Meleta Faaalo was a subsequent Girl Guides Commissioner.

== Tuvalu Scout Association ==
Because the islands of Tuvalu have small number of young people, Guiding in Tuvalu carries out activities in conjunction with the Tuvalu Scout Association.

== Sources ==
- World Association of Girl Guides and Girl Scouts, World Bureau (2002), Trefoil Round the World. Eleventh Edition 1997. ISBN 0-900827-75-0
