= Association Nationale des Guides de Centrafrique =

National Guiding organization of the Central African Republic

- National Guide Association of the Central African Republic
- Country: Central African Republic
- Founded: 1952
- Membership: 9,298
- Affiliation: World Association of Girl Guides and Girl Scouts

The Association Nationale des Guides de Centrafrique (ANGC, National Guide Association of the Central African Republic) is the national Guiding organization of the Central African Republic. As of 2017 there were 9,298 members. Founded under French Equatorial Africa in 1952, the girls-only organization became a full member of the World Association of Girl Guides and Girl Scouts in 1963.

== See also ==
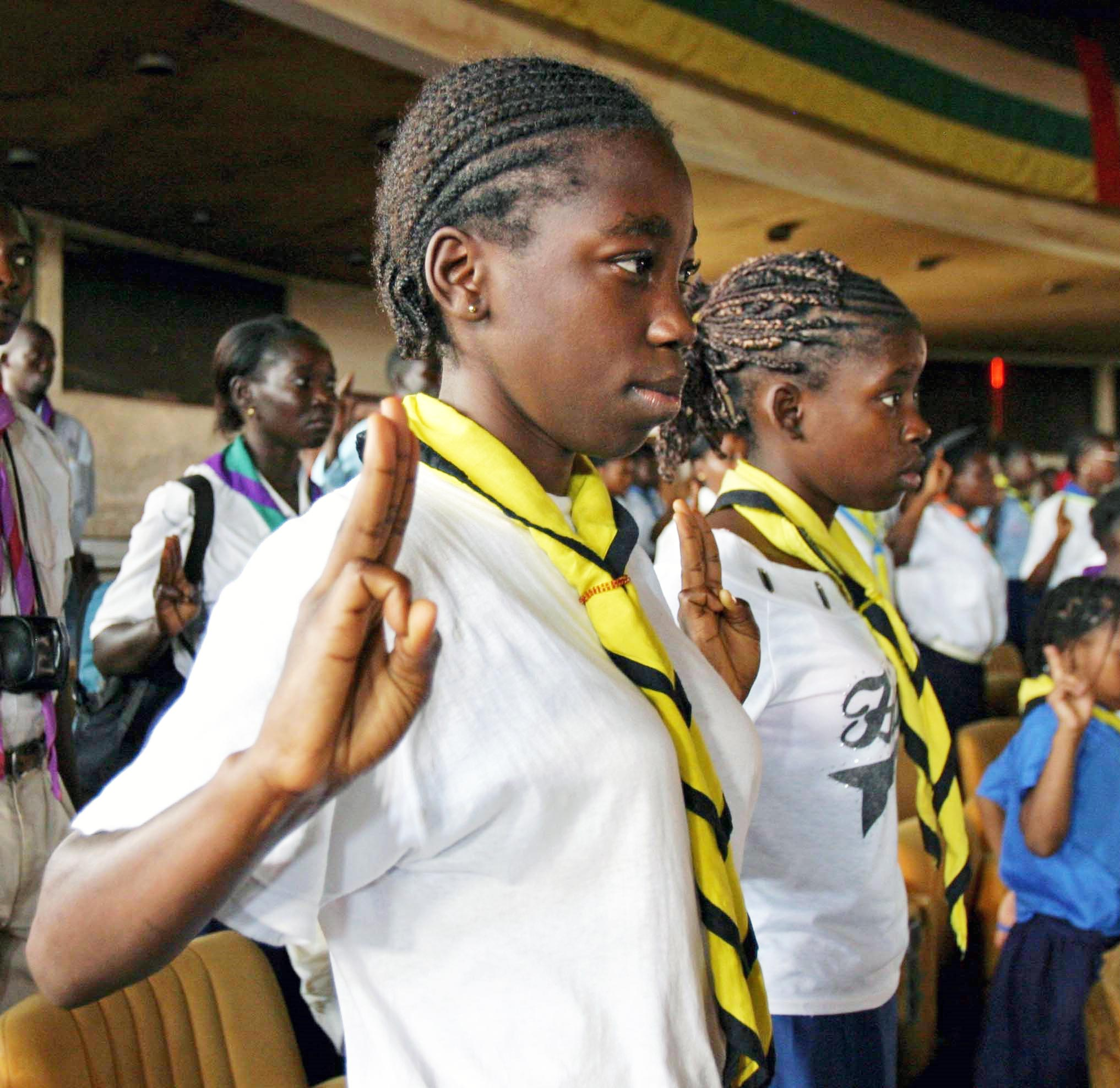
Girl Guides in the Central African Republic

- Fédération du scoutisme centrafricain
