= Vanuatu Girl Guides Association =

National Guiding organization of Vanuatu

The Vanuatu Girl Guides Association (VGGA) is the national Guiding organization of Vanuatu. It serves 178 members (as of 2003). Girl Guiding was founded in what was then the New Hebrides in 1955, and the girls-only organization became an associate member of the World Association of Girl Guides and Girl Scouts in 1990. Its WAGGGS membership was cancelled in 2008 for failing to meet the minimum criteria in the six core areas, per WAGGGS requirements.

== See also ==
- Vanuatu branch of The Scout Association
