= Association des Guides du Togo =

National Guiding organization of Togo

- Guides Association of Togo
- Country: Togo
- Founded: 1942
- Membership: 2,495
- Affiliation: World Association of Girl Guides and Girl Scouts

The Association des Guides du Togo (AGT, Guides Association of Togo) is the national Guiding organization of Togo. It serves 2,495 members (as of 2003). Founded in 1942, the girls-only organization became a full member of the World Association of Girl Guides and Girl Scouts in 1963.

== See also ==
- Association Scoute du Togo
