= Sri Lanka Girl Guides Association =

National Guiding organization

- Membership badge of the Sri Lanka Girl Guides Association
- Referred as: SLGGA
- Headquarters: 10, Sir Marcus Fernando Mawatha, Colombo, Sri Lanka
- Country: Sri Lanka
- Founded: 1917
- Membership: 54,824 (2016)
- President: Dr. Shanthi Wilson
- Chief Commissioner: Dr. Kusantha Herath
- Affiliation: World Association of Girl Guides and Girl Scouts
- Website girlguideslk.org
- Little Friend

The Sri Lanka Girl Guides Association (SLGGA, Lanka Baladhakshika Samajaya; Sinhala:ශ්‍රී ලංකා බාළදක්ෂිකා සංගමය; Tamil: இலங்கைப் மகளீர் சாரணர்க் கழகம்) is the national Guiding organization of Sri Lanka. It serves 54,824 members (as of 2016). Founded in 1917, the girls-only organization became a full member of the World Association of Girl Guides and Girl Scouts in 1951.

== History ==
Girl Guiding was first introduced to Sri Lanka by Ms. J.C.Green, for young girls of Girls' High School Kandy. The Guiding company was then named as "Rosa Kekulu" meaning "Rose Buds". In 1918, Sri Lankan Girl Guide Association joined hands with the London Association. The first Annual General Meeting was held in 1919. In 1921 Ranger companies were opened in Kandy and Colombo. The first Guide company in Colombo was opened at Methodist College. Lord and Lady Baden-Powell came to Sri Lanka to visit it.

== Program and ideals ==
In the 1960s the image of Girl Guiding in Sri Lanka was changed to give it a local character. New Sri Lanka badges for all ranks in the three branches were introduced.

SLGGA is divided into seven sections:

- Butterflies - (aged 5 - 8 years)
- Little Friends - (aged 8 - 12 years)
- Guides - (aged 12 - 17 years)
- Rangers - (aged 17 - 21 years)
- Youth - (aged 18 - 30 years)
- The Differently Abled Guides

== Symbols of the movement ==
=== The left-handshake ===
The Founder of the World Girl Guides Association suggested a Left Handshake to recognise other members of the Movement, and it is still used widely. When asked to explain the origin, Lord Baden-Powell related a legend told to him in West Africa: two hostile, neighbour communities decided to try to live together in peace, and so they flung down their shields, which were carried on the left arm, and advanced, unprotected, to greet each other with their left hands extended in trust and friendship. This was adapted in Sri Lankan Girl Guide movement.

=== The salute ===
To make the sign, raise the three middle fingers of the right hand, with the thumb holding the little finger down. The three fingers represent the three parts of the Girl Guide and Girl Scout promise and echo the core values of integrity, citizenship and spirituality. The hand is raised and held at the forehead as in a salute. This is practiced worldwide by girl guides.

== Sri Lanka Girl Guide flag ==
To give a local face to the Association, in the 1960s, three new Badges for the three ranks of the three branches were introduced. With the Sri Lankan Girl Guide Association's logo (an elephant in the centre of the "Thripatha") in the center with dark blue background, the flag was designed. It is designed that when hoisted, the elephant is facing the flag pole. It was introduced in 1968.

== Girl Guide motto ==
The motto of Girl Guides is "Be Prepared".

== Girl Guide promise ==
I promise on my honour to do my best:
to do my duty, to my Religion and Country, to help other people at all times, and to live by the Guide Law.

== Girl Guide laws ==
1. A Guide is honest, reliable and can be trusted.
2. A Guide is loyal.
3. A Guide is considerate and helpful at all times.
4. A Guide is a sister to every other Guide.
5. A Guide is friendly and courteous.
6. A Guide is compassionate to all living things.
7. A Guide respects authority.
8. A Guide is courageous and faces all situations with understanding.
9. A Guide uses resources wisely.
10. A Guide respects herself and seeks to understand all human beings.

== Overseas branches ==
An overseas branch of the Sri Lanka Girl Guides Association operates at the Sri Lankan School in Muscat, Oman.

In 2009, Girl Guides at the Sri Lankan School in Muscat had their camp in October cancelled to prevent the spread of Swine flu. The Guides paper recycling project was also discontinued for the same reason.

== See also ==
- Sri Lanka Scout Association
- World Association of Girl Guides and Girl Scouts
- Girl Guides and Girl Scouts
