= Het Arubaanse Padvindsters Gilde =

- The Arubanese Guilde of Girl Guides
- Location: Sero Preto #10-D, San Nicolas
- Country: Aruba
- Founded: June 12, 1941
- Membership: 351
- Affiliation: World Association of Girl Guides and Girl Scouts

Het Arubaanse Padvindsters Gilde (APG, The Aruban Guild of Girl Guides) is the national Guiding organization of Aruba. It serves 351 members (as of 2018). Founded in 1941, the girls-only organization became an associate member of the World Association of Girl Guides and Girl Scouts in 1993 and a full member in 2017.

== History ==
The Gilde was started in 1941 by women who, inspired by the silver jubilee celebrations of the Netherlands Girl Scouts, began independent groups in Aruba. In 1946 they joined Scouting Nederland, as Aruba is a Dutch colony. In 1953, the Gilde became autonomous and in 1972, it became fully independent. Guiding declined in Aruba for the next fifteen years until a revival in 1986, and from then on, groups no longer restricted membership to a single Christian denomination.

The Gilde joined the World Association of Girl Guides and Girl Scouts in 1993 as an associate member. Membership in 1998 was 185 members, and 285 in 2016. It became a full member in 2017. The next year, there were 351 registered Girl Guides.

== Program sections ==
The association is divided into six sections according to age:

- Beyisima - ages 4 to 7
- Brownie - ages 7 to 11
- Guide - ages 11 to 17
- Pioneers - ages 17 to 21
- Young Leader - ages 18+
- Leader - ages 21+

== Activities ==
In 1991, the Gilde published a songbook, and in 1995 it began a band, which plays during World Thinking Day celebrations and national holidays. In the 1990s, the Gilde began updating its programs to focus on Aruban history and culture. In 2025, the World Thinking Day celebrations explored Aruba's wildlife and culture. Guides also volunteer for environmental activities such as Keep Aruba Clean and cleaning up beaches.

== See also ==
- Scouting Aruba
