= Scouting Aruba =

- Location: Pavia Park 113, Paradera
- Country: Aruba
- Membership: 456
- President National Committee: Anna M. Richardson-Peters
- Chief Commissioner: Christopher F.A. Lake
- Secretary National Committee: Jairzinho R.G. Theodora
- International Commissioner: Heinrich J. Hessen
- Affiliation: World Organization of the Scout Movement
- Website www.scoutingaruba.com

Scouting in Aruba shared a common history with the other Netherlands Antilles until the political separation of the island from the Netherlands. Scouting Aruba is a Full Member of the Interamerican Region of the World Organization of the Scout Movement.

Scouting Aruba consists of 13 groups, divided into 3 districts. There is one Scout group for people with mental and physical limitations. Scouting Aruba has 456 members as of 2021.

Scouts in Aruba participate in many Caribbean camps, often traveling by boat to camp on nearby islands with Scouts from neighboring countries.

On 27 February 2016, the World Scout Committee recognized Scouting Aruba as the National Scout Organization of the Aruba and conferred it with Full WOSM Membership with voting rights. The membership certificate was presented to the organization in the 41st World Scout Conference, which was conducted in Baku of Azerbaijan in 2017.

== Program and ideals ==
- Beavers-ages 5 to 7 (boys and girls)
- Cubs-ages 7 to 10 (mixed sections exist)
- Scouts-ages 10 to 14 (mixed sections exist)
- Explorers-ages 15 to 18 (boys and girls)
- Rovers-ages 18 to 23 (boys and girls)

The Scout Motto is Be Prepared, Semper Prepara in Papiamento, and Weest Paraat in Dutch.

The Scouting Aruba emblem consists of Scouting symbols and colors corresponding with the flag of Aruba. The two five-point stars are taken off the Fleur-de-lis and placed upon each other. The logo is designed by Mr. Juan Martijn.

== Promise ==
=== Beavers ===
(Dutch)

Ik beloof lief voor God en mijn land te zijn.

(Papiamento)

Mi ta primiti di stima Dios y mi pais.

(English)

I promise to love God and my country.

=== Cubs ===
(Dutch)

Ik beloof mijn best te zullen doen.
Mijn plicht te doen tegenover God en mijn land,
de wet van de welpenhorde te gehoorzamen en iedere dag een goede daad te zullen doen .

(Papiamento)

Mi ta primiti di hasi mi best pa cu
cumpli cu mi deber pa cu Dios i mi pais
obedese e ley di welp y di hasi bon obra tur dia.

(English)

Do my best
to do my duty to God and my country
to pack law
to do good every day.

=== Scouts ===
(Dutch)

Op mijn erewoord beloof ik ernstig te zullen trachten
mijn plicht te doen tegen over God en mijn land,
iedereen te helpen waar ik kan en de padvinderswet te gehoorzamen.

(Papiamento)

Riba mi palabra di honor mi ta primiti di hasi tur esfuerso
pa cumpli cu mi deber pa cu Dios I mi pais
yuda tur hende tur caminda cu mi por
i obedese lei scout

(English)

On my honor I promise that I will do my best
to do my Duty to God and my country
to help other people at all time
and obey the scout law

== Scout Law ==
=== Beavers ===
(Dutch)

Een bever heeft plezier, werkt hard en helpt zijn familie en vrienden.

(Papiamento)

Un bever tin plaser, e ta traha duru y ta yuda su famia y amigunan.

(English)

A beaver plays with joy, works hard and helps his family and friends.

=== Cubs ===
(Dutch)

De welp volgt de oude wolf
De welp is moedig en houdt vol.

(Papiamento)

Un welp ta sigui e wolf
Un welp ta honesto, tin brio y ta persevera

(English)

The Cub follows the wolf.
The Cub is honest, has courage and perseverance.

=== Scouts ===
(Dutch)

1. Een padvinder is eerlijk.
2. Een padvinder is trouw.
3. Een padvinder dient zich nuttig te maken en anderen te helpen.
4. Een padvinder is een vriend voor allen en een broeder voor alle andere padvinders.
5. Een padvinder is voorkomend en beleefd.
6. Een padvinder beschermt dieren en planten.
7. Een padvinder weet te gehoorzamen.
8. Een padvinder zet door alle omstandigheden.
9. Een padvinder is spaarzaam.
10. Een padvinder is rein in gedachten, woord en daad.

(Papiamento)

#Un scout ta honesto. #Un scout ta file. #Un scout ta yuda otro. #Un scout ta un amigo pa tur otro scout. #Un scout tin bon manera. #Un scout ya proteha mata y bestia. #Un scout ta obedese. #Un scout tur ora ta sigui pa dilanti. #Un scout ta spaar. #Un scout ta un bon ehempel.

(English)

1. A Scout's honor is to be trusted.
2. A Scout is loyal.
3. A Scout is to be useful and to help others.
4. A Scout is a brother is every other scout.
5. A Scout is courteous.
6. A Scout protects animals and plants.
7. A Scout is obedient.
8. A Scout perseveres.
9. A Scout is thrifty.
10. A Scout is clean in his thoughts, words and deeds.

=== Explorers ===
(Dutch)

Op mijn erewoord beloof ik dat ik mij zodanig zal ontwikkelen zodat ik God beter kan lief hebben en dienen
Mijn medemensen kan respecteren en helpen
Mijn land ten dienste kan zijn
En mijn best te doen mij te houden aan het Huishoudelijk Reglement van mijn afdeling

(Papiamento)

Riba mi palabra di honor mi ta primiti cu lo mi desaroya mi mes pa stima y sirbi Dios miho.
Pa respeta y yuda otro personanan pa sirbi mi pais y pa hasi lo miho pa obedese e reglanan di mi seccion

(English)

On my honour I promise that I will develop my self so that I may love and serve God better.
To respect and help others.
To be in service of my country.
And to do my best to keep to the regulations of my crew.

== See also ==
- Het Arubaanse Padvindsters Gilde
