= History of scouting in the Philippines =

Various organizations have promoted Scouting activities in the Philippines: the YMCA, the Boy Scouts of America, the Camp Fire Girls, the Boy Scouts of the Philippines, the Girl Scouts of the Philippines, and the Boy Scouts of China.

== Beginnings ==
Youth Scouting was founded in the Philippines in 1910 in Manila by Elwood Stanley Brown (1883-1924) of the YMCA. The Boy Scouts of Calivo (now Kalibo in Aklan) was founded on April 22, 1922, by a certain Mr. Ong. The Boy Scouts of America Philippine Islands Council No. 545 was founded in 1923 in Manila by the Rotary Club of Manila. The Boy Scouts of the Philippines was legally established in 1936 in Manila through the work of three men: Josephus Stevenot, Tomás Confesor, and Manuel Quezon, and started activities in 1938. The term "Boy Scouts of the Philippines" was first used by Theodore Roosevelt in 1911 and by Sir Robert Baden-Powell in 1912.

The 1973 celebration of the Golden Jubilee of Philippine Scouting and the Golden Jubilee Jamboree of the Boy Scouts of the Philippines were dated from establishing the BSA Philippine Islands Council No. 545 in 1923. Still, the 2014 "Philippine Scouting Centennial Jamboree" commemorated the founding of the Lorillard Spencer Troop in 1914.

In 1910, the first troops were organized by Elwood Stanley Brown, Physical Director of the Manila YMCA. In 1912, Elwood Stanley Brown was recognized by Baden-Powell as "Chief Scoutmaster." In 1913, troops were organized by Mark Thompson, Antonio Torres, Domingo Ponce, and Francisco Varona. In 1914, the Lorillard Spencer Troop, organized in November in Zamboanga City by Sherman L. Kiser, was organized as Mindanao's first Scout troop.

In 1921, Scouting started at Silliman Institute under the auspices of its church, one of the first in Negros. They applied for registration to BSA National Headquarters, New York, in 1922 and received their document in January 1923 (some eight or nine months before the creation of the BSA Philippine Islands Council No. 545). On April 19, 1922, Mr. Ong of Calivo, Capiz (now Kalibo, Aklan) organized the Boy Scouts of Calivo which the Governor General Leonard Wood at that time acknowledged in his letter dated January 2, 1923. In 1923, the Rotary Club established the Boy Scouts of America Philippine Islands Council No. 545 in October, formalizing the formation of a singular national scout organization in the country. An Order of the Arrow lodge was later formed in the capital.

In 1931, the first test Cub and Sea Scout formations were formed to test these two concepts for broader implementation.

In 1933, the Philippines first participated in an international Scout event, with the BSA Philippine Islands Council delegation embedded in the BSA contingent to the 4th World Scout Jamboree in Budapest, Hungary. In 1934, Rover Scouting was introduced. The BSA Shanghai District was placed under the supervision of the BSA Philippine Islands Council No. 545.

== Foundation of the movement ==
The Boy Scouts of the Philippines was established by a legislative act in 1936. Josephus Stevenot was the first BSP President and Chief Scout. In 1937, the BSA Philippine Islands Council No. 545, meeting in October, decided to hand over its properties and responsibilities to the nascent BSP.

On January 1, 1938, President Manuel Quezon inaugurated the BSP. Exequiél Villacorta was appointed the first "Chief Scout Executive" of the Boy Scouts of the Philippines, in imitation of the BSA Chief Scout Executive.

In 1946, in time for its 10th anniversary, the BSP was declared a full member of the World Organization of the Scout Movement. A decade later, the BSP was selected to host the WOSM's Asia-Pacific Region.

In 1947, the BSP participated in its first international event, with the BSP contingent at the 6th World Scout Jamboree in Moisson, France. In 1953, the first Wood Badge course was conducted at BSP Camp Gre-Zar in Novaliches, Quezon City. In 1954, the first BSP National Scout Jamboree was held at Rolling Hills, Balara, Quezon City.

Dr. Mariano Villarama de los Santos served on the World Scout Committee from 1957 until 1959, the first Filipino member of the committee.

In 1959, the 10th World Scout Jamboree was held at the National Scout Reservation, University of the Philippines, Los Baños, at the foot of Mount Makiling, in the province of Laguna. This was the first World Scout Jamboree outside Europe and Canada.

== Filipinization of the scouting system ==
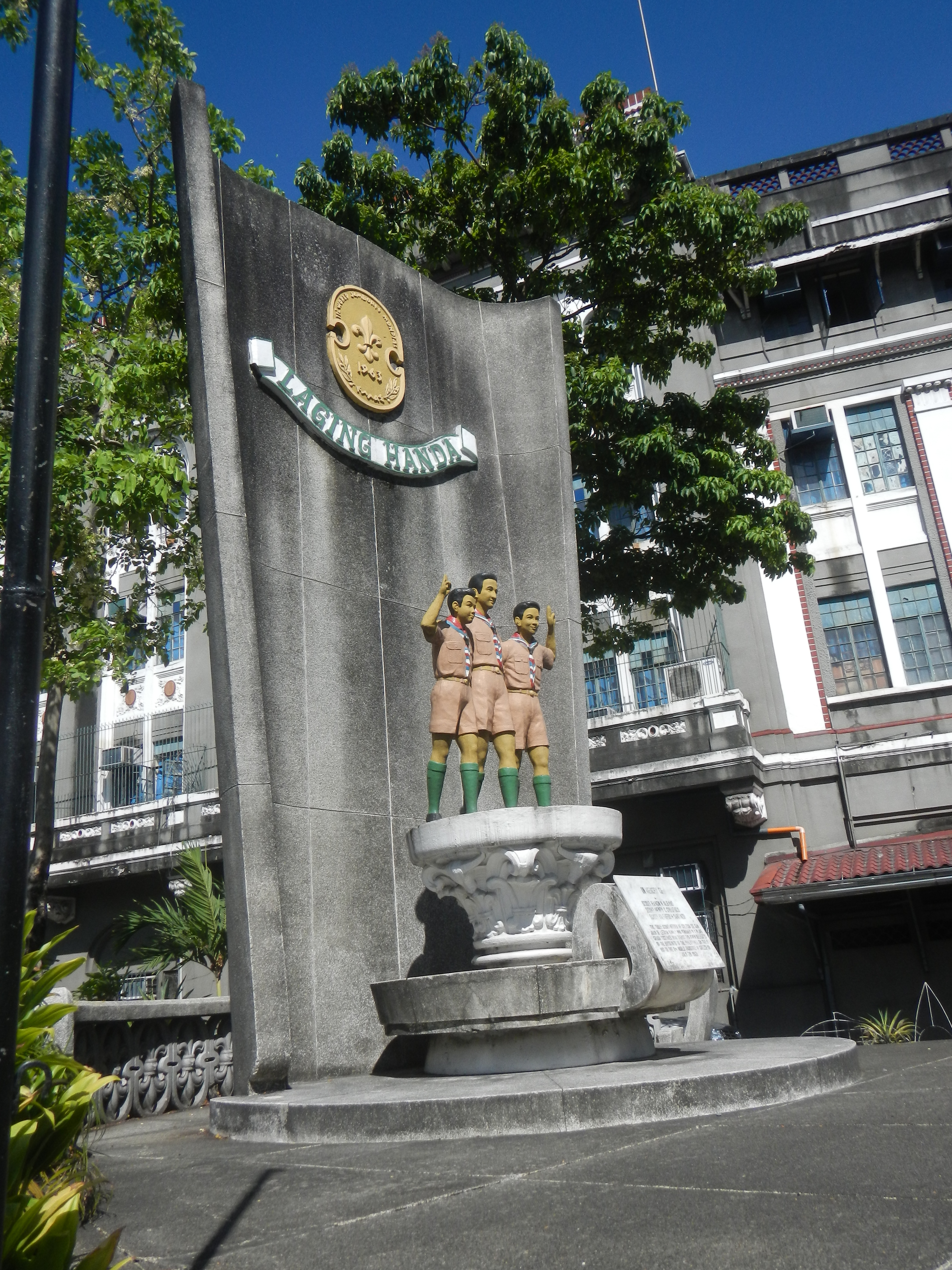
The Boy Scouts monument of Letran students

In 1960, the BSP began the nationalization of the scouting system. The BSP Cub Scout program was revised to replace American symbols (e.g. Bobcat, Bear Cub, Wolf Cub, Lion Cub) with Philippine motifs (e.g. Kawan, Mother Usa, Chief Usa, Young Usa, Lauan, Molave, Narra and Leaping Usa). In 1961, the Boy Scout program was revised to replace American symbols (e.g., Eagle) with Philippine motifs (e.g. Maginoo, Jose Rizal). In 1963, 24 members of the BSP delegation to the 11th World Scout Jamboree in Marathon, Greece, died in a plane crash in the sea off the coast of Mumbai, India. To honor their memory, a memorial was erected in Quezon City, and a year later, the Quezon City council named several streets after the fallen Scouts.

In August 1968, Boy Scouts, Rovers, and Scouters joined in the search-and-rescue operations for victims of the Ruby Tower collapse caused by the Casiguran earthquake. For the services rendered by the Scouts, the BSP organization was awarded by President Ferdinand Marcos with a Presidential Gold Medal the following year. In 1970, Senior Scouting officially launched as part of the BSP program, replacing Explorers. It has three sections: Air (grey uniform), Land (dark green), and Sea (white). In 1971, Ambassador Antonio C. Delgado was elected Chairman of the World Scout Conference, becoming the first Filipino to hold this position. In 1972, BSP membership hit the one-million mark. In 1973, the Golden Jubilee Jamboree and the first Asia-Pacific Jamboree were held at the National Scout Reservation, University of the Philippines Los Baños, Laguna. The jamboree song, "Kapatirang Paglilingkod," reflected the Bagong Lipunan regime of President Ferdinand Marcos. In 1974–75, the Cub Scout name was Filipinized: The Filipino alphabet then did not include the letter C, so "Cub" was replaced with "Kab". However, since "kab" was not a Filipino word, it was contrived as an acronym for "Kabataan Alay sa Bayan" written in uppercase.

In 1975–86, in compliance with the orders of President Marcos, the Boy Scouts of the Philippines was renamed "Kapatirang Scout ng Pilipinas," which translates literally to "Scout Brotherhood of the Philippines." The Scout age groups were reduced from four to two. The Scout Oath and Scout Law were revised. A new Scout badge was devised. President Marcos took the title of Chief Scout, the first Philippine head of state to hold the title.

In 1986, the BSP marked its Golden Jubilee. In the aftermath of the People Power Revolution, the name Kapatirang Scout ng Pilipinas was abandoned, and the organization reverted to its original name, "Boy Scouts of the Philippines." In 1990–91, a KID Scouting program was created for pre-school boys. Since "kid" is English and not Filipino, it was contrived as an acronym for "Kabataang Iminumulat Diwa" and written in all caps. In 1991, the 12th Asia-Pacific Jamboree was held at the Philippine Scouting Center, University of the Philippines Los Baños, Laguna. In 1992, the old BSP badge was reinstated. In 1993, the Philippines hosted the first ASEAN Scout Jamboree. In 1997, the 2nd World Scout Parliamentary Union was held in Manila. In 1999, the first Venture Scout Jamboree was held on Ilian Hills, Iriga, Camarines Sur. In 2007, the BSP observed the world centennial of the Scout Movement. In 2009–10, the BSP hosted the 26th Asia-Pacific Jamboree from 28 December to 3 January. This was the third APR Jamboree in the Philippines.

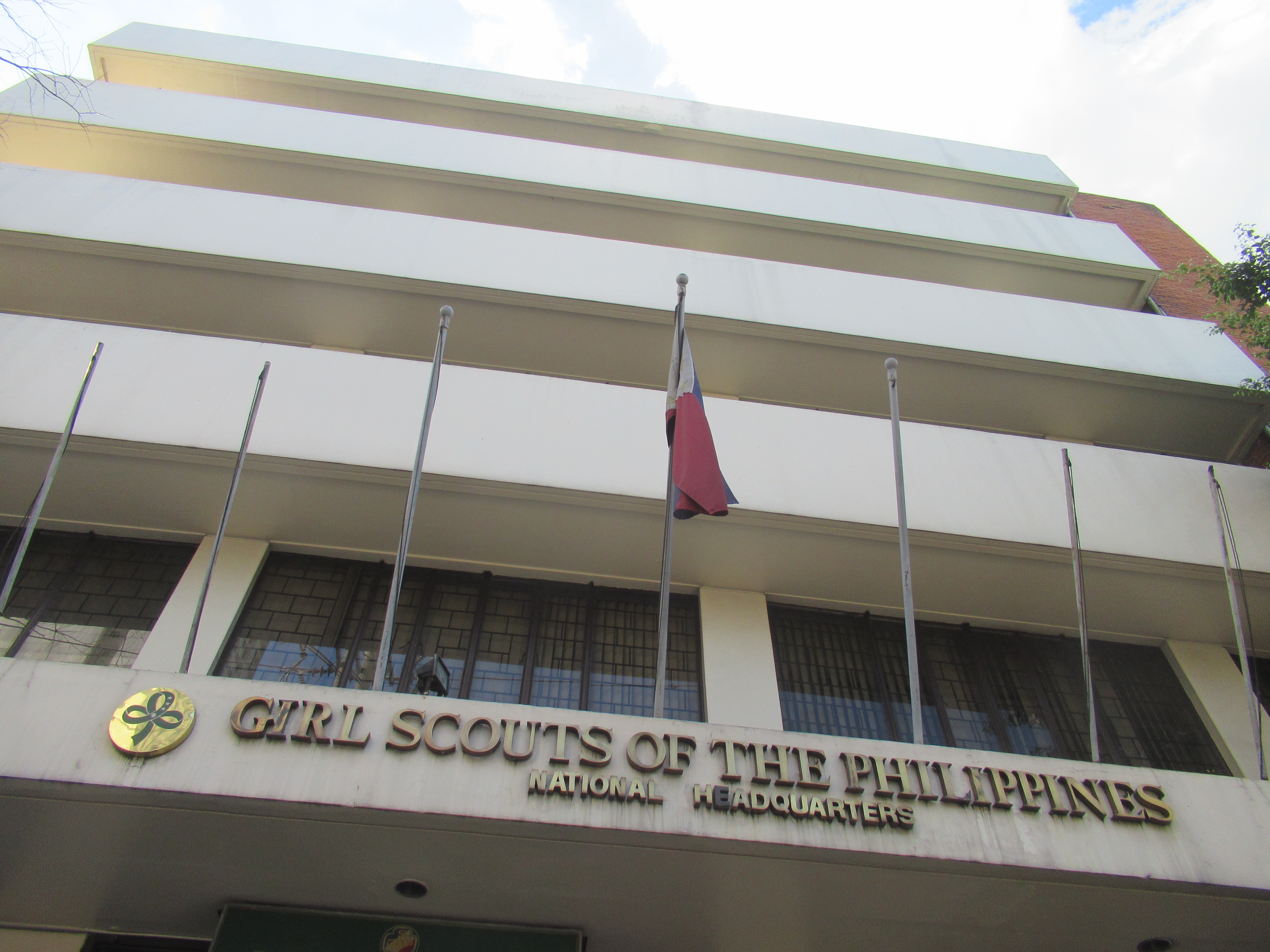
Girl Scouts of the Philippines in 2023

In 2011, the BSP celebrated 75 years of Philippine Scouting. In 2013, the National Peace Jamboree was held on Mount Makiling in Laguna, at Capitol Hills Scout Camp in Cebu, and the BSP's Camp Malagos in Davao.

In 2014, a Centennial Jamboree of the defunct Lorillard Spencer Troop was held in three venues: Marikina (Luzon), Cebu City (Visayas), and Zamboanga City (Mindanao).
