= Scouting and Guiding in Tonga =

The Scout and Guide movement in Tonga is served by

- Tonga branch of The Scout Association
- The Girl Guides Association of the Kingdom of Tonga, associate of the World Association of Girl Guides and Girl Scouts
