= Cambodia Scouts =

National Scouting organization in Cambodia

National Association of Cambodian Scouts
- Country: Cambodia
- Founded: September 2005
- Founders: Scout Organization of Cambodia, Cambodian Scouts
- Membership: 58,050
- President: Hangchuon Naron
- Affiliation: World Organization of the Scout Movement

The Cambodia Scouts (CS; Khmer: កាយរឹទ្ធិជាតិកម្ពុជា, [Kayarith Cheat Kampuchea]) is the national Scouting organization in Cambodia. It was founded in September 2005 through the merger of the Scout Organization of Cambodia and the Cambodian Scouts (Khmer: ខេមរកាយារិទ្ធិកម្ពុជា, Khemarak Kayarit Kampuchea) and became a member of the World Organization of the Scout Movement (WOSM) on 1 July 2008. The coeducational association serves 59,275 members as of 2021.

== History ==
=== Earlier Scouting organizations ===
The original Cambodian Scout Association Angkar Khemarak Kayarith (AKK; អង្គការខេមរកាយារិទ្ធិ) was created in 1934, under the direction of Prince Sisowath Monireth and other leaders. This first era of Cambodian Scouting spread over several provinces and numbered more than 1,000 members.

André Lefèvre, chief of the Eclaireurs de France, set up a training camp for 60 Scoutmasters from all over French Indochina. At the end of 1937, French Scouting sent Scoutmaster Raymond Schlemmer to the Cambodian, Laotian, and Vietnamese areas of Indochina to oversee the setting up of the Fédération Indochinoise des Associations du Scoutisme (FIAS, Indochinese Federation of Scouting Associations) in all three regions.

From 1939 through 1945, the political situation affected Scouting activities all across the country, as World War II engendered a movement for an independent Cambodia. The French began to lose control and were finally overthrown by Japanese intervention. This ceased the French Scouts' activity in Cambodia, as well as all Scouting activities.

In 1956, the Cambodian Scouting movement was transformed into the Scouts of the Queen. That year, there were 500 active Scouts and Guides in Phnom Penh, and some 700 Scouts in the provinces of the Kingdom of Cambodia.

In 1957, under the direction of socialist-leaning Prince Norodom Sihanouk, the Angkar Khemarak Kayarith was transformed into the Royal Khmer Socialist Khmer Youth (JSRK), with Sihanouk himself serving as president of the state ruled organization, now controlled by the Royal government. The 2,000 members and the leaders of Cambodian Scouting were permitted by the government to carry on activities. Scouts and Scout leaders attended the 8th World Scout Jamboree in 1955 in Canada and the 10th World Scout Jamboree in 1959 in the Philippines, among them Prince Norodom Yuvaneath, the son of Norodom Sihanouk.

On 1 November 1964, Prince Sisowath Essaro, then President of the Angkar Khemarak Kayarith, announced the dissolution of the Cambodian Boy Scout Association, whose members were subsequently integrated into the Jeunesse Socialiste Royale Khmer, a government-sponsored socialist youth movement.

In 1972, the Cambodian Scouts were reestablished for a short period with ten groups, confined to the capital in Phnom Penh. In 1975, the movement was banned by the Khmer Rouge communist regime.

Cambodian Scouting in exile existed at least into the early 1990s in Los Angeles, alongside fellow Vietnamese Scouting in exile and Laotian Scouting in exile groups.

=== Reemergence of Scouting after 1990 ===
Membership badge of Cambodian Scouts

As the political system changed in the country, Scouting was gradually reestablished and Scout groups were organized in the refugee camps at the Thai border. After the 1993 election supported by the United Nations, Beat Gruninger, a Swiss Scout leader was commissioned by the World Scout Bureau to coordinate with Cambodian leaders for the possible rebirth of Scouting in the recovering land.

In 1994, two visits were made by the Asia-Pacific Region to assess the development of the Cambodian Scout movement. As with Afghanistan, Scouting was conducted under the auspices of a government agency, in this case the Department of Youth and Sports. Asia-Pacific Region staff met the Minister of Education, Youth and Sports and several other government officials, after which full government support was assured.

In April 1996, the first Basic Unit Leaders Training Course was held in Phnom Penh, assisted by the National Scout Organization of Thailand and the Asia-Pacific Regional office.

Subsequently, two main Scout groupings emerged in Cambodia and were registered in July 2000: the Scout Organization of Cambodia and the Cambodian Scouts. Both Scout associations were run by rival political parties. For this reason, WOSM could not admit either of them as a member. In the effort to unite these into a new single national association, the Coordinating Scout Committee of Cambodia (CSCC) was created on 21 April 2000.

In December 2002, Cambodia's scouts faced a national crisis as they were excluded from the 20th World Scout Jamboree held in nearby Thailand due to alleged political affiliations of the two main scout groups in the country, the Cambodian Scouts and the Scout Association of Cambodia. The World Organization of the Scout Movement (WOSM), which strictly prohibits political affiliations, did not recognize either group, resulting in their exclusion from the Jamboree. Despite attempts by WOSM officials to broker a deal between the two sides, no resolution was reached. Kong Thann, the high commissioner of the Cambodian Scouts, disbanded his board of directors in December 2002 due to their ties to Funcinpec and stated his intention to quit as high commissioner once a suitable replacement was found.

A working group composed of leaders from the two groups was established in May 2005 to work on a new constitution and new bylaws. In September 2005, the National Association of Cambodian Scouts was created. It sought formal government recognition to launch it as a nongovernmental organization.

The World Scout Bureau Asia Pacific Regional Office reported in their May 2006 Newsletter, that the first annual general meeting of the National Association of Cambodian Scouts was held on 27 April 2006 in Phnom Penh, at which the constitution was adopted and the first office-bearers were elected.

=== Joining the World Organization of the Scouts Movement ===
The World Scout Bureau received an application for membership in the World Organization of the Scout Movement from the National Association of Cambodian Scouts in 2007. Members of the World Scout Bureau and of the Asia-Pacific Regional Office assessed the organization in November 2007; they proposed its admission to WOSM. Full WOSM membership was granted on 1 July 2008.

The National Association of Cambodian Scouts organized their first National Scout Jamboree, to be held in December 2008, close to the Angkor Wat World Heritage Site.

The National Association of Cambodian Scouts (NACS) organized its first National Strategic Planning Workshop in 2010, aimed at strengthening capacity building for the sustainable growth of Scouting in Cambodia, with support from the World Organization of the Scout Movement, Asia-Pacific Region.

=== Committee NSO Visit to Cambodia (2011) ===
The Committee NSO Visit (CNV) to Cambodia, which began on 14 March 2011, was a significant occasion aimed at enhancing awareness and understanding of the current needs of Cambodia Scouts in its work to develop Scouting in the country. The three-day mission, led by the 1st Vice Chairman Prakorb Mukura, started with a simple opening ceremony at the Council of Ministers complex at the heart of Phnom Penh. The mission focused on the major needs of a newly established scout association such as management, youth program, and adult resources.

The regional team consisted of 2nd Vice Chairman Dr. Mukyuddin bin Sarwani, Committee member Nicholas Tan and Consultant Mohamed Ali Khalid and the executives of the regional office. The Cambodian side included distinguished Scout leaders such as Vice Presidents Mr Tuon Siphann and Mr Kong Uok; Chief Commissioner Phan Sokim; Secretary General Mr. Lak Sam Ath and both the Programme and Adult resources Commissioners and their deputy Commissioners.

The first day discussion highlighted the variety of Scout activities in community service, social services and doing good deeds. These activities ranged from good sanitation to environment awareness, from maintaining public order in large national events to cleanliness around the city. Scouts were involved in educating the public on proper disposal of garbage, traffic control and tree planting in over 9 provinces. Thousands of Scouts volunteered in the renovation of school libraries.

The national strategic plan for 2010-2013 had six priorities, among which was membership growth aiming at 150,000 members by 2020. This called for vigorous training of more unit leaders. An Assistant Leader Training course was proposed for November 2011. Arrangements were also underway for the presentation of the country's first Wood Badge beads to a group of 44 scout leaders who would immediately become the front-runners in conducting orientation courses nationwide. Basic training courses for adult leaders were planned for early next year to train sufficient leaders who would organize new Scout groups.

In the discussion, options were shared in strengthening community-based scouting with the help of other international agencies who are running various social projects within Cambodia. Possibilities were explored where Scouting could reach children in established institutions such as street children homes, half-way houses, orphanages, delinquent centers and prisons.

Immediately after the 3-day CNV mission, a four-day program development workshop was conducted by the Asia-Pacific Region. The workshop aimed at creating a greater understanding of the Youth Program Policy and the cycle of program development. The recently adopted World Scouting strategy towards leadership for life at the Brazil Conference formed part of the initial inputs of the workshop.

The coeducational association served 5,404 members as of 2011.

=== World Scout Jamboree 2023 ===
A contingent of Cambodia Scouts attended the 25th World Scout Jamboree in the South Korea from Aug. 1 to 12, 2023, marking their sixth participation in such an international event. The contingent, led by Vice President HE Ms. Kim Sethany, was advised by HE Dr. Hang Chuon Naron, Minister of the Ministry of Education, Youth and Sports (MoEYS) and President of Cambodia Scouts, to uphold national values and promote Cambodian culture. The delegation of 47 young scouts participated in various camp activities, while senior delegates attended as guests of honor.

The Cambodian Scouts have requested the World Scout Committee for Asia-Pacific to provide technical assistance and scouting skills to develop youth policies and programs in line with the Ministry of Education, Youth and Sport's curriculum. Kim Sethany, secretary of state of the ministry and vice-president of Cambodia Scouts, has also called for special training courses for scout leaders to receive Wood Badge certificates in accordance with the World Scout Movement training framework. The Cambodian Scouts are seeking to include two-hour outdoor programs per week in the curriculum of public and private educational institutions. Additionally, they have requested assistance in organizing the first national scout music competition in 2024 and producing scout songs for promotion via social media. These requests were made during a meeting with the Asia Pacific Scout Region, part of the World Scout Bureau of the World Organization of the Scout Movement, in Phnom Penh on August 24. The Scout Cooperation Department stated that the director of the Asia Pacific bureau pledged to study the requests and prepare a detailed program on the technical content and requirements. On August 1, Cambodia Scouts approved a five-year strategic plan (2023-2027) to promote its members’ activities in the community in line with the UN's Sustainable Development Goals.

== Program ==
To further the development of Scouting in Cambodia the association focuses on:

- Orientation of adult leaders on Scouting at all levels
- Training of adult leaders
- Participating in various community development/service projects
- Production of a range of Scouting literature
- Establishment of partnerships with government and other external agencies
- Participation in regional and other national level Scout activities.

The National Association of Cambodian Scouts is divided in three sections according to age:

- Cub Scouts
- Scouts
- Rovers.

== Scout ideals ==
As with most other countries, the Scout sign and salute are made with three fingers.

The Scout Motto is ប្រុងជានិច្ច Brong Chea nich (meaning "be prepared").

The national heraldic badge features Angkor Wat, which is also featured on the national flag.

== See also ==
- Scouting and Guiding in Cambodia
