= Scouting in Laos =

ສກຸດລາວ
- The membership badge of Scouts Lao, superimposed with the Lao language character ລ (L)
- Founded: 1937; 1959
- Defunct: 1975

Guides Lao

At present, there is no known Scouting program in Laos. It is only one of the four of the world's independent countries that do not have Scouting.

The highest award, the Erawan Scout, was red with a triple-headed white elephant on a pedestal beneath a parasol, expressing the ancient name of the country, "Land of a Million Elephants."

In the 1930s, André Lefèvre, chief of the Eclaireurs de France, set up a training camp for 60 Scoutmasters from all over French Indochina. At the end of 1937, French Scouting sent Scoutmaster Raymond Schlemmer to the Cambodian, Laotian, and Vietnamese areas of Indochina to oversee the setting up of the Fédération Indochinoise des Associations du Scoutisme (FIAS, Indochinese Federation of Scouting Associations) in all three regions.

From 1939 through 1945, the political situation affected Scouting activities all across the country, as World War II engendered a movement for an independent Laos. The French began to lose control and were finally overthrown by Japanese intervention. This ceased the French Scouts' activity in Laos, as well as all Scouting activities.

In 1948, a new attempt was first organized in Luang Prabang high school with two French teachers, André-Louis Aufauvre and Guy Leherbier, and scouters to gather boys and young men for social and humanitarian works. During the war, they were sent to the front line, delivering food and medical supplies to the bases, then carrying the dead and the wounded back to the safety zones through the jungle of Laos. In the cities, they were assigned to help with refugees, direct traffics and more. They were a big part of labor during the famous Vientiane flood of 1966. The Vientiane troop was well organized by Mr. George Dulieu in 1952.

Reestablished after having been closed by the Japanese, six Scout troops celebrated a rally outside of Vientiane in 1952. At the time, Lao Scouts leadership included Scout commissioner Captain Jean Deuve while members of parliament Pheng Phongsavan and Bong Souvannavong filled the positions of president and vice president. In Luang Prabang in early 1953, French Far East Ground Forces troops used local Scouts as auxiliaries in the first battle of Laos against communist forces. The Scouts prepared transport along the Nam Ou and Nam Suang rivers.

Homegrown Scouting was once again active in Laos, as Scouts Lao (Laotian: ສກຸດລາວ, pronounced skudlao) between its incorporation in 1959, at which date it numbered 2,300 Scouts. In 1975, the organization was dismantled by the new communist government of Pathet Lao who took over the country.

Laotian Scouting in exile existed at least into the early 1990s in Los Angeles and Birmingham. A small remnant persists in Sacramento and San Pablo, alongside fellow Vietnamese Scouting in exile and Cambodian Scouting in exile groups.

According to Eric Khoo Heng-Pheng of the World Organization of the Scout Movement, "We hope to work on (Laos and Burma) again... Laos is the closest, as we have got Cambodia in already... Just like Vietnam... we are working with them through ASEAN Scouting. We hope to enroll all the countries including China in (the Asia-Pacific Scout Region)."

As of 2016, a Girl Scout group has appeared in Vientiane at the Vientiane International School, and maintains a blog and Facebook presence.

The Scout Motto is ຕຣຽມພຣ້ອມ (Triam Phrom /tliaːm˨ pʰlɔːm˦˩/), Prepared in Lao, and Sois Prêt, Be Prepared in French.

== See also ==
- Cy Thao
