= Scouting and Guiding in Kiribati =

Scouting and Guiding associations in Kiribati

The Scout and Guide movement in Kiribati is served by

- The Girl Guides Association of Kiribati, member of the World Association of Girl Guides and Girl Scouts
- Kiribati Scout Association, member of the World Organization of the Scout Movement
