= Scouting and Guiding in Vietnam =

Scouting and Guiding in Vietnam is served by

- The Vietnamese Girl Scout Association, former member of the World Association of Girl Guides and Girl Scouts
- The Vietnamese Scout Association, former member of the World Organization of the Scout Movement
- Pathfinder Scouts Vietnam, member of World Organization of the Scout Movement since 2019

Vietnamese Scouting comes under the World Organization of the Scout Movement's Asia-Pacific Region. In 2010, the World Organization of the Scout Movement started new training courses for a fresh generation of Scout leaders for Vietnam. Vietnamese Scout Leaders take part in training events at the movements regional centre, Mount Makiling in the Philippines.

== See also ==
- Ho Chi Minh Young Pioneer Organization
