= Ho Chi Minh (disambiguation) =

Ho Chi Minh (Hồ Chí Minh) (1890–1969) was a Vietnamese communist leader.

Ho Chi Minh or Hồ Chí Minh may also refer to:

- Hồ Chí Minh City, the largest city in Vietnam
- Ho Chi Minh trail, logistical system used during the Vietnam War
- Ho Chi Minh Young Pioneer Organization, a communist youth organization
- Ho Chi Minh Communist Youth Union
- Ho Chi Minh Thought
- Hồ Chí Minh Prize
- Ho Chi Minh Highway
