= Asia Pacific Region (World Association of Girl Guides and Girl Scouts) =

WAGGGS divisional office in Asia Pacific Region

WAGGGS Asia Pacific Region

- Map of members or potential members of the WAGGGS-Asia Pacific Region; the countries with no Guiding organization, and those outside the Region, are in grey
- Country: 26 countries in Asia pacific Region
- Founded: 1969
- Membership: 2.5
- Website https://www.wagggs.org/en/our-world/asia-pacific-region/

The WAGGGS-Asia Pacific Region is the divisional office of the World Association of Girl Guides and Girl Scouts, headquartered in Makati, Philippines; Australia; and Japan. The WAGGGS-Asia Pacific Region services Guiding in the land area of Asia south of Russia-in-Asia and the bulk of the Pacific Basin.

All the formerly communist states of Central Asia and the Soviet Union have developed or are developing Guiding in the wake of the renaissance in the region. For several years, communism repressed Guiding in Afghanistan, where it has newly returned, as well as in Mongolia, which had been the first Soviet satellite state since 1924.

This region is the counterpart of the Asia-Pacific Region of the World Organization of the Scout Movement (WOSM). Post-soviet nations are divided between the WAGGGS-Europe Region and the WAGGGS-Asia Pacific Region.

== Member organisations ==
=== Founding members ===
Twelve member organizations (from Australia, New Zealand, India, Malaysia, South Korea, Japan, Thailand, Taiwan, Sri Lanka, Singapore, Philippines, and Pakistan) formed the original Asia Pacific Region in 1969.

=== Full list of member organisations ===
The year in the 'date joined' column refers to the year the organization was granted membership to the Asia Pacific Region of WAGGGS, not the year Guiding started in that country.

Country	Member Organisation	Date joined	Number of members (approximate)	Notes
Australia	Girl Guides Australia	Founding Member	30,000	
Bangladesh	Bangladesh Girl Guides Association (বাংলাদেশ গার্ল গাইড্‌স অ্যাসোসিয়েশন)	1973	50,000	
Brunei Darussalam	Girl Guides Association of Brunei Darussalam (Persatuan Pandu Puteri Brunei Darussalam (PPP))	1996	1,600	
Cambodia	Girl Guides Association of Cambodia (ខេមរៈកាយារិទ្ធិនារី, Khemarak Kayarith Neary)	2002	1,400	
Cook Islands	The Girl Guides Cook Islands Association	1993	1,100	
Fiji	Fiji Girl Guides Association	1981	1,800	
Hong Kong	Hong Kong Girl Guides Association (香港女童軍總會)	1978	55,000	
India	The Bharat Scouts and Guides (BSG, भारत स्काउट्स एवं गाइड्स)	Founding Member	1,300,000	Originally included present-day Bangladesh and Pakistan. BSG has a boys' section as well. The number of members here only includes their girl members.
Japan	Girl Scouts of Japan (ガールスカウト日本連盟 Gārusukauto Nippon Renmei)	Founding Member	61,000	
Kiribati	The Girl Guides Association of Kiribati	1990	450	
Korea (South)	Girl Scouts Korea (걸스카우트)	Founding Member	78,500	Co-educational group. Member numbers here only includes girls.
Malaysia	Persatuan Pandu Puteri Malaysia (PPPM, Girl Guides Malaysia)	Founding Member	74,000	
Maldives	Maldives Girl Guide Association (MGGA, ދިވެހިރާއްޖޭގެ ގާލްގައިޑް އެސޯސިއޭޝަން)	1994	7,500	
Mongolia	Girl Scout Association of Mongolia (Монголын Эмэгтэй Скаутын Холбоо, Mongoliyn Emegteǐ Scoutiyn Kholboo)	2005	1,050	newest member organisation
Nepal	Nepal Scouts (नेपाल स्काउट)	1984	20,000	Nepal Scouts has a boys' section as well. Numbers here include only girl members
New Zealand	GirlGuiding New Zealand (Ngā Kōhine Whakamahiri O Aotearoa	Founding member	11,000	
Pakistan	Pakistan Girl Guides Association (PGGA, پاکستان گرل گائڈزایسوسی ایشن)	Founding	118,000	
Papua New Guinea	Girl Guides Association of Papua New Guinea	1978	1,200	
Philippines	Girl Scouts of the Philippines (GSP)	Founding Member	671,000	
Singapore	Girl Guides Singapore (GGS, Pandu Puteri Singapura)	Founding Member	12,300	
Solomon Islands	The Girl Guides Association of the Solomon Islands	1987	700	
Sri Lanka	The Sri Lanka Girl Guides Association (SLGGA, Lanka Baladhakshika Samajaya, ශ්රී ලංකා බාළදක්ෂිකා සංගමය, இலங்கைப் மகளீர் சாரணர்க் கழகம்)	Founding Member	37,000	
Taiwan	Girl Scouts of China (中華民國台灣女童軍, Jhōnghuámínguó Táiwān Nyǔtóngjyūn, Zhōnghuámínguó Táiwān Nǚtóngjūn)	Founding Member	28,000	
Thailand	Girl Guides Association of Thailand (GGAT, สมาคมผู้บำเพ็ญประโยชน์แห่งประเทศไทย ในพระบรมราชินูปถัมภ์)	Founding Member	28,000	
Tonga	The Girl Guides Association of the Kingdom of Tonga	1987	200	
Vietnam	Vietnamese Scout Association (Hội Hướng Đạo Việt Nam (HĐVN))	not yet a member	unknown	working towards WAGGGS membership. Guiding/Scouting is forbidden under communist rule and VSA is a clandestine organisation.
