= Scouting and Guiding in Cambodia =

Scouting and Guiding Organizations in Cambodia

The Scout and Guide movement in Cambodia is served by two organizations:

- Girl Guides Association of Cambodia, member of the World Association of Girl Guides and Girl Scouts
- National Association of Cambodian Scouts, member of the World Organization of the Scout Movement

== History ==
Scouting and Guiding was introduced to Cambodia in the 1930s, when several independent organizations emerged. Under the Japanese occupation during World War II all Scouting and Guiding activities were banned. Scouting and Guiding was readmitted from 1945 to 1964, when it was replaced by the Jeunesse Socialiste Royale Khmer, a socialist youth movement. An effort to reestablish Scouting in 1972 lasted only until 1975, when it was banned again by the Khmer Rouge.

After 1990, several Scouting organizations were founded. They were merged in the coeducational National Association of Cambodian Scouts and the girls-only Girl Guides Association of Cambodia.

== Cambodian Scouting in exile ==
Cambodian Scouting in exile existed at least into the early 1990s in Los Angeles, alongside fellow Vietnamese Scouting in exile and Laotian Scouting in exile groups.

In 2008, a Cambodian troop of the Girl Scouts of the USA was started in Philadelphia.

== International Scout units in Cambodia ==
The French Association des Guides et Scouts d'Europe maintains one Scout troop in Phnom Penh for francophone youth, acting as a separate association under the name Scoutisme au Cambodge (i.e., Scouting in Cambodia).
