= Asia Pacific Region =

Asia Pacific Region can refer to:

- Asia-Pacific
- WOSM-Asia-Pacific Region
- WAGGGS-Asia Pacific Region
- Asia-Pacific Economic Cooperation
