= FIAS =

FIAS can refer to:

- Fédération Indochinoise des Associations du Scoutisme
- Federazione Italiana Attività Subacquee
- Fellow of the Islamic World Academy of Sciences (IAS)
- Frankfurt Institute for Advanced Studies
- Fédération Internationale Amateur de Sambo
- Frederick Irwin Anglican School
- Foreign Investment Advisory Service, a multi-donor service of the International Finance Corporation (IFC), a member of the World Bank Group.
- Farnborough International Airshow
