= Girl Guides Association of Cambodia =

- Girl Guides Association of Cambodia

- the new logo incorporates the initials KNK for Kayarith Neary Kompuchea
- Country: Cambodia
- Founded: 1996
- Membership: 4,551
- Patron: Norodom Monineath Sihanouk
- Affiliation: World Association of Girl Guides and Girl Scouts
- Website www.ggacambodia.org

The Girl Guides Association of Cambodia (Khmer:កាយប្ញទ្ធនារីកម្ពុជា, Kayarith Neary Kompuchea) is the national Guiding organization of Cambodia. It was founded in 1996 and became an associate member of the World Association of Girl Guides and Girl Scouts in 2002 and a full member in 2011. Membership stood at 4,551 as of 2012.

== History ==
Guiding was introduced to Cambodia before 1953, when the country was under the French Protectorate. In the 1950s, youth movements including the Guide and Scout Movements supported the country's religion, monarchy and community. Scouting and Guiding were banned in Cambodia during the Khmer Republic, the Democratic Kampuchea (Khmer Rouge regime) and the Vietnamese occupation.

In 1993 a reception was held in Manila, Philippines in conjunction with the World Association of Girl Guides and Girl Scouts' Asia Pacific Symposium of NGOs for Women in Development. The aim was to introduce or reintroduce the Girl Guiding/Girl Scouting movement and to explore possibilities of starting or restarting Girl Guiding and Girl Scouting in Cambodia, as well as Tibet, Iran, Russia, Uzbekistan and Vietnam. Fifty women leaders from those nations attended the Asia Pacific Symposium, sharing their Girl Guiding and Girl Scouting experiences.

The reorganization of the association was initiated by Leang Meng Ho in 1994, a former Girl Guide, who was at that time the Deputy Director of the Cambodian Institute of Human Rights.

In 1996 a group of sixteen young university students was given some exposure to Guiding by a staff member of the WAGGGS-Asia Pacific Region, a volunteer from France and trainers from Thailand and the Philippines. However, it was not until 1998 that the first national executive committee of the Girl Guides Association of Cambodia was formed. In August of that year, Cambodia received the WAGGGS Certificate of Country Working Towards Membership.

A quarterly newsletter is published in both the English and Khmer languages. The Girl Guides Association of Cambodia has a high profile in society and is well regarded, mainly due to the support of Queen mother Monineath who became patron of the association in 1999. Les Guides de France have been working with and supporting the Association.

Beginning in 2003, the association received several grants of the US Embassy in Phnom Penh amounting to 75,000 $ in 2006.

== Program ==
The association serves girls aged from seven to 18 years. The association is dedicated to helping and providing livelihood opportunities to poor girls and women through community-based education and training, rather than formal education in institutions like schools.

== See also ==
- Scouting and Guiding in Cambodia
