= Sherman L. Kiser =

Sherman Leo Kiser (31 Aug 1889, Huntington County, Indiana–24 Mar 1974, Fort Myers Beach, Lee, Florida) was a US Army officer. He is famous in Philippine Boy Scouting history as the founder of the defunct Lorillard Spencer Troop, an early Boy Scout Troop in the Philippines, and is mentioned in every account of Philippine Boy Scouts history.

== The Lorillard Spencer Troop ==
On 15 November 1914, 2nd Lieutenant Sherman Kiser, then a young US Army artillery officer with the Philippine Scouts at Pettit Barracks in Zamboanga City, organised the Lorillard Spencer Troop, named after Lorillard Suydam Spencer (1883–1939), (Note: son of Lorillard Spencer and father of Lorillard Suydam Spencer, Jr.,) member of the Officers of the National Council and Executive Board of the Boy Scouts of America (Cf: Scouting, Vol. I, No. 1, April 15, 1913, page 4), indirectly honoring Lorillard's mother Caroline Suydam Berryman Spencer, a wealthy widow who worked as a missionary on Mindanáo and provided money for the troop's Boy Scout uniforms. (Cf: The Telegraph Herald, Dubuque, Iowa, December 5, 1913.)

In 1915 the Boy Scouts of America magazine Boys' Life, Vol. V, No. 6, August 1915, page 21, reported: "Lieut. Kiser of the Philippine scouts in the American army has organized a troop of boy scouts in the town of Zamboango. The boys are keenly interested in scouting and put the scout law into action daily. They have cleaned up their village and have also taken hikes. These Moro scouts are the first boys of their race to show kindness to animals."

The Lorillard Spencer Troop was composed of: Ismula Sampang, Maha Isnani, Mejan Kaytan, Muhammad Sali Atima, Abubakar Atima, Abdurrahman Indasan Amping, Ali Gogo, Zakaharia Sampang, Muhammad Ali Sampang, Abubakar Tawpan, Akbar Muhammad, Juoh Tawpan, Ramon Inda, Illang Sarali, Jainal Taddah, Maliki Taddah, Usman Amping, Salikala Tunga, Anapi Uddi, Sabturai Isnani, Taijan Muhammad, Ering Sala, Bongso Maing, Sabturil Pio, Sahipa Hawi, Pangilan Abtahi.

Later, Takaki Ping and Alian Muhammad also joined the LST.

== Military career ==
Kiser, a career officer in the US Army served at the Battle of Bud Bagsak in 1913 under Gen. John Joseph Pershing. In 1914 to early 1915, Kiser was stationed at Augur Barracks on Jolo and Pettit Barracks in Zamboanga City. In 1915 to early 1916 he was assigned to coastal defenses (Manila, Subic Bay, Corregidor) and Camp Eldridge in Laguna. In middle 1916 he was back on Mindanáo at Ludlow Barracks. On 19 May 1917 he got promoted to first lieutenant.

As an artillery battalion commander in World War I, he received decorations from the US and France. In 1929 he graduated from the United States Army Command and General Staff College. On 14 March 1946, the 14th Major Port, the US Army unit Col. Kiser served as Port Commander, was honored by the Mayor and burghers of the Borough of Southampton in England – allowing them to march through the town "with bayonets fixed, drums beating, and colours flying" – for outstanding achievement in the operation of the Port of Southampton during World War II and on D-Day, the Allied invasion of Normandy. Later, Col. Kiser was also honored as a Commander of the Most Excellent Order of the British Empire (OBE) for his World War II service.

== Author ==
After retirement, Kiser authored The American Concept of Leadership and Americanism in Action. In 1955 he gifted a copy of The American Concept of Leadership, personally inscribed to US Secretary of Agriculture Ezra Taft Benson (later the President and Prophet of the Church of Jesus Christ of Latter-day Saints and Bronze Wolf awardee).

== Personal ==
Sherman Leo Kiser married Margaret V. Delabarre (14 Jun 1895, Conway, Massachusetts–18 Oct 1990, Green Valley, Prima, Arizona) on 20 October 1917 in San Francisco. They had a son, William Martin Kiser (9 Feb 1922, Washington DC–8 Jun 1993, Honolulu), a daughter, Janet D. Kiser Billington (b. 1928, Washington DC; living in Green Valley, Arizona), grandsons Robert Kiser and Richard Kiser, and granddaughters Ann Kiser, Katharine Billington, and Lucinda Billington.

== Legacy ==
- Photographs of Kiser in World War II are included in the Hack Miller Photograph Collection, 1930–1996 (Box 5, Folder 1, item 8 and item 14) at the University of Utah J. Willard Marriott Library Special Collections, Salt Lake City. (Mormon journalist Harold Guest "Hack" Miller of Deseret News had served in World War II under Kiser.) Presumably, Kiser's photographs of the Lorillard Spencer Troop (maintained in his scrapbook) would be in the possession of his familial descendants.
- Six surviving members of the Lorillard Spencer Troop were guests at the Boy Scouts of the Philippines Golden Jubilee Jamboree, celebrating the 50th anniversary of the founding of the Boy Scouts of America Philippine Islands Council No. 545 in 1973. They were: Abdurrahman Indasan Amping, Pangilan Abtahi, Alian Mohammad, Maha Isnani, Takaki Ping, and Abubakar Atima.
- In 2014, the Lorillard Spencer Troop centennial was celebrated with a "Philippine Scouting Centennial Jamboree" in three venues: Marikina (4–8 Nov), Cebu City (7–11 Nov), and Zamboanga City (8–12 Nov).

== Bibliography ==
- "Kiser's Sturdy Brown Boy Scouts of Moroland" in New York Tribune, February 21, 1915 .
- "Little Moros of the Boy Scouts Are Quick to Learn" in Christian Science Monitor, April 2, 1915.
- "The Moro Boy Scouts" in Outlook, October 20, 1915.
- Boy Scout Book, Volume 1, Manila: Boy Scouts of the Philippines, 1972.
- Diamond Jubilee Yearbook, Manila: Boy Scouts of the Philippines. ISBN 978-971-91769-0-9
- Kiser, Sherman, The American Concept of Leadership, New York: Pageant, 1954, 1955 ; Literary Licensing, 2012 . Digitised March 2006. ISBN 9781258381875.
- Kiser, Sherman, Americanism in Action: the way to economic and political stability, New York: Exposition, 1964. Digitized May 2011. ASIN: B0007E4UTQ
