= Tran Van Khac =

Trần Văn Khắc (right), founder of the Vietnamese Scouting Association, and Dr. Nguyễn Văn Thơ, former head of HĐVN, at the 2nd International Vietnamese Scouting Jamboree held in Toronto (1988)

Trần Văn Khắc (July 1, 1902 – May 24, 1994) is widely recognised as the founder of the Vietnamese Scouting movement in Vietnam in 1930 in Hanoi. He was a Secretary at Agriculture Department and an athlete. The Scout movement that he created (with help from Hoàng Đạo Thúy) was called Dong Tu Quan, and it had a focus on athletics as well as the standard Scouting activities. In 1932, Trần Văn Khắc went to live in Saigon (now Ho Chi Minh city), where he, Lương Thái, Huỳnh Văn Diệp, and Trần Con established the Cochinchinese Scout Association. Meanwhile, Hoàng Đạo Thúy led the Northern branch. In 1978, he left South Vietnam as Boat people to Pulau Bidong (Malaysia) until 1979 and was admitted to Canada as Refugee. He died in Ottawa in 1994.
