= Tonga branch of The Scout Association =

Scouting association in Tonga

- Country: Tonga
- Affiliation: The Scout Association

Tonga is one of 29 countries where Scouting exists (be it embryonic or widespread) but where there is no National Scout Organization. Scouting is active in Tonga as an overseas branch of The Scout Association, which allows Tonga to act as a member of the World Organization of the Scout Movement.

Unsuccessful attempts were made to start a local scout movement by August Hettig in 1920, and later by the Mormon Mission. The current Tongan scouting movement was established in 1952 by Prince Tungi, who was then serving as Minister of Education. The first troops were organised in 1953.

The membership badge of the Tonga branch of The Scout Association incorporates the crown from the coat of arms of Tonga.

== See also ==
- The Girl Guides Association of the Kingdom of Tonga
