= List of Scout Laws by country =

Scout Laws by country
- World Organization of the Scout Movement map

The following is a list of Scout Laws in national Scout and Guide organizations.

== Africa Scout Region ==
Africa Scout Region

=== South Africa ===
1. A Scout's honour is to be trusted
2. A Scout is loyal
3. A Scout's duty is to be useful and to help others.
4. A Scout is a friend to all and a brother / sister to every other Scout
5. A Scout is courteous
6. A Scout is a friend to animals
7. A Scout obeys orders
8. A Scout smiles and whistles under all difficulties
9. A Scout is thrifty
10. A Scout is clean in thought, word and deed

== Arab Scout Region ==
Arab Scout Region

=== Egypt ===
==== Egyptian Federation for Scouts and Girl Guides ====
1. A Scout's honour is to be trusted.
2. A Scout is loyal.
3. A Scout's duty is to be useful and to help others.
4. A Scout is a friend to all and a brother to every other Scout.
5. A Scout is courteous.
6. A Scout is a friend to animals.
7. A Scout obeys orders of his parents, Patrol Leader or Scoutmaster without question.
8. A Scout smiles and whistles under all difficulties.
9. A Scout is thrifty.
10. A Scout is clean in thought, word and deed

== Asia-Pacific Region ==
Asia-Pacific Region

=== Australia ===
==== Scouts Australia ====
1. Be Respectful
  Be friendly and considerate
  Care for others and the environment
2. Do What Is Right
  Be trustworthy, honest and fair
  Use resources wisely
3. Believe In Myself
  Learn from my experiences
  Face challenges with courage

==== Girl Guides Australia ====
As a Guide I will strive to:

1. Respect myself and others
2. Be considerate, honest and trustworthy
3. Be friendly to others
4. Make choices for a better world
5. Use my time and abilities wisely
6. Be thoughtful and optimistic
7. Live with courage and strength

=== Bangladesh ===
==== Bangladesh Scouts ====
English	স্কাউট আইন
1. A Scout's honour is to be trusted.; 2. A Scout is a friend to all.; 3. A Scout is courteous and obedient.; 4. A Scout is kind to animals.; 5. A Scout is cheerful at all times.; 6. A Scout is thrifty.; 7. A Scout is clean in thought, word and deed.	১. স্কাউট আত্মমর্যাদায় বিশ্বসী; ২. স্কাউট সকলের বন্ধু; ৩. স্কাউট বিনয়ী ও অনুগত; ৪. স্কাউট জীবের প্রতি সদয়; ৫. স্কাউট সদা প্রফুল্ল; ৬. স্কাউট মিতব্যয়ী; ৭. স্কাউট চিন্তা, কথা ও কাজে নির্মল

=== Hong Kong ===
1. A Scout is to be trusted.
2. A Scout is loyal.
3. A Scout is friendly and considerate.
4. A Scout belongs to the world-wide family of Scouts.
5. A Scout has courage in all difficulties.
6. A Scout makes good use of time and is careful of possessions and property.
7. A Scout has self-respect and respect for others.

=== India ===
1. A Scout/Guide is trustworthy
2. A Scout/Guide is loyal
3. A Scout/Guide is a friend to all and a brother/sister to every other Scout/Guide.
4. A Scout/Guide is courteous
5. A Scout/Guide is a friend to animals and loves nature.
6. A Scout/Guide is disciplined and helps protect public property.
7. A Scout/Guide is courageous.
8. A Scout/Guide is thrifty.
9. A Scout/Guide is pure in thought, word and deed.

=== Indonesia ===
1. Believe in God the Almighty
2. Preserve nature and love each other
3. Be an affable and knightly patriot
4. Be obedient and collegial
5. Help others with compliance and resilience
6. Be diligent, skilled and cheerful
7. Be provident and simple
8. Exercise discipline, be brave and faithful
9. Be accountable and trustworthy
10. Have purity in mind, word and act

=== Japan ===
==== Scout Association of Japan ====
English	Japanese
1. A Scout is faithful.; 2. A Scout is friendly.; 3. A Scout is courteous.; 4. A Scout is kind.; 5. A Scout is cheerful.; 6. A Scout is thrifty.; 7. A Scout is courageous.; 8. A Scout is thankful.	1. スカウトは誠実である。; 2. スカウトは友情にあつい。; 3. スカウトは礼儀正しい。; 4. スカウトは親切である。; 5. スカウトは快活である。; 6. スカウトは質素である。; 7. スカウトは勇敢である。; 8. スカウトは感謝の心をもつ。

==== Girl Scouts of Japan ====
English	Japanese
1. I am cheerful and courageous at all times.; 2. I respect all living things.; 3. I am a friend to all, and a sister to every Girl Scout.; 4. I am courteous.; 5. I use time and resources wisely.; 6. I think and act on my own.; 7. I am responsible for what I say and do.; 8. I try to be sincere.	1. 私はいつも明るく、勇気をもちます。; 2. 私はいのちあるものを大切にします。; 3. 私はすべての人の友達となり、他のガールスカウトとは姉妹です。; 4. 私は礼儀を正しくします。; 5. 私は時間と資源を大切に使います。; 6. 私は自分で考え行動します。; 7. 私は言葉と行いに責任をもちます。; 8. 私は誠実であるように努めます。

=== Malaysia ===
==== Persekutuan Pengakap Malaysia ====
English	Bahasa Melayu
1. A Scout's honour is to be trusted 2. A Scout is loyal towards the King and other rulers, towards the Scout Masters, parents, employer and the people under him.; 3. A Scout is to make himself useful and helpful at all times.; 4. A Scout is a friend to all of any States, rank or any other religion.; 5. A Scout is good and kind and will always do good.; 6. A Scout is good and kind to animals.; 7. A Scout always follow his parents', Leaders' orders without any questions.; 8. A Scout is always patient and smile during difficulties.; 9. A Scout is thrifty.; 10. A Scout is clean and pure of thoughts, words and actions.	1. Pengakap adalah seorang yang sentiasa dipercayai maruah dan kehormatan dirinya.; 2. Pengakap adalah seorang yang taat kepada Yang Dipertuan Agong, Raja-raja, pemimpin-pemimpin, ibu bapanya, majikannya dan orang-orang dibawahnya.; 3. Pengakap adalah wajib menjadikan dirinya berguna dan menolong pada setiap masa.; 4. Pengakap adalah sahabat kepada sekalian orang dan saudara kepada lain-lain Pengakap walau apa negeri, pangkat dan agamanya sekalipun.; 5. Pengakap adalah seorang yang baik dan sempurna budi pekertinya dan sentiasa berbudi.; 6. Pengakap adalah baik dan kasih kepada segala binatang.; 7. Pengakap adalah seorang yang sentiasa menurut perintah dan suruhan ibu bapanya, Ketua Patrolnya atau Pemimpin-pemimpin Pengakapnya dengan tanpa apa-apa soalan.; 8. Pengakap adalah seorang yang sentiasa bersabar dan manis mukanya dalam masa kesusahan.; 9. Pengakap adalah seorang yang jimat dan cermat.; 10. Pengakap adalah bersih dan suci fikirannya, perkataannya dan perbuatannya.

==== Persatuan Pandu Puteri Malaysia ====
English	Bahasa Melayu
1. A Guide's honour is to be trusted.; 2. A Guide is loyal.; 3. A Guides's duty is to be useful and help others.; 4. A Guide is friend to all and a sister to every other guide.; 5. A Guide is courteous.; 6. A Guide is a friend to animals and care for all living things.; 7. A Guide obey orders.; 8. A Guide smiles and sings under all difficulties.; 9. A Guide is thrifty.; 10. A Guide is pure in thought, word and in deed.	

=== New Zealand ===
==== New Zealand ====
1. "Have Respect" - For yourself and others – For the environment
2. "Do What Is Right" - Be Trustworthy and Tolerant – Have integrity
3. "Be Positive" - Accept challenges with courage – Be a friend to all

The New Zealand Scout Law changed in 2015 with approval from WOSM.

=== Philippines ===
==== Boy Scouts of the Philippines ====
The BSP's initial Scout Law was exactly identical to that of the USA's and was adopted in 1923. This version remained unchanged until 1976 when the BSP was restructured as the KSP under the Marcos administration. After the removal of Pres. Marcos in 1986, the BSP's Scout Law was restored in its original form:

The Scout Law	Ang Batás ng Scout
A Scout is	Ang Scout ay
1. Trustworthy; 2. Loyal; 3. Helpful; 4. Friendly; 5. Courteous; 6. Kind; 7. Obedient; 8. Cheerful; 9. Thrifty; 10. Brave; 11. Clean, and 12. Reverent	1. Mapagkakatiwalaan; 2. Matapát; 3. Matulungín; 4. Mapagkaibigan; 5. Magalang; 6. Mabaít; 7. Masunurin; 8. Masayá; 9. Matipíd; 10. Matapang; 11. Malinis, at 12. Maka-Diyós

==== Kapatirang Scout ng Pilipinas ====
This was the Scout Law of Service Scouts and Community Scouts in the KSP, 1976–1986.

The Scout Law	Ang Batás ng Scout
A Scout is	Ang Scout ay
1. Trustworthy; 2. Loyal; 3. Helpful; 4. Considerate; 5. Courageous; 6. Resourceful; 7. Industrious; 8. Disciplined; 9. Self-reliant; 10. and a Brother to all Scouts.	1. Mapagkakatiwalaan; 2. Matapát; 3. Magiliw; 4. Mapagbigáy; 5. Magiting; 6. Maparaán; 7. Masipag; 8. Matuwíd; 9. May tiwalà sa sarili 10. At kapatíd ng lahát ng Scouts.

==== Girl Scouts of the Philippines ====
The Girl Scout Law

1. A Girl Scout's honor is to be trusted.; 2. A Girl Scout is loyal.; 3. A Girl Scout is helpful.; 4. A Girl Scout is a friend to all and a sister to every other Girl Scout.; 5. A Girl Scout is courteous.; 6. A Girl Scout respects all living things.; 7. A Girl Scout is disciplined.; 8. A Girl Scout is self-reliant.; 9. A Girl Scout is thrifty.; 10. A Girl Scout is clean in thought, words, and deeds.	1. Ang Girl Scout ay mapagkakatiwalaan.; 2. Ang Girl Scout ay matapát.; 3. Ang Girl Scout ay matulungín.; 4. Ang Girl Scout ay kaibigan ng lahát at kapatíd ng bawat Girl Scout.; 5. Ang Girl Scout ay mapitagan.; 6. Ang Girl Scout ay magalang sa lahát na may buhay.; 7. Ang Girl Scout ay disiplinado.; 8. Ang Girl Scout ay may sariling paninindigan.; 9. Ang Girl Scout ay matipíd.; 10. Ang Girl Scout ay malinis sa isip, sa salitâ at sa gawâ.

=== Singapore ===
==== The Singapore Scout Association ====
1. A Scout is to be trusted
2. A Scout is loyal
3. A Scout makes friends, establishes and maintains harmonious relations
4. A Scout is disciplined and considerate
5. A Scout has courage in all difficulties.
1. A Guide is polite, considerate and respects her elders
2. A Guide is friendly and a sister to all Guides
3. A Guide is kind to all living things
4. A Guide is obedient
5. A Guide has courage and is cheerful in all difficulties
6. A Guide takes care of her own possessions and those of other people
7. A Guide is thrifty and diligent
8. A Guide is self-disciplined in what she thinks, says and does

=== Sri Lanka ===
==== Sri Lanka Scout Association ====
1. Scout is trustworthy
2. Scout is loyal
3. Scout is friendly and considerate
4. Scout is brother to every other Scout
5. Scout is courageous
6. Scout is kind to animals
7. Scout is cooperative
8. Scout is cheerful
9. Scout is thrifty
10. Scout is clean in thought, word and deed

=== Taiwan ===
==== Scouts of China ====
Beaver Scouts
Love cleaning and be polite.	Chinese: 愛乾淨，有禮貌。
Cub Scouts
Obey the seniors, help other people, never tell the lies, and don't be afraid of difficult.	Chinese: 服從長上，幫助他人，不說謊話，不怕困難。
Scouts above
1. Honest; 2. Loyal and Respectful; 3. Helpful; 4. Loving and Kind; 5. Courteous; 6. Just; 7. Responsible; 8. Cheerful; 9. Prudent; 10. Courageous; 11. Clean; 12. Socially Responsible	Traditional Chinese: 1. 誠實：為人之道，首在誠實；無論做事、說話、居心，均須真實不欺。; 2. 忠孝：對國家須盡忠，對父母應盡孝。; 3. 助人：盡己之力，扶助他人，每日至少行一善事，不受酬，不居功。; 4. 仁愛：待朋友須親愛，待眾人須和善；對生命要尊重，對社會要關心，對大自然要維護。; 5. 禮節：對人須有禮貌；凡應對進退，圴應合乎規矩。; 6. 公平：明事理、辨是非，待人公正，處事和平。; 7. 負責：信守承諾，克盡職責，遵守團體紀律，服從國家法令。; 8. 快樂：心常愉快，時露笑容；無論遇何困難，圴應處之泰然。; 9. 勤儉：好學力行，刻苦耐勞，不浪費時間，不妄用金錢。; 10. 勇敢：義所當為，毅然為之；不為利誘，不為威屈，成敗在所不計。; 11. 整潔：身體、服裝、住所、用具須整齊清潔；言語須謹慎，心地須光明。; 12. 公德：愛惜公物，重視環保，勿因個人便利，妨害公眾。

=== Thailand ===
==== Thai Scout Organization ====
Thai: ด้วยเกียรติของข้า ข้าสัญญาว่า
ข้อ 1. ข้าจะจงรักภักดีต่อชาติ ศาสนา พระมหากษัตริย์
ข้อ 2. ข้าจะช่วยเหลือผู้อื่นทุกเมื่อ
ข้อ 3. ข้าจะปฏิบัติตามกฎของลูกเสือ

In the Name of Honor, I Promise.
One, I will Be respectful to nation, religion and the monarch.
Two, I will always to be helpful to others.
Three, I will obey the rules of the Boy Scouts.

English	Thai
1. A Scout's honour is to be trusted 2. A Scout is respectful to nation, religion and the monarch.; 3. A Scout's duty is to be useful and to help each other's # A Scout is friend to all, and a brother to every other scout 4. A Scout is courteous 5. A Scout is a friend to animals 6. A Scout obeys orders of the father and mother, and the commander with an honor 7. A Scout smiles and whistles under all difficulties 8. A Scout is thrifty 9. A Scout is clean in thought, word and deed	1. ลูกเสือมีเกียรติเชื่อถือได้; 2. ลูกเสือมีความจงรักภักดีต่อชาติ ศาสนา และพระมหากษัตริย์; 3. ลูกเสือมีหน้าที่กระทำตนให้เป็นประโยชน์และช่วยเหลือผู้อื่นทุกเมื่อ; 4. ลูกเสือเป็นมิตรของคนทุกคนและเป็นพี่น้องกับลูกเสือทั่วโลก; 5. ลูกเสือเป็นผู้สุภาพเรียบร้อย; 6. ลูกเสือมีความเมตตากรุณาต่อสัตว์; 7. ลูกเสือเชื่อฟังคำสั่งของบิดามารดาและผู้บังคับบัญชาด้วยความเคารพ; 8. ลูกเสือมีใจร่าเริงและไม่ย่อท้อต่อความลำบาก; 9. ลูกเสือเป็นผู้มัธยัสถ์; 10. ลูกเสือประพฤติชอบด้วยกาย วาจา ใจ

== European Scout Region ==
European Scout Region

=== Austria (Österreich) ===
Pfadfinder und Pfadfinderinnen Österreichs (PPÖ)

Der Pfadfinder...

1. ... sucht den Weg zu Gott. (Spirituelles Leben)

2. ... ist treu und hilft wo er kann. (Verantwortungsbewusstes Leben in der Gemeinschaft)

3. ... achtet alle Menschen und versucht sie zu verstehen. (Weltweite Verbundenheit)

4. ... überlegt, entscheidet und handelt danach. (Kritische Auseinandersetzung mit sich selbst und der Umwelt)

5. ... führt ein einfaches Leben und schützt die Natur. (Einfaches Naturverbundenes Leben)

6. ... ist fröhlich und unverzagt. (Bereitschaft zum Abenteuer des Lebens)

7. ... nützt seine Fähigkeiten. (Schöpferisches Tun)

8. ... führt ein gesundes Leben. (Körperbewusstes und gesundes Leben)

=== Croatia ===
==== Savez izviđača Hrvatske ====
English	Croatian
1. A Scout has honor and courage 2. A Scout is hardworking and trustworthy 3. A Scout listens and reasons 4. A Scout learns and acts 5. A Scout seeks and believes 6. A Scout is cheerful and sociable 7. A Scout is loyal and selfless 8. A Scout loves and appreciates 9. A Scout cares and safeguards 10. A Scout serves and leads	1. Izviđač je častan i hrabar 2. Izviđač je vrijedan i pouzdan 3. Izviđač sluša i promišlja 4. Izviđač uči i djeluje 5. Izviđač traga i vjeruje 6. Izviđač je vedar i društven 7. Izviđač je odan i nesebičan 8. Izviđač voli i cijeni 9. Izviđač brine i čuva 10. Izviđač služi i vodi

=== Czech Republic ===
English	Czech
1. A Scout speaks the truth 2. A Scout can be trusted and is loyal 3. A Scout is useful to society and helps others 4. A Scout is a friend to all people of good will and a brother/sister to all Scouts and Guides; 5. A Scout is courteous 6. A Scout protects nature and valuable human products 7. A Scout obeys his/her parents, superiors and Scout/Guide leaders 8. A Scout is of cheerful mind 9. A Scout is thrifty 10. A Scout is pure in thought, word and deeds	1. Skaut je pravdomluvný 2. Skaut je věrný a oddaný 3. Skaut je prospěšný a pomáhá jiným 4. Skaut je přítelem všech lidí dobré vůle a bratrem každého skauta 5. Skaut je zdvořilý 6. Skaut je ochráncem přírody a cenných výtvorů lidských 7. Skaut je poslušný rodičů, představených a vůdců 8. Skaut je veselé mysli 9. Skaut je hospodárný 10. Skaut je čistý v myšlenkách, slovech i skutcích

=== Denmark ===
==== Baden-Powell Scouts' Association ====
English	Danish
1. A Scout is reliable 2. A Scout is helpful and a good friend 3. A Scout is kind to animals 4. A Scout faces difficulties in good spirits 5. A Scout is clean in thought, word and deed	1. En spejder er til at stole på 2. En spejder er hjælpsom og en god kammerat 3. En spejder er god mod dyr 4. En spejder tager vanskeligheder med godt humør 5. En spejder er ren i tanke, ord og handling

==== KFUM-Spejderne i Danmark ====
English	Danish
1. A Scout listens to the word of God; 2. A Scout is helpful 3. A Scout respects others 4. A Scout protects and guards nature 5. A Scout is trustworthy 6. A Scout takes responsibility 7. A Scout finds their own opinion	1. En spejder lytter til guds ord 2. En spejder er hjælpsom 3. En spejder respekterer andre 4. En spejder værner om naturen 5. En spejder er til at stole på 6. En spejder tager medansvar 7. En spejder finder sin egen mening

==== DDS – Det Danske Spejderkorps ====
English	Danish
Whoever is in the Scouts' community does their best to: 1. Find their own faith and respect that of others 2. Safeguard nature 3. Be a good friend 4. Be considerate and help others 5. Be trustworthy 6. Hear others' opinions and make his/her own 7. Take responsibility in family and society	Den der er med i spejdernes fællesskab gør sit bedste for: 1. At finde sin egen tro og respektere andres 2. At værne om naturen 3. At være en god kammerat 4. At være hensynsfuld og hjælpe andre 5. At være til at stole på 6. At høre andres meninger og danne sine egne 7. At tage medansvar i familie og samfund

=== Finland ===
==== The Guides and Scouts of Finland ====
The Ideals of a Scout are

1. To respect others
2. To love and protect the environment
3. To be reliable
4. To build friendship across boundaries
5. To feel one's responsibility and to take action
6. To develop oneself as a human being
7. To search for truth in life

=== Germany ===
==== Deutsche Pfadfinderschaft Sankt Georg ====
English	German
Scouts' Law	Gesetz
As a Girl Scout ... As a Boy Scout ...: 1. ... I meet everybody with respect. All Scouts are my brothers and sisters.; 2. ... I go through the world confidently.; 3. ... I am courteous and helpful wherever this is necessary.; 4. ... I shall not do things just by halves and shall not give up, even in difficult situations.; 5. ... I shall develop my own opinion and stand by it.; 6. ... I shall say what I think and do what I say.; 7. ... I shall live modestly and in an environmental conscious manner.; 8. ... I shall stand by my origins and my faith.	Als Pfadfinderin ... Als Pfadfinder ...: 1. ... begegne ich allen Menschen mit Respekt und habe alle Pfadfinderinnen und Pfadfinder als Geschwister.; 2. ... gehe ich zuversichtlich und mit wachen Augen durch die Welt.; 3. ... bin ich höflich und helfe da, wo es notwendig ist.; 4. ... mache ich nichts halb und gebe auch in Schwierigkeiten nicht auf.; 5. ... entwickle ich eine eigene Meinung und stehe für diese ein.; 6. ... sage ich, was ich denke, und tue, was ich sage.; 7. ... lebe ich einfach und umweltbewusst.; 8. ... stehe ich zu meiner Herkunft und zu meinem Glauben.

==== Pfadfinderbund Weltenbummler ====
English	German
1. A Scout is chivalrous 2. A Scout is reliable 3. A Scout is true and faithful 4. A Scout is ready to help at every time 5. A Scout is brother to all Boy Scouts and Girl Scouts in the world and friend of each and every human 6. A Scout is always of good cheer 7. A Scout is simple and thrifty 8. A Scout is pure in thought, word and deed 9. A Scout protects plants and animals 10. A Scout obeys on free will	1. Ein Pfadfinder ist ritterlich 2. Ein Pfadfinder ist zuverlässig 3. Ein Pfadfinder ist treu und gottesfürchtig 4. Ein Pfadfinder ist jederzeit hilfsbereit 5. Ein Pfadfinder ist Bruder aller Pfadfinder und Pfadfinderinnen und Freund aller Menschen; 6. Ein Pfadfinder ist immer frohen Mutes; 7. Ein Pfadfinder ist einfach und sparsam 8. Ein Pfadfinder ist rein in Gedanken, Worten und Werken; 9. Ein Pfadfinder schützt Pflanzen und Tiere; 10. Ein Pfadfinder gehorcht aus freiem Willen

=== Hungary ===
==== Magyar Cserkészszövetség ====
1. A Scout is upright and always tells the truth.
2. A Scout does his/her duties to God, his/her Country and his/her fellow people.
3. A Scout helps whenever he/she can.
4. A Scout is a brother/sister to all Scouts.
5. A Scout is gentle with others, but strict to him/herself.
6. A Scout loves nature, is kind to animals and takes care of plants.
7. A Scout obeys his superiors willingly and wholeheartedly
8. A Scout is cheerful and considerate.
9. A Scout is thrifty.
10. A Scout is clean in body and soul

=== Iceland ===
1. A Scout is helpful
2. A Scout is cheerful
3. A Scout is loyal
4. A Scout is a friend of the nature
5. A Scout is considerate
6. A Scout is modest
7. A Scout is cooperative
8. A Scout is thrifty
9. A Scout is respectful
10. A Scout is independent

=== Ireland ===
==== Gasóga na hÉireann ====
1. A Scout is to be trusted.
2. A Scout is loyal.
3. A Scout is helpful and considerate to all.
4. A Scout has courage in all difficulties.
5. A Scout makes good use of time and is careful of possessions and property.
6. A Scout has respect for self and others.
7. A Scout respects nature and the environment

==== Scouting Ireland (CSI) ====
1. A Scout is loyal
2. A Scout is trustworthy
3. A Scout is helpful
4. A Scout is friendly
5. A Scout is courteous
6. A Scout is kind
7. A Scout is obedient
8. A Scout is cheerful
9. A Scout is thrifty
10. A Scout is brave
11. A Scout is pure in thought, word and deed
12. A Scout does all for the glory of God

=== Israel ===
==== Hebrew Scouts Movement in Israel ====
1. A Scout speaks the truth
2. A Scout is loyal to his people and his country and language
3. A Scout is useful member in society, loves work and helping others
4. A Scout is a friend of every person and brother of every Scout
5. A Scout is polite
6. A Scout loves plant and animal life and protects it
7. A Scout is a disciplined man
8. A Scout's spirit does not fall
9. A Scout is a frugal person
10. A Scout is clean in words and deeds

=== Italy ===
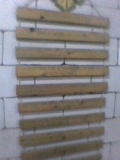
Legge scout

==== Scouting for Boys ====
English	Italian
This is how the original Scout Law was translated in the Italian edition of "Scouting for Boys" (Scautismo per Ragazzi). Every association in Italy made its own version of the Scout Law, keeping the original spirit.
1. A Scout's honour is to be trusted.; 2. A Scout is loyal to the King, his country, his officers, his parents, his employers, and those under him.; 3. A Scout's duty is to be useful and to help others.; 4. A Scout is a friend to all, and a brother to every other Scout, no matter to what social class the other belongs.; 5. A Scout is courteous.; 6. A Scout is a friend to animals.; 7. A Scout obeys orders of his parents, patrol leader or Scoutmaster without question.; 8. A Scout smiles and whistles under all difficulties.; 9. A Scout is thrifty.; 10. A Scout is clean in thought, word and deed.	1. L'onore di uno Scout è di essere creduto.; 2. Lo Scout è fedele: al Re, alla Patria, ai suoi Capi, ai suoi genitori, ai suoi datori di lavoro e ai suoi sottoposti.; 3. Il dovere di uno Scout è di essere utile e aiutare gli altri.; 4. Lo Scout è amico di tutti e fratello di ogni altro Scout, a prescindere dalla classe sociale di appartenenza.; 5. Lo Scout è cortese.; 6. Lo Scout è un amico per gli animali.; 7. Lo Scout ubbidisce agli ordini dei suoi genitori, del Capo Pattuglia o del suo Capo senza replicare.; 8. Lo Scout sorride e fischietta in tutte le difficoltà.; 9. Lo Scout è economo.; 10. Lo Scout è pulito nel pensiero, nella parola e nell'azione.

=== Latvia ===
English	Latvian
1. A Scout is trustworthy 2. A Scout is loyal to the fatherland 3. A Scout is selfless and helpful 4. A Scout is friendly and tolerant 5. A Scout is courteous 6. A Scout is Nature's friend 7. A Scout is obedient 8. A Scout is cheerful in hardships 9. A Scout is hard-working and thrifty 10. A Scout is clean in thoughts, words, and deeds	1. Skauts ir patiess 2. Skauts ir uzticīgs Tēvijai; 3. Skauts ir pašaizliedzīgs un palīdzīgs 4. Skauts ir draudzīgs un iecietīgs 5. Skauts ir pieklājīgs 6. Skauts ir dabas draugs 7. Skauts ir paklausīgs 8. Skauts ir možs grūtībās 9. Skauts ir darbīgs un taupīgs 10. Skauts ir tīrs domās, vārdos un darbos.

=== Malta ===
==== The Scout Association of Malta ====
1. A Scout is to be trusted.
2. A Scout is loyal.
3. A Scout is friendly and considerate.
4. A Scout is a brother to all Scouts.
5. A Scout has courage in all difficulties.
6. A Scout makes good use of his time and is careful of possessions and property.
7. A Scout has respect for himself and for others.
8. A Scout is clean in thought, word and deed.

=== Netherlands ===
English	Dutch
1. A Scout ventures out into the world 2. together with others to explore the world around him / her 3. and to make it a better place to live in.; 4. He / she is honest, loyal and will persevere.; 5. He / She is value-conscious and cares for nature.; 6. He / She respects him / herself and others.	1. Een scout trekt er samen met anderen op uit 2. om de wereld om zich heen te ontdekken 3. en deze meer leefbaar te maken.; 4. Hij / zij is eerlijk, trouw en houdt vol.; 5. Hij / zij is waardebewust en zorgt goed voor de natuur.; 6. Hij / zij respecteert zichzelf en anderen.

==== Traditional groups ====
1. A Scout is honest.
2. A Scout is loyal.
3. A Scout is helpful.
4. A Scout is brother for other Scouts.
5. A Scout is kind and sportive.
6. A Scout has care for nature.
7. A Scout knows how to obey.
8. A Scout continues.
9. A Scout is thrifty.
10. A Scout has respect for himself and all others.

=== Norway ===
==== Norwegian Guide and Scout Association ====
1. A Scout seeks his faith and respect others beliefs;
2. A Scout accepts responsibility for him/herself and others;
3. A Scout is helpful and considerate;
4. A Scout is a good friend;
5. A Scout is honest and trustworthy;
6. A Scout knows the nature and protects it;
7. A Scout thinks and acts independently, and tries to understand other people;
8. A Scout does his/her best in difficulties and troubles;
9. A Scout is thrifty;
10. A Scout works for peace and understanding between people.

==== YWCA-YMCA Guides and Scouts of Norway ====
1. A Scout is open to God;
2. A Scout is a good friend;
3. A Scout know and care for the nature;
4. A Scout is trustworthy;
5. A Scout is thrifty;
6. A Scout works for peace;
7. A Scout takes responsibility and shows the way;

=== Poland ===
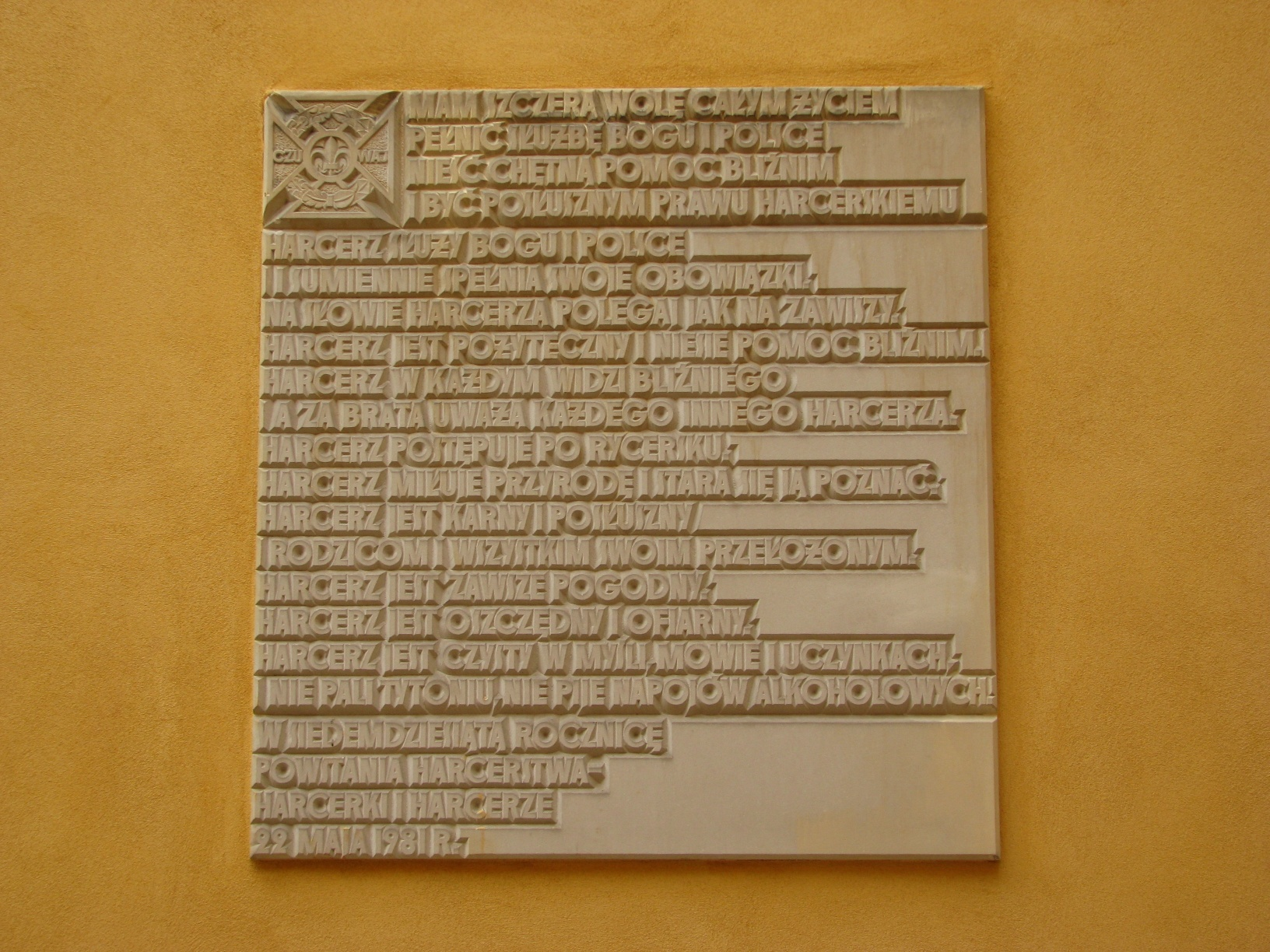
Polish Scout Law - St. Martin's church in Warsaw, Poland

==== Związek Harcerstwa Polskiego ====
English	Polish
1. A Scout/Guide conscientiously fulfils the duties stemming from the Scout and Guide Promise.; 2. A Scout's/Guide's word is to be trusted like that of Zawisza the Knight.; 3. A Scout/Guide is useful and helps others.; 4. A Scout/Guide is a friend to everybody and a brother/sister to every other Scout/Guide.; 5. A Scout/Guide acts chivalrously.; 6. A Scout/Guide loves Nature and tries to get to know it.; 7. A Scout/Guide is well disciplined and obedient to his/her parents and superiors.; 8. A Scout/Guide is always cheerful.; 9. A Scout/Guide is thrifty and generous.; 10. A Scout/Guide works on himself, he/she is pure in thought, in word and in deed; he/she is free from addictions.	Prawo Harcerskie: 1. Harcerz sumiennie spełnia swoje obowiązki wynikające z Przyrzeczenia Harcerskiego.; 2. Na słowie harcerza polegaj jak na Zawiszy.; 3. Harcerz jest pożyteczny i niesie pomoc bliźnim.; 4. Harcerz w każdym widzi bliźniego, a za brata uważa każdego innego harcerza.; 5. Harcerz postępuje po rycersku.; 6. Harcerz miłuje przyrodę i stara się ją poznać.; 7. Harcerz jest karny i posłuszny rodzicom oraz wszystkim swoim przełożonym.; 8. Harcerz jest zawsze pogodny.; 9. Harcerz jest oszczędny i ofiarny.; 10. Harcerz pracuje nad sobą, jest czysty w myśli, mowie i uczynkach; jest wolny od nałogów.

==== Scouting Association of the Republic ====
English	Polish
1. A Guide / Scout serves God and Poland, and conscientiously does his/her duties.; 2. One can trust the words of a Girl Guide / Boy Scout like those of Zawisza.; 3. A Guide / Scout is useful and helps other people.; 4. A Guide / Scout recognizes anyone as fellow-man and treats each Guide/Scout as a brother/sister.; 5. A Guide / Scout behaves in a chivalrous way.; 6. A Guide / Scout loves nature and tries to get to know.; 7. A Guide / Scout is disciplined to the parents and all her/his superiors.; 8. A Guide / Scout is always good-humoured.; 9. A Guide / Scout is able to save and is generous.; 10. A Guide / Scout is clear in her/his thoughts, in her/his words and in her/his deeds; she/he does not smoke or drink alcohol.	Prawo Harcerskie: 1. Harcerz służy Bogu i Polsce i sumiennie spełnia swoje obowiązki.; 2. Na słowie harcerza polegaj jak na Zawiszy.; 3. Harcerz jest pożyteczny i niesie pomoc bliźnim.; 4. Harcerz w każdym widzi bliźniego, a za brata uważa każdego innego harcerza.; 5. Harcerz postępuje po rycersku.; 6. Harcerz miłuje przyrodę i stara się ją poznać.; 7. Harcerz jest karny i posłuszny rodzicom i wszystkim swoim przełożonym.; 8. Harcerz jest zawsze pogodny.; 9. Harcerz jest oszczędny i ofiarny.; 10. Harcerz jest czysty w myśli, mowie i uczynkach, nie pali tytoniu i nie pije napojów alkoholowych.

=== Portugal ===
==== Associação dos Escoteiros de Portugal ====
English	Portuguese
1. A Scout speaks the truth and his word is sacred.; 2. A Scout is loyal.; 3. A Scout is helpful.; 4. A Scout is a friend to everybody and a brother to all Scouts.; 5. A Scout is courteous.; 6. A Scout is respectful and protector of Nature.; 7. A Scout is responsible and disciplined.; 8. A Scout is joyful and smiles in the face of difficulties.; 9. A Scout is thrifty, sober and respects other people's belongings.; 10. A Scout is pure in thought, word and deeds.	1. O Escoteiro é verdadeiro e a sua palavra é sagrada.; 2. O Escoteiro é leal.; 3. O Escoteiro é prestável.; 4. O Escoteiro é amigo de todos e irmão dos demais Escoteiros.; 5. O Escoteiro é cortês.; 6. O Escoteiro é respeitador e protector da Natureza.; 7. O Escoteiro é responsável e disciplinado.; 8. O Escoteiro é alegre e sorri perante as dificuldades.; 9. O Escoteiro é económico, sóbrio e respeitador dos bens de outrem.; 10. O Escoteiro é íntegro nos pensamentos, palavras e acções.

==== Corpo Nacional de Escutas ====
English	Portuguese
1. A Scout's honour is to be trusted.; 2. A Scout is loyal.; 3. A Scout is useful and practices a good deed daily.; 4. A Scout is a friend to everybody and a brother to other Scouts.; 5. A Scout is sensitive and respectful.; 6. A Scout protects the plants and animals.; 7. A Scout is obedient.; 8. A Scout is always of good humor.; 9. A Scout is sober, thrifty and respects the possessions of others.; 10. A Scout is pure in thoughts, words and deeds.	1. A honra do Escuta inspira confiança.; 2. O Escuta é leal.; 3. O Escuta é útil e pratica diariamente uma boa acção.; 4. O Escuta é amigo de todos e irmão de todos os outros Escutas.; 5. O Escuta é delicado e respeitador.; 6. O Escuta protege as plantas e os animais.; 7. O Escuta é obediente.; 8. O Escuta tem sempre boa disposição de espírito.; 9. O Escuta é sóbrio, económico e respeitador do bem alheio.; 10. O Escuta é puro nos pensamentos, nas palavras e nas acções.

=== Slovenia ===
==== Slovenian Catholic Girl Guides and Boy Scouts Association ====
1. A Scout's honor is to be trusted.
2. A Scout is loyal to God and homeland.
3. A Scout helps others and does at least one good turn every day.
4. A Scout is a friend to all and sister/brother to every other Scout.
5. A Scout is courteous.
6. A Scout respects nature and seeing in it the work of God.
7. A Scout obeys her/his parents and superiors and conscientiously performs her/his duties.
8. A Scout whistles and sings in difficulties.
9. A Scout is hard-working and thrifty.
10. A Scout is clean in thought, word and deed.

==== Scout Association of Slovenia ====
1. A Scout is trustworthy
2. A Scout is loyal
3. A Scout is friendly
4. A Scout is prepared to help
5. A Scout is disciplinized
6. A Scout is cheerful
7. A Scout is courageous
8. A Scout is noble
9. A Scout is respectful
10. A Scout is eager for knowledge
11. A Scout is thrifty
12. A Scout lives healthy

=== Spain ===
English	Spanish
1. A scout's honour is to be trusted .; 2. A scout is loyal.; 3. A scout is useful and helpful.; 4. El scout es amigo de todos y hermano de cualquier otro scout. A scout is a friend to all and a brother to every other scout.; 5. A scout is courteous and chivalrous.; 6. A scout cares and respects nature.; 7. A scout doesn't leave things half-done.; 8. A scout smiles and sings under all difficulties.; 9. A Scout is hard-working, and respectful of others' well-being. (The Spanish phrase respetuoso del bien ajeno can also be translated as "respectful of others' goods and properties".); 10. A scout is clean and pure in thought, word and deed.	1. El scout cifra su honor en ser digno de confianza.; 2. El scout es leal.; 3. El scout es útil y servicial.; 4. El scout es amigo de todos y hermano de cualquier otro scout.; 5. El scout es cortés y caballeroso.; 6. El scout cuida y respeta la naturaleza.; 7. El scout no deja nada a medias.; 8. El scout sonrie y canta ante las dificultades.; 9. El scout es trabajador y respeta el bien ajeno.; 10. El scout es limpio y puro en pensamientos, palabras y acciones.

=== Sweden ===
English	Swedish
1. A Scout seeks his own belief and respects others 2. A Scout is honest and trustworthy 3. A Scout is friendly and helpful.; 4. A Scout is considerate and a good companion.; 5. A Scout overcomes difficulties in a good mood.; 6. A Scout learns to know and protects the Nature.; 7. A Scout accepts responsibility for themself and others.	1. En scout söker sin tro och respekterar andras 2. En scout är ärlig och pålitlig.; 3. En scout är vänlig och hjälpsam.; 4. En scout visar hänsyn och är en god kamrat.; 5. En scout möter svårigheter med gott humör.; 6. En scout lär känna och vårdar naturen.; 7. En scout känner ansvar för sig själv och andra.

=== Switzerland ===
Guides and Scouts, we wish:

1. To be honest and sincere
2. To listen to and respect others
3. To rejoice in all that is beautiful and give joy to others
4. To be thoughtful and helpful
5. To share
6. To choose to the best of our abilities and to commit ourselves
7. To protect nature and respect life
8. To face difficulties with confidence

=== Ukraine ===
The Plast Scout Law is as follows:

1. A Scout keeps his (her) word.
2. A Scout is thorough.
3. A Scout is punctual.
4. A Scout is thrifty.
5. A Scout is just.
6. A Scout is courteous.
7. A Scout is brotherly and friendly.
8. A Scout is levelheaded.
9. A Scout is useful.
10. A Scout obeys Plast leadership.
11. A Scout is diligent.
12. A Scout cares for his (her) health.
13. A Scout loves beauty and cares for it.
14. A Scout is always optimistic.

=== United Kingdom ===
==== Baden-Powell Scouts' Association ====
1. A Scouts' honour is to be trusted.
2. A Scout is loyal to The King, His Country, His Scouters, His Parents, His Employers and to those under Him.
3. A Scouts' duty is to be useful and help others.
4. A Scout is a friend to all, and a brother to every other Scout, no matter to what Country, Class or Creed the other may belong.
5. A Scout is courteous.
6. A Scout is a friend to animals.
7. A Scout obeys orders of his parents, Patrol Leader, or Scout Master without question.
8. A Scout smiles and whistles under all difficulties.
9. A Scout is thrifty.
10. A Scout is clean in thought, word and deed.

==== British Boy Scouts and British Girl Scouts Association ====
1. A Scout is honourable, truthful and reliable.
2. A Scout is loyal to The King, his/her Country, his/her Parents, his/her Officers and to comrades high and low.
3. A Scout is helpful to others, whatever it may cost him/her.
4. A Scout is a friend to all and a brother/sister to all Scouts.
5. A Scout is courteous to all.
6. A Scout is kind to animals.
7. A Scout is obedient and follows orders from his/her Parents and Officers promptly.
8. A Scout is cheerful and takes trouble with a trusting grace.
9. A Scout is self-reliant and a good steward of his/her possessions.
10. A Scout is upright in his/her conduct.

==== European Scout Federation ====
1. A Scout's honour is to be trusted.
2. A Scout is loyal to The King, his Country, her Scouters, her parents, her employers and to those under him.
3. A Scout's duty is to be useful and help others.
4. A Scout is a friend to all, and a brother to every other Scout, no matter to what country, class or creed the other belongs.
5. A Scout is courteous.
6. A Scout is a friend to animals and all created things.
7. A Scout obeys orders of his parents, Patrol Leader, or Scoutmaster without question.
8. A Scout smiles and whistles under all difficulties.
9. A Scout is thrifty.
10. A Scout is clean in thought, word and deed.

==== Girlguiding UK ====
1. A Guide is honest, reliable and can be trusted.
2. A Guide is helpful and uses her time and abilities wisely.
3. A Guide faces challenge and learns from her experiences.
4. A Guide is a good friend and a sister to all Guides.
5. A Guide is polite and considerate.
6. A Guide respects all living things and takes care of the world around her.

==== The Scout Association ====
1. A Scout is to be trusted.
2. A Scout is loyal.
3. A Scout is friendly and considerate.
4. A Scout belongs to the worldwide family of Scouts.
5. A Scout has courage in all difficulties.
6. A Scout makes good use of time and is careful of possessions and property.
7. A Scout has self-respect and respect for others.

== Interamerican Scout Region ==
Interamerican Scout Region

=== Argentina ===
==== Scouts de Argentina ====
1. A Scout loves God and lives his/her faith fully.
2. A Scout is loyal and worthy of all trust.
3. A Scout is generous, courteous, and shows solidarity.
4. A Scout is respectful and brother/sister of everyone.
5. A Scout defends and values the family.
6. A Scout loves and defends life and nature.
7. A Scout knows how to obey; he/she chooses and acts with responsibility.
8. A Scout is optimistic even through difficult times.
9. A Scout is economic, hard-working, and respectful of others' well-being. (The Spanish phrase respetuoso del bien ajeno can also be translated as "respectful of others' goods and properties".)
10. A Scout is pure and leads a healthy life.

==== Baden Powell Scouts Argentina ====
The Scout:

1. He bases his honor to be worthy of confidence.
2. He's loyal.
3. It is useful and helps others without expecting anything in return
4. It is everyone's friend, and brother to all Scouts, regardless of creed, race or social class.
5. It is polite and gentlemanly.
6. Obey without mirrors and nothing by halves.
7. Sees in nature the work of God protects animals and plants.
8. He smiles and sings in the difficulties
9. It's affordable, hardworking and thorough the good of others.
10. A Scout is clean and healthy, pure thoughts, words and actions.

==== Diocesan Association of Catholic Scouts ====
1. A Scout is trustworthy because he is responsible.
2. A Scout is loyal.
3. The Scout serves and helping others without expecting reward.
4. A Scout is friend to all and brother to other Scouts.
5. A Scout is courteous.
6. The Scout sees in nature the work of God and that's good with animals and plants.
7. A Scout obeys without mirrors and does nothing by halves.
8. A Scout smiles and sings in difficult times.
9. The Scout is thrifty and respects the property of others.
10. A Scout is clean in thought, word and deed and use all their senses.

=== Brazil ===
==== Federação de Bandeirantes do Brasil ====
A Guide:

1. is trustworthy.
2. is loyal and respects truth.
3. helps others on all occasion.
4. esteems and cherishes friendship.
5. is kind and courteous.
6. sees God in creation and protects nature.
7. knows how to obey.
8. faces all difficulties cheerfully.
9. uses resources wisely.
10. acts, thinks, and is coherent with moral values.

==== União dos Escoteiros do Brasil ====
English	Portuguese
A Scout is: 1. honored and trustworthy.; 2. loyal.; 3. always alert to help others and practices a good turn every day.; 4. a friend to all and a brother to every other Scout.; 5. courteous.; 6. good to animals and plants.; 7. obedient and disciplined.; 8. merry and smiles in difficulties.; 9. thrifty and respects the property of others.; 10. clean in body and soul.	O Escoteiro é: 1. honrado e digno de confiança 2. leal.; 3. está sempre alerta para ajudar o próximo e pratica diariamente uma boa ação.; 4. cortês.; 5. bom para os animais e as plantas.; 6. obediente e disciplinado.; 7. alegre e sorri nas dificuldades 8. econômico e respeita o bem alheio.; 9. limpo de corpo e alma.

=== Canada ===
==== Scouts Canada ====
A Scout is
Helpful and trustworthy,
Kind and cheerful,
Considerate and clean,
And wise in the use of all resources.

==== Girl Guides of Canada ====
The Guiding Law challenges me to:

1. Be honest and trustworthy
2. Use my resources wisely
3. Respect myself and others
4. Recognize and use my talents and abilities
5. Protect our common environment
6. Live with courage and strength
7. Share in the sisterhood of Guiding

==== Baden-Powell Service Association ====
1. A Scout's honour is to be trusted
2. A Scout is Loyal to the Queen, and to his country, and to his employers.
3. A Scout's duty is to be useful and to help others.
4. A Scout is a friend to all and a brother to every other Scout.
5. A Scout is Courteous.
6. A Scout is a friend to animals.
7. A Scout obeys orders of his patrol leader or Scout master without question.
8. A Scout smiles and whistles under all difficulties.
9. A Scout is thrifty.
10. A Scout is clean in thought, word and deed.

=== Chile ===
1. The Scout places his honor in being worthy of trust.
2. The Scout is loyal.
3. The Scout is useful and helps others, without thinking of compensation.
4. The Scout shares with everyone.
5. The Scout is courteous and gentlemanly.
6. The Scout cares for nature and finds God in it
7. The Scout is obedient and does nothing half way.
8. The Scout is optimistic.
9. The Scout is thrifty.
10. The Scout is clean and pure in thought, word and deed.

=== Colombia ===
English	Spanish
1. The Scout stakes his honor on being trustworthy.; 2. The Scout is loyal.; 3. A Scout is useful and helps others without expecting compensation.; 4. The Scout is a friend to all and brother to every Scout, without regard for creed, race, nationality, or social class.; 5. A Scout is courteous and respects the convictions of others.; 6. The Scout sees in nature the work of God, and pursues its conservation and progress.; 7. The Scout is obedient, responsible, and orderly.; 8. The Scout smiles and sings in times of trouble.; 9. A Scout is economical, a hard worker who is careful of the well-being of others.; 10. The Scout is clean and sane, pure in thoughts, words and actions.	1. El Scout cifra su honor en ser digno de confianza.; 2. El Scout es leal.; 3. El Scout es útil y ayuda a los demás sin esperar recompensa.; 4. El Scout es amigo de todos y hermano de cualquier Scout sin distinción de credo, raza, nacionalidad o clase social.; 5. El Scout es cortés y respeta las convicciones de los demás.; 6. El Scout ve en la naturaleza la obra de Dios y procura su conservación y progreso.; 7. El Scout es obediente, responsable y ordenado.; 8. El Scout sonríe y canta en sus dificultades.; 9. El Scout es económico, trabajador y cuidadoso del bien ajeno.; 10. El Scout es limpio y sano, puro en pensamientos, palabras y acciones.

=== Costa Rica ===
==== Asociación de Guías y Scouts de Costa Rica ====
1. A Scout shows his honour by being worthy of trust.
2. A Scout is loyal to God, his nation, his parents, his bosses, and his subordinates.
3. A Scout is useful and helps others without thinking of rewards.
4. A Scout is everybody's friend and brother/sister of all Scouts, without distinction of creed, race, nationality, or social class.
5. A Scout is courteous and well mannered.
6. A Scout sees God's work in nature. He or she protects animals and plants.
7. A Scout obeys rationally and does things in an orderly and complete manner.
8. A Scout smiles and sings through difficult times.
9. A Scout is economic, hard-working, and careful of others' well-being. (The original Spanish phrase, cuidadoso del bien ajeno, can also mean "being careful/respectful of others' properties".)
10. A Scout is clean and healthy; pure in his thoughts, words, and actions.

=== Guatemala ===
==== Asociación de Scouts de Guatemala ====
English	Spanish
1. The Scout bases his/her honour on being trustworthy.; 2. The Scout is patriotic and loyal.; 3. The Scout is useful and helps others without thinking of a reward.; 4. The Scout is a friend to everyone and a brother to every Scout, without distinction of race, creed, social class, or nationality.; 5. The Scout is courteous and chivalrous.; 6. The Scout sees in nature the work of God; he protects animals and plants.; 7. The Scout is obedient and does things in order and completely.; 8. The Scout smiles and sings in his difficulties.; 9. The Scout is thrifty, hard-working, and careful of others' well-being/goods.; 10. The Scout is clean and healthy, pure in thought, word, and deed.	1. El / La Scout cifra su honor en ser digno de confianza.; 2. El / La Scout es patriota y leal.; 3. El / La Scout es útil y ayuda a los demás sin pensar en recompensa.; 4. El / La Scout es amigo/a de todos y hermano/a de cualquier Scout, sin distinción de raza, credo, clase social, o nacionalidad.; 5. El / La Scout es cortés y caballeroso/ (para las Muchachas Scouts:) y actúa con nobleza.; 6. El / La Scout ve en la naturaleza la obra de Dios; protege a los animales y las plantas.; 7. El / La Scout es obediente y hace las cosas en orden y completas.; 8. El / La Scout sonríe y canta en sus dificultades.; 9. El / La Scout es económico/a, trabajador/a, y cuidadoso/a del bien ajeno.; 10. El / La Scout es limpio/a y sano/a, puro/a en pensamiento, palabra, y acción.

=== Trinidad and Tobago ===
A scout:

1. is to be trusted
2. is loyal
3. is friendly and considerate
4. is a brother to all scouts
5. has courage in all difficulties
6. makes good use of his time and is careful with possessions and property
7. has respect for himself and others

=== United States ===
==== Boy Scouts of America ====
The BSA's initial Scout Law was virtually identical to that of Britain's and was first adopted on July 9, 1910. This version steadily changed until August 1, 1911, when the BSA's Scout Law took its current form.

A Scout is:

- trustworthy,
- loyal,
- helpful,
- friendly,
- courteous,
- kind,
- obedient,
- cheerful,
- thrifty,
- brave,
- clean, and
- reverent.

==== Girl Scouts of the USA ====
I will do my best to be
honest and fair,
friendly and helpful,
considerate and caring,
courageous and strong, and
responsible for what I say and do,
and to
respect myself and others,
respect authority,
use resources wisely,
make the world a better place, and
be a sister to every Girl Scout.

==== Baden-Powell Scouts' Association ====
1. A Scout's honor is to be trusted.
2. A Scout is loyal to country, Scouters, parents, employers, and to those under them.
3. A Scout's duty is to be useful and to help others.
4. A Scout is a friend to all, and a brother to every other Scout, no matter to what country, class, or creed, the other may belong.
5. A Scout is courteous.
6. A Scout is a friend to animals.
7. A Scout obeys the orders of parents, Patrol Leader, or Scout Leader, without question.
8. A Scout smiles and whistles under all difficulties.
9. A Scout is thrifty.
10. A Scout is clean in thought, word, and deed.
