= Kiribati Scout Association =

National Scouting organization of Kiribati

- Country: Kiribati
- Founded: 1993
- Membership: 1,333
- Chief Commissioner: Titi Beniata Rimon
- Affiliation: World Organization of the Scout Movement

The Kiribati Scout Association (i-Kiribati:Tikauti ni Kiribati) is the national Scouting organization of Kiribati. It was founded in 1993, and the island nation joined the World Organization of the Scout Movement in the same year. With its close link with Scouts Australia since 1986, Kiribati Scouts have been represented in international Scout events and leader training courses. Membership in 2002 stood at 1,333.

== History ==
Scouting in Kiribati was first introduced in 1914, when the country was known as the Gilbert and Ellice Islands. Scouting operated as branch of the Scout Association (UK) in the early years. The Gilbert and Ellice Scout Association was founded in 1927, and joined the World Organization of the Scout Movement in 1933.

After the Japanese occupation during World War II, a British Scoutmaster working with local Scouts was imprisoned and killed.

The Gilbert and Ellice Islands were separated administratively in the 1970s to become the independent Commonwealth nations of Kiribati and Tuvalu, and their Scouting movements took different paths.

== Program ==
The highest rank is the President's Award, a title common to ranks in other nations.

The membership badge of the Kiribati Scout Association features a green coconut.

== See also ==
- The Girl Guides Association of Kiribati
