= Fédération indochinoise des associations du scoutisme =

Fédération Indochinoise des Associations du Scoutisme
- Founded: 1930
- Defunct: 1954

The Fédération Indochinoise des Associations du Scoutisme (FIAS, Indochinese Federation of Scouting Associations; Vietnamese Liên Hội Hướng Đạo Đông Dương) was the earliest Scouting governing body in French Indochina, encompassing several smaller Cambodian, Laotian, and Vietnamese Scout associations, open without bias of faith or political viewpoint, from 1930 to 1954. The federation spawned, then later devolved into, the Scouts Lao, the Hội Hướng Đạo Việt Nam and the Angkar Khemarak Kayarith.

1930s membership card from the Annamese branch of the Fédération Indochinoise des Associations du Scoutisme

In 1930, Scouting appeared in Indochina and began to develop around schools and colleges in Hanoi and Saigon. André Lefèvre, chief of the Eclaireurs de France, set up a training camp for 60 Scoutmasters from all over French Indochina in 1935 at Đà Lạt. At the end of 1937, French Scouting sent Scoutmaster Raymond Schlemmer to Indochina to oversee the setting up of Scouting in all three regions, creating FIAS.

From 1939 through 1945, the political situation affected Scouting activities all across the country, as World War II engendered independence movements. The French began to lose control and were finally overthrown by Japanese intervention. This ceased the French Scouts' activity in Indochina.

Japanese military authorities did not consistently encourage the Scouting movement in occupied territories. Where local conditions were favorable, authorities would permit local Scouting or introduce Japanese-style Scouting, or Shōnendan, and sometimes even made this compulsory. On the other hand, where conditions were not favorable, and anti-Japanese sentiments were likely to be nurtured through Scouting, the authorities would prohibit it entirely. In French Indochina, Vietnamese Scouting was permitted. After the coup in March, 1945, Bao Dai was installed as the puppet ruler, and Vietnam was nominally independent. The Japanese prohibited French Scouting, but would use Vietnamese Scouts to control the French population in Saigon.

In 1946, the National Scoutmaster Conference unified the Scouting movements in the three regions of Vietnam, and the General Committee was established. The First Indochina War erupted at the end of 1946, and the Scouting movement in Vietnam was on hiatus until 1950.

During the war, many members of the Scouting movement were separated into different sides. While all members of the General Committee established in 1946 followed Hoàng Ðạo Thúy into hiding, some Scoutmasters and Scout members in the cities began to restore the movement from 1950, especially in Hanoi.

After the Geneva World Scout Conference in 1954, Scouting returned to Indochina. The Scout Association of North Vietnam was abolished as North Vietnam was under communist rule, and as a result, the Scouts lost their former training ground, but soon established a new one near Đà Lạt.

The symbolism in the emblem of Fédération Indochinoise des Associations du Scoutisme incorporates the red lotus, and can be seen in the modern emblems of the Scouts Lao and the Hội Hướng Đạo Việt Nam.

== Publications ==
- L'Appel Scout, (The Scout Call) bulletin of the Canon Cornette troop, Saïgon, 1938-1939(?).
- Bulletin de liaison des aumôniers et des chefs catholiques de la Fédération indochinoise des associations de Scoutisme, (Newsletter for chaplains and Catholic leaders of FIAS), monthly publication aligned with the spiritual view of the Scouts de France, Hanoï, 1942.
- Chef, (Chief), official organ of the leaders of FIAS, 500 copies printed monthly 1937-1939 (?). Published in Hanoi and Saigon.
- Hướng Đạo (Les Scouts, The Scouts), official organ of the leadership of Scouts de Cochinchine (Scouts of Cochin China), Hanoï, 1935–1940. Preceded by Hướng Đạo Thang Tien (Les Scouts en avant, Forward Scouts) and absorbs Thang Tien (En avant, Forward, 1935–1936) in 1937.
- Montjoie, organ of the Scouts de France d'Hanoï (Scouts de France of Hanoi), the Catholic Scout body of FIAS, Hanoï, 1932–1940.
- Rayonner (Getting Around), organ of the Scouts-routiers de Cochinchine (Rover Scouts of Cochin China), 1936-1940 (?), 150 copies in 1939, published in Saigon.
- Servir (To Serve), monthly publication of the Association cambodgienne de Scoutisme (Cambodian Association of Scouting), Phnom Penh, 1944.
