= Vietnamese Girl Scout Association =

Hội Nữ Hướng Đạo Việt Nam
- Country: South Vietnam
- Founded: 1957

The Vietnamese Girl Scout Association (Vietnamese: Hội Nữ Hướng Đạo Việt Nam) was the organization for Girl Scouts in South Vietnam. Girl Scouting began in Vietnam in 1928. In April 1957, the Vietnamese Girl Scout Association was established. In 1966 the Vietnamese Girl Scout Association was recognized as a member of the World Association of Girl Guides and Girl Scouts, last mentioned in 1973.

Outside Vietnam since 1975, the Vietnamese Girl Scout Association and the Vietnamese Scout Association have merged into a single group and operate under the leadership of the International Central Committee of Vietnamese Scouting, formed in 1983. Inside Vietnam, Scouting was initially banned. Moves by some Communist Party members to reestablish a nationalist version of Scouting have been rejected by the General Secretariat of the World Organization of the Scout Movement. A few semi-official Scouting groups exist in Vietnam at present, which include both boys and girls together.

Boys and girls can be seen together in one Scouting unit in Vietnam

Girl Scouting may again be making inroads in Vietnam, as in 1993 a reception was held in Manila, Philippines in conjunction with WAGGGS' Asia Pacific Symposium of NGOs for Women in Development. The aim was to introduce or reintroduce the Girl Guiding/Girl Scouting movement and to explore possibilities of starting/restarting Girl Guiding/Girl Scouting in Vietnam, as well as Cambodia, Iran, Russia, Uzbekistan and Tibet. Fifty women leaders from those nations attended the Asia Pacific Symposium, sharing their Girl Guiding/Girl Scouting experiences.

However, like overseas Vietnamese Scouting, girls and boys may now be seen together in coeducational Scouting groups in Vietnam.

== See also ==
- Vietnamese Scout Association
