= The Girl Guides Association of Kiribati =

- Country: Kiribati
- Founded: 1926
- Membership: 250
- Affiliation: World Association of Girl Guides and Girl Scouts

The Girl Guides Association of Kiribati is the national Guiding organization of Kiribati. It serves 250 members (as of 2022). Founded in 1926, the girls-only organization became an associate member of the World Association of Girl Guides and Girl Scouts in 1990.

== History ==
The Association was founded in 1926 by a member of the London Missionary Society; it was considered a branch of the Girlguiding group in the United Kingdom, as the islands were a British colony at the time as part of the Gilbert Islands. The first groups were started in Beru, and after a few years, the local Catholic church began starting more groups.

The activity of the Association was interrupted during World War II, as Japan seized the islands from 1941 and 1945. Activities resumed in 1957 in Bairiki, Betio, and Bikenibeu and began to spread to the outer islands. The Association was supported by the Department of Education, which sent two teachers to the outer islands to provide training and assist in recruitment, and it was also allowed to send mail for free.

In 1989, the Association became independent. It drew up a plan to increase activities in the outer islands. They had 435 members in 1998. In 2022, membership had decreased to 250.

== Activities ==
Groups typically camp four to six times a year. The Association leases a small islet with a permanent shelter for camping. In 2022, it was one of several Girl Guides Associations in the South Pacific that partnered with the United Nations Environment Programme to decrease plastic pollution in local communities.

== See also ==
- Kiribati Scout Association
