= Girl Guides Association of the Kingdom of Tonga =

The Girl Guides Association of the Kingdom of Tonga
- Country: Tonga
- Founded: 1952
- Membership: 2,238
- Affiliation: World Association of Girl Guides and Girl Scouts

The Girl Guides Association of the Kingdom of Tonga is the national Guiding organization of Tonga. It serves 2,238 members (as of 2012). Founded in 1952, the girls-only organization became an associate member of the World Association of Girl Guides and Girl Scouts in 1987.

== History ==
Guiding was started in Tonga by Sālote Tupou III in 1952, with the first groups being started on the main island of Tongatapu. In 1955, Halaevalu Mataʻaho ʻAhomeʻe, the consort of King Tāufaʻāhau Tupou IV, became commissioner of the Association, and in 1957 the first Brownie pack was started. Queen Sālote opened a headquarters for the Association in Nukuʻalofa in 1960. Over the next few years, Guiding activities began on the islands of Ha'apai and Vava'u, and a visiting Guide trainer from New Zealand in 1963 found good interest and support for Guiding on those islands. In 1971, Guiding spread to ʻEua.

The Association was original a branch association of Girlguiding in the United Kingdom, but it became independent in 1986 and became an associate member of the World Association of Girl Guides and Girl Scouts in 1987. By the late 1990s, Guiding activities had become restricted to Tongatapu due to a lack of leaders and the difficulty of visiting and communicating with the outer islands. However, activity restarted on Vava'u in 1998. There were 345 members in 1997.

In November 2012, the Association opened a new training center in Nukuʻalofa with assistance from the Japanese government. It receives a yearly government grant to help with utility bills and maintenance. Membership that year was 2,238. The association celebrated its 65th anniversary in 2017 along with Remembrance Day.

== Activities ==
Camps are often held at the ground around the Association's headquarters, or on beaches and smaller islands of the archipelago. While the Association is girls-only, school programs include boys as well. In 2016, the Association, along with several other non-governmental organizations, participated in a forum with representatives from the Tongan government to discuss progress made on gender equality in Tonga as well as future aims.

== See also ==
- Tonga branch of The Scout Association
