= Ho Chi Minh Young Pioneer Organization =

Vietnamese young pioneer organization

Ho Chi Minh Young Pioneer Organization Đội Thiếu niên Tiền phong Hồ Chí Minh
- Emblem of the organization
- President: Nguyễn Phạm Duy Trang
- Founded: 15 May 1941
- Headquarters: Số 62 Bà Triệu, Hoàn Kiếm, Hà Nội
- Membership: ▲12,000,000
- Ideology: Communism; Marxism–Leninism; Ho Chi Minh Thought
- Mother party: Communist Party of Vietnam
- Website: https://thieunhivietnam.vn/

The Ho Chi Minh Young Pioneer Organization (Vietnamese: Đội Thiếu niên Tiền phong Hồ Chí Minh) is a communist youth organization operating in Vietnam named after former Vietnamese president Ho Chi Minh. It operates as a constituent part of the Communist Party of Vietnam and had approximately 12 million members as of 2009.

== History ==
The Ho Chi Minh Young Pioneer Organization was founded by the Communist Party of Vietnam on 15 May 1941 in Na Ma, Truong Ha commune, Hà Quảng District, Cao Bằng Province. The organization is instructed and guided by the Ho Chi Minh Communist Youth Union. It is required to have prior membership in the Communist Youth Organization to join the Communist Party of Vietnam, and being a Young Pioneer is a prerequisite to joining the Youth Organization.

Its motto is: Vì tổ quốc xã hội chủ nghĩa, vì lý tưởng của Bác Hồ vĩ đại: Sẵn sàng! (English: For the socialist homeland, for the great Uncle Ho's ideals: Be ready!).

== See also ==
- Scouting and Guiding in Vietnam

== Literature ==
- Имени Хо Ши Мина / авт. - сост. Лэ Ван. М., "Молодая гвардия"; Ханой, Ким Донг, 1984 - 159 стр.
