= Raymond Schlemmer =

- Raymond Schlemmer (left) and Guillaume de Larigaudie (right) at the Frankston Jamboree in 1934
- Known for: Seminal figure in the early history of Scouting in France

Raymond Schlemmer was a seminal figure in the early history of Scouting in France, from 1922 to 1952.

== Career ==
In late 1937, French Scouting sent Scoutmaster Schlemmer to the Cambodian, Laotian, and Vietnamese areas of Indochina to oversee the setting up of the Fédération Indochinoise des Associations du Scoutisme (FIAS, Indochinese Federation of Scouting Associations) in all three regions.

With the end of World War II, French Sea Scouting experienced a renewal due to the impetus of Schlemmer. In 1947, the Jamboree of Peace was held at Moisson, and Schlemmer directed a marine camp on an island in the Seine next to the Jamboree site, with the assistance of the French navy.

== Retirement ==
Schlemmer retired from Scouting in 1952, after 30 years of service, and was succeeded by Commander Marcel Pillet.
