= Vietnamese Scout Association =

Youth organization in Vietnam

- Vietnamese Scout emblem

- Scout flag
- Hướng đạo Việt Nam
- Country: United States, Germany, Canada, Australia, France, Vietnam
- Founded: 1930
- Founder: Trần Văn Khắc
Previous; Fédération Indochinoise des Associations du Scoutisme	

The Vietnamese Scout Association (Vietnamese: Hội Hướng Đạo Việt Nam (HĐVN)) is a youth organization that was established in Vietnam and active between 1930 and 1975. The association was recognized by the World Organization of the Scout Movement from 1957 to 1975.

Because of the political situation and war in Vietnam, it was banned in communist North Vietnam after 1954 and in the entire nation after the communist victory following the fall of Saigon. It presently exists in exile, and is reforming within Vietnam itself. There are reports of clandestine Scouting activities in Vietnam dating from 1994 and 2002. Until WOSM recognition returned in 2019, Vietnam was the largest nation in population to have Scouting that is not recognized by the organization.

== History ==
Trần Văn Khắc (right), founder of the Vietnamese Scouting Association, and Dr. Nguyễn Văn Thơ, former head of HĐVN, at the 2nd International Vietnamese Scouting Jamboree held in Toronto, Canada (1988)

From its establishment in 1930, the Vietnamese Scout Association experienced many stages of development, and attracted many figures who later played important roles in the political stage of both North and South Vietnam, including North Vietnamese Minister of Defense Tạ Quang Bửu, Mayor of Hanoi Trần Duy Hưng, composer Lưu Hữu Phước, physician Tôn Thất Tùng, Võ Thành Minh, physician Phạm Ngọc Thạch, Vice Premier of South Vietnam Trần Văn Tuyên, physician Phạm Biểu Tâm, South Vietnamese Senator Trần Điền, and writer Cung Giũ Nguyên.

=== 1920s to 1946 ===
Scouting in Vietnam first started in the lycées for French children and upper-class Vietnamese children. Between 1927 and 1930, Vietnamese Scouting began to appear in northern Vietnam, most of them subordinate to the French Scouting groups. In September 1930, two Vietnamese athletes, Trần Văn Khắc and Tạ Văn Rục, started a Scout movement named Đồng tử quân in Hanoi. The members of the movement wore green neckerchiefs with red hem. It gradually spread to the surrounding areas. Trần Văn Khắc is generally accepted as the founder of Vietnamese Scouting. This first Vietnamese Scout program was heavily athletic.

In 1932, Trần Văn Khắc went south to Cochinchina, and together with Lương Thái, Huỳnh Văn Diệp, and Trần Coln established the Cochinchinese Scout Association. During that time, Hoàng Ðạo Thúy was the General Secretary of the Annamese Scouting Association.

Between 1933 and 1935, Vietnamese Scouting spread quickly among the population, as branches of the three main associations of French Scouts and Pionniers. Three branches of Vietnamese Scouting were established-Cub Scouts, Boy Scouts and Rover Scouts.

André Lefèvre, chief of the Éclaireurs de France, set up a training camp for 60 Scoutmasters from all over French Indochina. At the end of 1937, French Scouting sent Scoutmaster Raymond Schlemmer to the Cambodian, Laotian, and Vietnamese areas of Indochina to oversee the setting up of the Fédération Indochinoise des Associations du Scoutisme (FIAS, Indochinese Federation of Scouting Associations) in all three regions.

From 1939 through 1945, the political situation affected Scouting activities all across the country, as World War II engendered a movement for an independent Vietnam. The French began to lose control and were finally overthrown by Japanese intervention. This ceased the French Scouts' activity in Vietnam, as well as all Scouting activities.

Japanese military authorities did not consistently encourage the Scouting movement in occupied territories. Where local conditions were favorable, authorities would permit local Scouting or introduce Japanese-style Scouting, or Shōnendan, and sometimes even made this compulsory. On the other hand, where conditions were not favorable, and anti-Japanese sentiments were likely to be nurtured through Scouting, the authorities would prohibit it entirely. In French Indochina, Vietnamese Scouting was permitted. After the coup in March 1945, Bao Dai was installed as the puppet ruler, and Vietnam was nominally independent. The Japanese prohibited French Scouting, but would use Vietnamese Scouts to control the French population in Saigon.

=== 1946 to 1954 ===
In 1946, the National Scoutmaster Conference unified the Scouting movements in the three regions of Vietnam, and the General Committee was established. The First Indochina War erupted at the end of 1946, and the Scouting movement in Vietnam was on hiatus until 1950.

During the war, many members of the Scouting movement were separated into different sides. While all members of the General Committee established in 1946 followed Hoàng Ðạo Thúy into hiding, some Scoutmasters and Scout members in the cities began to restore the movement from 1950, especially in Hanoi.

During this period, a song composed by Scout member Lưu Hữu Phước became the official song of the movement. From then on the song has been used in all official activities of the Vietnamese Scout Association. Lưu Hữu Phước would later go on to pen songs that became the national anthems of both the Republic of Vietnam and Provisional Revolutionary Government of the Republic of South Vietnam.

After the Geneva World Scout Conference in 1954, WOSM-recognized Scouting returned to Vietnam. The Scout Association of North Vietnam was abolished as North Vietnam was under communist rule, and as a result, the Scouts lost their former training ground, but soon established a new one near Đà Lạt.

=== 1954 to 1975 ===
From 1954 to 1975, Scouting in South Vietnam played an important role in Vietnamese society. The Scout Constitution was drawn up in 1952, with the approval of the Ministry of Youth Affairs, and international recognition was given at the beginning of 1957. In 1959, Vietnam had 3,100 Scouts. In April 1975, South Vietnam was overrun by the Viet Cong, and the Vietnamese Scout Association was banned. Outside of Vietnam, Vietnamese Scouts formed an exile organization and continued their Scouting programs.

In 1955, the Hồi Nguyên Training Camp was established and opened its doors to its first classes in August 1956.

In 1957, the Association was recognized as a member of the World Organization of the Scout Movement. It participated in the formation of the Asia-Pacific Scouting region and became a founding member of the region.

In 1958, the Tùng Nguyên National Training Camp was established, under the leadership of Scoutmaster Cung Giũ Nguyên. This is where all Scoutmasters between 1958 and 1975 were trained.

In 1959, Vietnam participated in the 10th World Scout Jamboree in the Philippines. The Scout uniform was changed from brown to khaki yellow. In the end of 1959, the Phục Hưng (Renaissance) National Jamboree was held at Trảng Bom National Park (Biên Hoà) with 2,500 Scouts in attendance, marking the renaissance of the movement.

In 1969, the National Scouting Jamboree was held in Da Lat during Christmas. In December 1970, the National Jamboree was held in Suối Tiên (Thủ Đức) with the name Giữ Vững (Steadfast), marking 40 years of the movement. This was the Association's most successful jamboree. In 1971, the Association participated in the 13th World Scout Jamboree held in Asagiri Heights, Japan.

In 1974, the National Jamboree was held in Tam Bình, Gia Định (modern-day Ho Chi Minh City/Saigon) under the name Tự Lực (Self-sufficiency).

The last national jamborees were held in areas around Saigon because of the security situation: the Vietnam War was expanding and moving towards Saigon. In the first few months of 1975, many Scouting members followed the wave of refugees leaving the country and the Association ceased operating. The communist authorities replaced Scouting with the local Pioneer Movement, the Ho Chi Minh Young Pioneer Organization, established in North Vietnam on 15 May 1941

=== After 1975 ===
At the fall of Saigon in 1975, the Vietnamese Scout Association was finally banned by the communist government and its headquarters at 18 Bui Chu, Saigon was taken over. Some Vietnamese Scouts and leaders, who evacuated before the communist takeover, gathered together to establish Scout groups in temporarily set-up camps and continued their mission. Later the movement experienced a gradual rebirth, especially in the refugee camps throughout Southeast Asia (Malaysia, Thailand, Singapore, Indonesia, the Philippines, and Hong Kong) before all the refugee camps were closed down in the early 1990s; and in the host nations where the refugees made their homes, i.e. the United States, Canada, Australia, France, Belgium, Italy, England, Norway, and the Netherlands.

In 1976, Nguyễn Quang Minh established a liaison office for overseas Vietnamese Scouts and published a monthly Vietnamese Scouting news magazine in Portland, Oregon. In 1980, an International Vietnamese Jamboree was held in Scouters' Mountain in Portland, to celebrate the 50th anniversary of Vietnamese Scouting.

In 1983, the International Central Committee of Vietnamese Scouting (ICCVS) was created. It is the umbrella organization for Vietnamese Scouts in the diaspora. The Committee sent a delegation to the 1998 Congress for the Asia-Pacific Region which was attended by 150 nations. Since its birth, the International Central Committee of Vietnamese Scouting has organized and managed ten International Vietnamese Scouting Jamborees named Thang Tien (Moving Forward) in France (1985, 1993), Canada (1988), the United States (1990, 1998, 2002, 2006, 2009, 2014) and Australia (1996), as well as many other smaller camps and jamborees. It has also held training camps such as Hồi Nguyên, Tùng Nguyên, and Bạch Mã. (Tùng Nguyên camps provide Wood Badge training). Media and the Internet are widely utilized to share consistent Scouting messages and activities between local Vietnamese Scouting groups and to the larger overseas Vietnamese community.

In 2000, a celebration of the 70th anniversary of Vietnamese Scouting was held in San Jose, California.

=== Pathfinder Scouts Vietnam ===
In January 2019, WOSM announced that the Pathfinder Scouts Vietnam organization, with a membership of more than 5,000, had been admitted as a new full member of the organization's Asia-Pacific Region, marking the official return of Vietnamese Scouting.

In the midst of the COVID-19 pandemic, the PSV marked with low-key events the 90th anniversary of the newly revived and rehabilitated Vietnamese Scouting movement in 2020.

== Resurgence in Vietnam ==
Exploring Mount LangBian and visiting Tùng Nguyên Training Camp in May 2007 – Da Lat, Vietnam

Until his death, one of the pioneers of the Vietnamese Scouting movement, Hoàng Đạo Thúy (1900-14 February 1994), a communist party member, had tried without success to establish a Communist Scouting association. In late 1991, Vu Xuan Hong, Secretary of the Movement of Marxist Youth, approached the Asia-Pacific Regional Office of the WOSM. The General Secretariat of the international movement did not follow up on this approach, since the organization cannot give allegiance to a political or national entity.

Some former leaders gathered together for a traditional Vietnamese Scouting Day meeting on 31 May 1993 in Hanoi. It was the first Scouting gathering since 1954 in northern Vietnam, in hopes of re-establishing the Vietnamese Scouting movement, but the result was not as expected at that point.

Through the first decades of the 21st century, although the Vietnamese government by then had not yet given official renewed recognition to Scouting, there were a lot of Scouting units already established and operating in Vietnam, mostly in southern Vietnam, thanks partly to the diaspora and overseas support. Today one can count approximately 50 Scout groups with one Scout Council in Ho Chi Minh City, one Scout District in Cần Thơ City, two Scout Districts in Da Nang City, one Scout District in Xuân Lộc (Đồng Nai) and many more Scout groups across southern Vietnam.

Until 2018 when the Pathfinders were founded, there were no reports of Scouting activities in northern Vietnam. Today, the Pathfinders, with their restored WOSM membership, serve as an adjunct to the HCMYPO in Vietnam, in like manner as the co-existence of both Pioneers and Scouts in Yugoslavia from 1950 to 1990, as well as due to Vietnam being one of the oldest Scouting nations in the ASEAN.

== Girl Scouting ==
Boys and girls can be seen together in one Scouting unit in Vietnam

The Vietnamese Girl Scout Association (Vietnamese: Hội Nữ Hướng Đạo Việt Nam) is a former member of the World Association of Girl Guides and Girl Scouts, last mentioned in 1973.

Outside Vietnam since 1975, the Vietnamese Girl Scout Association and the Vietnamese Scout Association have merged into a single group and operate under the leadership of the International Central Committee of Vietnamese Scouting.

However, like overseas Vietnamese Scouting, girls and boys may now be seen together in coeducational Scouting groups in Vietnam, mostly today under the Pathfinders.

== International Scouting units in Vietnam ==
In addition, there are USA Girl Scouts Overseas in Ho Chi Minh City, serviced by way of USAGSO headquarters in New York City, and there are American Boy Scouts in Hanoi, serving in Cub Scout Pack 844, linked to the Direct Service branch of the Boy Scouts of America, which supports units around the world. There are also Boy Scout Troop 2 and Cub Scout Pack 2 serving in he capital, Hanoi. These organizations have in a way been responsible, indirectly, for the revival of organized scouting in all of Vietnam itself.

== Ideals and methods ==
The Scout Motto is Sắp Sẵn, translating as Be Prepared in Vietnamese. The Scout emblem incorporates the red lotus, the Vietnamese national flower.

== Organization ==
Overseas Vietnamese Scouts are affiliated with Scout associations in their resident countries, and as such are part of these associations. However, most of them have the same International Central Committee of Vietnamese Scouting, whose committee members are elected to a four-year term. The committee helps coordinate and direct all the activities between oversea Vietnamese Scouting units, such as International Vietnamese Scouting Jamborees and Scout leader training.

There are total 54 overseas Scout Groups with approximately 4,000 Scouts, according to Nguyễn Văn Thuất, President of the International Central Committee of Vietnamese Scouting from 2002 to 2006, in an interview with Phương Anh of Radio Free Asia at the end of the 8th International Vietnamese Scouting Jamboree.

Inside Vietnam, the unofficial Interprovincial Committee was set up to oversee all the activities within Vietnam until 2018, when the Pathfinders were officially founded as the sole national organization. Today the PSV serves as a part of the wider Vietnamese Scouting family, working with the ICCVS to further on the ongoing revival of Scouting in this nation.

=== Structure ===
Before the partition of Vietnam in 1954, the Vietnamese Scout Association was divided into three geographical Scout Regions: Northern (Bắc kỳ), Central (Trung kỳ), and Southern (Nam kỳ). Each of these regions were further broken up into local councils (Châu). The local councils consisted of a number of Scout Districts (Đạo), made up of Scout Groups (Liên đoàn).

After 1954, North Vietnam became a communist country and Scouting ceased to exist there. In South Vietnam, Vietnamese Scout Association maintained the same structure as before, except there were no geographical regions.

The Groups have been the basic Scout units for Vietnamese Scouting since the organization's inception in 1930. Groups can consist of four Scout sections- Cub Packs (Ấu đoàn), Scout Troops (Thiếu đoàn), Venturer Crews (Kha đoàn), and Rover Crews (Tráng đoàn). Scout Groups are led by a Group Scout Leader (Liên đoàn trưởng) whose main role is handling communication between the local District and the Section leaders.

=== Sections ===
At the organization's inception in 1930, Vietnamese Scouting had three sections (Cub Scouts, Boy Scout, and Rover Scouts), like the original ones were developed by Robert Baden-Powell.

Age Range	Scouting	Hướng đạo
7 to 10	Cub Scout	Sói con
11 to 15	Boy Scout	Thiếu sinh
16 to 18	Venture Scout	Kha Sinh
18 and above	Rover Scout	Tráng sinh

Scouting in Vietnam, like other organizations across the world, were reviewed and reformed when the National Scout Leader Conference met in Gia Dinh (presently Ho Chi Minh City) in December 1965. During the meeting, a new Scout section was created, bridging between Boy Scouts and Rover Scouts, and named "ngành Kha" similar to Venture Scouts in Commonwealth nations.

Presently, the current co-ed Vietnamese Scouting - inclusive of the PSV program in Vietnam itself - has four sections (except Vietnamese Scouting in other countries where Beaver Scouts exist):

- Cub Scouts/Brownies: 7 to 11 (Sói con)
- Boy Scouts/Girl Scouts: 11 to 15 (Thiếu sinh)
- Venture Scouts: 15 to 18 (Kha sinh)
- Rover Scouts/Ranger Scouts: 18 to 25 (Tráng sinh)

Including Beavers and/or equivalents in select countries, all are open to both genders.
