= World Federation of Independent Scouts =

World Federation in Laubach, Germany

- Country: Worldwide
- Founded: 1996
- Founder: Lawrie Dring
- Membership: 7.2 million (2020)
- President: Klaus Tegeder
- Website wfis.world

The World Federation of Independent Scouts (WFIS) is a non-governmental international Scouting organization with over 7 million members in 151 affiliated Scout organizations in 65 countries. WFIS was formed in Laubach, Germany, in 1996 by Lawrie Dring, a British Scouter with the independent Baden-Powell Scouts' Association (BPSA).

The World Federation of Independent Scouts is open to any Scouting association that is not affiliated with another international organization. WFIS requires that member associations "follow, and use, Baden-Powell's original program, traditions, uniforms, morals, ethics, and structure as laid out in Baden-Powell's Scouting for Boys," amended only for "health, environmental, first-aid, and safety reasons."

The current president of the WFIS World Council is Klaus Tegeder, who was elected for a five-year term in 2007 and reelected in 2012 and 2017. He is the former president of WFIS-Europe and still leads a German Scout troop.

The World Federation of Independent Scouts has experienced strong growth, the affiliate Scout organizations collectively had an estimated 200,000 members in 3562 Scout Groups in 2010.

== WFIS Worldwide Committee ==
The WFIS Worldwide Committee is the chief executive body of the World Federation of Independent Scouts and is composed of elected volunteers. WFIS-Worldwide acts as an umbrella association for each of the regional Scout organisations.

=== Current members of the WFIS Worldwide Committee ===
| Name | Position |
|---|---|
| Klaus Tegeder | President |
| Fabian Figueroa | Vice-President |
| Silvana Silva Mauriello | Secretary |
| Per Stigaard | Treasurer |
| Marc Bruyneel | Wood Beads (Wood Badge) Coordinator |

== Regional divisions ==
The WFIS is divided into seven regions:

- Africa
- America
- Asia
- Europe
- Middle East
- Oceania
- South East Asia

== List of members ==
Including prospected members

=== WFIS Africa ===
5860 members in 2010

| Country | Group |
|---|---|
| Burkina Faso | |
| Burundi | |
| Comoros | |
| Congo | |
| Ethiopia | |
| Ghana | |
| Ivory Coast / Cote D´Ivoire | |
| Kenya | |
| Mali | |
| Nigeria | |
| Rwanda | |
| Tanzania | |
| Togo | |
| Uganda | |

=== WFIS Asia ===
155,303 members in 2010

| Country | Group | Membership status |
|---|---|---|
| India | Hindustan Scouts and Guides Association | full member |
| India | Scout Bharti | full member |
| India | The Scouts/Guides Organisation | full member |
| India | Shriram Bajpai Scouts & Guides Organisations | full member |
| India | Federation of India for Sports, Scouting and Education | Prospect Member |
| India | Future Scouts & guides | Prospect Member |
| India | Indian Scouts and Guides Organisations | Prospect Member |
| Japan | Independent Scouts of Japan | prospect member |
| Nepal | Metro Scouts Nepal | prospect member |
| Nepal | Nepal Independent Scouts Association | prospect member |

=== WFIS Europe ===
10,834 members in 2010

| Country | Group |
|---|---|
| Austria | Scouts of Europa |
| Belgium | Onafhankelijke Scouts en Gidsen - Scouts et Guides Indépendants |
| Czech Republic | Skaut - Český skauting ABS |
| Czech Republic | Svaz skautu a skautek Ceske Republiky |
| Czech Republic | Skaut SSV |
| Denmark | De Gule Spejdere i Danmark – Baden-Powell spejderne |
| France | Scouts de Chavagnes |
| Germany | Bund Europäischer St. Georgs-Pfadfinderinnen und -Pfadfinder |
| Germany | Bund Unabhängiger Pfadfinder, Stamm Cassiopeia |
| Germany | Christliche freie Pfadfinderschaft Goldenstedt |
| Germany | Christliche Pfadfinderschaft Dreieich |
| Germany | Deutscher Pfadfinderbund e. V. gegr. 1911 (DPB 1911) |
| Germany | Europäischer Pfadfinderbund - Georgsritter e. V. |
| Germany | Europäischer Pfadfinderbund St. Georg |
| Germany | Freier Pfadfinderbund Asgard |
| Germany | Freier Pfadfinderbund St. Georg |
| Germany | Independent Scout Association |
| Germany | Pfadfinder im Mühlenbecker Land |
| Germany | Pfadfinderbund Weltenbummler e.V. |
| Germany | Pullution Police |
| Germany | Solmser Pfadfinderschaft |
| Ireland | Baden-Powell Scouts Slyguff |
| Ireland | 2nd Cavan Scouts |
| Italy | Associazione Esploratori e Guide Italiani |
| Italy | Associazione Indipendente Scout (Assiscout) |
| Italy | Associazione Sezione Scout di Gela |
| Italy | Assoraider |
| Italy | Baden-Powell Scouts Italia |
| Italy | Confederazione Italiana dello Scautismo Cristiano |
| Italy | Federazione del Movimento Scout Italiano - FederScout |
| Italy | Fedarazione Italiana di Scautismo Raider – FIS Raider |
| Kosovo | National Scout Center of Kosovo |
| Latvia | Latvijas Kristīgie Skauti (Christian Scouts of Latvia) |
| Malta | Baden-Powell Scouts Malta |
| Poland | Zrzeszenie Harcerskie Piąta |
| Portugal | União dos Escoteiros Portugueses (UEP) |
| Romania | Asociatia Cercetasilor Traditionali din Romania |
| Russia | Russian Union of Scouts |
| Spain | Associació Catalana de Scouts - Catalan Association of Scouts |
| Spain | Asociación de Scouts Independientes de Madrid - Independent Scouts of Madrid |
| Spain | Grupo Scout Alpha |
| Spain | Asosiación Juvenil Grupo Scout Independiente Gilwell |
| Spain | Federación Scout de la Comunidad Valenciana |
| Spain | Scouts Independientes del Principado de Asturias |
| Spain | Grupo Scout San Pío X |
| Spain | Asociación de Scouts Independientes de Córdoba |
| Spain | Grupo Scout Hotara |
| Spain | Grupo Scout Margyp |
| Spain | Grupo Scout Picos del Oso |
| Spain | Grupo Scout Espinardo |
| Spain | Grupo Scout Cicónidas 345 |
| Spain | Grupo Scout Aéreos Torrejón |
| Switzerland | Feuerkreis Niklaus von Flüe |
| Turkey | Kapif |
| United Kingdom | 1st Blackwater Valley Scout Group |
| United Kingdom | Baden-Powell Scouts' Association |
| United Kingdom | Phoenix Independent Scouts Association |
| United Kingdom | Scouts and Guides of Saint Joseph |
| Ukraine | Scout Association Rozvidnyk |

=== WFIS America ===
3643 members in 2010

| Country | Group |
|---|---|
| Argentina | Asociación Argentina de Scouts de Baden Powell |
| Argentina | Scouts Navales de Argentina |
| Bolivia | Asociación Boliviana de Scouts Independientes de Baden-Powell (ABSI-BP) |
| Brazil | Grande Fraternidade Escoteira IMPISA |
| Canada | Baden-Powell Service Association (Canada) |
| Chile | Agrupación Nacional de Boy Scouts de Chile |
| Chile | Hermandad Scout del Desierto Chile |
| Colombia | Exploradores de Rionegro |
| Colombia | Asociación Colombiana de Escultismo (ACE) |
| Costa Rica | Asociación Costarricense de Escultismo |
| Ecuador | Asociación de Boy Scouts del Ecuador |
| El Salvador | Asociacion de Scouts Independientes de El Salvador ASI-ES |
| Guatemala | Asociación de Escultismo Ecológico Baden-Powell Guatemala |
| Honduras | Asociación Hondureña de Escultismo Tradicional |
| Mexico | Agrupación Scout Mexicana, A.C. |
| Mexico | Federación Mexicana de Scouts Independientes, A.C. |
| Mexico | Asociación Tradicionalista de Scouts Tiro y Pesca, A.C. |
| Panama | Cuerpo de Exploradores Panameños |
| Paraguay | Hermandad Scout de Paraguay |
| Peru | Asociacion Scout Marianista |
| Peru | Asociación Independiente De Scouts Tradicionales Del Perú – AISTA Perú |
| United States | Outdoor Service Guides |

=== WFIS South-East Asia ===
| Country | Group |
|---|---|
| Bangladesh | Independent Scouts of Bangladesh |
| China | Shanghai Scout Association |
| South Korea | Third Eye Scouting Association |
| Pakistan | Independent Scouts of Pakistan |
| Pakistan | Nankana Sab Scout Organization |
| Pakistan | ADABKADA Scout Association |
| Sri Lanka | Independent Scouts of Sri Lanka |
| United Arab Emirates | United Arab Emirates Independent Scout Association |
| United Arab Emirates | Dubai Scout Organization |

== Jamborees and international camps ==
WFIS has held World Jamborees in Dinamarca 2002, Colombia 2007, and México 2011.

In addition to World Jamborees, the WFIS also regularly host regional international camps, such as Eurocamp. The following camps having taken place or are scheduled:

| Year | Event | Location, Country | Theme | Dates | Attendance | Countries |
|---|---|---|---|---|---|---|
| 2006 | Eurocamp 2006 | Switzerland | | | | |
| 2010 | Eurocamp 2010 | Germany | | | | |
| 2014 | Eurocamp 2014 | Italy | | | | |
| 2018 | Eurocamp 2018 | Newbury, Berkshire, United Kingdom | Lifelong friendships created by Scouting | 28 July to 4 August 2018 | 2030 | 21 |
| 2023 | Eurocamp 2023 | Germany | | 29 July to 5 August 2023 | 1300 | 16 |
| 2027 | Eurocamp 2027 | Italy | | | | |

WFIS also hosts a Jamboree On The Internet:

- WFIS-JOTI 2010, hosted by WFIS Africa

Member Associations also regularly invite each other to their own camps, examples including:

- The Baden-Powell Scouts' Association 2007 Centenary Camp
- Jamboree 2008 (Northumberland)

== International Scout Fellowship ==
International Scout Fellowship
- Country: Worldwide
- Founded: 2007-08-01
- Website isf-world.org

The International Scout Fellowship is an affiliate of WFIS, but not a member. It is open to former and current adult members of WFIS, to other adult friends of Independent Scouting who wish to contribute to independent Scouting, regardless of their Scouting backgrounds.

The ISF is governed by its World Council which is composed of representatives of each member chapter. It meets once a year, usually electronically. Its day-to-day affairs are directed by the executive committee, which is elected by the World Council. All positions in the ISF are staffed by volunteers. There are no paid employees.

Affiliated with the ISF is the US-based Rovering 4 Life Association.

=== Uniform ===
The badge is that of the WFIS in reverse colours. There is no set uniform of the ISF. Member chapters determine their own uniforms with the badge of the ISF. Other chapters may use casual dress such as T-shirts, etc.

The emphasis of the ISF is on tangible results in supporting Independent Scouting associations, not on formalities.

== See also ==
- The Scouting Portal
