= MGGA =

MGGA may refer to:

- Mannosylglucosyl-3-phosphoglycerate synthase, an enzyme
- Gallium(III) oxide
- Minnesota Grape Growers Association
- Malta Girl Guides Association
- Maldives Girl Guide Association
- Manitoba Grain Growers' Association
