= Jamboree 2008 (Northumberland) =

- Official badge
- Location: Green Carts, Humshaugh, Northumberland
- Country: United Kingdom
- Date: 16–22 August 2008
- Attendance: about 300
- Website http://www.jamboree.me.uk/

Jamboree 2008 was developed as "an Inter-organisational & International event" which was intended to "bring 600 young people from Scouting and Guiding together — to develop skills & friendships that will lay the foundations for the next 100 years of Scouting". The Jamboree was set up to be independent of Associations, and hoped to involve members of the World Federation of Independent Scouts (WFIS), the World Organization of the Scout Movement (WOSM), and the World Association of Girl Guides and Girl Scouts (WAGGGS).

Jamboree 2008 was held at Green Carts, Humshaugh, Northumberland and ran for eight days, between 16 and 22 August. The final day marked 100 years since Robert Baden-Powell met thirty Scouts at Fourstones Railway Station (about a mile south of Carr Edge) and marched them up to the camp site for the Lookwide Camp, accepted as the first official Scout Camp to be run by Baden-Powell.

== Purpose ==
Jamboree 2008 was established to be an event allowing young people from all the uniformed youth movements, including the Boys' Brigade, to work together whilst celebrating the centenary of the Humshaugh Camp The Jamboree was established independent of any Association, and was intended to be open to members of all Scouting organisations. It was hoped that the specialist training given to volunteer leaders would continue to affect the wider movement. It was also intended to highlight how Scouting has developed to meet the needs and interests of today's young people. Another intention was for the jamboree to develop links between the different Scouting organisations.

== Participation ==
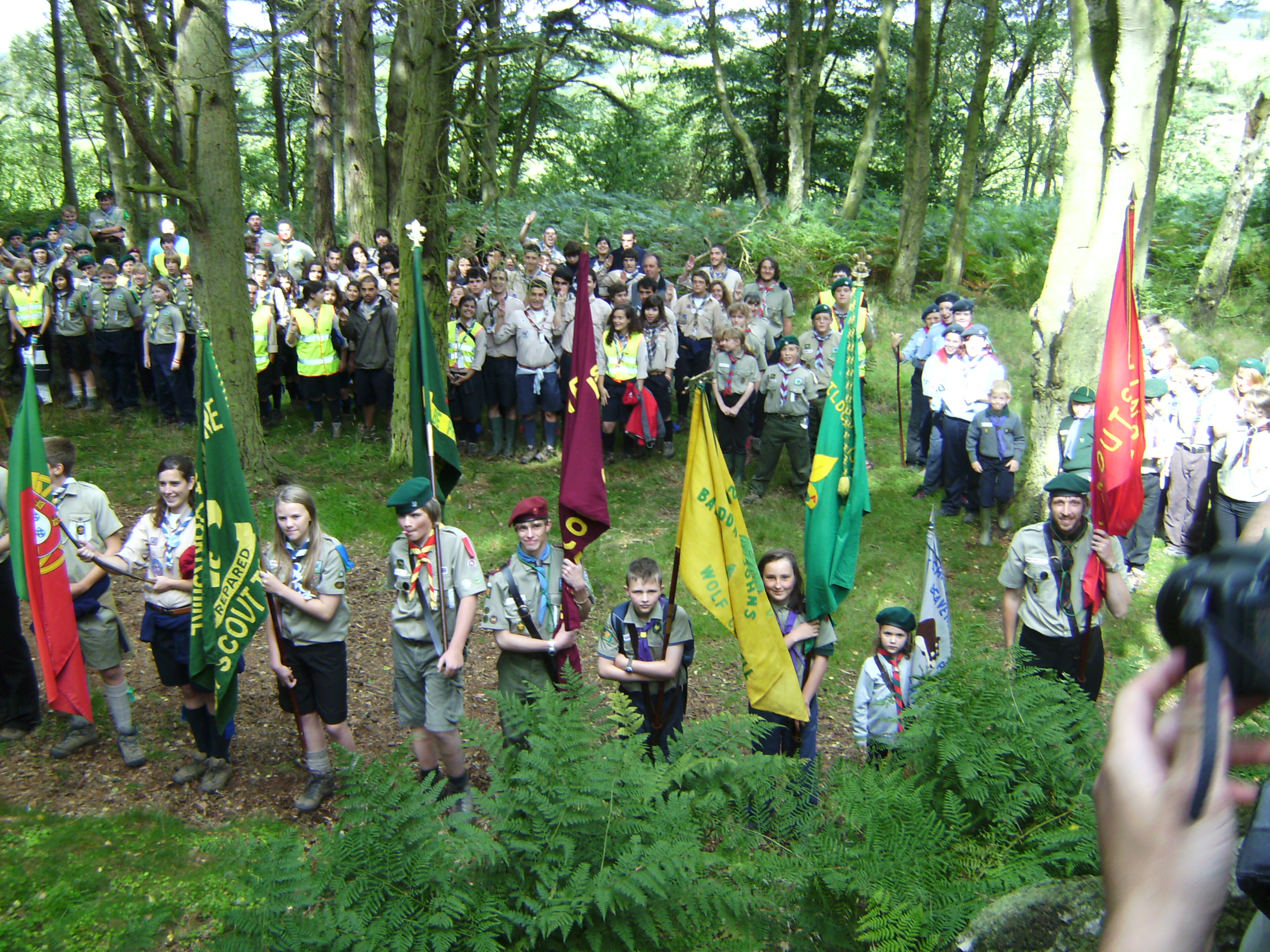
Jamboree members celebrating the centenary of B-P's first camp at Carr Edge

The event was attended by 600 Scouts from many parts of the United Kingdom and from Portugal. The majority of the attendees were from the Baden-Powell Scouts' Association, with local members of The Scout Association choosing to mark the centenary through a display in a local town rather than attending the event. Although the Scout Association decided not to support the event, they also did not issue a blocking statement, so a number of SA members attended.

Jamboree 2008 hosted the President of the Baden-Powell Scouts' Association, Lawrie Dring, one of the founding members of the BPSA and of WFIS. Johnny Walker — the author and publisher of the Scouting Milestones website also attended the event, bringing a display of memorabilia and giving talks on Scout history.

The event also welcomed a number of volunteers from outside of Scout organisations — these included friends, family and colleagues of the organisers and participants of The Duke of Edinburgh's Award. In line with the event's Child Protection policy, all adults were checked for their suitability to work with children by the Criminal Records Bureau.

== Events ==
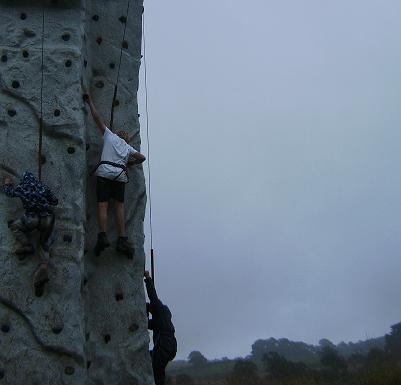
Rock climbing, Jamboree 2008

Despite heavy rainfall, the event proved a success by allowing the participants to access all manner of traditional Scouting activities including:

- Scouting history display
- Mountain biking
- Kayaking, canoeing and rafting
- Pioneering challenges
- Rock climbing and abseiling
- Hiking in the local area
- Tree walk (high ropes)
- Exploring Hadrian's Wall and local Roman ruins
- Arts and Crafts activities
- Swimming
- Sunrise Ceremony
- Centenary service at Hexham Abbey
- Flag rededication and commemoration at Baden-Powell's Carr Edge camp site

== Hubs ==
The Jamboree was divided into four hubs. These were named after patrols created by Baden-Powell at his camp, Bulls, Kangaroos, Ravens and Wolves.

== Training scheme ==
In addition to a week-long event, Jamboree 2008 embarked upon a training scheme which enabled the participating adult volunteers to access a number of training schemes including:

- British Canoe Union UKCC Level 1 award — a paddlesport coaching qualification (kayaking, canoeing, raft building).
- MLTE Single Pitch Award — a rock climbing instructor qualification
- Various e-learning training courses including the Safeguarding Children Level 1 certificate
- St Johns Ambulance; Appointed First aid with an extra module on Anaphlax
- Basic Food Hygiene award
- The institute of Qualified LifeGuards, National Pool Lifeguard Qualification Level 2

These qualifications were then utilised for the Jamboree 2008 camp itself. The goal of the training scheme was to develop a lasting legacy beyond the camp itself.

== Funding ==
The Jamboree 2008 project was set up as a not-for-profit event and so costs were intentionally kept to a minimum. This enabled the cost of the camp to be £50 per person for the week including all memorabilia and access to all events. In addition to this, centralised catering was made available for a cost of £37.50 per person for the week. The event aimed to be as inclusive as possible by keeping these costs as low as possible.

The project received additional funding from the following organisations:

- Northumberland National Park
- Awards for All
- Koolcash
- Durham County Council Foundation

== Media coverage ==
The event itself generated substantial media interest including various local and regional newspaper articles. The BBC 1 Look North Regional News spent the day at the campsite and filmed a midday and evening feature covering the Jamboree. In addition to the news presenter partaking in the activities alongside the Scouts, the weather forecast also took place from the water-logged campsite.

== Supporting Companies ==
The Jamboree 2008 project was supported by the following companies:

- Anchor Supplies
- MDT Interiors
- Carlton Exclusive
- Ken Hughes Courses - providing the BCU Level 1 course for water activities
- Coach2o
- Ezysite
- Greencarts Campsite
