= Scouting and Guiding in Malta =

The Scout and Guide movement in Malta is served by three organizations:

- The Malta Girl Guides Association, member of the World Association of Girl Guides and Girl Scouts
- The Scout Association of Malta, member of the World Organization of the Scout Movement
- Baden-Powell Scouts Malta, member of the World Federation of Independent Scouts

== History of Scouting in Malta ==
=== Organisation ===
Founded in 1908, The Scout Association of Malta (TSAM) is the largest Scouting organization in Malta. Its leaders and members are committed to further the ideals of Scouting in line with those as traditionally established by the youth movement's founder, Robert Baden-Powell, and as further developed by the World Organization of the Scout Movement (WOSM). TSAM is a youth-oriented non-governmental organisation (NGO). It is the only association in Malta which is recognised by the WOSM, and is also a member of the European Scout Region. Scouting, also known as the Scout Movement, is a worldwide youth movement with the stated aim of supporting young people in their physical, mental and spiritual development, so that they may play constructive roles in society.

=== Founding ===
Scouting began in 1907 when Robert Baden-Powell, a Lieutenant-General in the British Army, held the first Scouting encampment at Brownsea Island in England. Being part of the British Empire, Malta was one of the first countries where Scouting started.

The close connection the islands have with Baden-Powell started when he served in the rank of Captain as Assistant Military Secretary to his uncle, General Sir Henry Augustus Smyth, who then was Governor of Malta, between 1890 and 1893.

Scouting in Malta started in 1908, only one year after its establishment in Great Britain, and the Maltese Scouts were the first association formed outside of the British Isles, together with Australia, Ireland, New Zealand and South Africa. Maltese scout troops were officially recognised in 1909 and by the end of the year a total of 144 Scouts were enrolled in seven different troops. The 1st Sliema Scout Troop applied to be registered by The Boy Scouts Association of the United Kingdom on October 12, 1909, and, a year later in 1910, it was registered as the second overseas troop with The Boy Scouts Association. At this time there were 338 Boy Scouts and 3 Scoutmasters listed as members in Malta.

Chief Scout Baden-Powell returned many times to the island, including during a part of his delayed honeymoon with Lady Olave, in February 1913, and when he inspected six troops from Baracca, Dockyard, Floriana, Sliema, Tigne and Valletta. Baden-Powell recognised and shook hands with two of the Scouts he had tea with in London, during the Coronation in 1911.

On 15 September 1913, the Malta Boy Scouts Association was formally registered by Imperial Headquarters in London as an Overseas Branch of the Boy Scouts Association. The first known Maltese scout troop which was registered was the Sliema Land Scouts in September 1909 (the first Sliema Scout Group – Bernard's Own – is the oldest surviving active Scout group outside the UK and Australia; in 2009 they celebrated the 100th Anniversary of scouting in Malta), followed by Barracca Land Scouts in December 1911. The Boy Scouts Association formed a local association in Malta on 15 September 1913 which became The Boy Scouts Association Malta Branch.

The First World War, declared in August 1914, had a significant impact on Scouting on Malta, since most of the Scoutmasters were also British and Maltese servicemen, and who were ordered to the front in Europe. Within weeks of the declaration of hostilities, these Scouts from Malta were on their way to the Western Front. As camps were cancelled, the Scouts volunteered for war service as interpreters, in hospitals, in convalescent centres and in tea rooms, in the censor's office and as coast watchers and messengers. By November 1915, there were 84 scouts on war duty, 44 of whom had qualified for a special war badge. However, as the latter half of the war progressed, membership rose sharply, and the Association's general meeting on 30 November 1917, reported 1,200 members with 28 Scout troops on the island.

The first troop registered in Gozo was the Gozo Secondary School in November 1916.

On Sunday October 14, 1917, a rally for all scouts was held at Mosta. On parade were two district scoutmasters, 20 scoutmasters, 33 assistant scoutmasters, 115 patrol leaders and 625 scouts. The Chief Scout, Lord Methuen, presented warrants to the first Island Commissioner of the Malta Boy Scouts Association, Mr. E. Bonavia.

Allegations were made that Boy Scouts and Girl Guides Movements had an alliance with the Evangelical Alliance, whereas their members were Roman Catholics. Thus, in August 1925, a group of Scouts from the United Kingdom were going to Rome to meet with the Holy Father, including a party of thirty four Maltese Scouts. In his book Scouting in Malta: an Illustrated history (1989), John A. Mizzi states that Baden-Powell told the Scouts: "By your behaviour and good conduct, show to the heads of your Church in Rome that as Scouts you have not two masters but that your only Master is God and your Church. Your Scout masters are merely your elder brothers, showing you how better to do your duty as good Catholics. I want you to remember that and to obey the discipline of your Church."

Mizzi (1989) also states that on his last visit to Malta, Baden-Powell said: "I see a great change for the better in these boys as compared with the boys of the old days, now, as Scouts, they have interests, hobbies and aims in life and I would like your Scouters to realise that the time and energy which they put into Scouting is not thrown away; they are doing a big national service in giving their boys health of body, mind and spirit. They are thereby giving appreciable help respectively to the Church and Education."

Shortly before his death in 1940, Baden-Powell wrote in a final letter to the islands' Scouts: "to congratulate my old friends, the Maltese on the plucky way they have stood up to the infernal bombing of the Italians … They have the spirit of fearlessness and patience which enables them to face danger with a smile to stick it out to the triumphant finish …"

The Second World War saw similar service from the Maltese Scouts, as they supported the Allied forces throughout the aerial siege of 1940 to 1943. This resulted in The Boy Scouts Association's branch and its members receiving a collective award of the Bronze Cross, "in recognition of their courage and devotion to duty in the face of continuous enemy action in the war for freedom".

The Maltese Boy Scouts Association was then formed in October 1966, right after Malta became an independent nation earlier in 1964. In October 1966, an extraordinary general meeting of The Boy Scouts Association Malta Branch dissolved the branch and the Malta Boy Scouts Association was formed independent from The Scout Association of the United Kingdom. The Association became a member of the Boy Scouts International Conference in December 1966. The vice-president of the International Conference, Lady Olave Baden-Powell, presented the registration certificate to the Chief Scout of Malta. In the years which followed, the Association changed its name to The Scout Association of Malta (TSAM).

In 1966, the Association became an independent body and a full member of the World Organization of the Scout Movement (WOSM). In 1976 the name of the Association was re-styled as "The Malta Scouts Association", and by a further amendment of its Policy, Organisation and Rules (P.O.R.) of 31 October 1978, in order to comply with the provisions of Act XXII of 1978 of the Laws of Malta, the name of the Association was established as "THE SCOUT ASSOCIATION".

In 2007, TSAM inaugurated the Beaver section in its training programmes.

Since its foundation, Scouting has been one of the "most active and strongest youth organization on the Island" ("Brief History," 2012).

TSAM's motto in Maltese is Kun Lest, translating as 'Be Prepared' in English. The official logo and membership badge of TSAM features the Maltese eight-pointed cross and the Scout fleur-de-lis logo motif.

== History of Guiding in Malta ==
In 1909, the founder of the Scout Movement, Robert Baden-Powell held a rally for all the members of the movement in Crystal Palace, London. He remained undoubtedly impressed by the thousands of boys parading past him. He was even more surprised when a group of girls filed by. When asked who they were, the girls courageously answered "We are the Girl Scouts."

Exactly how many girl scouts turned up is unknown; yet, within months they had their own name and programme. Baden-Powell chose the name Girl Guides after the famous guide corps in India and it did not take long for them to make an impact. By 1910 Baden-Powell's sister Agnes had adapted Baden-Powell's book Scouting for Boys for the Girl Guides' use, and the Guide Movement was born. The same year, a newly retired Baden-Powell began to devote himself fully to Scouting and Guiding, and it was during a promotional tour that he met and married Olave Soames, who later became the World Chief Guide.

By 1911 and 1912 Girl Guiding and Girl Scouting had been introduced in many countries around the world including Canada, Denmark, Ireland, South Africa, Sweden, Bangladesh, Poland, India and Cyprus.

Girl Guiding started spreading throughout all the British Commonwealth countries, and so Guiding in Malta began in 1918 for British girls as part of The Guide Association (UK), when companies of British Guides were formed. In 1923, some Maltese girls became Guides and formed a separate division. The two divisions merged in 1938 to form one single body, although there were still some British Guides companies.

In 1945 the Malta Girl Guides were awarded their highest honor, the Bronze Cross, by the Award Committee in London for gallantry shown during WW2.

As Malta gained independence in 1964, Guiding activities continued to gain strength. In 1966, two years after the independence of Malta, the Malta Girl Guides Association (MGGA) became an associate member of the WAGGGS. The MGGA is the sole national Guiding association of Malta, and it became a member of the World Association of Girl Guides and Girl Scouts (WAGGGS) in 1966.

The MGGA gained full WAGGGS-membership in 1972, and the last groups of British Guides left the island in 1978.

The girls-only association has 1,337 members (as of 2003).

The aim of the association is to "enable young girls and young women to develop good character formation and to discover their potential through an interactive programme giving a positive sense of direction and a world of opportunities as responsible citizens".

The association is divided in four age groups:

- Dolphins (ages 5 to 7)
- Brownies (ages 7 to 10)
- Guides (ages 10 to 14)
- Rangers (ages 14 to 18)

The program is divided into eight areas:

- Environment
- Skills
- Culture and Heritage
- Health
- Creativity
- Local & International Guiding
- Service
- Mind & Spirit
