= Scouting and Guiding in Guatemala =

Scout and Guide movement in Guatemala

The Scout and Guide movement in Guatemala is served by:

- Asociación Nacional de Muchachas Guías de Guatemala, member of the World Association of Girl Guides and Girl Scouts
- Asociación de Scouts de Guatemala, member of the World Organization of the Scout Movement
- Scouts Independientes de Guatemala (Scouts Baden Powell de Guatemala), member of the World Federation of Independent Scouts
- Asociacion de Heraldos de Baden Powell

== International Scouting units in Guatemala ==
In addition, there are American Boy Scouts in Guatemala City, linked to the Direct Service branch of the Boy Scouts of America, which supports units around the world.
