= Bâtie-Beauregard =

Swiss medieval castle ruins

- Near Versoix in Switzerland
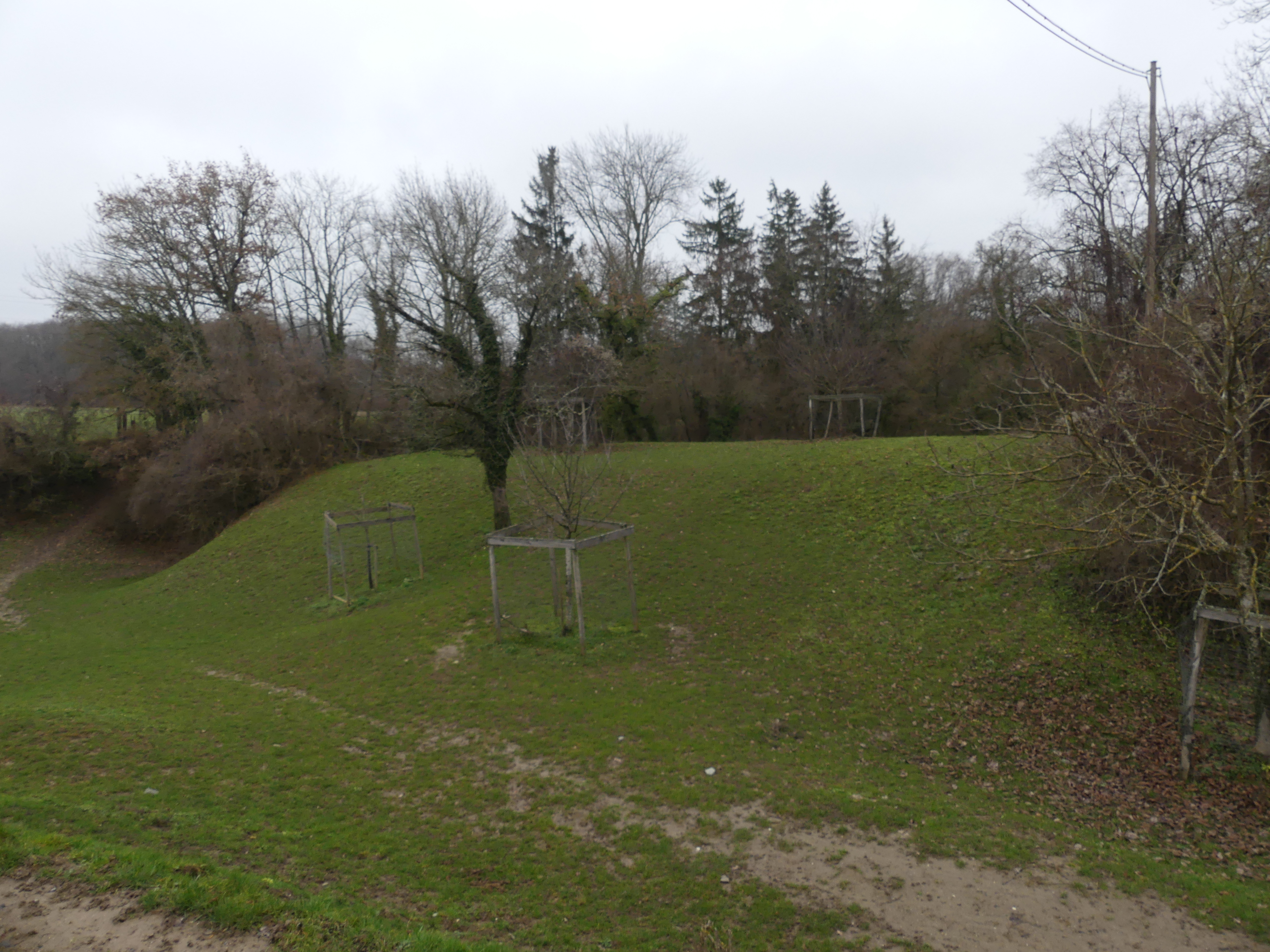
- The former castle hill

Site information
- Type: Hill castle
- Owner: Private
- Open to the public: No
- Condition: Ruined
- Website: www.golf-vieille-batie.ch

Location
- Location within Canton of Geneva
- Coordinates: 46°17′27.56″N 6°7′10.53″E

Site history
- Built: 1278
- Demolished: 1590

The Bâtie-Beauregard - which can be translated from French as "building with a beautiful gaze" - is a ruined hill castle in the municipality of Collex-Bossy and one of the few remnants of a medieval castle in what is now the Canton of Geneva in Switzerland.

== Name ==
The fortress used to carry the names Bâtie-Champion after the noble family of de Champion, who were the main owners until the end of the 16th century, and Bâtie-sur-Versoix because of its geographic location, respectively. In later times the place of its ruines was simply called La Bâtie or La Bastie and most recently La Vieille Bâtie ("the old building").

== Description ==
The complex consisted of two parts: the larger one on the western side hosted a barn, some annexes and a garden for agricultural supplies. The rectangular area was surrounded by a moat.

The rock castle itself was built to the east of that part on a rock formation which defined its structure. That location was strategic since it towered over the embankment of the Versoix to its East and South and the forest hills on the other side of the river. It was secured against the high plain on its northern side and separated from the agricultural supply part to its western side by a moat, accessible only over a drawbridge there. On the southern side of the fortress above the steep slope were the residential buildings and the tower, which was laid out in a square. This bergfried had a diameter of some eight meters. The entire eastern side towards was occupied by rooms as well, including the kitchen, and fortified by brick-structures on the rock bases. All those details were written down in a court-case from 1541 against burglars who had tried to break into the castle by climbing through a window.

Below the fortress was a bridge over the river. The castle was thus well-suited to defend the area west of the Versoix:

== History ==
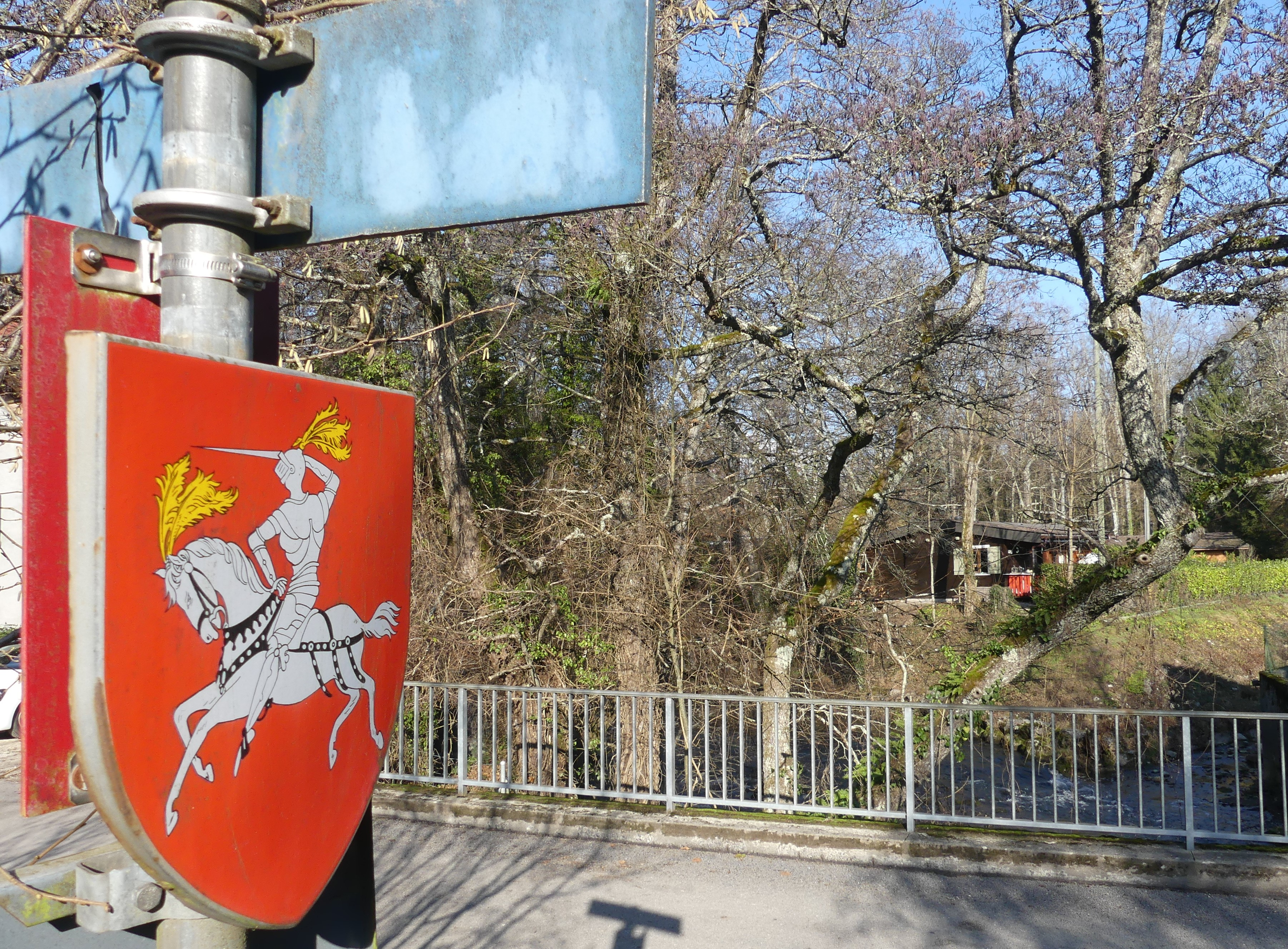
Coat of arms of Collex-Bossy at the Versoix bridge of La Bâtie

=== Medieval times ===
The Swiss archaeologist Louis Blondel (1885–1967), who served as the first director of Geneva's cantonal archaeological service, argued that strategic location had probably been used as a military installation already before the end of the 13th century. However, there is no evidence for that thesis, also because the site was never systematically excavated.

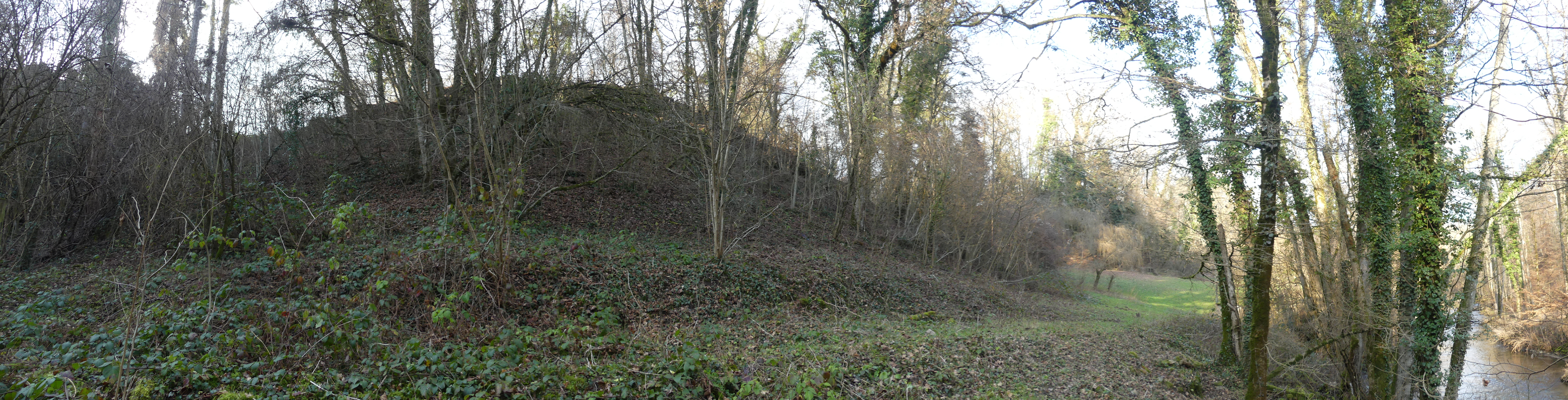
The castle hill above the Versoix

The fortress was first mentioned in a document in 1299. Blondel estimated that it was constructed around 1278. Its geopolitical context was the decades-long power-struggle for the hegemony over the territory of and around Geneva between the lords of Faucigny, the counts of Geneva, the House of Savoy and the lords of the manor of Gex. The latter were the overlords of the area and granted the fief subsequently to their vassals. They were the noble families of de Compey, de Menthon, de Champion and de Crose, who were related with or in-laws of each other. The castle was for more than three centuries the stone-hewn testimonial of the feudalism that dictated the living conditions of the population in that region.

In 1353, the troops of Amadeus VI, Count of Savoy, conquered the Pays de Gex. He and his successors continued to let the area be administered by the above-mentioned vassals. Little is known about the events and developments around the castle until the end of the Late Middle Ages at the beginning of the 16th century.

=== Modern times ===
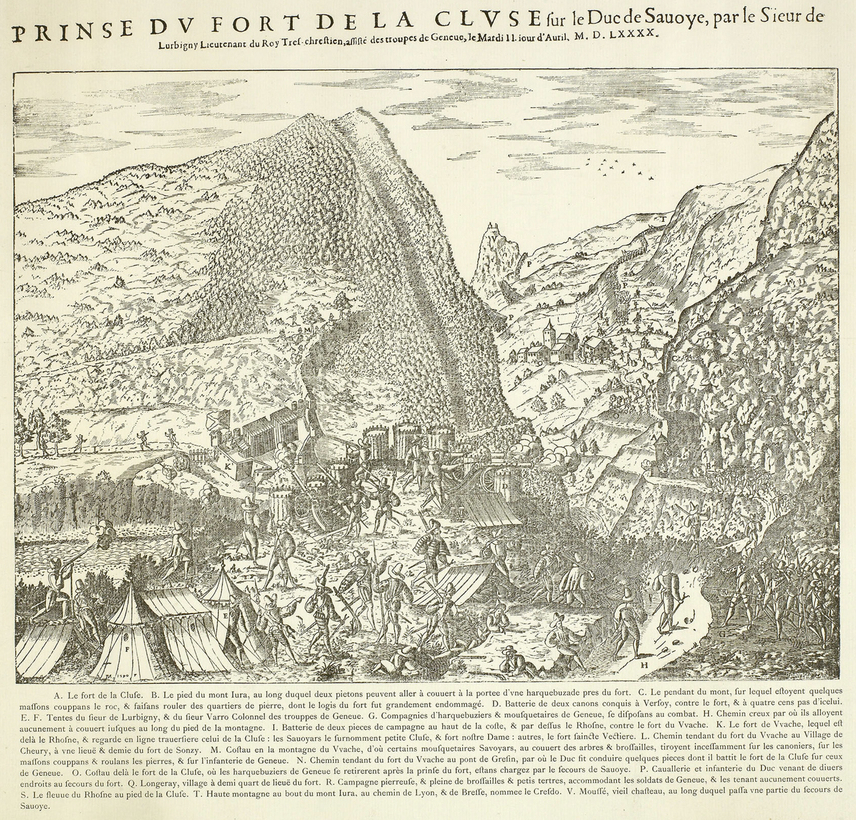
Contemporary depiction of the capture of the Fort de la Cluse by Lieutenant Lurbigny three months after his capture of the Bâtie-Beauregard

When Geneva joined the Protestant Reformation in 1536 and declared itself an independent republic, the power-struggles in the region once again escalated. In the same year, the troops of Bern occupied the Pays de Gex. Eleven years later, they upgraded the fief of Collex to a Barony. Following the 1564 treaty of Lausanne, the area returned to Savoy.

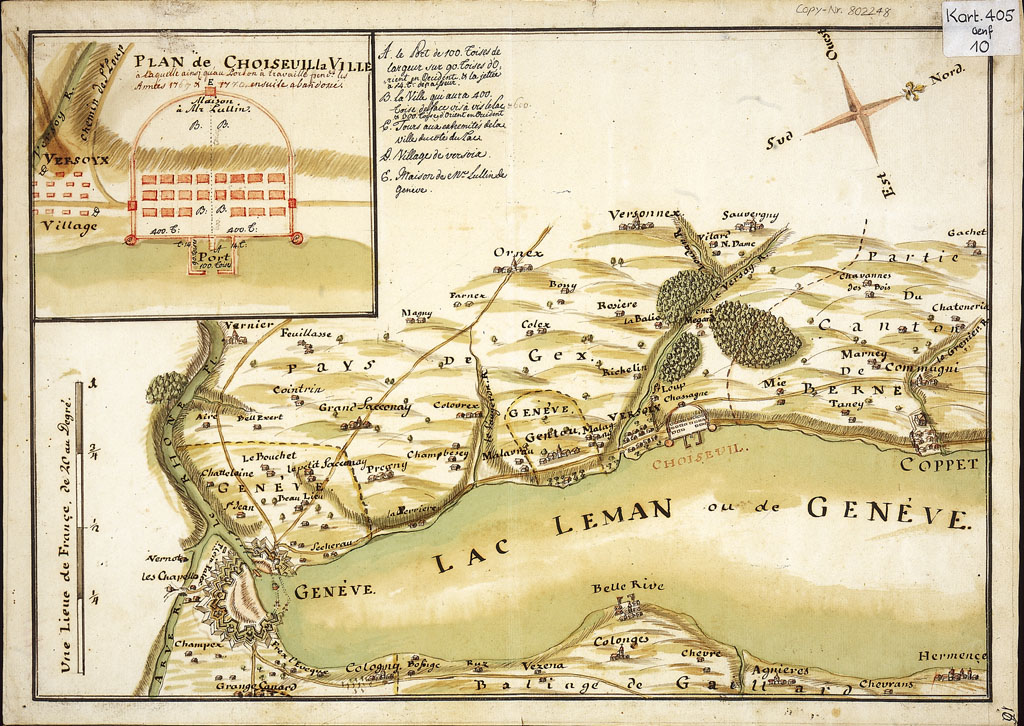
"La Bâtie" on a map from the 1770s

Under the rule of the Savoyard vassals of the de Crose family, who had become the owners of the castle thanks to a marriage with a member of the house of Champion, the fortress became a center of partisans who resisted the expansionist ambitions of Geneva in the 1589 war.

On 1 January 1590, troops from Genevamade made a first attempt to conquer the fortress but were repelled by a hail of stones. One week later, a French officer who was called Lurbigny and served in Geneva's forces conducted a reconnaissance mission with 50 mounted soldiers. During the night from 11 to 12 January, a Genevan force of one cavalry platoon and four infantry companies with four or six canons launched another attack. According to records from Geneva, the assault lasted from four o'clock in the morning until two o'clock in the afternoon. When the artillery, which the Genevans had just captured during the conquest of Versoix, succeeded in breaching the walls, the castle lord Claude de Crose with his family and some twenty fighters surrendered. Still, they were allowed to leave the castle with their weapons and possession. The attackers still made plentiful of booty, took away all usable items, and started demolishing the fortifications. The costs of the military mission amounted to 150 Florentine gold coins which underlines the military importance of the castle.

In the 1601 Treaty of Lyon, Sayvoy relinquished the Pays de Gex - including Collex - to France which pressured Geneva to withdraw from the area.

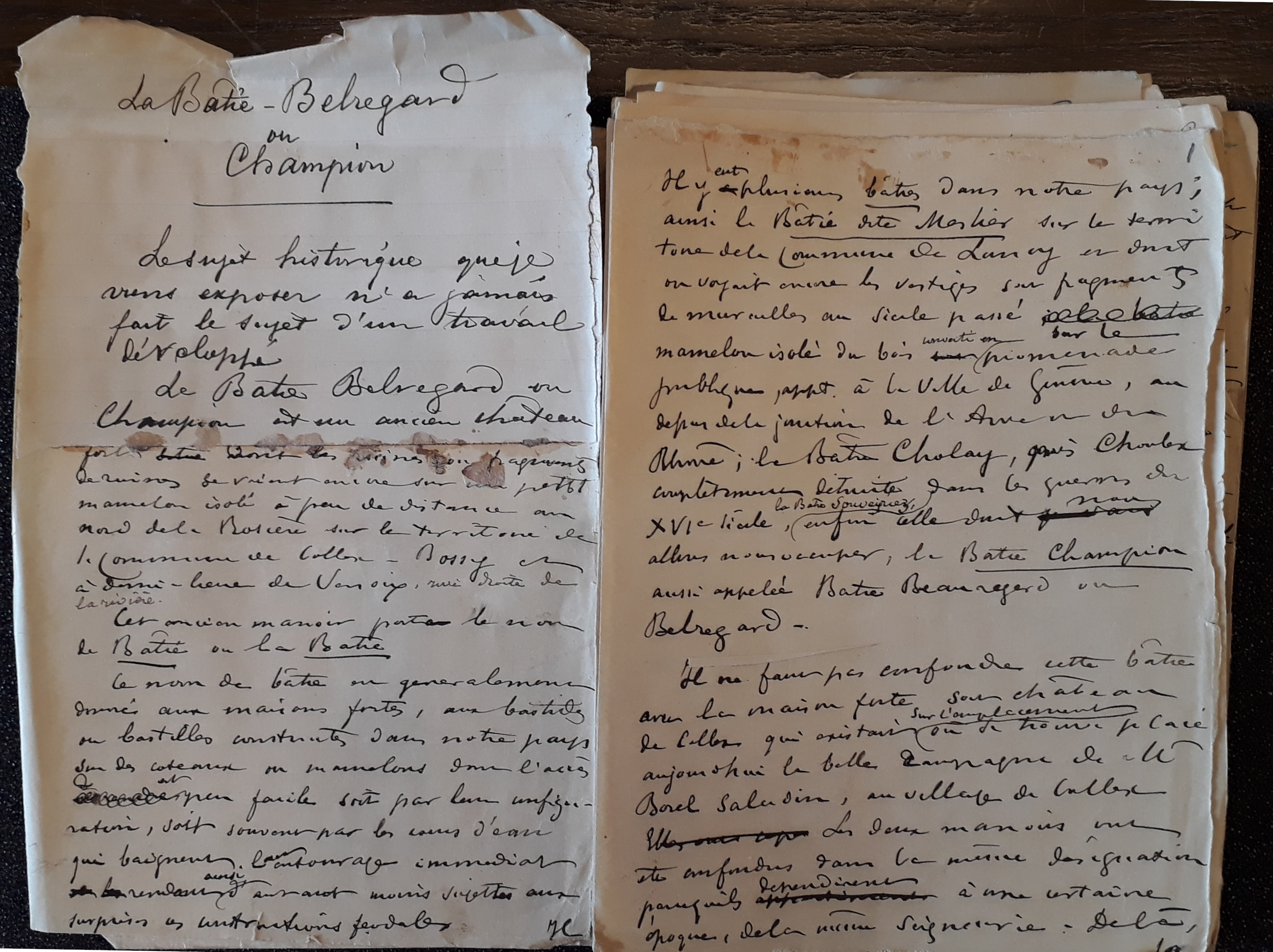
Fontaine-Borgel's manuscript

In 1641/42, the lawyer Michel de Gillier purchased both the land and the title of Baron de Bâtie-Beauregard from the heiress of the de Champion and de Crose families.

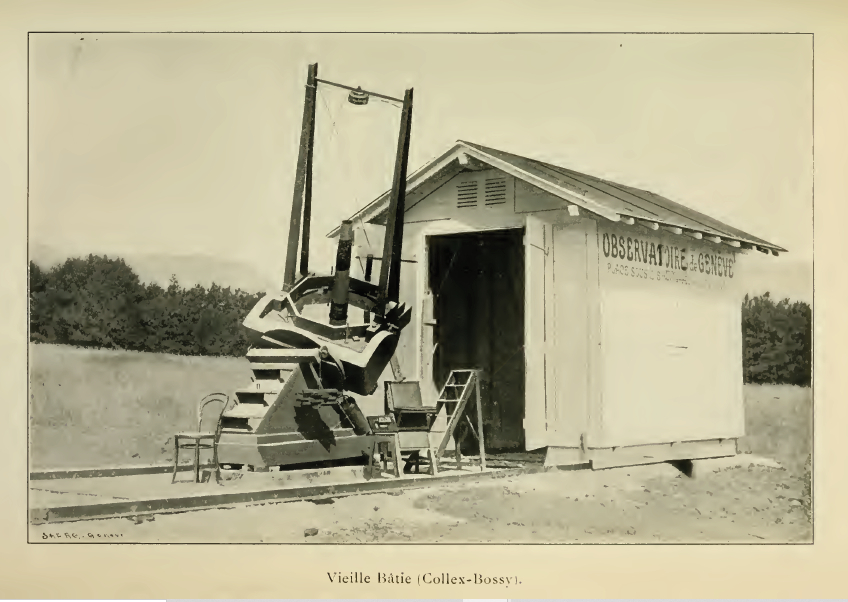
The mobile telescope in 1911

In 1719, David Vasserot, who was a son of the Huguenot banker Jean Vaserot war and married into the Genevan Turrettini family of theologians, purchased the title and land of La Bâtie. His descendants remained the owners until the 19th century. Following the 1815 Treaty of Paris, France relinquished Collex and five other municipalities to the canton of Geneva which was thereby connected through a land passage with the main land body of Switzerland. At the end the 19th century, the historian Claudius Fontaine-Borgel, who worked as a secretary at the town hall of Versoix, started writing a history of the Bâtie-Beauregard. The manuscript, which has been kept in the archives of the Bibliothèque de Geneve, was never published, but obviously served as the basis for later historiography of the place.

At the same time, technological modernity rapidly reached La Vieille Bâtie: firstly, the owners of the farm next to the castle ruins installed a water turbine at a canal next to the Versoix in order to generate electricity. For the construction of the farm buildings they used the former fortress as a quarry. The small hydroelectric power plant is still in use today. Soon afterwards, in 1903, the estate was purchased by Antoine Maréchal, who hailed from Collex-Bossy and became rich as a real estate broker in Argentina.

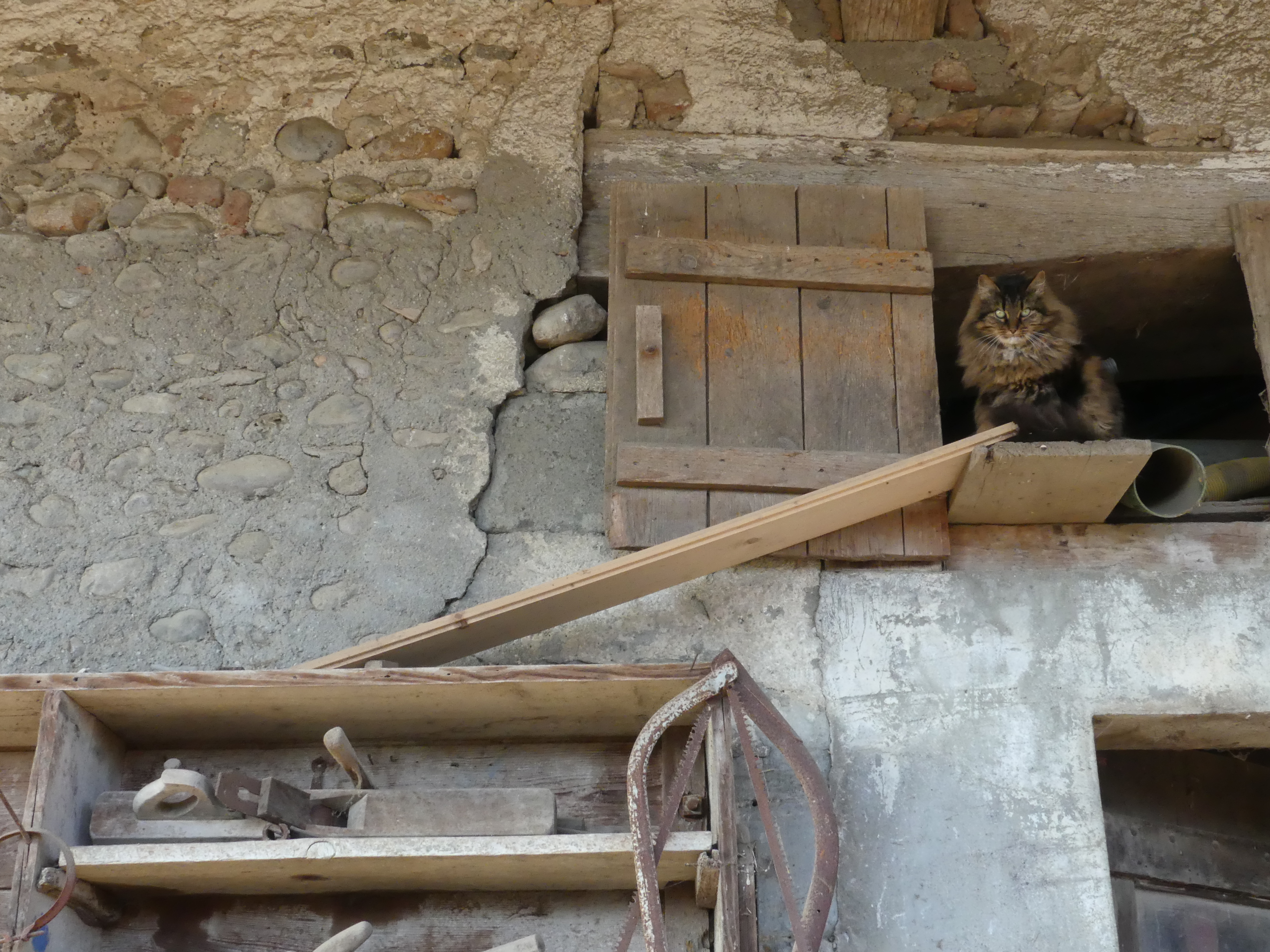
Barn wall of castle stones

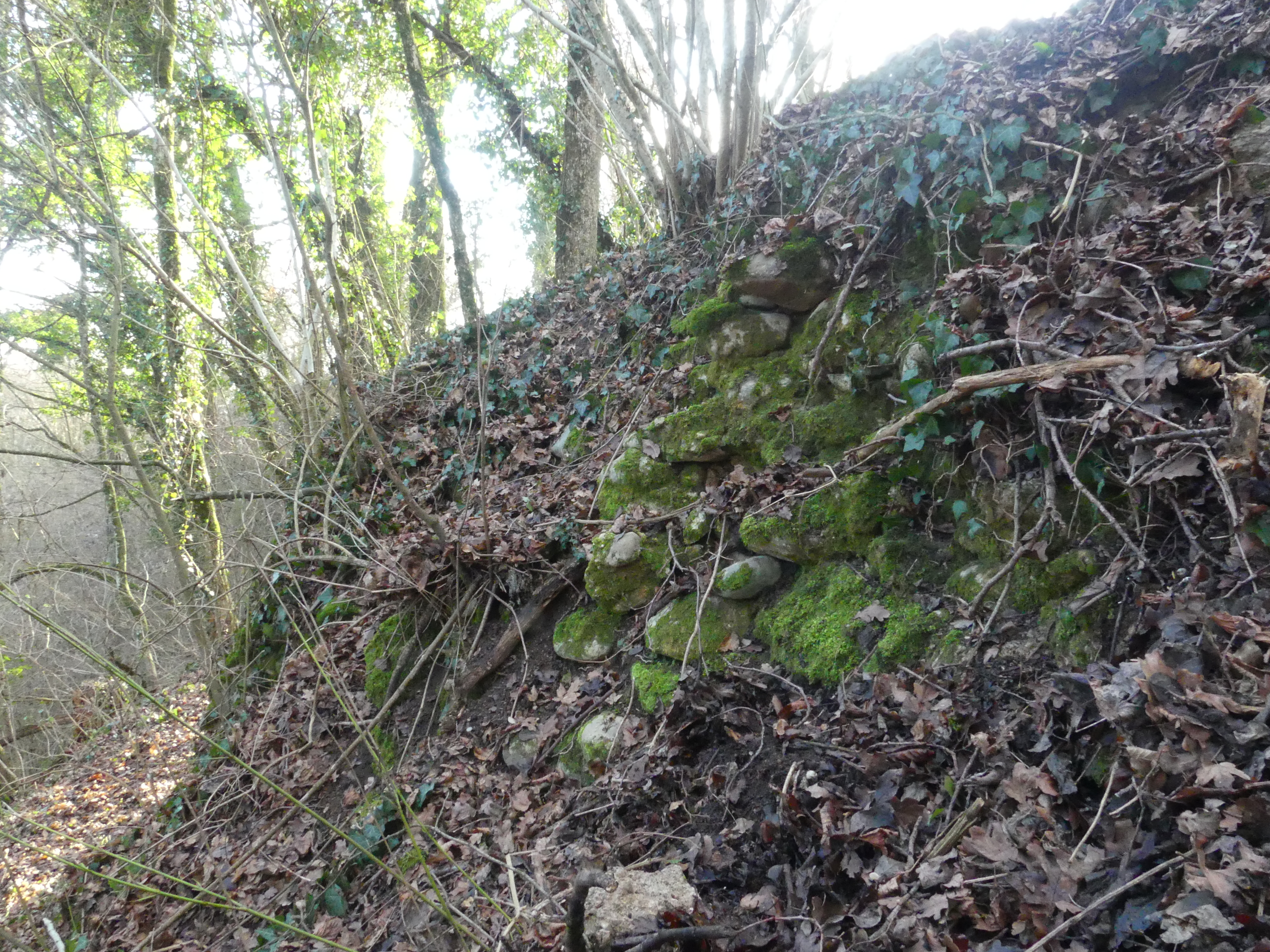
The last visible ruins

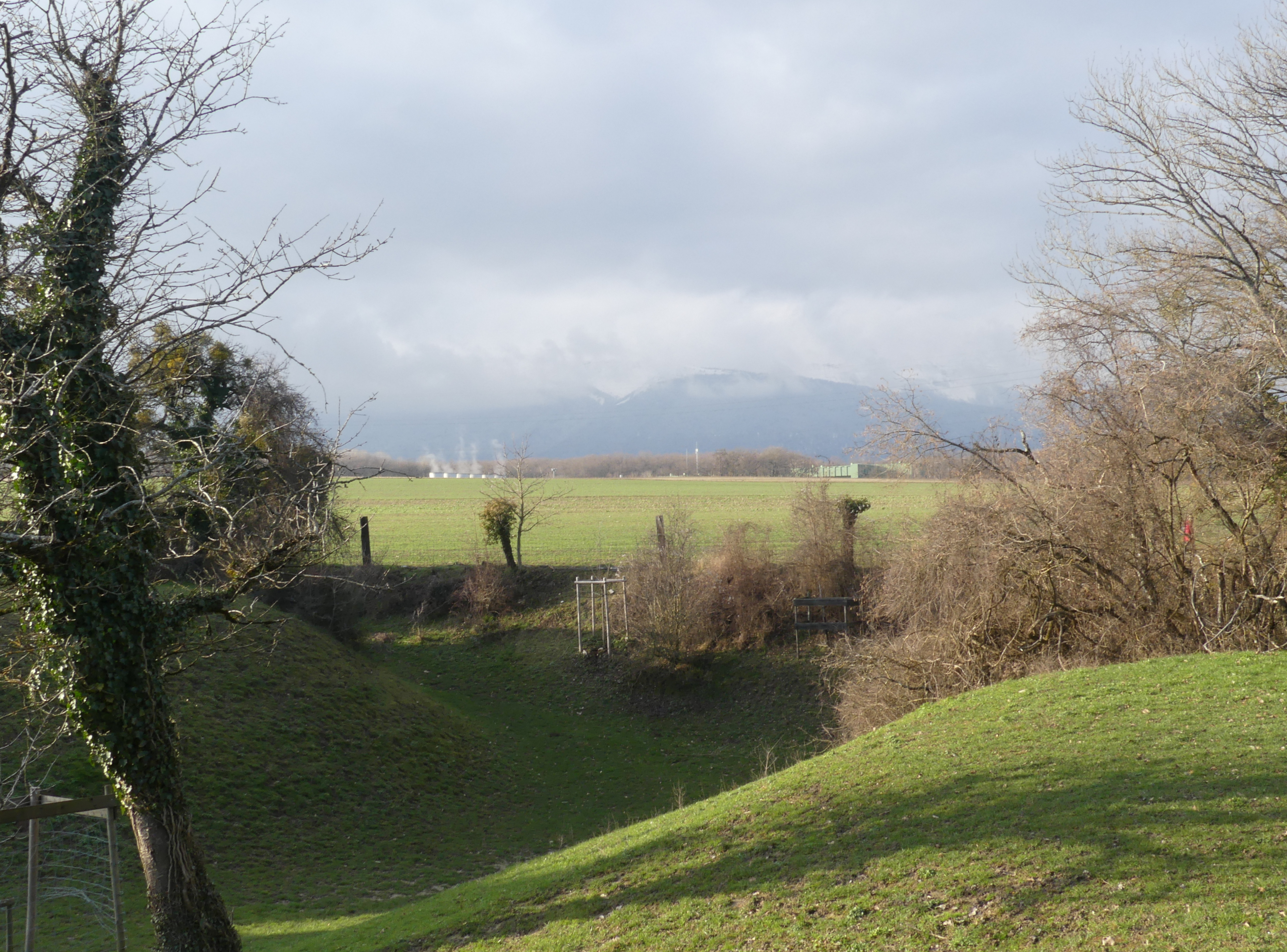
View over the moat on Point 6

In late 1910, Maréchal, who had just been elected as mayor of Collex, leased a field right next to the former fortress complex to the Geneva section of the Swiss aviation association. The site became one of Switzerland's very first aerodromes, less than a decade after the invention of powered aircraft, and was used as a base by pioneering aviators like François Durafour (1888-1967), who originated from Bossy. From July until September 1911, Maréchal also let the astronomers of the Geneva Observatory use the field for studies with a mobile telescope.

The use of the aerodrome was given up, however, after the beginning of the First World War in 1914 due to its very close proximity to the border with France. In 1919, the Great Council of the Canton of Geneva chose the extended area for the construction of a modern airport, but shortly afterwards opted instead for Cointrin as its site, since a number of land owners in Collex-Bossy demanded high prices and the proposed expropriations were expected to be met with lengthy court cases.

The Decrest family, which was the heir of Maréchal after his death in 1919, sold the estate instead in 1922 to Gottfried Baumgartner. He originated from the Emmental valley in west central Switzerland and settled in Collex-Bossy along with a number of other farmer families from the canton of Bern which encouraged them with financial support to emigrate to other parts of the country. The last remnants of the castle were still quite visible until then. They were, however, further used as a quarry in subsequent years and disappeared almost completely. Many of its stones were used for the construction of a barn at the farm in the former western part of the complex and are still visible there.

Two decades later, the former military installation which for centuries had been a manifestation of feudalist rule became a sanctuary for people who fled from the terror regime of nazism: During the German military administration in occupied France during World War II (1940-1944) many Jews and other refugees from Nazi persecution, who escaped across the nearby border, were given overnight shelter by the Baumgartner family. When Gottfried's wife Rosa went to the Swiss authorities to protest against arrests of refugees, she was prosecuted by a military tribunal and temporarily imprisoned for her humanitarian commitment. It took the Swiss government half a century to rehabilitate her for that injustice.

The former castle hill is now part of a horse pasture and not openly accessible for the public. The Baumgartner family as the owners of the farm has also run a golf training course in an adjacent area since 2000. The exclusive "Golf de Geneve" club tried to purchase the land in the late 1960s. Its president back then happened to be the lawyer Pierre Turrettini - a descendant of the same family which purchased the title and land of La Bâtie 250 years earlier.

During the early 2000s, the European Organization for Nuclear Research (CERN) constructed the "Point 6" of its gigantic Large Hadron Collider (LHC) less than 500 meters to the Northwest of the former fortress right next to the main field of La Vieille Bâtie. In the mid-1990s, the municipal council of Collex-Bossy had declined to approve of CERN's plan to set up the installation on its territory, since there had been massive protests by the local population. However, the tunnel ring of 26.6 kilometers length which primarily collides proton beams almost at the speed of light was still partly built underneath the Western part of Collex-Bossy. And the complex of "Point 6" was instead constructed by the international collaborative project in the French commune of Versonnex, right next to the border with Switzerland and the Baumgartner's estate. It is

"the end of the road for the particles. After circulating in the ring for 10 hours, the beams are absorbed by enormous blocks of graphite known as beam dumps."

== Gallery ==
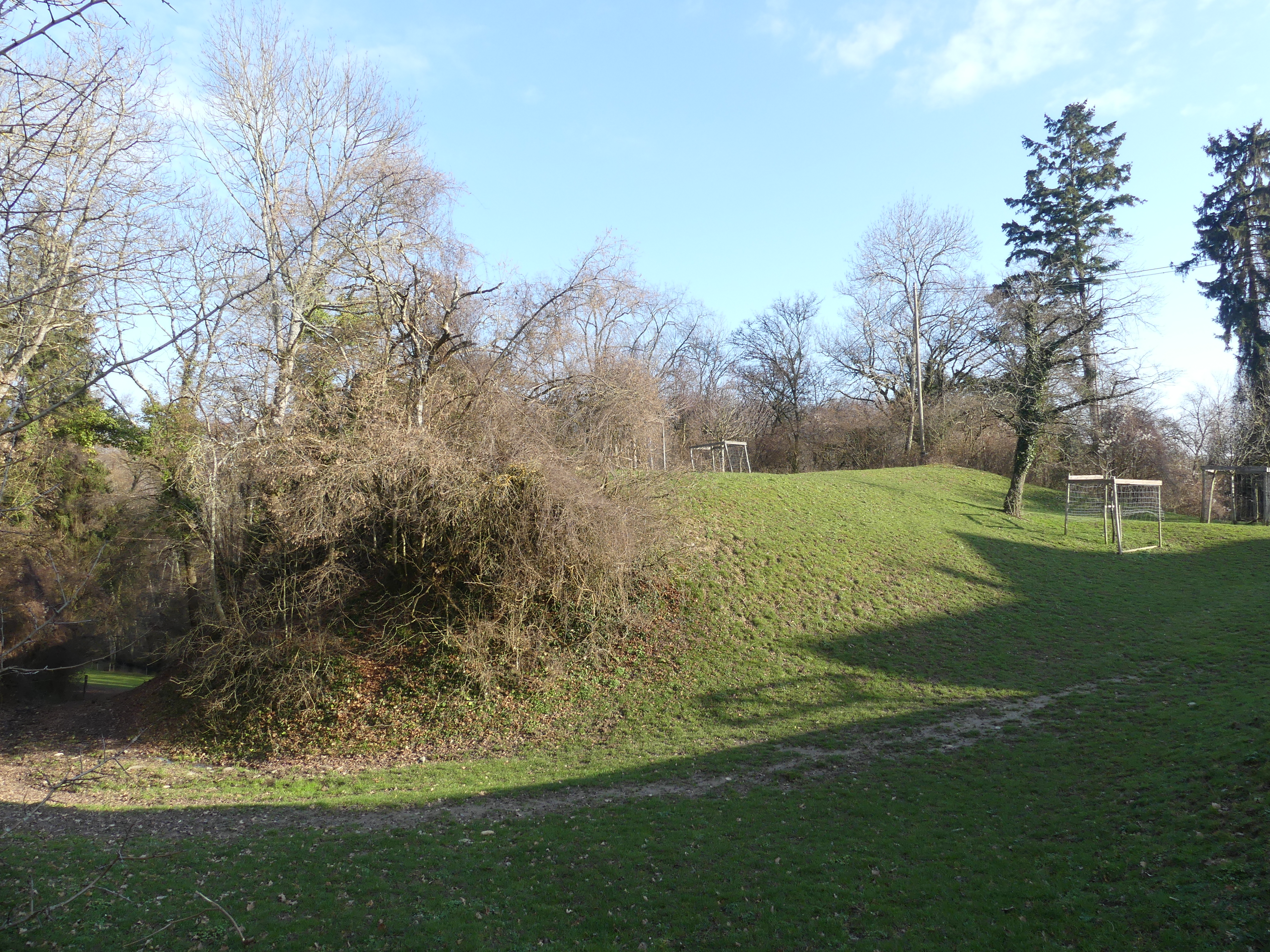
The Western side of the castle hill

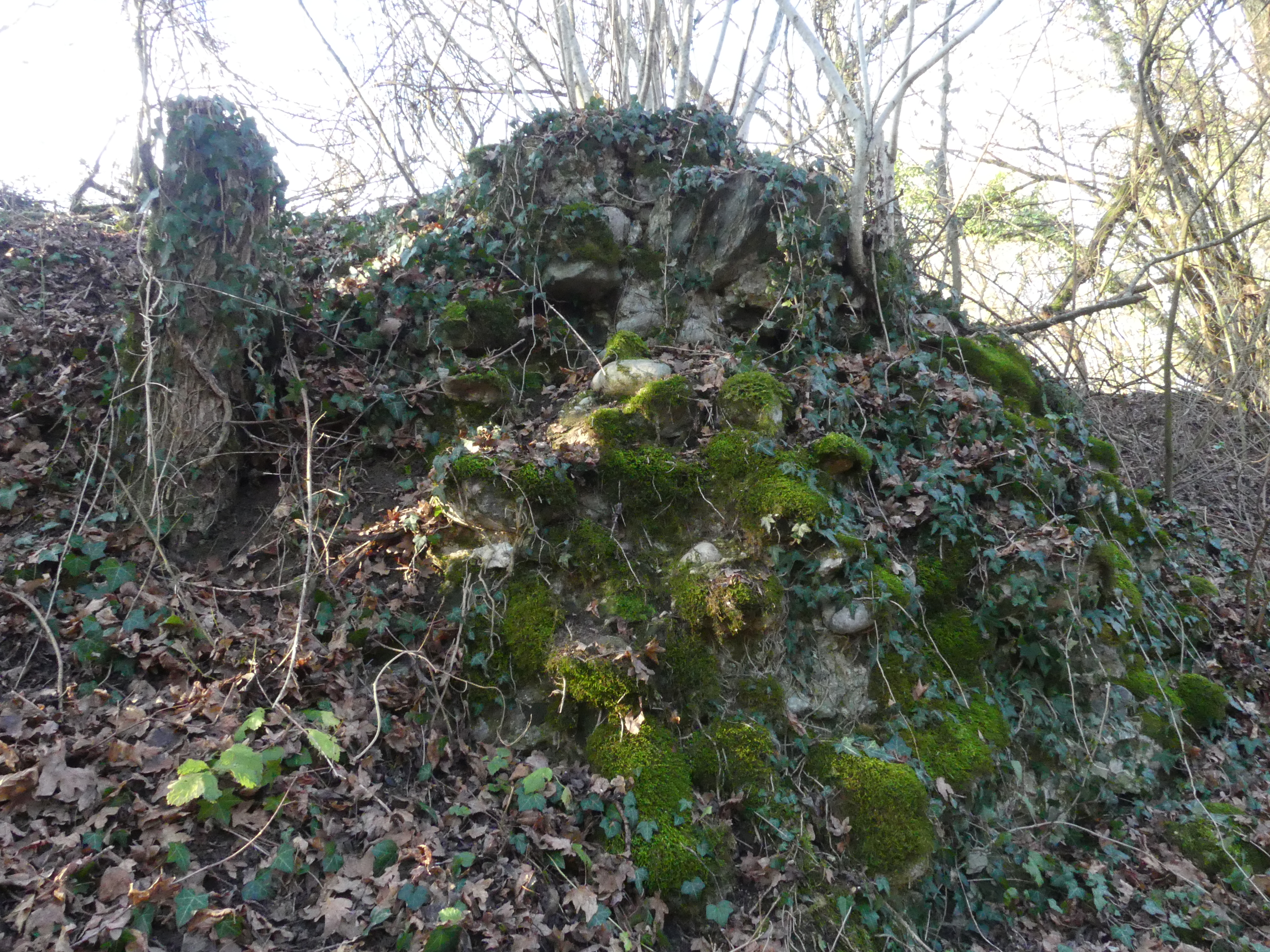
The Eastern side of the tower ruins

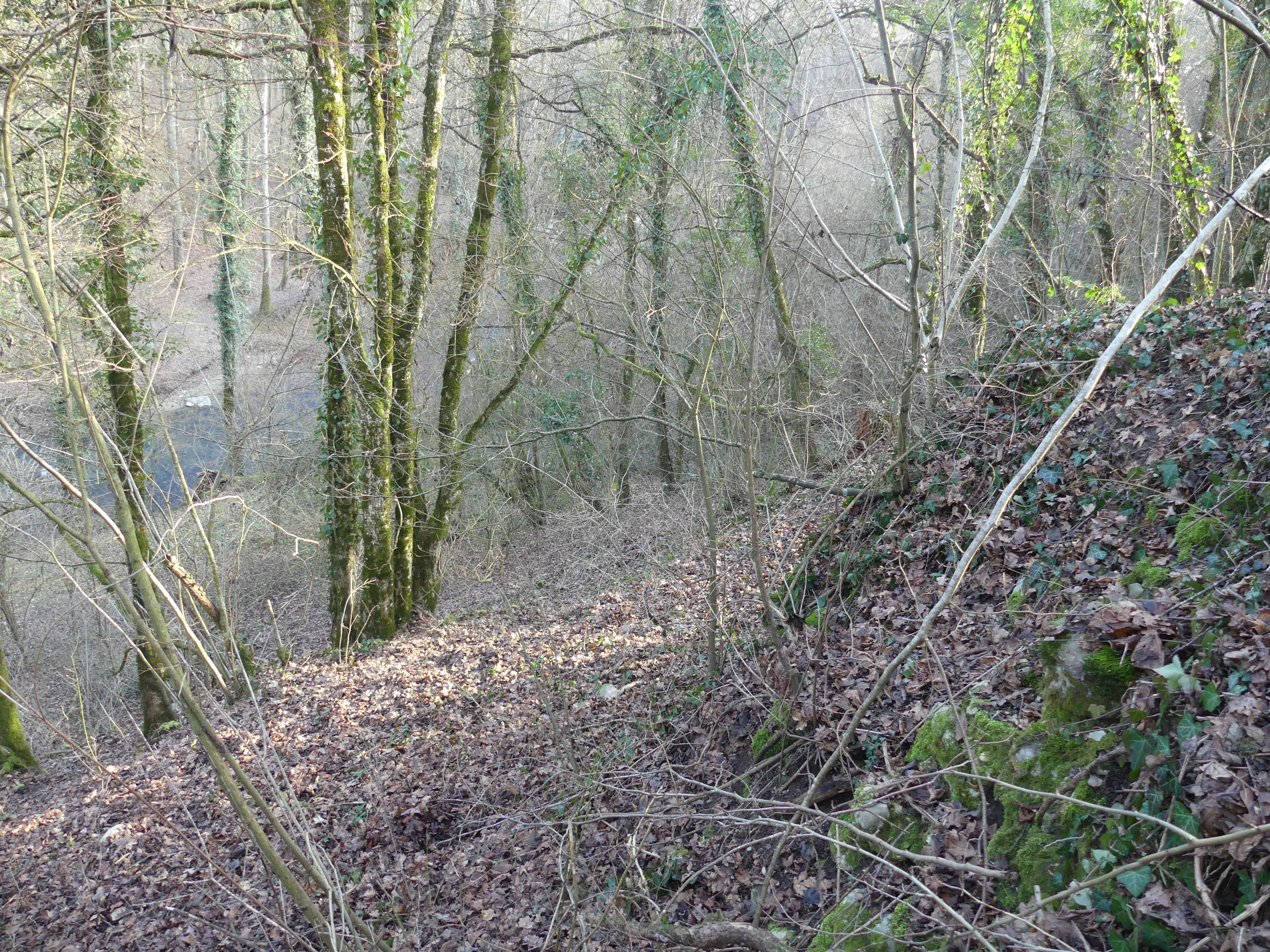
View over the tower ruins on the Versoix

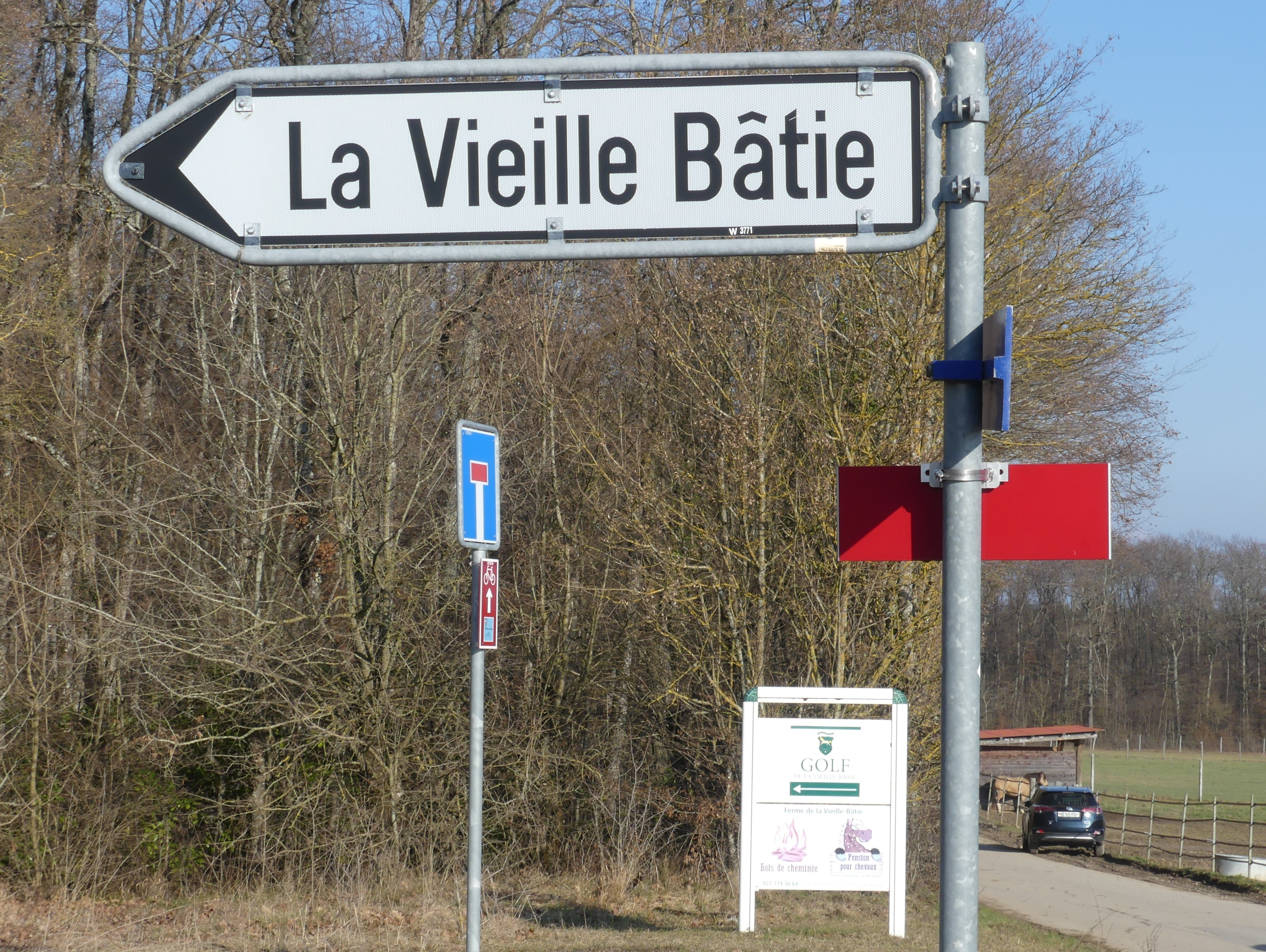
Signpost at the Route de Rosière
