= Scouting and Guiding in Costa Rica =

Scouting and Guiding movement in Costa Rica

The Scout and Guide movement in Costa Rica is served by

- Asociación de Guías y Scouts de Costa Rica, member of the World Association of Girl Guides and Girl Scouts and of the World Organization of the Scout Movement
- Scouts Independientes de Costa Rica, prospect member of the World Federation of Independent Scouts

== International Scouting units in Costa Rica ==
In addition, there are American Boy Scouts in San José, linked to the Direct Service branch of the Boy Scouts of America, which supports units around the world.
