= Scouting and Guiding in India =

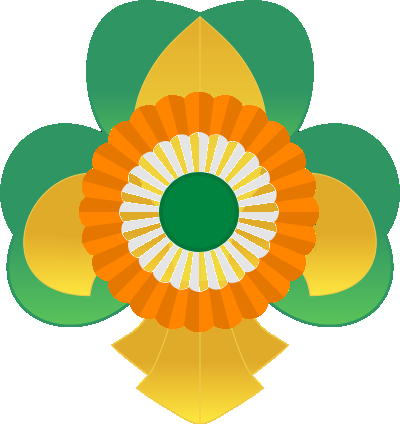

Scouting and Guiding in India have a long history.

== Organisations ==
The Scout and Guide movement in India is served by:

- The Bharat Scouts and Guides (BSG), member of the World Association of Girl Guides and Girl Scouts and the World Organization of the Scout Movement. The national headquarters of BSG is recognised by the Government of India.
- Global Movement of Green Scouts in New Delhi
- The Scouts/Guides Organisation, Pan-Indian organization, recognized by the Government of India, about 1.5 million Scouts and Guides
- Federation of India for Sports, Scouting, and Education, member of the World Federation of Independent Scouts
- Hindustan Scouts And Guides Association, member of the World Federation of Independent Scouts, founded in 1928; connected to the Rashtriya Swayamsevak Sangh
- The All India Boy Scouts Association
- Scouts/Guides, India Organization, founded in 2017

== Indian Scout and Guide Fellowship ==
The Indian Scout and Guide Fellowship is a voluntary, non-political, social service organisation of adults in India who were once Scouts or Guides in their young days or those who have been leaders in the active movement or those who wish to support the active movement with their resources or spirit of service.

The Fellowship was established in 1959 and is affiliated to the International Scout and Guide Fellowship headquartered in Brussels, Belgium. The Indian Fellowship has state branches, district units and guilds in many states of India.

The Fellowship maintains close links at all levels with the active movement and keeps rapport with the National Headquarters of the Bharat Scouts and Guides and its state and district branches through India. The Fellowship also organises seminars and symposiums on subjects of national importance, organisational excellence and personal development. Members choose to work hand-in-hand with Scouts, Guides and other fellow members and help to organise service activities on special days and occasions. These activities are meant to serve the community as well as young boys and girls.

== International Scouting units in India ==
In addition, there is a Cub Scout pack and an older BSA Scout troop via Boy Scouts of America in New Delhi, linked to the Far East Council of the Boy Scouts of America, which supports units around the world.
