= Scouting and Guiding in the United Arab Emirates =

The Scout and Guide movement in the United Arab Emirates is served by

- Girl Guides Association of the United Arab Emirates, member of the World Association of Girl Guides and Girl Scouts
- Emirates Scout Association, member of the World Organization of the Scout Movement.

== International Scouting units in the United Arab Emirates ==
In addition, there are American Boy Scouts in Dubai, linked to the Direct Service branch of the Boy Scouts of America, which supports units around the world, as well as British Scouts.
