= Scouting in Korea =

The Scout movement in South Korea is served by the Girl Scouts Korea, member of the World Association of Girl Guides and Girl Scouts and the Korea Scout Association, member of the World Organization of the Scout Movement.

== International Scouting units in South Korea ==
There are two organizations focused on serving children of American military families living in South Korea and elsewhere in eastern Asia and the western Pacific: Girl Scouts of the USA, serviced by the USA Girl Scouts Overseas—West Pacific, and Boy Scouts of America (BSA), serviced by the Korea District of the Far East Council. These councils serve BSA and GSUSA units serving children of diplomatic, business and military personnel, and international units run under their auspices.

== North Korea ==
North Korea shared a common Scout history with South Korea until 1950, but at present is one of only four of the world's independent countries that do not have Scouting. North Korea instead has a Pioneer Movement, the Young Pioneer Corps.
