= Louis Blondel =

Swiss archeologist (1885–1967)

- Born: 24 November 1885; Geneva, Switzerland
- Died: 17 January 1967 (aged 81)
- Occupation: Archaeologist
- Known for: First director of the cantonal archaeological service in Geneva

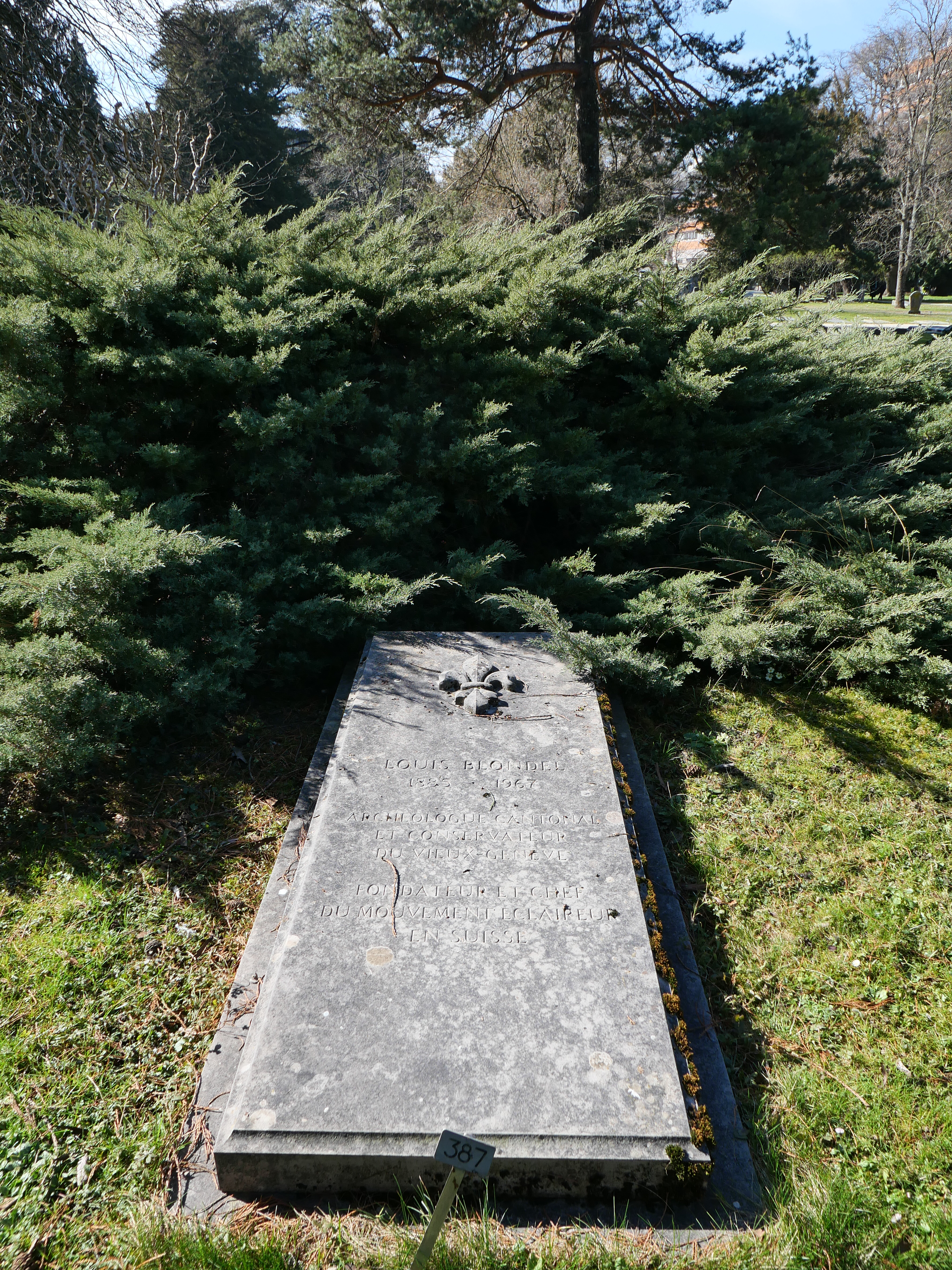
The tomb of Swiss archeologist Louis Blondel (1885-1967) at the cemetery of Kings in Geneva. Blondel was the director of the antiquities service of the canton of Geneva and also the founder of the scouting movement in Switzerland.

Louis Blondel (24 November 1885, in Geneva – 17 January 1967) was a Swiss archaeologist, the first director of the cantonal archaeological service in Geneva, as well as one of the founders of Scouting in Switzerland. He served as Federal Scout Leader in 1934.

Blondel also participated in local politics as administrative adviser of his town, Lancy, for 28 years. He was a member of the Liberal Party (right). During World War I he served as a first lieutenant in Battalion 13 of the Swiss Armed Forces, and he served in the "local guards" in Geneva during World War II. Married to Claire Bonnard in 1920, he had two children.
