= Scouting and Guiding in Switzerland =

Scouting and Guiding in Switzerland is made up of numerous scouting and guiding bodies which act to provide the opportunities to scout. This could be though Swiss national Scouting and Guiding organizations, through independent troops (attached to the German Scout organization) or through international troops established in Switzerland. While the latter two are similar, there is a fundamental difference because the three independent groups while taking guidance under different national regimes it is a program developed by people in the various cities, where the presence of international groups in Switzerland is a top down targeted programs that have been developed to offer expatriates scouting and guiding in the language they are used to (mostly English) and are developed in areas with a larger expatriate community. All of which are supported the existence of the Kandersteg International Scout Centre and Our Chalet, both acting as semi-permanent jamborees.

== National Scouting and Guiding organizations ==
- The main national Scouting organization in Switzerland is the Swiss Guide and Scout Movement, affiliated to World Organization of the Scout Movement and World Association of Girl Guides and Girl Scouts, more than 42,000 members
- Ehemaligen Pfadi Schweiz/Anciens Scouts de Suisse, affiliated to International Scout and Guide Fellowship
- Feuerkreis Niklaus von Flüe, founded 1988, Catholic, affiliated to World Federation of Independent Scouts
- Pfadfinderbund Seeland, interreligious and coeducational, affiliated to World Federation of Independent Scouts
- Schweizerische Pfadfinderschaft Europas/ Guides et Scouts d’Europe Suisse, affiliated to Union Internationale des Guides et Scouts d'Europe
- Royal Rangers/Jungschar Schweiz, affiliated to Royal Rangers
- Adventwacht (ADWA), Adventist and coeducational, affiliated to Pathfinder International
- Hashomer Hatzair Switzerland

== Independent troops ==
- In Basel operates a single Girl Scouts troop of the German traditionalist Catholic Scout association Katholische Pfadfinderschaft Jeanne d'Arc. This troop operates within the Society of St. Pius X.
- Pfadi Weiach in Stadel, Kaiserstuhl and Fisibach. The troop is interreligious, coeducational and is a former unit of the Swiss Guide and Scout Movement
- IG Gewässerschutz Kollbrunn-Flusspfadi Tösstal in Kollbrunn, Sea Scouts, interreligious and coeducational

== International Scout and Guide units in Switzerland ==
- Boy Scouts of America, served by the Transatlantic Council
- Girl Scouts of the USA, served by USAGSO headquarters
- Girlguiding UK, served by British Guides in Foreign Countries
- Hungarian Scouting, served by Külföldi Magyar Cserkészszövetség - Hungarian Scout Association in Exteris
- Det Danske Spejderkorps has also troops in Switzerland.
- Corpo Nacional de Escutas has a group in Geneve.

== International Scout centres ==
Two international Scout centres are located in Switzerland: Kandersteg International Scout Centre, affiliated with WOSM, and Our Chalet, affiliated with WAGGGS.
