= Scouting and Guiding in Bangladesh =

Scouting and Guiding Organizations in Bangladesh

The Scout and Guide movement in Bangladesh is served by Bangladesh Scouts, member of the World Organization of the Scout Movement and Bangladesh Girl Guides Association, member of the World Association of Girl Guides and Girl Scouts.

== International Scouting Units in Bangladesh ==
In addition, there are American Boy Scouts in Dhaka, linked to the Direct Service branch of the Boy Scouts of America, which supports units around the world. Bangladesh Scouts is the national Scouting organization of Bangladesh.Scouting was founded in Bangladesh as part of the British Indian branch of The Scout Association, and continued as part of the Pakistan Boy Scouts Association until the country's divided sections split in 1971 during the Bangladesh Liberation War.
