= Scout Association of Malta =

National Scouting organization in Malta

The Scout Association of Malta (TSAM)
- Headquarters: Island Headquarters, Congreve-Bernard Memorial Hall, E.S. Tonna Square, Floriana, Malta GC (EU)
- Country: Malta
- Founded: 1908
- Membership: 5,000
- Chief Scout: Liana Saliba Gazzano
- Chief Commissioner: Daniel Cassar
- Affiliation: World Organization of the Scout Movement
- Website scouts.mt

Founded in 1908, The Scout Association of Malta (TSAM) is the Scouting organization in Malta. Its leaders and members are committed to further the ideals of Scouting in line with those established by the youth movement's Founder, Lord Robert Baden-Powell of Gilwell, and as further developed by the World Organization of the Scout Movement (WOSM). TSAM is a forward looking youth movement. It is the only association in Malta which is recognised by the WOSM, and is also a member of the European Scout Region.

TSAM's motto in Maltese is "Kun Lest", translating as Be Prepared in English. The official logo and membership badge of TSAM features the Maltese eight-pointed cross and the Scout fleur-de-lys logo motif.

== A Brief History ==
Scouting, also known as the Scout Movement, is a worldwide youth movement with the stated aim of supporting young people in their physical, mental and spiritual development, so that they may play constructive roles in society. Scouting began in 1907 when Lord Robert Baden-Powell of Gilwell, a Lieutenant-General in the British Army, held the first Scouting encampment at Brownsea Island in England.

This brief summary and highlight of events and other notable dates of the Scouts in Malta prior, during and soon after the end of the First World War (WW1), gives a very good insight of other Scout activities during this period. Being part of the British Empire, Malta was one of the first countries where Scouting started.

The close connection the Islands have with the Scout Movement's founder, Lord Robert Baden-Powell started when he served in the rank of Captain as Assistant Military Secretary to his uncle, General Sir Henry Augustus Smyth who then was Governor of Malta, between 1890 and 1893.

Scouting in Malta started in 1908, only one year after its establishment in Great Britain, and the Maltese Scouts were the first Association formed outside of the British Isles, together with Australia, Ireland, New Zealand and South Africa. Maltese scout troops were officially recognised in 1909 and by the end of the year a total of one hundred and forty four Scouts were enrolled in seven different Troops” (Mizzi, 1989, p40). The 1st Sliema Scout Troop applied to be registered by The Boy Scouts Association of the United Kingdom on October 12, 1909, and, a year later in 1910, it was registered as the second overseas troop with The Boy Scouts Association. At this time there were 338 Boy Scouts and 3 Scoutmasters listed as members in Malta.

Chief Scout Baden-Powell returned many times to the island, including during a part of his delayed honeymoon with Lady Olave, in February 1913, and when he inspected six Troops from Baracca, Dockyard, Floriana, Sliema, Tigne and Valletta. Baden-Powell recognised and shook hands with two of the Scouts he had tea with in London, during the Coronation in 1911.

On 15 September 1913, the Malta Boy Scouts Association was formally registered by Imperial Headquarters in London as an Overseas Branch of the Boy Scouts Association. The first known Maltese scout troop which was registered was the ‘Sliema Land Scouts’ in September 1909 (interestingly, the 1st Sliema Scout Group - Bernard's Own - is the oldest surviving active Scout Group outside the UK, and in 2009 they celebrated the 100th Anniversary of scouting in Malta), followed by ‘Barracca Land Scouts’ in December 1911. The Boy Scouts Association formed a local association in Malta on 15 September 1913 which became The Boy Scouts Association Malta Branch.

War was declared in August 1914. The First World War had a significant impact on Scouting on Malta, since most of the Scoutmasters were also British and Maltese Servicemen, and who were ordered to the front in Europe. Within weeks of the declaration of hostilities, these Scouts from Malta were on their way to the Western Front. As camps were cancelled, the Scouts volunteered for war service as interpreters, in hospitals, in convalescent centres and in tea rooms, in the censor's office and as coast watchers and messengers.

By November 1915, there were 84 scouts on war duty, 44 of whom had qualified for a special war badge. However, as the latter half of the war progressed, membership rose sharply, and the association's general meeting on 30 November 1917, reported 1,200 members with 28 Scout Troops on the Island.

The first troop registered in Gozo was the 'Gozo Secondary School’ in November 1916.

On Sunday October 14, 1917 a rally for all scouts was held at Mosta. On parade were two District Scoutmasters, 20 Scoutmasters, 33 Assistant Scoutmasters, 115 Patrol Leaders and 625 Scouts. The Chief Scout, Lord Methuen presented warrants to the first Island Commissioner of the Malta Boy Scouts Association, Mr. E. Bonavia.

An incident which occurred, and which shed some dark light on the Boy Scouts, was when some allegations were made that Boy Scouts and Girl Guides Movements had an alliance with the Evangelical Alliance, whereas their members were Roman Catholics. Thus, in August 1925, a group of Scouts from the United Kingdom were going to Rome to meet with the Pope, including a party of thirty-four Maltese Scouts. In his book "Scouting in Malta: an Illustrated history" (1989), John A. Mizzi states that Baden-Powell told the Scouts: By your behaviour and good conduct, show to the heads of your Church in Rome that as Scouts you have not two masters but that your only Master is God and your Church. Your Scout masters are merely your elder brothers, showing you how better to do your duty as good Catholics. I want you to remember that and to obey the discipline of your Church. (Mizzi, 1989, p115).

Mizzi (1989) also states that on his last visit to Malta, Baden-Powell said: I see a great change for the better in these boys as compared with the boys of the old days, now, as Scouts, they have interests, hobbies and aims in life and I would like your Scouters to realise that the time and energy which they put into Scouting is not thrown away; they are doing a big national service in giving their boys health of body, mind and spirit. They are thereby giving appreciable help respectively to the Church and Education. (Mizzi, 1989, p179).

Shortly before his death in 1940, Baden-Powell wrote in a final letter to the Islands' Scouts: to congratulate my old friends, the Maltese on the plucky way they have stood up to the infernal bombing of the Italians ... They have the spirit of fearlessness and patience which enables them to face danger with a smile to stick it out to the triumphant finish ...

The Second World War saw similar service from the Maltese Scouts, as they supported the Allied forces throughout the aerial siege of 1940 to 1943. This resulted in The Boy Scouts Association's branch and its members receiving a collective award of the Bronze Cross, "in recognition of their courage and devotion to duty in the face of continuous enemy action in the war for freedom".

The Maltese Boy Scouts Association was then formed in October 1966, right after Malta became an independent nation earlier in 1964. In October 1966, an extraordinary general meeting of The Boy Scouts Association Malta Branch dissolved the branch and the Malta Boy Scouts Association was formed independent from The Scout Association of the United Kingdom. The association became a member of the Boy Scouts International Conference in December 1966. The vice-president of the International Conference, Lady Olave Baden-Powell, presented the registration certificate to the Chief Scout of Malta. In the years which followed, the association changed its name to The Scout Association of Malta (TSAM).

In 1966, the association became an independent body and a full member of the World Organization of the Scout Movement (WOSM). In 1976 the name of the association was re-styled as "The Malta Scouts Association", and by a further amendment of its Policy, Organisation and Rules (P.O.R.) of 31 October 1978, in order to comply with the provisions of Act XXII of 1978 of the Laws of Malta, the name of the association was established as "THE SCOUT ASSOCIATION".

In 2007, TSAM inaugurated the Beaver section in its training programmes.

Since its foundation, Scouting has been one of the "most active and strongest youth organization on the Island" ("Brief History," 2012).

== Origins of Scouting in Gozo ==
Introduction: The Scout Movement in Gozo owes its beginning to Mr Carmelo Joseph Flores, a Maltese teacher at the Secondary School in Gozo. The first Scout Troop, known as The Gozo Secondary School Troop (No. 16), was established on 1 November 1916 and it was registered on 24 November 1916. The Troop, with Mr Flores as Scoutmaster, was recognised officially by the Scout Association of Malta on 26 December 1916. On the day of registration, the Troop consisted of 19 Scouts, but a year later, the number had increased to about 27. One of the first problems which the Troop had to face, was that of having a place where to hold its meetings. Through the intervention of W.C. Millard, Gozo Secretary for the Government, the Scouts were allocated a Government property at Triq Żenqa in the Citadel. Since 1890, this building had housed the archives of the Gozo Law Courts but it was then refurbished so that it could be used by the Scouts.

This early experience of Scouting in Gozo is followed by a period during which there is no evidence of any form of Scouting activity on the island. The movement became popular again in the 1930s, when several Boy Scout Groups cropped up in Gozo namely Victoria, Lyceum, Għarb, Għasri, Żebbuġ, Xagħra, Xewkija, Għajnsielem and Nadur. A census on the number of Scouts in Malta, held in 1938, shows that in Gozo there were 359 Scouts in all: Għajnsielem 38, Għarb 37, Għasri 31, Lyceum 27, Nadur 68, Victoria 47, Xewkija 25, Xagħra 21 and Żebbuġ 15. At the time the Scouts used to meet in a building close to the chapel known as San Ġakbu in Main Square, nowadays known as Independence Square. When, World War II broke out, membership dwindled. However, during the war, the Victoria Scouts played a part in the ‘war effort’. The Scouts were used as messengers to give air raid alarms between police stations and churches.

When the war ended, the few members that had survived the war used to meet in Casa Bondì in the Citadel. In 1948, the Victoria Scout Group was amalgamated with the Salesian Scout Group of the Don Bosco Oratory. However, due to the numerous activities organised at the Oratory, the interest in the Scout Group waned gradually and this was dissolved in 1964. During the 1950s, the Lyceum Scout Troop was formed again. However its existence was short-lived. During the same period, other Troops were formed at Sannat, the Victoria Primary School, Għajnsielem, Nadur and the Xagħra Catholic Action Movement. These too functioned for only a short while.

The Victoria Scout Group: The Victoria Scout Group, as it is known today, was officially inaugurated on 13 July 1963. The first Group Scout Leader (GSL) was Mr. Joseph G. Grech, known as ‘Skip’ and the chaplain of the group was Fr Albert Curmi.

The Group used to meet in a house in Għajn Qatet Street, owned by the Group Scout Leader's mother, Mrs Ġorġa Grech, who offered her house free of charge to be used ‘temporarily’ as the Group's headquarters. The headquarters were opened by the District Commissioner, Mr Anton Vassallo and were blessed by H.L. Mons. Giuseppe Pace, Bishop of Gozo. Led by Mr Joe Grech, the Group continued to grow from strength to strength. In 1963, it started to publish its own newssheet. Its members took part in the fund-raising activity known as ‘bob-ajob’ week. The group had its own Scout band. It organised hikes and held two camps annually, in summer and during the Easter holidays. Its members took part in expeditions both locally and abroad. It performed good deeds. It helped out whenever it was asked to. Most important of all, it gave its members an education for life, according to the Scouting Method. The first GSL of the Group, Mr Joe Grech remained at the helm for 27 years. Towards the end of 1990, Mr Grech was chosen by the Scout Association of Malta to take up the post of Chief Commissioner of the association. This meant a new GSL was needed. The person chosen was Mr Lorrie Saliba who still occupies this post. In July 1989, the dream of the group of having its own premises came true when, after several years of hard work by council members, supporters, former Scouts and friends of the Group, a new Scout headquarters was inaugurated in Santa Dminka Street, Victoria. The Group had occupied the house lent by Mrs Ġorġa Grech for 27 years. Unfortunately, this great benefactor of the group was not there to see the realisation of this dream because she had died in March 1989. The Group is forever indebted to her. Were it not for her gesture way back in 1963, to provide the group with a premises it could call its headquarters, the story of the Group might have been quite different. The story of the headquarters did not end here. Another inauguration ceremony, this time of an extension to the headquarters was held in March 2001. The original headquarters had become too small to accommodate the ever increasing number of members so the Group had to undertake yet another major project to improve its facilities.

Both headquarters had their share of distinguished visitors. In February 1964, the Chief Scout of the Commonwealth Sir Charles McLean paid a visit. On 7 November 1998, on the occasion of the 90th anniversary of the arrival of Scouting in Malta, it was the turn of Dr Charles Moreillon, Secretary General of the World Organisation of the Scout Movement. Along the years, various presidents of Malta visited the headquarters. There were also visits by prime ministers, ministers and parliamentary secretaries, MEPs, bishops, officials of the Scout Association of Malta, various Scout groups from Malta and Scouts from all around the world. The headquarters also hosts foreign Scout Groups who are visiting Gozo.

The Group was also present during certain historical events, such as the consecration of Bishop N. Cauchi in 1967 and that of Bishop M. Grech in 2005 and the visit to Gozo by Pope John Paul II in May 1990. In 1967 and 1992, it took part in the activities held on the occasion of the visits to Gozo by Her Majesty Queen Elizabeth II. The present Group is still doing its best to continue the tradition of Scouting and offer a quality as well as fun experience to its members. While the training programme has evolved along the years to meet the needs and realities of today's children and youths, the core values of Scouting have not changed. The Scout Law and Scout Promise are still the same and bind members to do their duty to God and country and to be of service to others. The principle of learning by doing, working in a team, caring for the environment, the support provided by adults and the importance of youth involvement from the planning stage to the actual carrying out of the activities undertaken by the Group are still of the utmost importance. The Group's members attend the weekly meetings at headquarters as well as other outdoor activities and Group and sectional camps. Members of the Group participate in national activities such as national camps, the annual rally for all the Scout and Girl Guide Groups in Malta and Gozo, Scout Forums and joint activities between both Maltese or foreign Scout groups. They take part in expeditions around the Maltese Islands and abroad. They participate in youth exchange projects funded by the EU. The group still issues its Newssheet on a quarterly basis. Scouts carry out clean-ups or tree planting sessions in different localities. Leaders of the Group attend training courses at Island Headquarters in Malta before they are registered as qualified leaders. The Victoria Scout Group puts a special emphasis on the importance of being of service to others. Each year it organises different fund raising activities for the benefit of other philanthropic organisations, both local as well as international ones. These include car washes, walks for charity, bicycle hikes, lunches, barbeques, blood donating sessions, providing support in activities organised by the local councils and visits to the elderly. In this way it instills in its members the importance of thinking of others before one's self, which words are an integral part of the Scout Law and Promise.

The Gozitan Scouts have participated in almost all the World Scout Jamborees held from 1920 onwards. Jamborees are international camps held once every four years in different countries where Scouts from all over the world come together for around ten days. The last Jamboree was held in Japan in July and August 2015 and the participants amounted to around 33,600. The next Jamboree will be held in the US in 2019 and the Victoria Scout Group will be represented by 18 members. In 2013, the Group celebrated its 50th anniversary by publishing a book which narrates its history. The author of this book is former Venture Scout Leader, Mr Carmel C.Cachia. In 2016, the Group celebrated the 100th anniversary of Scouting in Gozo. A parade was held around the streets of Victoria. The majority of the Maltese Scout groups and several Scout bands took part in this rally.

Presently, Gozo has 2 Scout Groups, the Victoria Scout Group and the Xagħra Scout Group. The latter Group was one of the first Scout Groups to be set up in Gozo and was one of the most active groups in the 1930s. In 1952 another attempt at reviving the group was made. In the 1970s, on the initiative of Vincent Vella, a leader with the Żejtun Group, the Xagħra Scout Group was revived. The same Scout Leader was instrumental in reopening the Xagħra Scout Group in May 2008. This Scout Group recently celebrated its 10th anniversary. Presently the Victoria Scout Group boasts of around 130 members, divided into four sections: Cubs, Scouts, Venture Scouts and Rover Scouts. This number also includes the members of the Group Council. The number of members in the Xagħra Scout Group amount to 111. This also includes members of their Group Council. The Xagħra Group is divided into four sections: the Beaver Colony, the Pack Section, the Scout Troop and the Venture Unit. The first GSL was Mr Vincent Vella who occupied the post from 2008 to 2012. In June 2012, Ms Loraine Borg became the 2nd GSL for the Xagħra Group. The present Group Scout Leader is Mr Josmar Azzopardi and he has occupied the post since October 2017. The Xagħra Scout Group can also boast of owning its own headquarters which was inaugurated in May 2016. During the year, the two Scout Groups organise several joint activities. Throughout the years, the Victoria Scout Group has received several recognitions for the services rendered to the Gozitan community. The Venture Unit was placed 2nd amongst 18 submissions in the Għarfien Nazzjonali Żgħażagħ fis-Soċjetà 2003. In 2007 the Group was awarded Ġieħ Għawdex by the Circolo Gozitano. In 2010, it was awarded Ġieħ il-Belt Vittoria by the local Council of Victoria. In 2010, it was chosen as the President's Group in recognition for its efforts to raise a considerable amount of money (€4606) for the Strina campaign in aid of the Community Chest Fund.

== Organisation ==
TSAM has at present four (4) Scouting districts: the main island of Malta has three of the Districts, with the fourth being the neighbouring island of Gozo (which currently has two groups, that of the towns of Victoria and of Xaghra .

Each TSAM scout group belongs to a particular district depending on its location. Around forty (40) Scout Groups are registered and active with TSAM which boasts a membership in the region of 3,000 youths and approximately 500 adult leaders, makingTSAM the largest voluntary organisation of the Maltese Islands.

There is a Chief Scout and an Island Headquarters of around 15 leaders and administrators.

The mission of Scouting is to contribute to the education of young people, through a values-oriented system based on the Scout Promise and Law, to help build a better world where people are self-fulfilled as individuals and play a constructive role in society. This is achieved by:

• involving them throughout their formative years in a non-formal educational process

• using a specific method that makes each individual the principal agent of his or her development as a self-reliant, supportive, responsible and committed person

• assisting them to establish a values system based upon spiritual, social and personal principles as expressed in the Promise and Law

Scouting is about preparing for life. The motto "Be Prepared" has many applications especially when it comes to childhood development and its final scope is to aid in the development of active and responsible citizens thus contributing to the creation of a better world.

TSAM promotes the social, physical, intellectual, characterial, emotional and spiritual formation of its young adult members through a policy of inclusivity. TSAM offers its youth programme in five sections in accordance to the different age groups: Beavers (5 to 7), Cub Scouts (7 to 11), Scouts (11 to 14 1/2), Venture Scouts (14 1/2 to 18 ), Rover Scouts (18 to 26 ) and Leaders (18 to 65) which are divided into Scout Groups according to their locality.

In Scouting, children experience competitive and non-competitive activities that include physical and problem-solving activities, outdoor activities (such as water-sports, cooking, hiking, walking, aerial challenges and much more). Each Scout Group and Section within our Groups organize weekly outdoor activities ranging from community work to hikes, camping and life skills, which activities are all of a non-formal educational nature.

At national level, TSAM, through its departments, handles all the leaders' training, updating of all youth section's programmes, organizes national events, manages administrative details and takes care of its national assets such as the Ghajn Tuffieha International Scout Campsite.

TSAM is also active internationally and apart from participating at World Scout Jamborees and similar gatherings, it has also been in a position to contribute to Scouting at a European Level with members from the National Team actively assisting at such fora.

== Sections ==
youth members follow programmes in the following age sections:

- Beaver scouts - 5-7
- Cub scouts - 7-11
- Scouts - 10.5-14.5
- Venture scouts - 14.5-18
- Rover scouts - 18-26

== See also ==
- The Malta Girl Guides Association
