= Lawrie Dring =

British scouting leader

Lawrence Dring
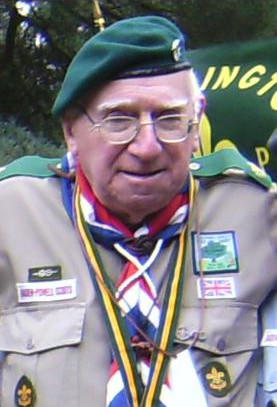
- Born: 4 July 1931; Dundee, Scotland
- Died: 6 September 2012 (aged 81)
- Other names: Bob, Dringo, El Presidente
- Occupation: chemical engineering
- Known for: Founder of Baden-Powell Scouts' Association and World Federation of Independent Scouts

Lawrence 'Lawrie' Dring (4 July 1931 – 6 September 2012) was a British Scouter who was one of the founding members of the Baden-Powell Scouts' Association (BPSA) and of the World Federation of Independent Scouts (WFIS). He was President of the BPSA at the time of his death.

Dring was born on Dundee railway station, one of twin boys. At the time of his birth his mother was attempting to return to Leeds to ensure that the boys were born Yorkshiremen. Although born in Scotland, with a Scottish father and proud to call himself a Scot, his birth was registered in Leeds. His brother was killed as an adult in a car accident.

After leaving school, Dring worked for Fisons Chemicals, until joining Allied Colloids in 1973. He also ran his own company, Dring Associates, which dealt with the disposal of hazardous waste.

In 1947, Dring was a soldier in the British Army stationed in Wuppertal, Germany when a colleague asked him to become a Cub Scout leader. After returning from his national service he joined the Leeds District of The Boy Scout Association, serving on the executive until the adoption of The Chief Scouts' Advance Party Report. Disagreeing with the direction of the association, he resigned and helped form the Baden-Powell Scouts' Association and the World Federation of Independent Scouts.

In addition to serving a term as chief commissioner of the B-PSA, and later as president, he continued to volunteer as a Scouter for 1st Yorkshire Baden-Powell Scouts Troop. He visited Canada, the United States, Germany, South Africa and Australia.

Dring's funeral took place on 21 September 2012 at the Holy Trinity Church at Rothwell. His coffin was met by an honour guard of Scouts and leaders from several Scout associations and was carried by Scouts from First Yorkshire B-P Scout Group. The service was conducted by the Reverend Jeremy Trigg, who had been one of Dring's Wolf Cubs. The committal took place at Stanley Cemetery.
