= National Pool Lifeguard Qualification =

Standard qualification program

The RLSS UK National Pool Lifeguard Qualification (NPLQ) is the standard qualification providing training to over 95% of lifeguards in the United Kingdom and Ireland. The NPLQ can also be delivered in other countries where trainers and training centres meet RLSS UK standards. The RLSS UK NPLQ qualifications and courses are administered by IQL UK Ltd, part of the Royal Life Saving Society charity.

Courses can be delivered over a one-week intensive course or over a number of different sessions. The RLSS UK NPLQ course contains both theory and practical training (reflected in the assessment ). Practical training includes CPR, Intervention and Rescue, Rescue of a casualty with a Suspected Spinal Injury and First Aid. Classroom based theory topics include those in the practical sessions as well as many topics relating to the role and requirements of the modern day lifeguard. The RLSS UK NPLQ qualification is internationally recognised and can be especially useful for students wishing to travel abroad to continue lifeguarding.

In Ireland the majority of awards are done through IQL Ireland (Institute of Qualified Lifeguards Ireland).

== Course structure ==
To obtain the qualification, two units must be passed. Unit one consist of training in swimming pool supervision, the principles of lifesaving and basic first aid. For new candidates, a minimum of thirty one hours of training must have been undertaken. Unit one is assessed by an external trainer assessor.

Unit two assesses the practical application of the techniques learnt in unit one, with a minimum of seven hours of work being required to pass. It is assessed on an ongoing basis by a qualified trainer assessor.

To obtain the qualification, both units must be passed within six months of each other. The qualification lasts for 2 years from the date of issue and a further 20 hours of training must be completed before a lifeguard applies for renewal.

In 2018 the latest version of the RLSS UK NPLQ was launched called 'Generation 9'. It is endorsed by CIMSPA and is currently the UK's only professional standard qualification for lifeguards.

The previous update to the RLSS UK NPLQ was in 2012, which led to an unprecedented reduction in drownings in lifeguarded swimming pools in the UK to zero. This update, referred to as the 8th edition, was introduced that combined unit 1 & 2 into a single unit. Revision 8 also incorporated changes that rationalized the structure, some subjects were added, some removed or amended. The training material was completely revised together with the training material. An optional AED add-on is now available in revision 8. All trainer/assessors need to attend an update in order to train or assess RLSS UK NPLQ going forward as revision 7 was withdrawn in 2013.
