= Mannosylglucosyl-3-phosphoglycerate synthase =

Class of enzymes

Identifiers
- EC no.: 2.4.1.270

Databases
- IntEnz: IntEnz view
- BRENDA: BRENDA entry
- ExPASy: NiceZyme view
- KEGG: KEGG entry
- MetaCyc: metabolic pathway
- PRIAM: profile
- PDB structures: RCSB PDB PDBe PDBsum
Search
- PMC: articles
- PubMed: articles
- NCBI: proteins

Mannosylglucosyl-3-phosphoglycerate synthase (EC 2.4.1.270, MggA) is an enzyme with systematic name GDP-mannose:2-O-(alpha-D-glucosyl)-3-phospho-D-glycerate 2-O-alpha-D-mannosyltransferase. It catalyses the following chemical reaction:

2-O-(α-D-glucopyranosyl)-3-O-phospho-D-glyceric acid
+ GDP-mannose
GDP
(1)

mannosylglucosylglycerate

A mannose sugar group is transferred from GDP-mannose to one of the hydroxy groups of the glucose unit of the starting material. This gives 2-O-[α-D-mannopyranosyl-(1→2)-α-D-glucopyranosyl]-3-O-phospho-D-glyceric acid (1), with guanosine diphosphate as a byproduct. The enzyme was characterised from the thermophilic bacterium, Petrotoga mobilis, where it forms the penultimate step in the biosynthesis of mannosylglucosylglycerate, a compound which protects the organism from osmotic shock.
