= Malta Girl Guides Association =

Malta Girl Guides
- Headquarters: Capuchins Street, Floriana
- Country: Malta
- Founded: 1918
- Membership: 1,337
- President: Carmen Elina Camilleri
- Chief Commissioner: Rachel Aquilina
- Affiliation: World Association of Girl Guides and Girl Scouts
- Website maltagirlguides.com

The Malta Girl Guides Association (MGGA) is the national Guiding association of Malta. Guiding in Malta started in 1918 and the association became a member of the World Association of Girl Guides and Girl Scouts (WAGGGS) in 1966. The girls-only association has 1,337 members (as of 2003).

== History ==
Guiding in Malta began in 1918 for British girls as part of The Guide Association (UK). In 1923, Maltese girls formed a separate organization. Both organizations merged in 1938, although there remained some groups of British Guides.

In 1966, two years after the independence of Malta, the MGGA became an associate member of the WAGGGS. The association gained full WAGGGS-membership in 1972, and the last groups of British Guides left the island in 1978.

== Programme ==
The aim of the association is to "enable young girls and young women to develop good character formation and to discover their potential through an interactive programme giving a positive sense of direction and a world of opportunities as responsible citizens".

The association is divided in four age-groups:

- Dolphins (ages 4 to 7)
- Brownies (ages 7 to 10)
- Guides (ages 10 to 14)
- Rangers (ages 14 to 16)
- Senior Rangers (ages 16 to 23)

The programme is divided into eight areas:

- Environment
- Skills
- Culture and Heritage
- Health
- Creativity
- Local & International Guiding
- Service
- Mind & Spirit

== See also ==
- The Scout Association of Malta
