= American Scouting overseas =

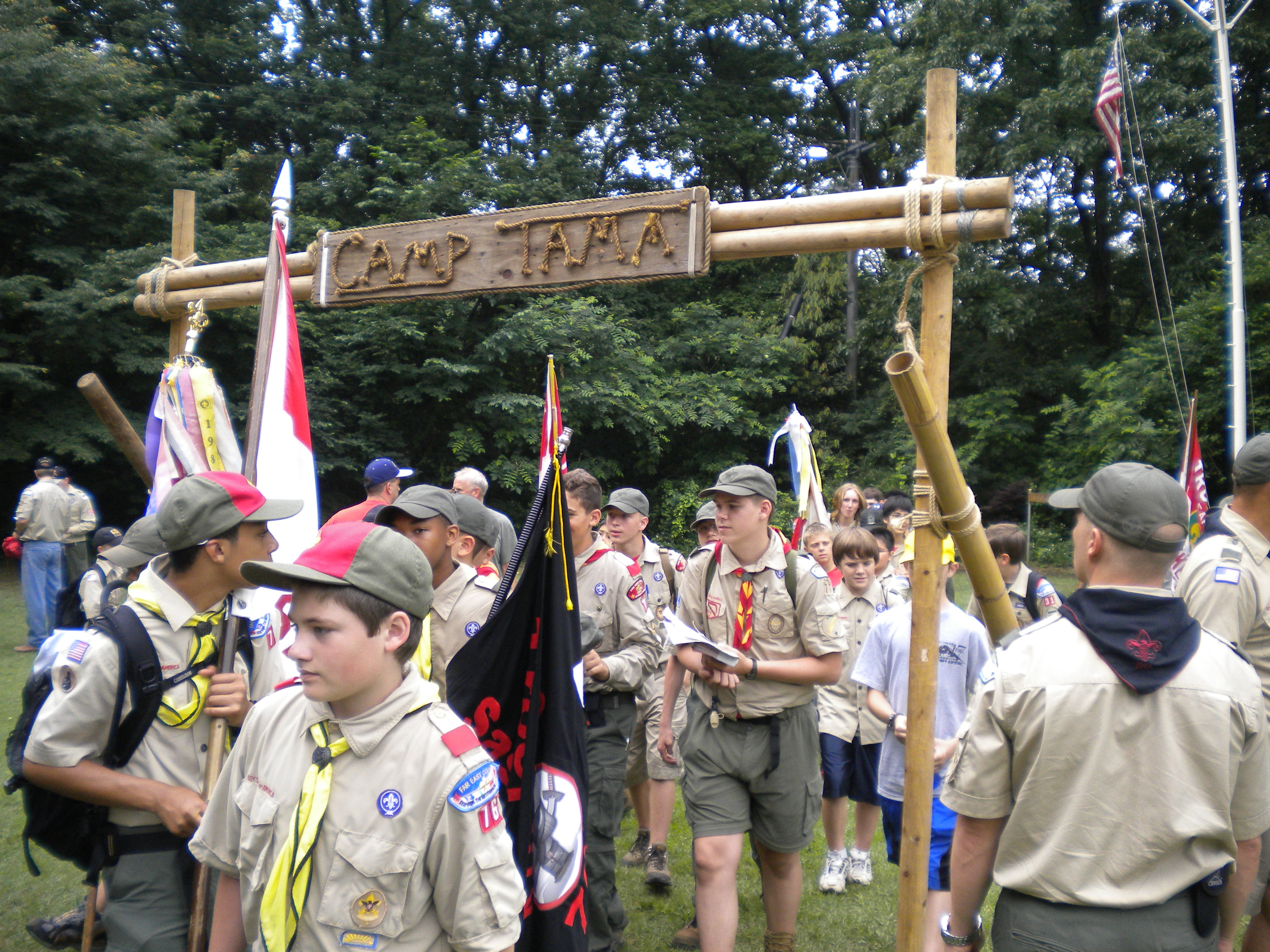
- Boy Scouts at Camp Tama, Japan

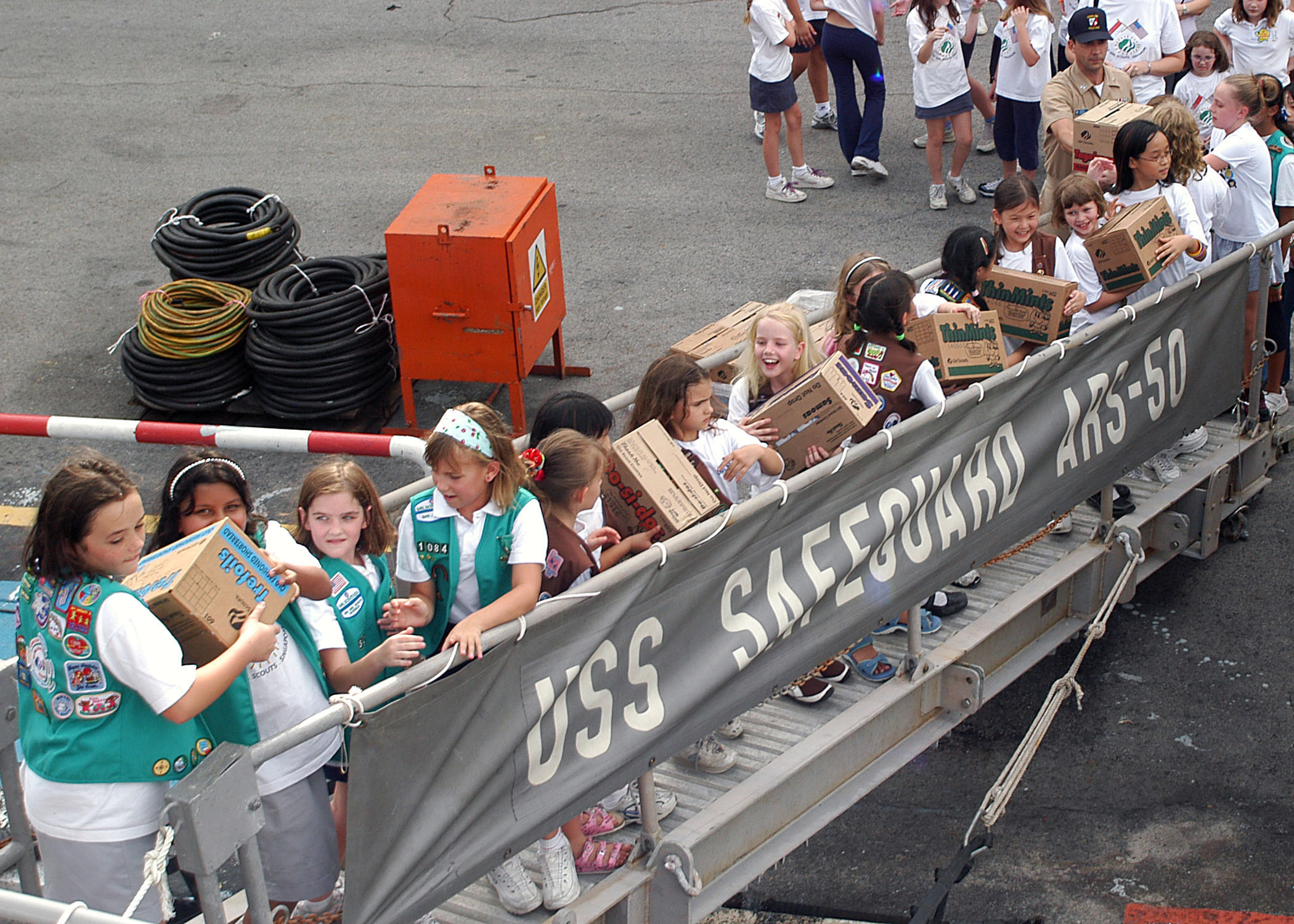
- Girl Scouts and Brownies from two troops in Singapore pass Girl Scout cookie boxes up the brow of the rescue and salvage ship USS Safeguard (ARS 50) as part of Operation Thin Mint.

There have been American Scouts overseas since almost the inception of the movement, often for similar reasons as the present day. Within the Scouting America formerly the Boy Scouts of America (BSA), these expatriate Scouts are now served by two overseas local Councils. Within the Girl Scouts of the USA, the USAGSO serves such a purpose.

== Scouting America (formerly the Boy Scouts of America) ==
=== Direct Service ===
The Direct Service was a program service of the Scouting America/Boy Scouts of America's International Division, created in 1955 to make the Scouting program available to citizens of the United States and their dependents living in countries outside the jurisdiction of the Transatlantic Council (headquartered in Brussels, Belgium and serving American Scouts in Europe, Africa, the Middle East and parts of Asia), the Aloha Council (serving youth residing in much of the eastern and Central Pacific as well as Guam, American Samoa, and several Hawaiian islands) and the Far East Council (headquartered in Japan, serving several nations in Asia and the western Pacific).

The National Capital Area Council provides service and assistance to chartered units and individuals in North and South America.

Direct Service, as a BSA local Council, no longer exists. In 2015, units and individuals registered in Direct Service Council units were transferred to Transatlantic, Far East, or National Capital Area Council, depending on where they live or work. The International Division of the National Council continued supporting the transition until 2018. Records have been closed out and transferred to those three local Councils now.

==== History ====
According to BSA records and Reports to Congress, BSA overseas councils were referred to as "Extra Regional"—being outside the BSA's then-twelve Scouting regions in the states, which were consolidated in 1973 to six and again to the current four in 1993. Overseas councils were organized in the Panama Canal Zone (1923), Beijing, China (1923), Philippines (1924), and Guam (1947). The "Direct Service Council" was formed in 1956, as a result of conversations within the BSA's national office in New Jersey. Several Scouting associations, on behalf of their American citizens living in those countries, wanted to have American Scouts and Scouters to serve as part of their associations while overseas. In fact, the high commissioners in Japan, Europe, and Panama invited BSA to send commissioned Scout executives to help create a program for Americans living overseas. International Scouting accords discouraged such memberships except via wartime criteria that allowed for a small number of youth to take part in local programs when no program of their own host nation existed. The BSA's response was to create within the International Division a "local Council equal" which would do many if not all the services which the BSA provides to communities in other areas of the world and within the United States. These services include membership accounting, unit chartering and rechartering, advancement reporting and filing, insignia and badge issuance, certification of awards and advice on where to conduct Scouting-related activities (mostly camping or ways that the BSA's requirements to "visit community agencies", for instance, could be met while in Zaire or the Isle of Man or in Peru). Direct Service Council did not include Transatlantic, Far East, Aloha, or Canal Zone Councils which had BSA charters to operate as councils since the early 1950s.

The Direct Service Council was headed initially by James R. Sands, the Associate National Director of the BSA's International Division and assisted by two staffers and two technicians. Key national staff officers working within the BSA's National Office wore "extra hats" as Direct Service Council "staffers"; while key volunteers served as members of the executive board of the Council and key BSA youth members were initially made leaders of that Council's youth programs until the council could get on its feet. After 1974, the Council elected its own Council officers (by mail), and an election was held to elect youth representatives for their Order of the Arrow Lodge and their Explorer Presidents Association chapter. In 1989, the practice was discontinued, and appointments were made directly through postal mail from the national office.

In areas whereby significant numbers of American citizens lived, "District" organizations existed. These areas included Hong Kong, Guatemala and Central America, Saudi Arabia and Kuwait, Kenya and the countries surrounding Lake Victoria, Mexico and the Caribbean, and Canada. Each "District" had a volunteer structure, including District Chairs and members and Commissioners to assist existing and new units. Some "Districts" even raised the funding necessary to "borrow" an executive with a multinational firm to serve as their District's professional representative; in other cases, firms like Saudi Aramco "donated" an executive to head up Scouting in that part of the world. Those individuals coordinated directly with the BSA's International offices and, in the 70s and 80s, had the resources to quickly get materials, training aids, awards and insignia, and uniforms to youth and adult members within their areas.

While the BSA officially had no "Districts" within the Direct Service Council, they did respond positively to the effort by creating unique versions of the traditional Direct Service Council insignia to be worn by youth residing in those parts of the council's "territory" without calling them "Districts." Before the Direct Service Council folded, there were ten official "Council Shoulder Patches" or CSPs in addition to the default CSP. In many areas of the council, individual units and parents of Lone Scouts created their own unofficial CSP emblem to wear, with flags and symbology of the local area on those patches instead of the standard emblem. A 12th such emblem was created when Canal Zone merged with Direct Service later.

In 1973, the Direct Service Council newsletter was created, to further provide information to DSC Scouts and Scouters and those serving on its Council "staff" and "leadership". Much of the information was copied from other BSA publications, including specific details on registration, how to participate in BSA national and international activities/events, and new forms placed as inserts. In 1975, the first instances of the word "District" were printed in the newsletter, further acknowledging the growth of this "notional local Council."

The "expansion" and "contraction" of the Direct Service Council depended heavily on the numbers of Americans living in those countries not served by active BSA Councils overseas. This explains why in some years individuals or specific countries in Europe, North Africa, and the Near and Far East were alternately parts of Aloha Council (serving many Pacific island nations), or Transatlantic Council (serving much of Europe, Northern Africa and the Near East) or the Far East Council (serving the far end of the Pacific rim) one year, and the next year part of Direct Service Council. Council territories expanded and contracted, which made it essential that the small International Division staff stay in constant touch with the overseas local Councils and their professional staff.

With Jim Sands, the BSA's biggest defender and supporter of International Scouting, retiring in 1986, Margerite ("Marge") Weilexbaum was appointed as the council's Administrator. This was the first time Scouting America/BSA employed a female as the senior administrator (Council Scout Executive) over any local Council. She provided administrative services normally performed by a commissioned professional scouter and attempted to hold things together until her retirement in 1995.

In 1987, the former Panama Canal (Zone) Council was consolidated and made a part of the Direct Service Council, in a similar way that other Councils were consolidated or merged to form larger local Councils in different areas of the world. An "official" 12th CSP issued by the former Council for its youth to wear featured the words "Direct Service" in addition to the words "Canal Zone." While not officially created by the BSA, the patch was worn by DSC youth and adults living in the Zone until the middle 90s.

In 1990, a national office shakeup and reorganization slimmed down the International Division, and many of its functions were sheared off to other program divisions within the National office. Many DSC Scouters state that this was the start of the end of their Council.

Five years later, when its longtime Administrator retired, several decisions were made regarding the council.

The first was that it would no longer serve or be listed as a "local Council" but rather, in the traditions of the old Lone Scout Service, would serve as a "service element" within the National office. Scouts and Scouters would continue to receive "direct service" from the staff, but the staffing would be cut almost to the bone — from five to two. It was understood that with the advent of faster communication and coordination between units and individuals in the field and the national offices, the existing staffing support was no longer needed. The newsletter was discontinued.

The second was that all supporting elements that made Direct Service a true gem in the eyes of those members and Scouters in the field would be eliminated. This means that in some locations, the "borrowed executives" used to support "district and multi-unit" activities in the council would no longer be supported. BSA Camp inspections at several camps in the former Council and most Order of the Arrow activities would also cease. The Lodge would continue, and individual units may continue to hold OA elections. The actual Ordeal, Brotherhood, and Vigil Honor ceremonies, however, would be conducted by local Councils in Europe, the Far East, or Pacific or held until the Scout or Scouter could return Stateside to participate. This was further restricted by the Order of the Arrow in 1999.

The biggest impact was that the council could no longer conduct sustaining membership enrollment or "Friends of Scouting" campaigns as a local Council. Units, individuals, and those organizations and corporations supporting American Scouting around the world would instead be asked to donate directly to the National Office with funding no longer "earmarked" for the Direct Service Council, but placed in the general operation funds of the BSA.

In 1998, the word "Council" was finally removed from the Direct Service, and plans to no longer issue or sell the ten existing Council CSPs were made. The Direct Service Council finally no longer exist. Scouting America/BSA continues to this day to provide support and service to youth and adults living and working around the world through its Transatlantic, Far East, and Aloha Councils.

==== Administration ====
Direct Service was administered by the International Division of Scouting America/Boy Scouts of America until 1998. It provided some of the same services that a local council provided: Processing registration and magazine subscriptions, maintaining records, approving advancements, processing supply orders, organizing National and World Jamboree participation, operating/managining Gamenowinink Lodge #555, Order of the Arrow, and providing information and program resources.

==== Membership ====
Approximately 3,000 youth members and 1,000 adult leaders belonged to Direct Service units, or are registered as Lone Scouts in isolated areas of the world. Direct Service members are the children of international businesspeople, American expat community, diplomatic corps officials, and U.S. military personnel. Direct Service at its height served 100 Cub Scout Packs, Scouts BSA Troops, Venturing Crews, and Sea Scout Ships in 47 countries on five continents.

==== Program ====
The meetings and activities of Direct Service units were basically the same as those in the United States. Minor modifications are sometimes necessary because of circumstances when living in another country. These modifications often lead to cooperative efforts between the BSA members and Scouts of other associations who attend joint Scouting activities such as jamborees, rallies, community projects, and other events. Local groups of units (formerly districts under the former Direct Service Council) maintained their own camps.

==== Chartered organizations ====
The chartered organizations of Direct Service units included American schools and churches, international schools, U.S. embassies, multinational corporations, parents' groups, veteran organizations and groups, and fraternal organizations.

==== Order of the Arrow ====
Gamenowinink Lodge, the former Direct Service Council's local Order of the Arrow (OA) organization, was first chartered in 1962 and closed with 135 Arrowmen as of 1998. Those Arrowmen became members of other OA lodges The lodge totem is a globe, and the name translates to "On the Other Side of the Great Sea" in the Lenni Lenape language used by the Order of the Arrow. Gamenowinink Lodge was under the supervision and administration of the BSA International Division in Irving, Texas. In 1971 Gamenowinink Lodge absorbed Cuauhtli Lodge #446, which was sponsored by the American Society of Mexico, which served American Scouts in Mexico, and in 1987 absorbed Chiriqui Lodge #391 of the Panama Canal Council, which served American Scouts in the former Panama Canal Zone.

===== Overseas Arrowman =====
Several alumni groups exist to support American Scout Councils and the Order of the Arrow overseas. Foremost among them is the Overseas Arrowman Association (OAA), a private organization incorporated in 1989, and the TAC (Transatlantic Council) Alumni Association.

==== Awards ====
Scouting awards were presented as in any local council, including the Silver Beaver Award and the District Award of Merit. All nominations were reviewed by the BSA's Direct Service committee.

==== Financial support ====
When it was active, Direct Service units organized their own activities to earn money for special programs, equipment, and service projects.

==== Communications ====
The International Division and its Direct Service units communicated via mail, fax, e-mail, and telephone. Unit leaders receive periodic bulletins containing particular information.

==== Canada ====
One of the last BSA Direct Service units, Troop 511, was established in 2008 and is chartered to the Western Chapter of the American Chamber of Commerce in Canada in Calgary, Alberta. It and all other former Direct Service units in North and South America are currently part of the National Capitol Area Council, headquartered in Bethesda, Maryland.

=== Far East Council ===
Far East Council
- Owner: Boy Scouts of America
- Headquarters: Okinawa
- Country: Japan
- Founded: 1953
- Website fareastcouncil.org

The Far East Council, headquartered in Okinawa, Japan, was created in 1953 to make the Scouting program available to United States citizens and their dependents living in several nations in the western Pacific.

==== Administration ====
Far East Council is organized similarly to other BSA local Councils and follows the Status of Forces Agreements with their host nations and the U.S. military. Far East Council is a part of the Gateway Region, Scouting America (Boy Scouts of America).

==== Organization ====
Far East Council members are the children of international businessmen and women, the American expat community, diplomatic corps officials, and U.S. military personnel. Far East Council has three districts that serve Cub Scout packs, Scouts BSA troops, and Venturing crews in forty countries.

Each district has the following countries and units registered through Far East Council:

- Pacific Rim District
  - Australia
  - Japan
    - Atsugi
    - Camp Zama
    - Kobe
    - Misawa
    - Tokyo
    - Yokota
    - Yokosuka
    - Nagoya
  - Philippines
    - Manila
    - Makati City
    - Tanay, Rizal
    - Angeles City, Pampanga
  - New Zealand
  - Taiwan
    - Taipei
    - Hsinchu
- Guiding Compass District
  - Okinawa
    - Camp Courtney
    - Camp Foster
    - Camp Kinser
    - Futenma
    - Gushikawa
    - Kadena
  - Southern Japan
    - Iwakuni
    - Sasebo
  - Thailand
    - Bangkok
    - Chiangmai
  - Bangladesh
  - Brunei
  - Cambodia
  - India
  - Indonesia
  - Laos
  - Malaysia
  - Nepal
  - Singapore
  - Vietnam
- Phoenix District
  - South Korea (14 units)
    - Camp Humphreys
    - Daegu
    - Osan
    - Pyeongtaek
    - Seoul
  - China, People's Republic (13 units)
    - Beijing
    - Guang Zhou
    - Shanghai
  - Hong Kong (4 units)
  - Mongolia (2 units)

Far East Council American Scouting overseas map.

==== Program ====
The meetings and activities of Far East Council units are the same as those in the United States. Minor modifications are sometimes necessary because of circumstances that occur when living in another country. These modifications often lead to cooperative efforts between the BSA members and Scouts of other associations who attend joint Scouting activities such as jamborees, rallies, community projects, and other events.

==== Camps ====
- Camp Okami, Japan
- Camp Tiger, South Korea
- Camp Dragon, Okinawa, Japan
- Asia Adventure Camp (Also referred to as Trilogy Camp)(which moves between Mongolia, Thailand, and a country selected by FEC board).
  - In July 2026, it will be held in Malaysia.

==== Chartered organizations ====
The chartered organizations of Far East Council units include schools and churches, international schools, U.S. embassies, multinational corporations, parents' groups, veteran organizations, and fraternal organizations.

==== Order of the Arrow ====
The Achpateuny Lodge, initially chartered in 1953 as Hinode Goya Lodge 498 (Rising Sun), serves 441 Arrowmen as of 2021. The lodge totem is a dragon, and the name Achpateuny translates to "East Wind" in the Lenni Lenape language. Officially, Baluga Lodge 538 (founded May 1959 at Clark Air Base in the Philippines, and functioned under the BSA International Division), merged with Hinode Goya. The lodge later changed its name to Ikunuhkatsi (reportedly translated from the Filipino Aeta as "a Gathering of the Nations") in 1975. Ikunuhkatsi was inactive near the end of its charter year in 1983, and in 1985 it was rechartered as Achpateuny Lodge.

==== Awards ====
Trail medals are issued for the hiking and cleaning of several World War II and historic sites, such as Task Force Smith throughout the Council territory. Taiwan has the Silver Moccasin medal for those who backpack across the island West to East (usually) on the historic Neng Gau trail (in the 1960s and 1970s) or the historic Batongguan Trail (a 9-day trek taken by several Scouts in 2008). In 2005, Taiwan District re-cast the historic Golden Carabao medal. Which was awarded in the 1960s and 1970s to adult volunteers for exemplary service.

==== Countries ====
The Far East Council has the most countries than any council. It serves 40 different countries, but only has active scouting units in 20 of them, as of June 2026. The Council is separated into 3 distinct Districts that serve these countries.

Pacific Rim District - Australia, Cook Islands, Fiji, French Polynesia, Guam, Japan (not including Okinawa), Kwajalein, Kiribati, New Caledonia, New Zealand, Papua New Guinea, Philippines, Samoa, Solomon Islands, Taiwan, Tonga, Tuvalu, and Vanuatu.

Guiding Compass District - Bangladesh, Bhutan, Brunei, Cambodia, India, Indonesia, Laos, Malaysia, Maldives, Myanmar, Nepal, Okinawa, Singapore, Sri Lanka, Thailand, Timor-Leste, and Vietnam.

Phoenix District - China, Hong Kong, Macao, Mongolia, and South Korea.

=== Transatlantic Council ===
Transatlantic Council
- Owner: Boy Scouts of America
- Headquarters: Brussels
- Country: Belgium
- Website tac-bsa.org

The Transatlantic Council, or TAC for short, was originally created in November 1950 in Heidelberg, Germany, as the EUCOM Council because it was sponsored by the US Army's European Command (renamed USAREUR United States Army Europe in 1952). The EUCOM Council was redesignated as the Transatlantic Council in 1955. TAC serves to make the Scouting America/BSA program available to United States citizens and their dependents living in Europe, Africa, the Middle and Near East, and Central Asia. The council's boundaries expanded in 2009 when many units that had previously been Direct Service were added to the Transatlantic Council. In landmass, TAC is the largest of the Scouting America/BSA local councils.

==== History ====
After U.S. military families arrived in Europe during the late 1940s, BSA units began to form in U.S. military communities, initially as direct-service units. Seeing the need to provide a regional organizational structure for Scouting in Europe, a group of military officers and youth activity experts formed the EUCOM Scouting Advisory Council in November 1950. The acronym EUCOM stood for the U.S. Army's European Command, headquartered in Heidelberg, Germany. This headquarters was renamed USAREUR (US Army Europe) in 1952, when the joint-service United States European Command (US EUCOM) was created, but the BSA council's name remained the EUCOM Council.

At the request of BSA's national headquarters, the council changed its name in 1955 to the Transatlantic Council so that the name reflected a geographic area instead of a military headquarters. The council underwent a major expansion in 2009 when former Direct Service units in Africa, the Middle East, and Central Asia were placed under the council.

==== Administration ====
Transatlantic Council fell within the Northeast Region, BSA. A national/Territorial reorganization places TAC within Council Service Territory (CST) 12.

==== Organization ====
Transatlantic Council members are the children of international businesspeople, American expat community, diplomatic corps officials, and U.S. military personnel. Transatlantic serves Cub Scout Packs, Scouts BSA Troops, Venturing Crews, Sea Scout Ships, and Lone Cub Scouts and Scouts in more than 50 countries on three continents.

In 2023, the following countries have one or more Scouting units registered through Transatlantic Council:

- Barbarossa District
  - Germany:
    - Bonn
    - Frankfurt
    - Hamburg
    - Kaiserslautern
    - Ramstein
    - Sembach
    - Spangdahlem
    - Wiesbaden
- Charlemagne District
  - Belgium:
    - Brussels
    - SHAPE (Mons)
  - Denmark:
  - Finland:
  - France:
    - Paris
  - Luxembourg:
  - Netherlands:
    - Brunssum
    - The Hague
  - Norway:
  - Sweden:
- Edelweiss District
  - Austria:
    - Vienna
  - Belarus:
  - Czech Republic:
  - Estonia
  - Germany:
    - Ansbach
    - Berlin
    - Grafenwöhr
    - Hohenfels
    - Munich
    - Stuttgart
    - Vilseck
  - Hungary:
  - Latvia:
  - Liechtenstein:
  - Lithuania:
    - Vilnius
  - Moldova:
  - Poland:
  - Romania:
    - Bucharest
  - Russia:
  - Slovakia:
  - Switzerland:
    - Basel
    - Bern
    - Geneva
    - Zürich
  - Ukraine:
- Horizon District
  - Angola:
  - Azerbaijan:
    - Baku
  - Bahrain:
  - Egypt:
    - Cairo
  - Ethiopia:
  - Israel:
  - Jordan:
    - Amman
  - Kazakhstan:
  - Kenya:
    - Nairobi
  - Kuwait:
    - Kuwait City
  - Nigeria:
    - Lagos
  - Qatar:
    - Doha
  - Saudi Arabia:
    - Dhahran
    - Riyadh
    - Thuwal
  - Uganda:
  - United Arab Emirates:
    - Abu Dhabi
    - Dubai
  - Uzbekistan:
    - Tashkent
  - Zimbabwe:
    - Harare
- Mayflower District
  - England:
    - RAF Alconbury
    - Cobham
    - RAF Lakenheath
    - London
    - Menwith Hill Station
    - RAF Mildenhall
    - RAF Thorpe
  - Ireland:
  - Iceland:
  - Scotland:
- Mediterranean District
  - Albania:
  - Croatia:
  - Cyprus:
  - Greece:
  - Italy:
    - Aviano
    - Naples
    - Rome
    - Sigonella
    - Vicenza
  - Portugal:
  - Spain:
    - Madrid
    - Rota
  - Turkey:
    - Ankara

==== Program ====
The meetings and activities of Transatlantic Council units are basically the same as those in the United States. Minor modifications are sometimes necessary because of circumstances that occur when living in another country. These modifications often lead to cooperative efforts between the BSA members and Scouts of other associations who attend joint Scouting activities such as jamborees, rallies, community projects, and other events.

==== Camps ====
- Camp Alpine - Kandersteg, Switzerland
- Camp Avantura - Savudrija, Croatia
- Camp Freedom - Oberdachstetten, Germany
- Camp Africa - Nairobi, Kenya

==== Chartered Organizations ====
The chartered organizations of Transatlantic Council units include American military communities, schools and churches, international schools, U.S. embassies, multinational corporations, parents' groups, veterans' groups, and fraternal organizations.

==== Order of the Arrow ====
The Black Eagle Lodge, chartered in 1952 as Bald Eagle Lodge, serves 615 Arrowmen as of 2004. Another Bald Eagle Lodge had been previously chartered and the lodge changed the name to Black Eagle Lodge. The lodge totem is a black eagle, a stylized version of the traditional heraldic black eagle emblem of Germany. Its history of neckerchiefs and patches is at Matt Kirkland's Black Eagle Lodge 482 Patch Museum. A history of documents, newsletters and programs can be found at Black Eagle Lodge 482.

==== Awards ====
Trail medals and emblems are issued for the hiking and cleanup of several cities and historic paths within several areas of the council.

== Girl Scouts of the USA ==
USA Girl Scouts Overseas
- Owner: Girl Scouts of the USA]
- Headquarters: New York
- Country: United States
- Website; Official website

Girl Scouts of the USA are serviced by way of USA Girl Scouts Overseas (USAGSO) headquartered in New York. USAGO has four offices:

- USA Girl Scouts Overseas—North Atlantic serves units in Europe
- USA Girl Scouts Overseas—West Pacific serves units in Japan, Okinawa and Korea
- USA Girl Scouts Overseas—U.S. Virgin Islands serves the Virgin Islands
- Guam Girl Scouts Council serves the island of Guam
