= Eprapah =

Eprapah (environmental area)
- Coordinates: 27°34′53″S 153°17′09″E
- Country: Australia
- State: Queensland
- Region: South East Queensland
- City: Victoria Point
- LGA: Redland City
- Established: 1928

Government
  - State electorate: Redlands
  - Federal division: Bowman

Area
  - Total: 0.39 km^{2} (0.15 sq mi)
- Elevation: 10 m (33 ft)
- Time zone: UTC+10 (AEST)
- Postcode: 4165
- Website: Eprapah (environmental area)

Eprapah, the Charles S. Snow Scout Environment Training Centre, at Victoria Point, near Brisbane, Queensland, Australia, is a noted ecological area within Redland City. Owned and managed by the Scout Association of Australia, Queensland Branch, the 39 hectares (96 acres) is home to a variety of habitats along Eprapah Creek to its north.

Its value is recognised as a declared environmental reserve by the local city council, and designated as a Scout Centre of Excellence for Nature and Environment (SCENES) site. It is possibly the only Scout campsite in the world devoted principally to environmental education.

Located at the intersection of Colburn Avenue, and Cleveland-Redland Bay Road, Victoria Point, the property was named for the creek travelling through its bounds. The name Eprapah is believed to be a corrupted form of the Biblical word Ephratah or 'fruitful land'.

== Environmental aspects ==
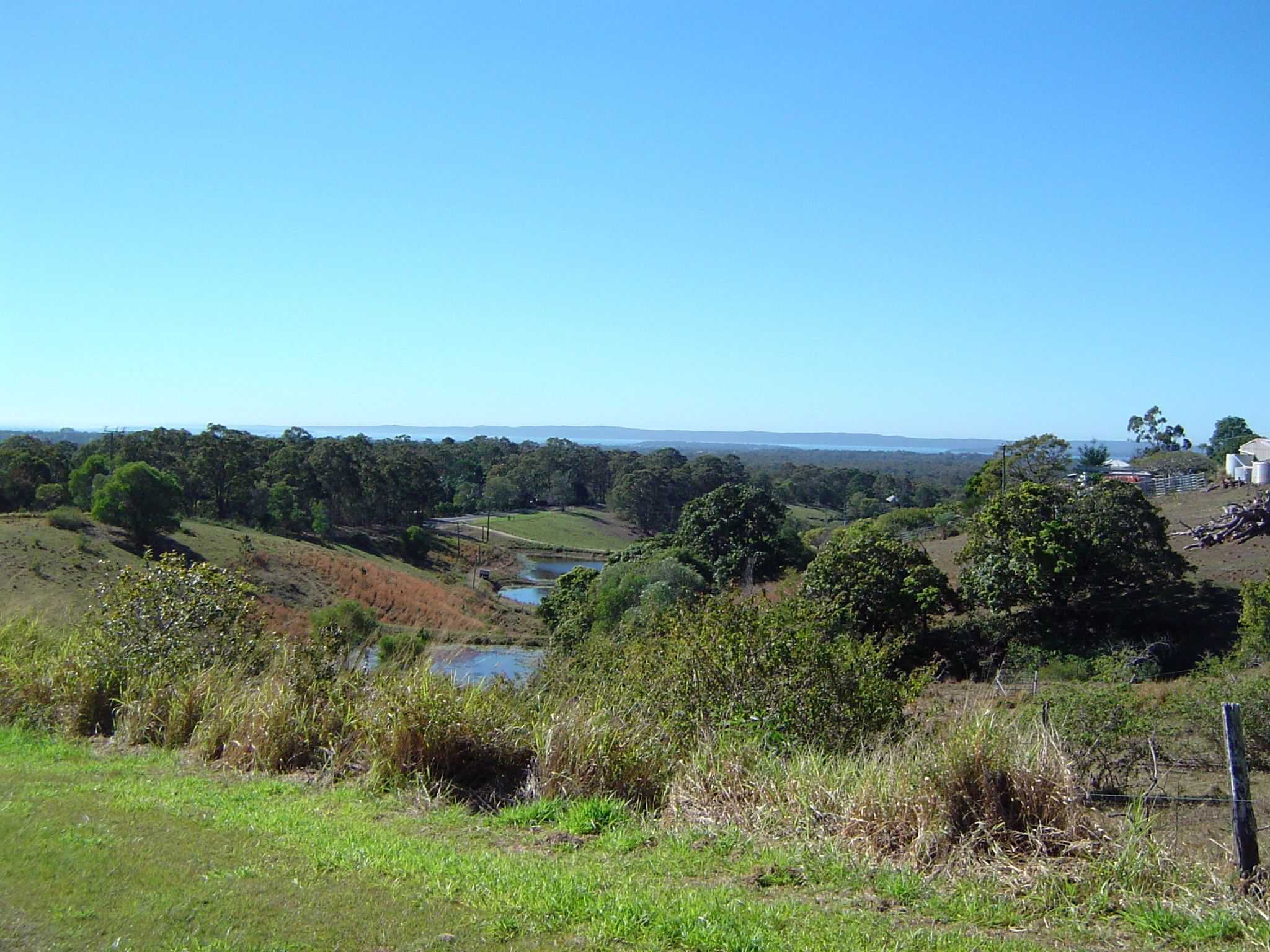
View east from Mount Cotton, 2014

The area is one of several areas of preserving environmental importance in Redland City, including Venman Bushland National Park and the nearby Girl Guide-run Kindilan Outdoor Education and Conference Centre.

Additional to its Indigenous, European, and Scouting heritage, Eprapah is home to koalas, together with a variety of ecosystems (riparian, estuarine, rainforest). The site is bounded to the north by Eprapah Creek, and forms a wildlife corridor from Mount Cotton. It is estimated the area is frequented by 120 species of plants, 125 birds, 24 mammals, 50 fish and other aquatic animals, 21 reptiles, and at least 60 species of insects.

Eprapah and the creek have been subject to scientific research including hydrological surveys and koala tracking studies.

=== Catchment areas ===
With the increase in urban density from agriculture to residential areas, Eprapah supports and complements the creek and area's ecological importance. Coast-side of the property is the Victoria Point Environmental Precinct, going to the edge of the Moreton Bay Marine Park.

To the east is the egret colony wetlands. Bounded by houses, the paperbark tea-tree-fringed lowlands are the avian home to egrets, magpie geese, osprey, whistling kites, all varieties of ibis. It is also the roosting area for a bat colony. Accessed from along Egret Drive, via Point O'Halloran Road, there are no established tracks for visitors. Redland City Council is the custodian of this rare site, and it is maintained by the community bushcare volunteers.

To the north-east, the Point Halloran Conservation Area is accessed from Orana Street, via Point O'Halloran Road. (Note: The point and conservation area are Port Halloran, while the road is Point O'Halloran. The name Halloran was in use prior to the 1930s, but appears the name was interchangeable.) Purchased in 1990, and opened in 1995, with a car park, and raised wet weather shelter, there are two walking circuits, and was billed as a 'koala ecotourism sanctuary'. A raised boardwalk takes visitors through freshwater reed vegetation, towards Aspect Drive (parts of the boardwalk are closed for repair by March 2015). The second walk of 650 metres (710 yd) is signposted to explain the changing vegetations of swamp she-oak (Casuarina sp.) forest and mixed woodland, to the edge of mangrove tidal mudflats. The area is well populated with large arboreal termite mounds, reflecting the waterlogged soils.

A bushlands refuge also exists upstream of Eprapah, on a southern tributary of Eprapah Creek, on Elysian Street, Victoria Point. Further upstream is the Sandy Creek Conservation Area beside Double Jump Road, Mount Cotton.

=== Geography ===
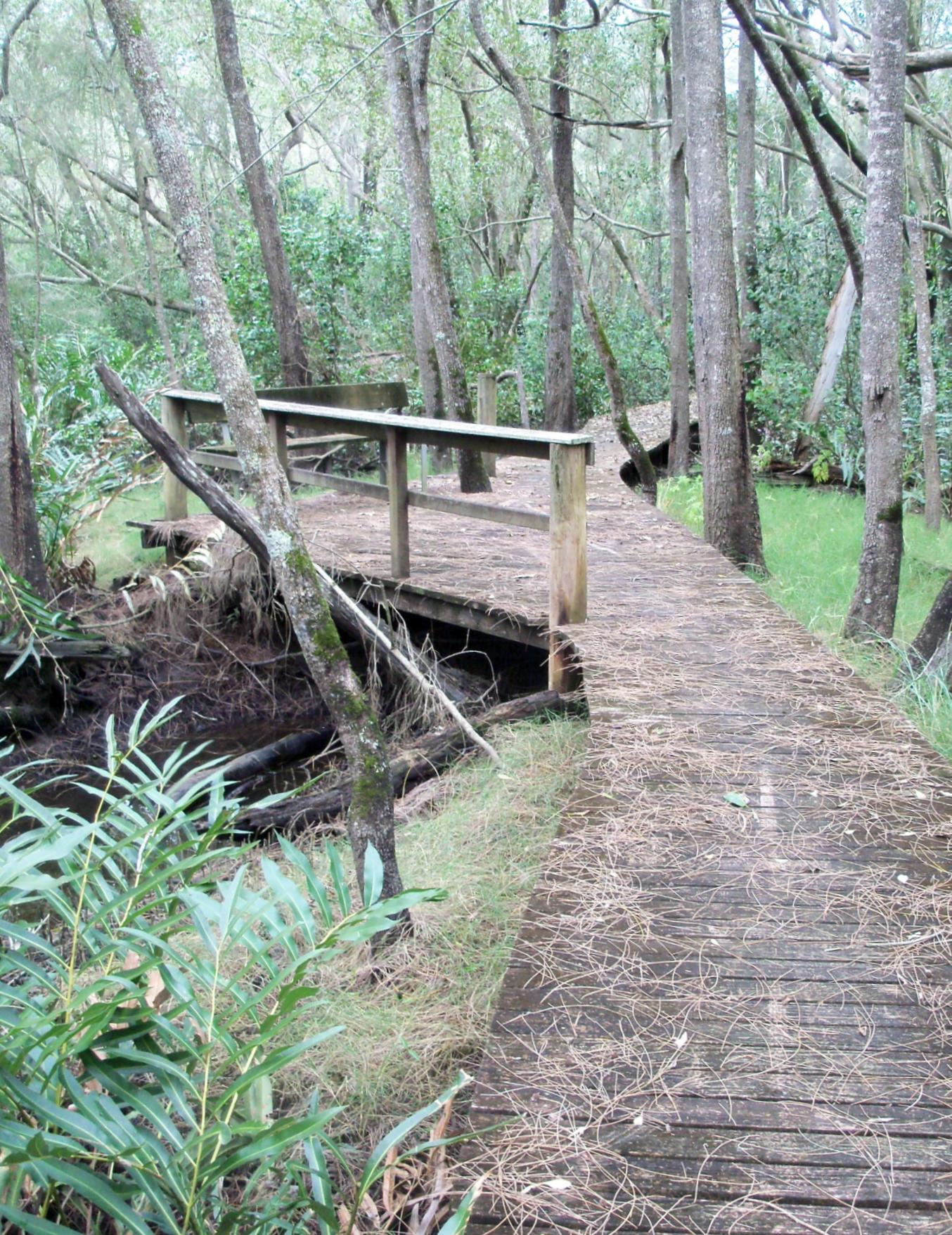
Eprapah Creek in the mangrove tidal zone

Eprapah is predominantly flat as it tends to the coastal edge of a water course that commences in the nearby weathered granitic outcrop of the 233 metres (764 ft) tall Mount Cotton. Soils are reflective of an area forming the creek entrance to a bay, including gleyed clays, alluvial deposits, and across the majority of the site, podsoiled loam.

Characterised by a short-lived freshwater flushing, and little or no dry season flow, the Eprapah Creek's estuarine zone to the north east is classified as wet and dry tropical/subtropical. A sewage treatment plant also discharges into the creek.

The development of the Victoria Point Shopping Centre area in the vicinity has greatly increased water run-off through the site. With roofs and bitumen-covered car parks, the non-porous surfaces has seen periods of rainfall turn the sedate riverlet to Eprapah Creek turn into a torrent, with an associated increase in jetsam.

Given the various ecosystems existing in a small area, surrounded by increasing pressures of urbanisation, results in Eprapah having great environmental interest and local value.

=== Vegetation ===
With sandy ridges of low sclerophyll forest, there are also other vegetation types present of rainforest remnants, sheoak or Casuarina sp. forest stands, Melaleuca swamps, salt meadows, and mangrove stands. The site hosts one of the important food trees of the koala, Queensland's faunal emblem, is the blue gum (Eucalyptus tereticornis). Other species around include the scribbly gum (Eucalyptus signata).

The beautiful golden-flowering Eprapah wattle (Acacia fimbriata var perangusta) was previously considered to be a species in its own right, but is now considered to be an extreme form of another species, the Brisbane golden wattle or fringed wattle. It can be distinguished by the dimensions of the phyllodes, gland position, and the flower colour.

Certain patches of the site have had specific plantings where weeds have been removed. Representative of the local area, the site has battled overgrowths of non-native plant pests such as Lantana camara and groundsel (Baccharis halimifolia), as well as mosquitoes and ticks. The site committee has an eradication plan removing from site invaders such as Camphor laurel trees, Asparagus fern, and plants not native to the area. Much propagation of ornamental plant species is occurring through the birds having eaten the fruits from surrounding areas. There are some issues caused by illegal dumping on the property's peripheral.

=== Fauna ===
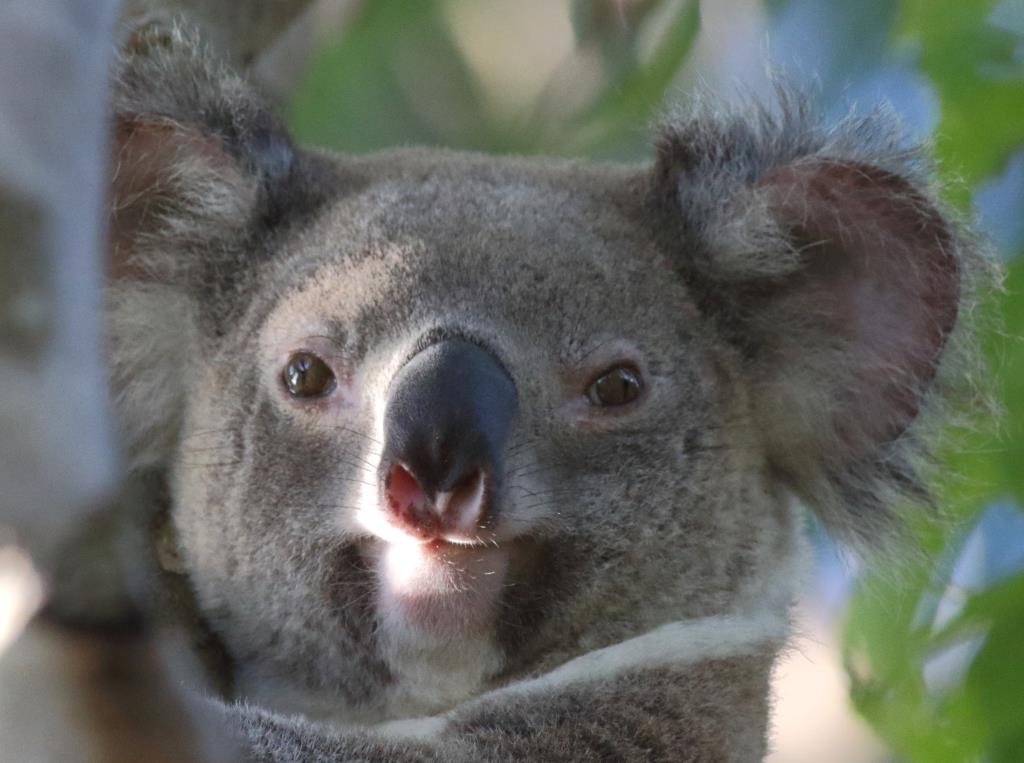
One of Redland City's koalas

The Eprapah link wildlife corridor from Mount Cotton along Eprapah Creek allows the relative unencumbered movement of fauna, and encouraging biodiversity within the Redlands. Established in 1990 in a joint venture between Scouts and the shire council, it also includes another Scout property, Karingal. Eprapah itself is home to koalas (Phascolarctos cinereus), bandicoots (Isodon macrourus), black-tailed swamp wallabies (Wallabia bicolor), grey kangaroos (Macropus giganteus), kookaburras, large arboreal termite mounds, and a sea eagle.

Koalas in eastern Australia are being classified as vulnerable and added to the threatened species list. Numbers have dropped by forty percent in Queensland and by a third in New South Wales over the past twenty years. Subject to increasing pressures brought about by urbanisation (such as roads, dogs) causing habitat fragmentation, overcrowding at Eprapah has seen a drop in the population due to loss of or over-eating of available food trees. They have also become susceptible to various diseases including chlamydia.

Habitat research has also occurred on the site over the years. For example, koalas have been captured, their health checked, and radio collars fitted.

The freshwater area is also home to the near-threatened tusked frog (Adelotus brevis). The only Australian frog where the male is larger than the female of the species, they have a distinctive 'tok-tok' clucking sound. Habitat encroachment, introduced fish, and a fatal skin disease fungus have contributed to their vulnerability.

The platypus (Ornithorhynchus anatinus) once resided in the creek pond near Cleveland-Redland Bay Road, but increased turbidity and lessening water quality has meant the animal has not been sighted for some years.

For migratory birds, the property is also within the East Asian–Australasian Flyway, and the Moreton Bay Ramsar wetlands. Within 1,000 metres (1,100 yd) east of Eprapah is an egret colony wetlands at Victoria Point.

The standing pond, supplied and flushed with rains, contains a variety of aquatic life include Gambusia fish and other species, whirligig beetles, backswimmers, dragonfly nymphs, and mayfly nymphs. The tidal part of Eprapah Creek of course is home to fish, molluscs, and crabs.

== Indigenous heritage ==
The home of the Quandamooka, Noonoccal, Koobenpul tribe and part of the Jagera/Yagera/Yugembeh language group people, Eprapah was part of their range from Redland Bay (Talwarrapin, or cotton wood tree that was endemic to the area) to the Brisbane River (Mairwar).

Victoria Point's Aboriginal name of Warra Warra possibly means mussels, while Coochiemudlo refers to the red rock that forms the small island.

A midden was discovered on-site but its location has since been lost.

Many plants at Eprapah were used by the Aboriginal people, including the red ash or soap tree (Alphitonia excelsa) as a poison, the edible and crunchy small fruit of the lillypilly (Syzygium smithii), black bean or Moreton Bay chestnut (Castanospermum australe) as a food source (after long treatment), and the paper bark (Melaleuca sp.) for carrying containers amongst other uses. A native food garden has been established at the south-west corner of the property, near the Mungara visitor centre.

== European presence ==
The area including Eprapah, prior to Queensland becoming its own colony in 1859, was used for stocking cattle. Victoria Point was named in the 1840s, surveyed in 1859, with 'Eprapah Creek' becoming a post office at Holzapfel's store in 1890. The Colburn family, (Note: Daniel William Colburn has also been reported with a surname of Colbourn."Passing of the pioneers. Mr. D. W. Colbourn". The Brisbane Courier. 15 June 1918. p. 12. Archived from the original on 18 January 2023 – via National Library of Australia.) giving their name to the road now acting as the southern border of the property, settled in the 1860s.

Mostly farmers, other activities in the area included timber-getting. Nearby Link Road served as the log rafting area, to be floated to the mills at Cleveland and Wellington Point. Sugar plantations, custard apples, grapes, passion fruit, pawpaws, pineapple, tomatoes, cabbages, cucumbers constituted some of the farming activities. The market gardens supplied the Sydney and Melbourne with fresh seasonal pineapples.

As the divide between the Tingalpa and Cleveland local government divisions, financial debates commenced in 1898 about the construction of a 600 feet (180 m) road bridge over Eprapah Creek. The bridge was later improved in 1924.

Eprapah continued to be used as a district name until about 1915. The 1930s continued to see Victoria Point as a popular holiday destination, with trips to Coochiemudlo Island. Farming and tourism continued as the main post-World War II activities, when in the 1970s, crop farming progressed to flower growing. Throughout this period, Eprapah remained intact as a bushland property.

== Scouting heritage ==
Eprapah Scout environment training centre
- Country: Australia

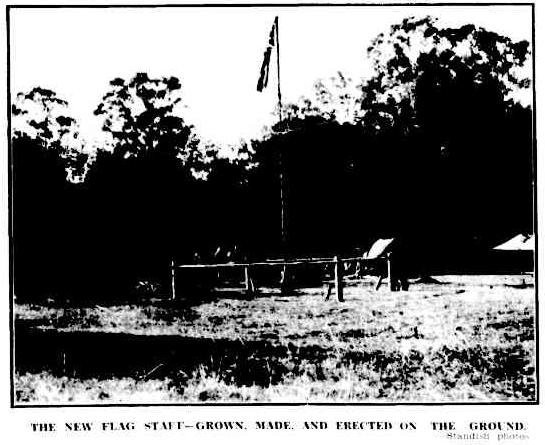
Flagpole, 1928

In April 1928, the property of Eprapah was purchased with money from the Bob Monteith Memorial Fund trust. Robert Henry Monteith (born 1892) was killed in action at the Battle of Mont Saint-Quentin, France, on 2 September 1918. (Note: Born in Brisbane in 1891, Bob Monteith was the only son of Henry Monteith (1862–1930) and Katie Rose Waldie (1867–1954). After studying at the Brisbane Grammar School in 1906, he became a stockbroker, residing at his father's Ironside Estate, Toowong, before enlisting on 31 May 1915, aged 23. Serving with the army service corps at Gallipoli, he then went with the 26th Battalion to France, and was mentioned in dispatches for his leadership. He is buried in Peronne, Somme, France. Henry Monteith in June 1924, as chairman of the directors of the Brisbane Newspapers and involved in Scouting administration, gave £5000 to the Boy Scouts' Association, as a memorial to their son.) His father was involved in the Scouting movement and the parents created the deed in trust remembering their son.

The thirty-nine hectare site hosts a separate local Scouting entity, the Victoria Point Scout Group. The current group was formed in 1969 and group operates from a former World War II military hut which originally served as a hospital at Greenslopes.

Additional to a warden's cottage and local Scout den, the three main structures are the sleeping shelter ('bunkhouse'), the 1974 Grey Owl activity shelter and associated 1976 Biolab study shelter, and the 1993 Mungara visitor museum. Mungara is a restored on-site hand-made brick whitewashed cottage, now fulfilling the functions of meeting room, educational facility, and site museum. The name itself is the local Indigenous word for the Queensland blue gum tree. The Grey Owl shelter was destroyed by fire in January 2019.

The former Westpac Bank of the 1982 Australian Scout Jamboree held at Collingwood Park, Queensland became the site's warden's cottage. It was the residence of several on-site caretakers. After falling into a state of disrepair, the building was demolished 1 July 2015.

Its present purpose is encompassed by aspects of the generally universal Scout Promise and Law,

- A Scout is a friend to animals (the Australian 6th of 10 laws; c. 1910-).
- A Scout cares for natural resources (the Australian 8th of 9 laws; 1973-)
- A Scout cares for the environment (the Australian 10th law, 1990s)

The Australian Scout Environment Charter sets out eight positions on how a scout can care for the environment, including: Taking part in activities and projects that encourage education through nature and the environment, learning about nature and the environment, and action for nature and the environment.

The Scouting movement's founder, Robert Baden-Powell, 1st Baron Baden-Powell, wrote many references to the importance of the environment and the education value of the environment:

- For those who have eyes to see and ears to hear, the forest is at once a laboratory, a club and a temple.
- As a Scout, you are the guardian of the woods. A Scout never damages a tree by hacking it with his knife or axe. It does not take long to fell a tree, but it takes many years to grow one, so a Scout cuts down a tree for a good reason only – not just for the sake of using his axe. For every tree felled, two should be planted.
- Travel and reading and Nature study are all part of self-education.
- By continually watching animals in their natural state one gets to like them too well to shoot them. The whole sport of hunting animals lies in the woodcraft of stalking them, not in the killing.

=== 1928 to 1953 ===
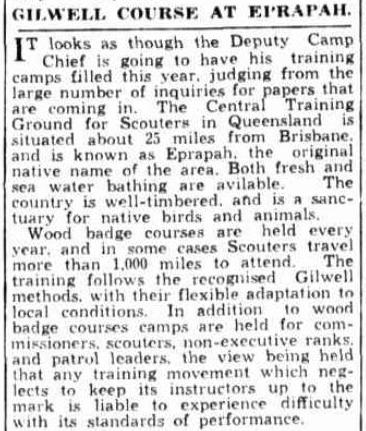
Training course advice, 1937

The centre was the State's leader training centre although youth member camping was permitted. Leader training was conducted in other locations in Queensland too, but Eprapah was the principal establishment.

The first training course was on 4 June 1928. Leaders would draw their rations from an area now known as the Beaver Shelter, and also marked by the stumps of the cook's table, and a dining seat area. Youth member activities included training patrol leaders for emergency responses, constructing bridges, rafting, Scouts' own (religious observance), and water fights.

Baden-Powell visited Queensland in May 1912, March 1931, and briefly in December 1934. It was on his second visit on 26 March 1931 that his shoe print was immortalised in concrete at Eprapah. A copy is now in place, with the original held at the Scout Museum at Baden-Powell Park, Samford, Queensland. The State's governor, Sir Leslie Orme Wilson, also visited the site as the Chief Scout of Queensland through the 1930s.

The first of the site's two totem poles, the 18 feet (5.5 m) pole and notice board, an owl was carved during a November 1931 training course, and at its foot, B.-P.'s boot print.

The chapel area was fenced off to stop wandering cattle. A large buttress stump was capped in concrete and the Scout badge with 'Old Scouts' set within (today, the concrete cap remains).

Various teams continued their improvements to the training ground, engaging in building construction and pioneering works. 'By 1933, '[i]n between times of clearing lantana and carrying out the preliminary surveys for the draining of swamps, the Rovers and Men Scouts [of Brisbane] have been busy on the erection of a gate of typically Scouty design at the entrance of their section of Eprapah. Above the lintel of the gate will be the figure of a crocodile, carved out of a log of wood. A forked end will represent the paws, in which pointed pegs will appear as fearsome teeth. A swishing branch will serve as a tail to the wooden 'monster'.'

An old scout hall was moved from Redland Bay to Eprapah in 1934.

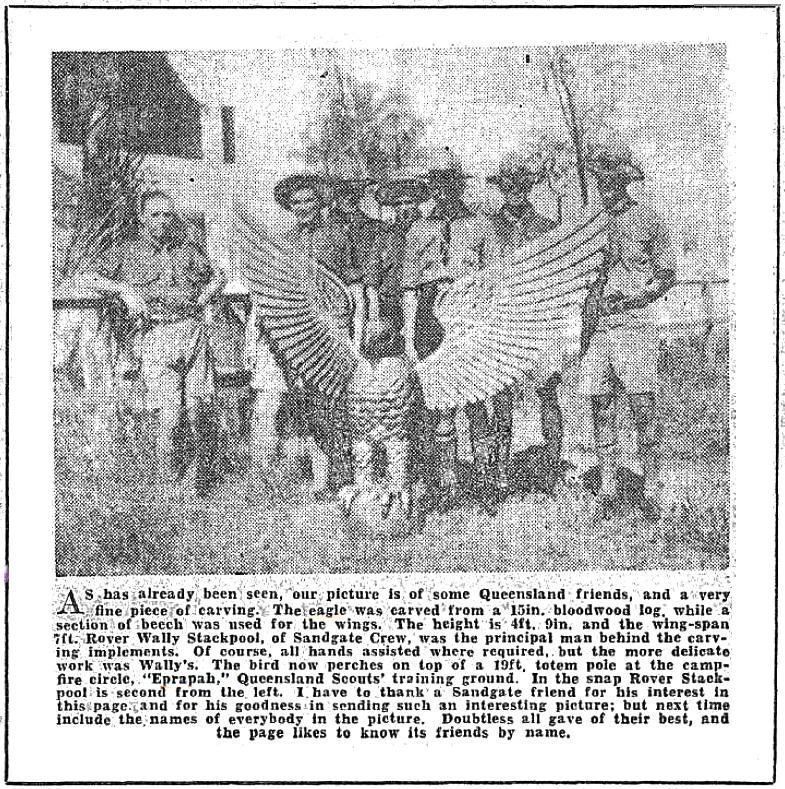
Eagle totem pole, carved 1937

In 1937, the campfire circle was accentuated by an eagle totem pole. Rover Scouts from Sandgate spent two years carving a life-sized eagle with a body was from local bloodwood, and wings of beech. The eagle, painted in bronze, stood 6 feet 4 inches (1.93 m) wide and 4 feet 9 inches (1.45 m) on top of a 19 feet (5.8 m) totem pole. Light from the fire reflected off the eagle.

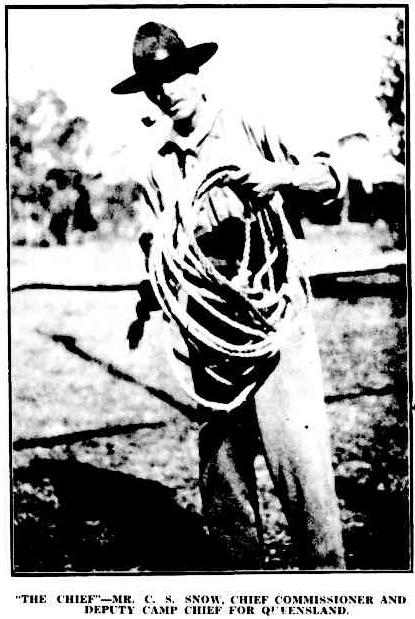
Charles Smethurst Snow (1882–1953)

Various Scouting personalities would later lend their names to various structures on the property, as well as to Scouting locations and events in Queensland, including:

- Charles Smethurt 'Chief' Snow (20 September 1882 – 7 June 1953 (aged 70)). A watchmaker and jeweller, Snow became a scoutmaster with one of the first four Brisbane troops in 1908. He was elected the first chief scoutmaster for Queensland (today, 'chief commissioner'), and encouraged the purchase of Eprapah. His name is also attached to a Scout district in north Brisbane, and the leader training centre at Samford.
- Kenneth Alexander 'Kauri' Boyd (1905–1976 (aged 71)). The straight-standing Boyd was an optometrist, starting as a scoutmaster at Buranda continued to become an assistant international commissioner.
- Thomas 'Grey Owl' Gloster (1855 – 13 January 1941 (aged 86)). A Cleveland identity, Gloster was a soldier in the Royal Munster Fusiliers.
- John Victor 'Running Stag' Marquis-Kyle (1 May 1897 – 1981 (aged 83)). Marquis-Kyle's contributions to Eprapah included carving the poles for the Providore, and the owl totem pole.
- Louis Varsey 'Beaver' Masters (1885 – 15 May 1964 (aged 78)). A Scout district on the Sunshine Coast. Beaver Masters is interred at the then Sir Leslie Wilson campsite at Florence Bay, Magnetic Island, Townsville.
- James Alfred 'Nebo' Manderson (7 May 1901 – 9 August 1964 (aged 63)). Manderson was a signwriter, Rotarian, Wolf Cub leader, and a known story-telling character.
- David Thain 'Kiwi' Weir (16 March 1889 – 1973 (aged 83)). With his trademark tobacco pipe, Weir rose to be the central Queensland region field commissioner, akela leader, and deputy camp chief (leader trainer roles). Since 1946, each Easter Scouts from Nambour to Bundaberg compete for the Kiwi Woggle (a huge animal's vertebra as the woggle on a standard Queensland scout scarf).

=== 1954 to 1972 ===
In late 1953, the Queensland Boy Scouts' Association purchased a camping property to be called Baden-Powell Park, on Cash Avenue, Samford. The Kulgun training ground was established for scout leaders. As a result, Gilwell training ceased at Eprapah, and items were transferred to B.-P. Park, such as the Eagle totem pole in 1955.

Apart from its hiatus as a regular scouting activity site, a big fire went through the property scarring many trees and destroying structures. Part of the west side of the property was probably resumed to road development as the Cleveland-Redland Bay Road was widened.

=== 1973 to present ===
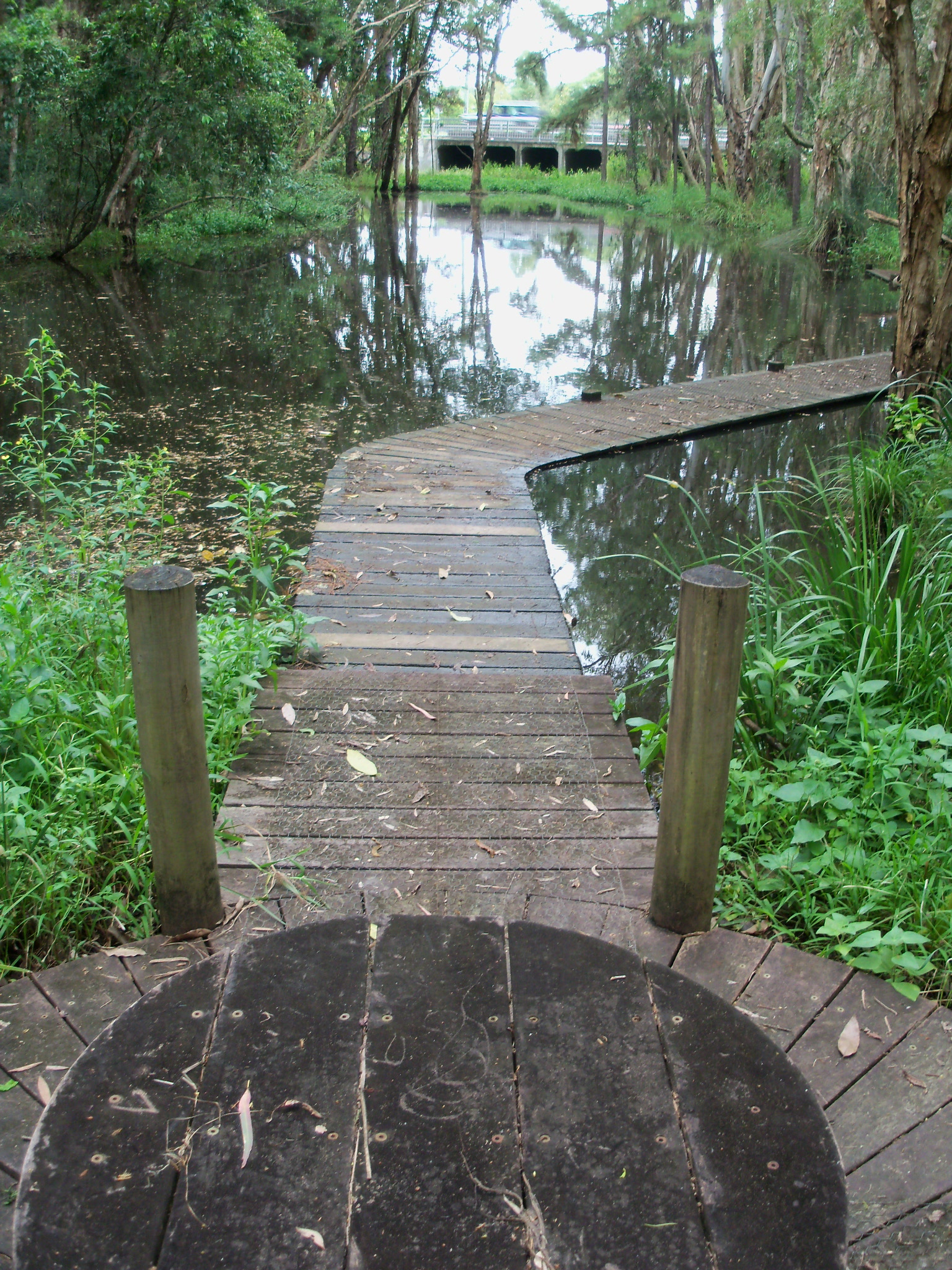
Freshwater ecology activities location

In 1973 the property was resurrected for conservation field studies by the Scouting organisation. This resulted in the rezoning of Eprapah in 1975 by the Redland Shire Council for special purposes.

Charles Smethurst Snow was the first chief commissioner of the League of Boy Scouts in Queensland, a primary instigator for the property purchase, a conservationist, and the scouting centre's name honours his memory.

Site management has varied post-1973, and several Scouting formations influence its care and direction:

- Branch commissioners. The leaders are responsible for Queensland-wide delivery of the Scouting programme in specific fields, in this instance, the environment. The inaugural BC was Dr Bernard Stone OAM (25 September 1926 – 17 April 2005 (aged 78)), Branch Commissioner for Conservation (1973-), together with his wife Anne Beatrice (OAM). Stone was a scientist with the Commonwealth Scientific and Industrial Research Organisation (CSIRO), and Scouting's National Advisor on Environmental Education for almost twenty years. Anne (1928–2010) was the daughter of 'Chief' Snow;
- Friends of Eprapah;
- Eprapah Scout Fellowship (in 2005, the Friends of Eprapah Scout Fellowship); and
- State site committee.

The outline still exists of a wooden suspension bridge built by the Manatunga Rover Crew (from Morningside, Brisbane) and Australian Army Reserve. The bridge was opened on 4 June 1978.

Declared a Scout Centre of Excellence for Nature and Environment (SCENES) site prior to 1985, for a long time it was one of thirteen in the world, and the only one in the Southern Hemisphere.

The Scout Association hosted the September 1985 week-long live-in Asia/Pacific Environmental Conservation Seminar ('APECS 85') for 33 Scouting and Guiding delegates from many countries. Presenters included Dr Bernard Stone (CSIRO), Dr Graham Saunders (Director, Queensland National Parks and Wildlife Service), Dr Angela Arthington (School of Environmental Studies, Griffith University), and Dr Bob Johnson (Queensland Herbarium).

The Mungara building had an extension that was officially opened on 19 December 2001. Additionally, a historic 'small silver plate in memory of Jimmy Tabau, Darnley Island's first Australian Native Scouter, was formally returned to Mungara by Branch Heritage Coordinator Tom Roberts. This plate survived Eprapah bushfires in the early 1960s, later was resurrected from ash and displayed at Samford for 16 years.'

The 2011–2012 period saw the installation of a fauna exclusion fence, a 1.8 metres (5.9 ft) high fence with smooth metal sheeting at the top, along the property perimeter, to prevent wildlife from leaving the property and entering public roads and endangerment.

A heritage walk was opened in 2014, and signage marks the various historic Scouting features of Eprapah.

The Scout's State Environment Education Team regularly conducts field day or weekend programmes for members of the Scout and Guide movements. The curriculum is based around the World Scout Environment Programme (formerly the World Conservation Badge) and other scout merit badgework. The activities include examining various aspects of the site's many ecosystems, pond dipping, removal of stands of weeds and area regeneration through tree planting, and night-time spotlighting.

For both accessibility, and diversity exploration and appreciation, there are various tracks (generally identified by a colour) and board walks, including:

- Koala Glade, covering a riverlet riparian zone to open forest;
- Brown Trail, around the chapel area;
- Green Trail, following Eprapah Creek; and
- Blue Trail, from a riverlet riparian zone, along a raised boardwalk through the mangroves and salt marsh habitats.

Several trails have numbered posts for points of interest, corresponding to information in a visitation booklet. Near the corner of Colburn Avenue and Cleveland-Redland Bay Road, there are also two activity areas of interest:

- senses trail circuit, with plants of various textures; and
- native plants arboretum of wild foods, medicinal, and endangered plants (established 2001).

Facilities today include a Scout camping area and a pack holiday shelter with bunk accommodation for over fifteen persons. Various non-Scouting groups have hired the facilities including artists weekends.

The environmental reserve is maintained by members of the Scout Fellowship, persons undertaking community service as part of a judicial correction order, and other interested persons. Members of the community can join the fellowship, and also consider involvement in the site committee.

== Gallery ==
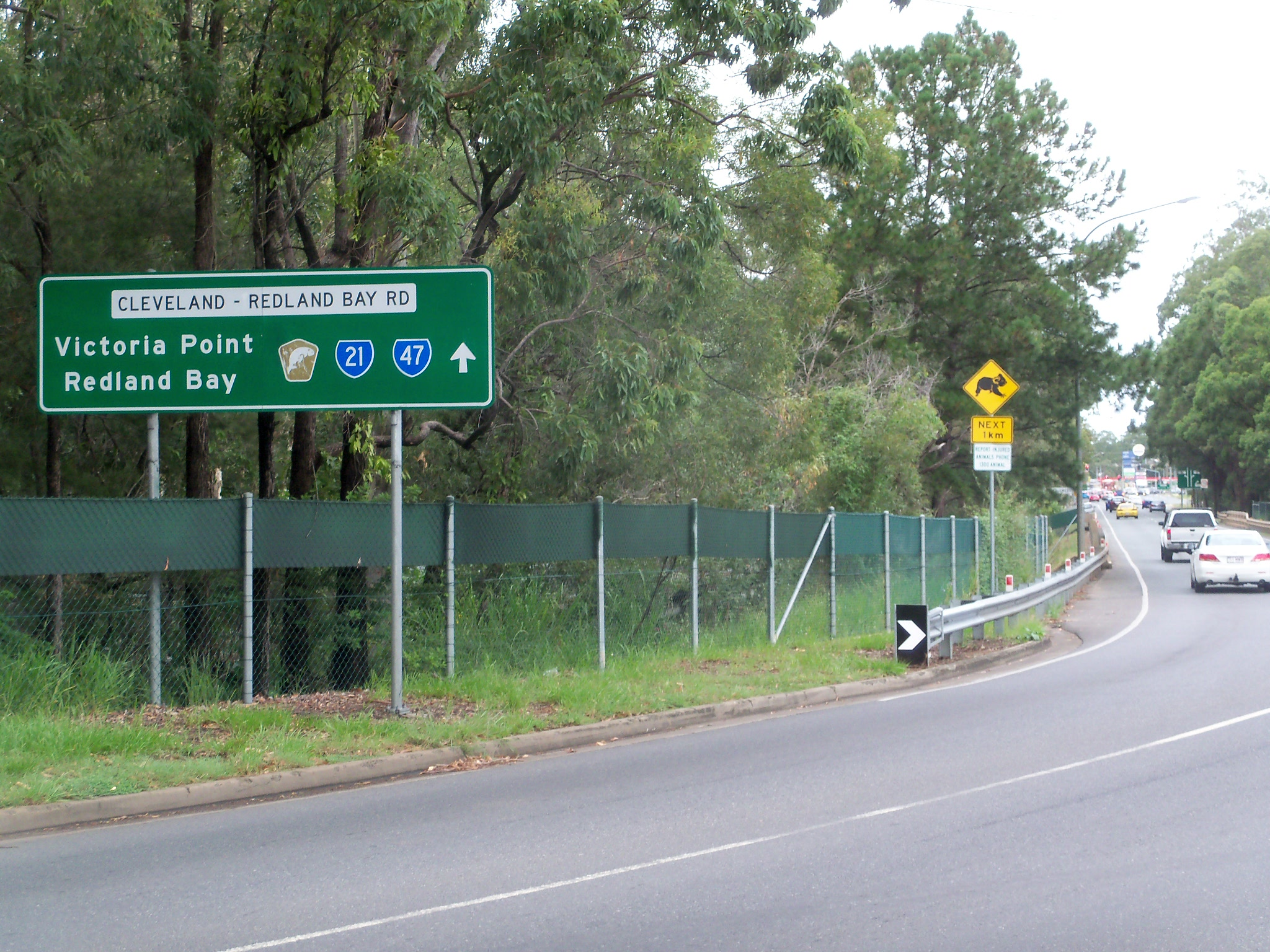
Looking south from the north-east corner, showing traffic density and dangers to wildlife

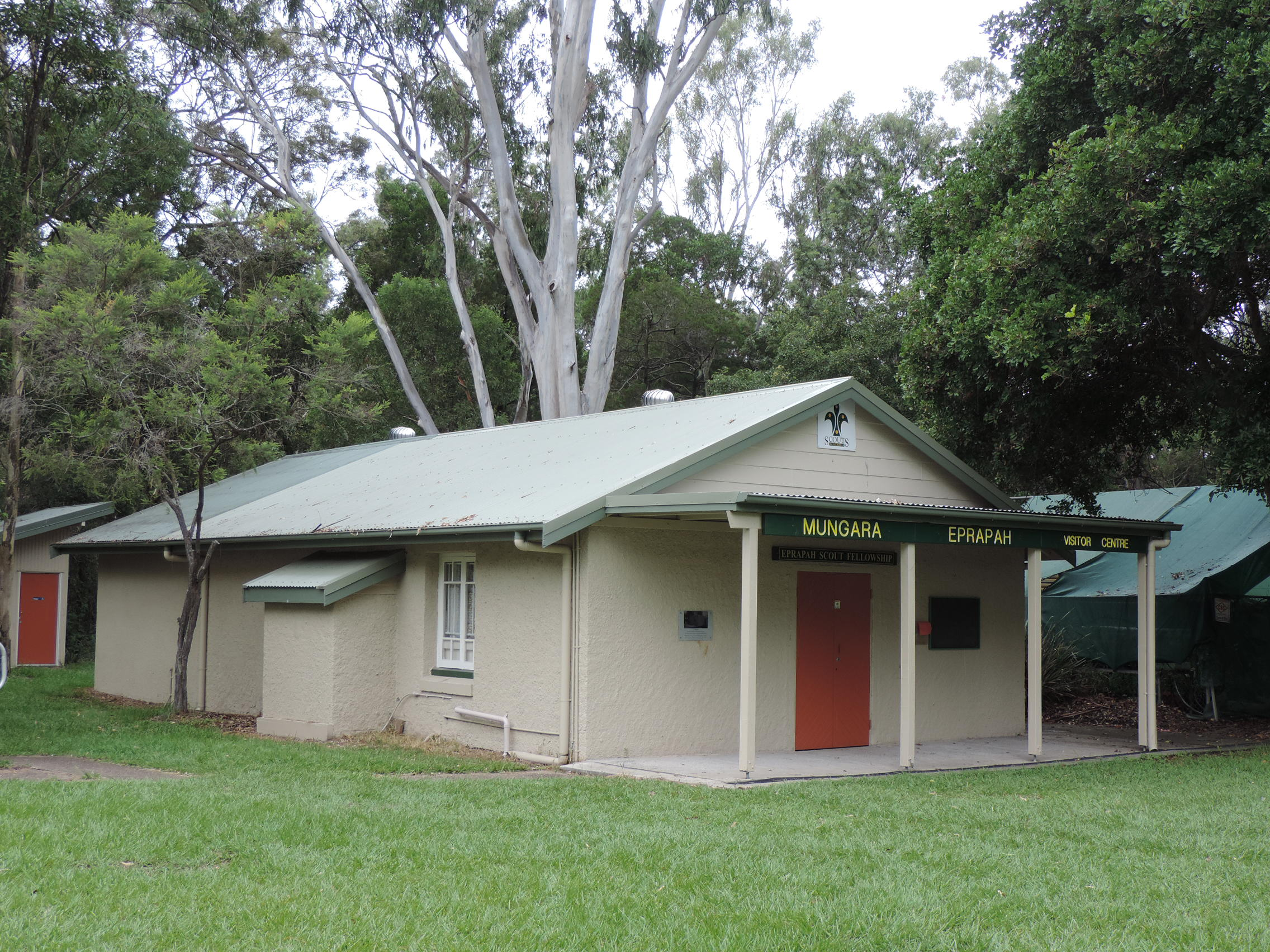
Mungara visitor centre, the original caretaker's cottage

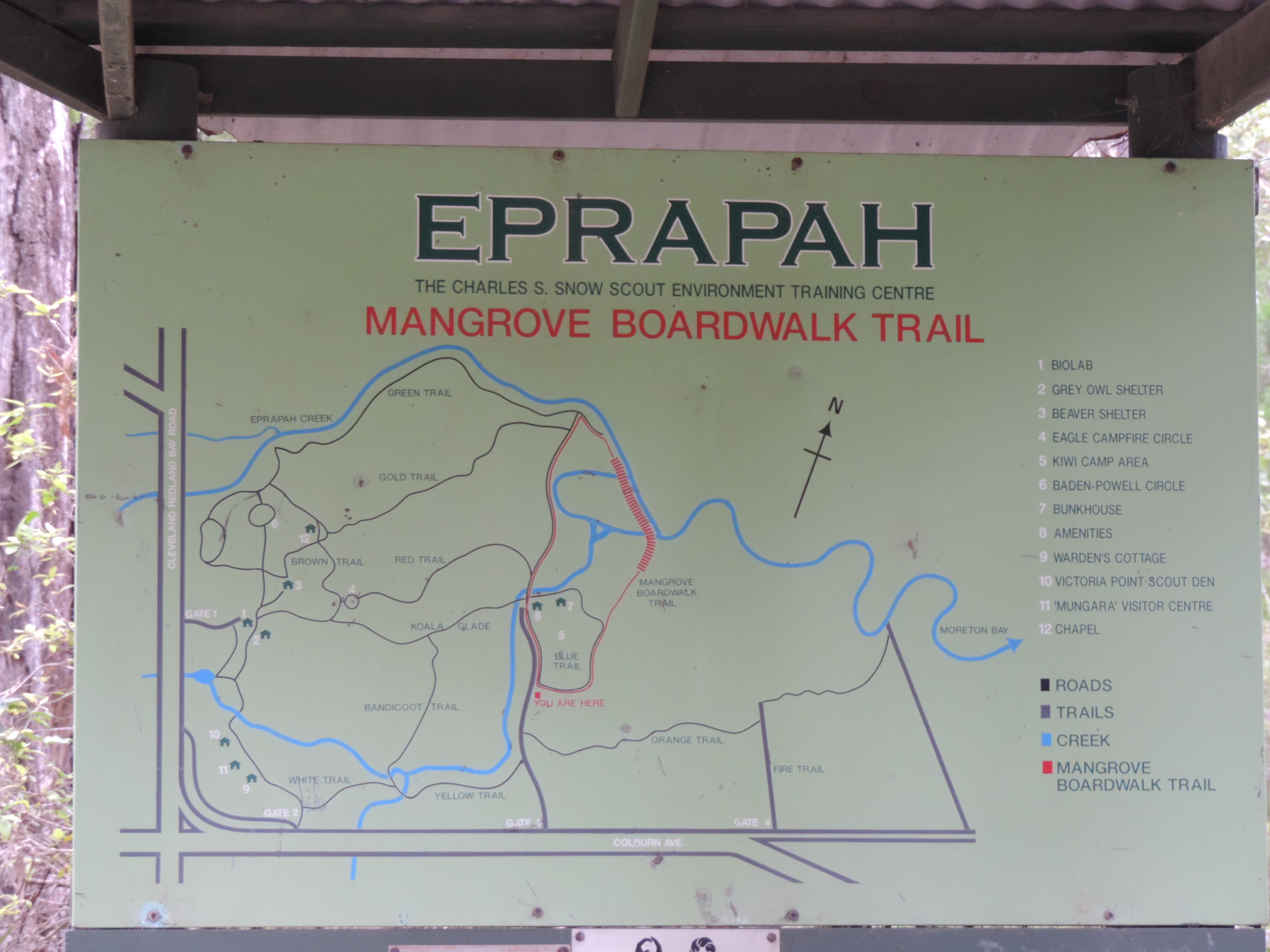
Eprapah site map

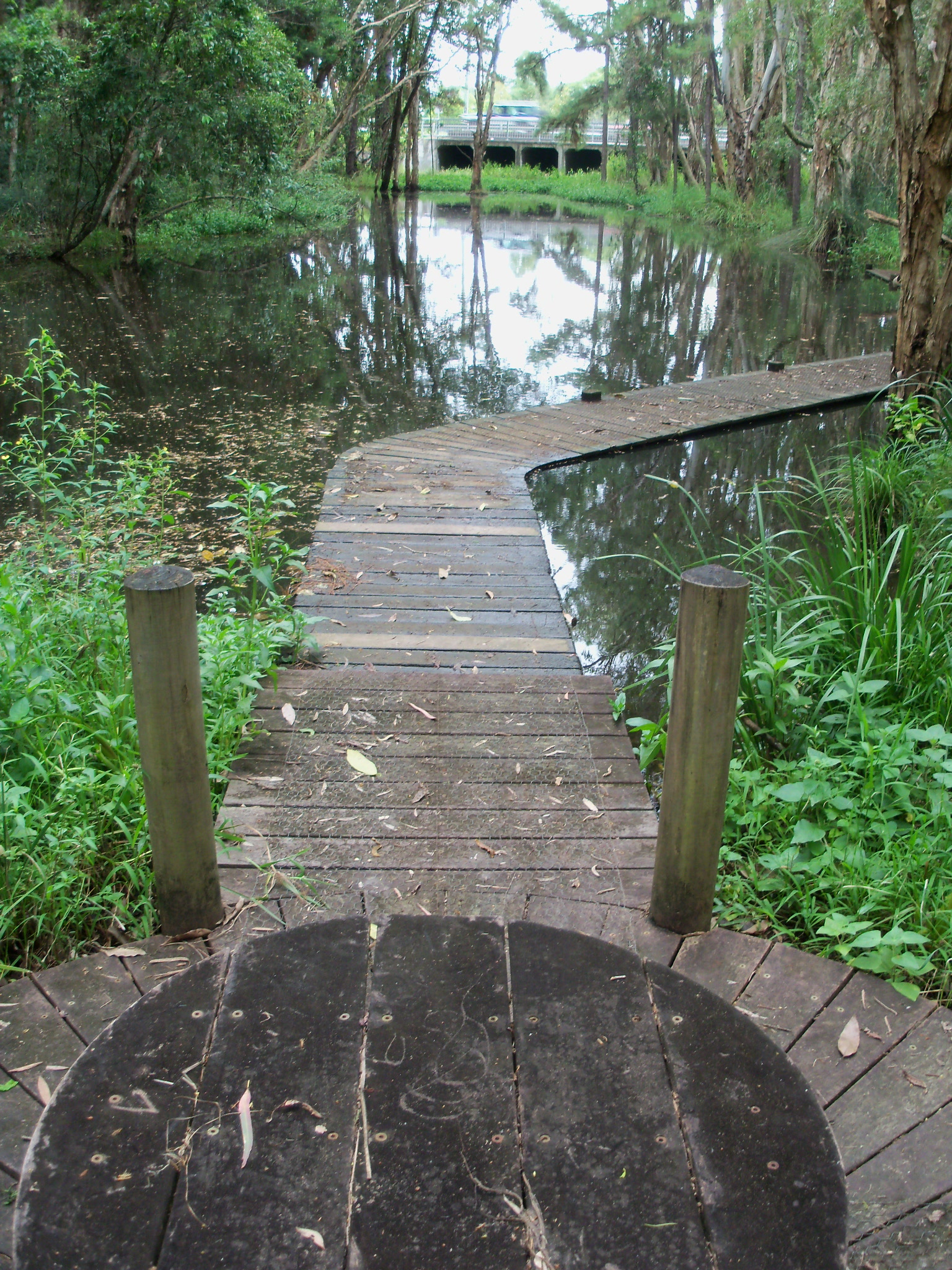
Freshwater pond, with Cleveland-Redland Bay Road in background

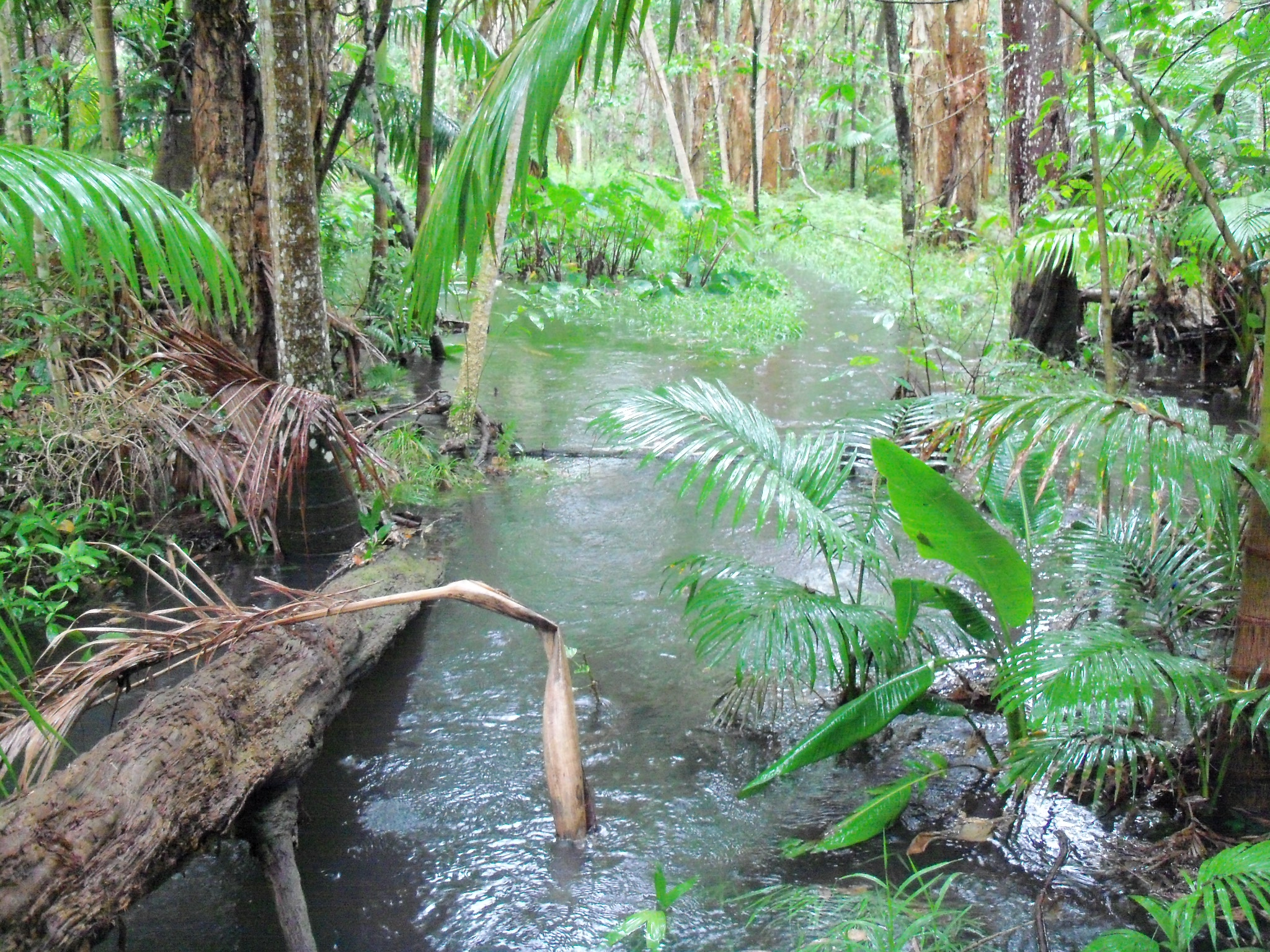
Koala Glade stream

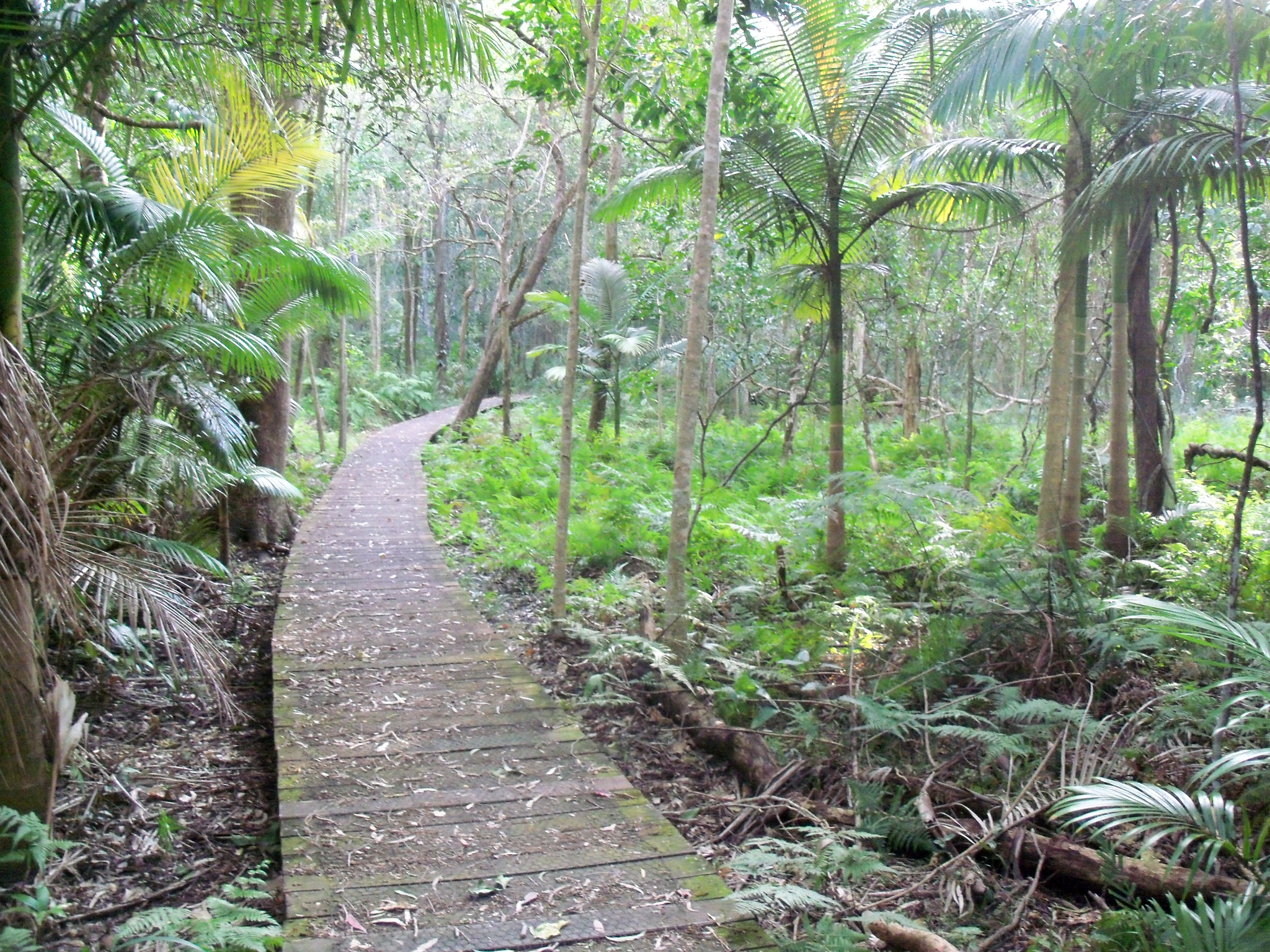
Koala Glade trail

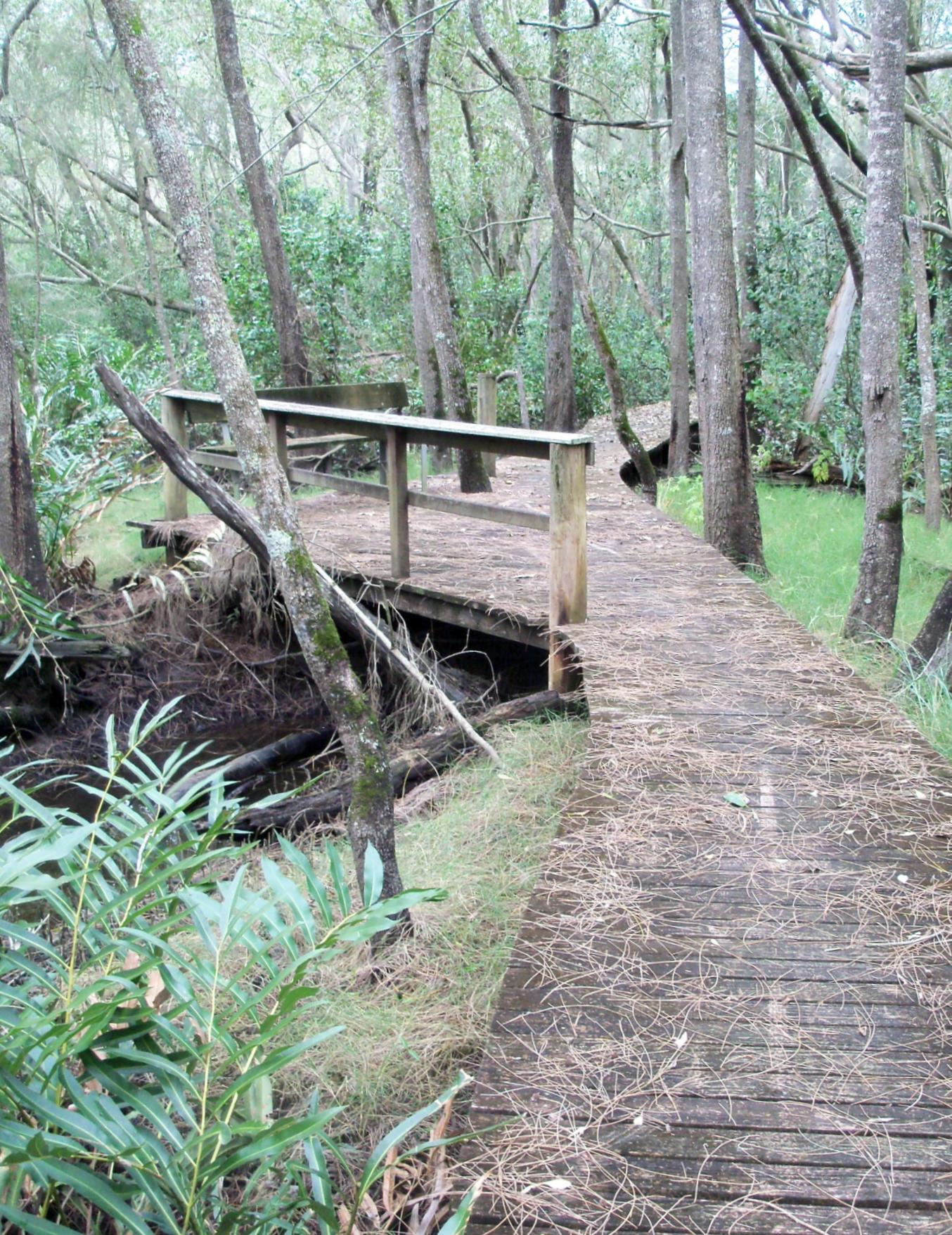
Boardwalk along the edge of the Eprapah Creek in the mangrove tidal zone

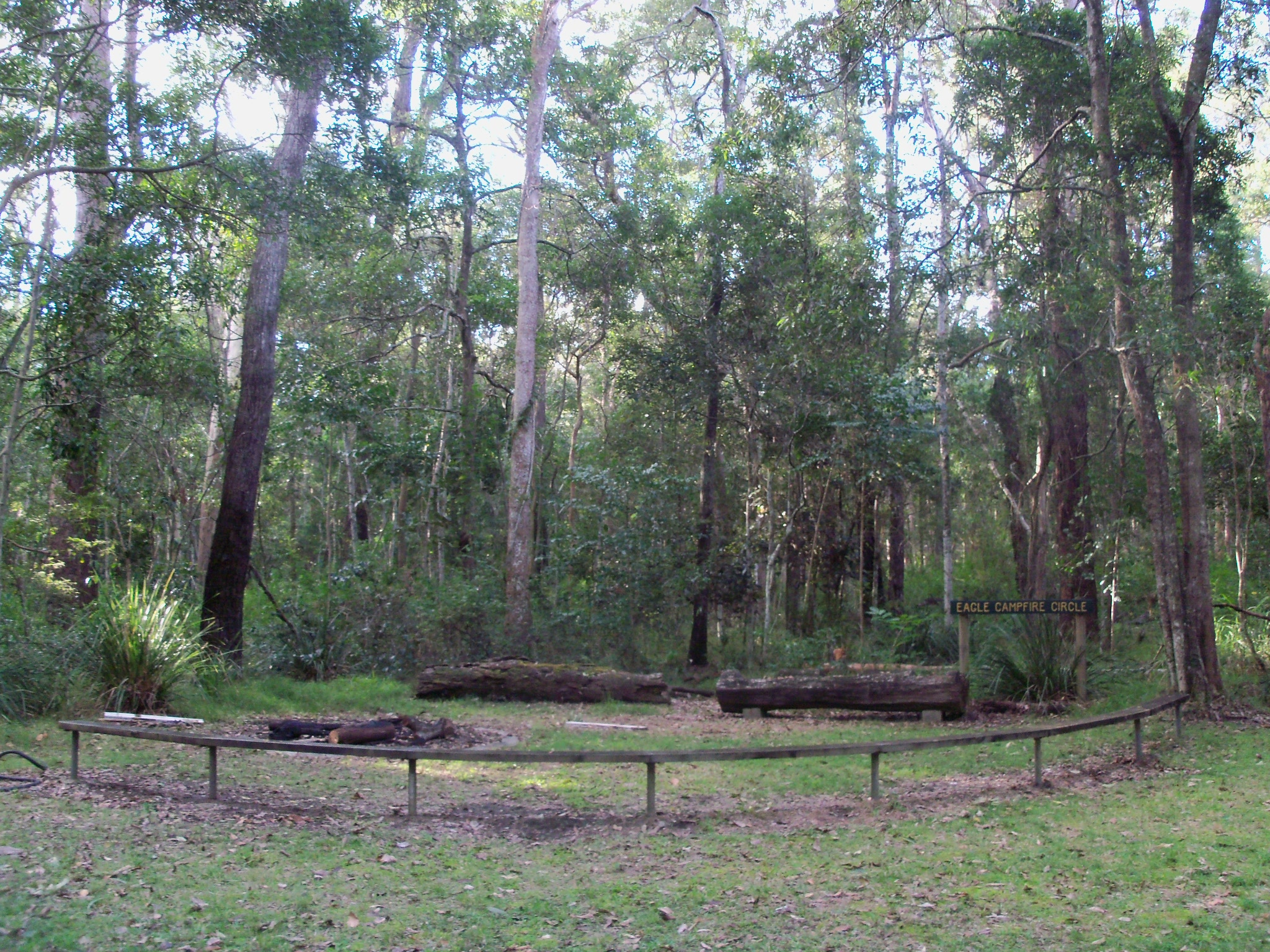
Eagle Campfire Circle

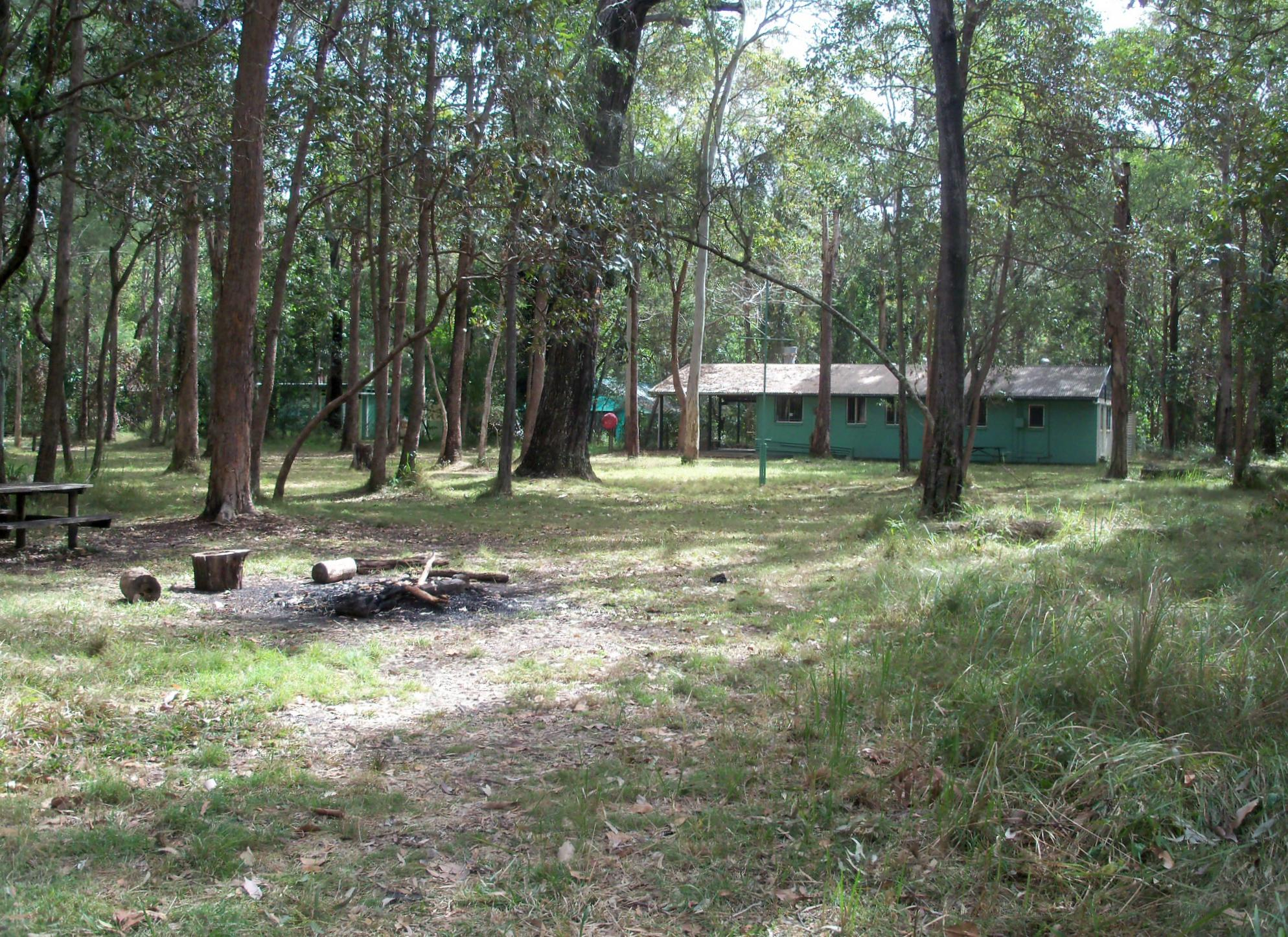
Kiwi camp ground and bunkhouse

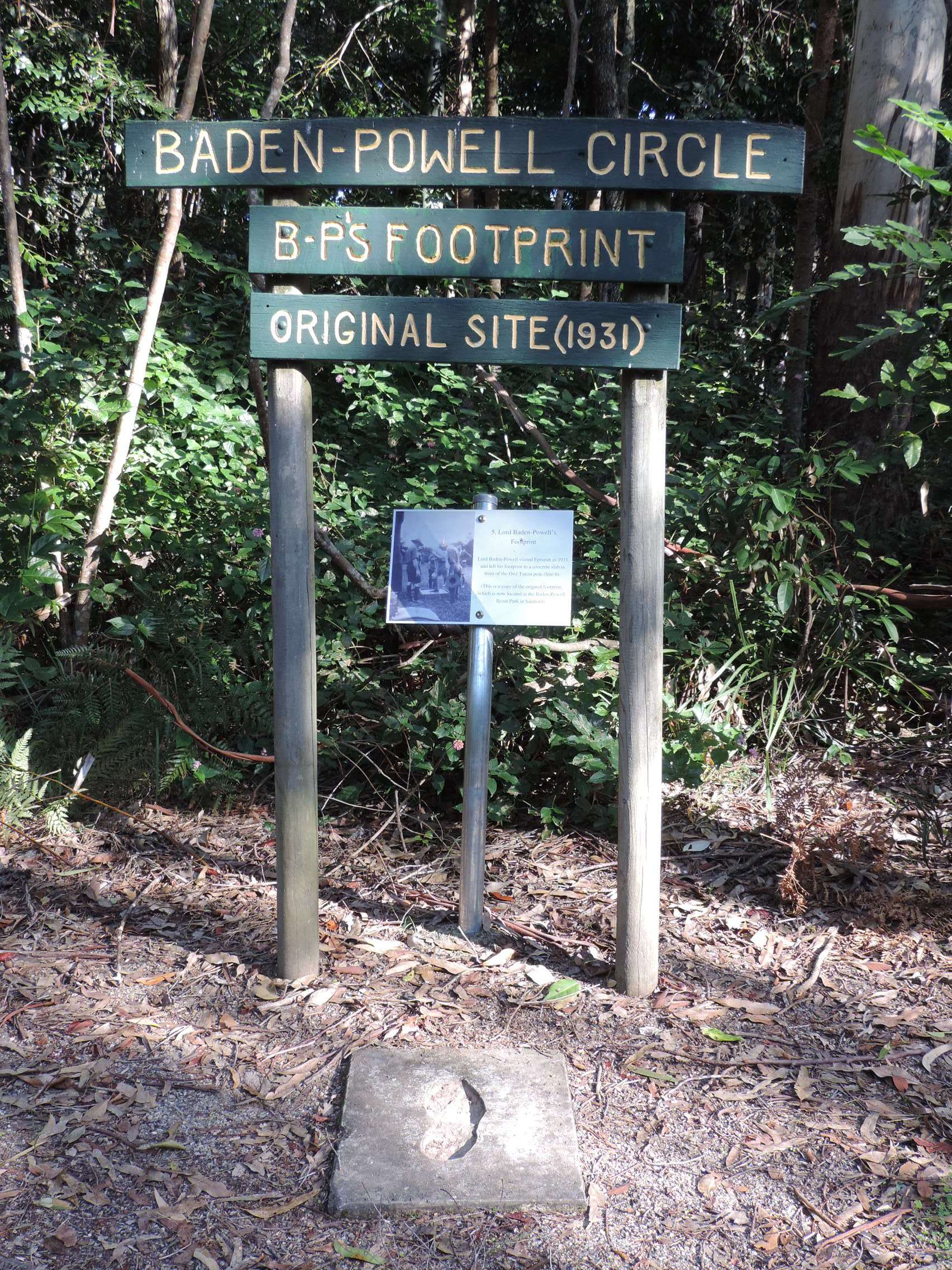
Reproduction of Baden-Powell's shoeprint from March 1931

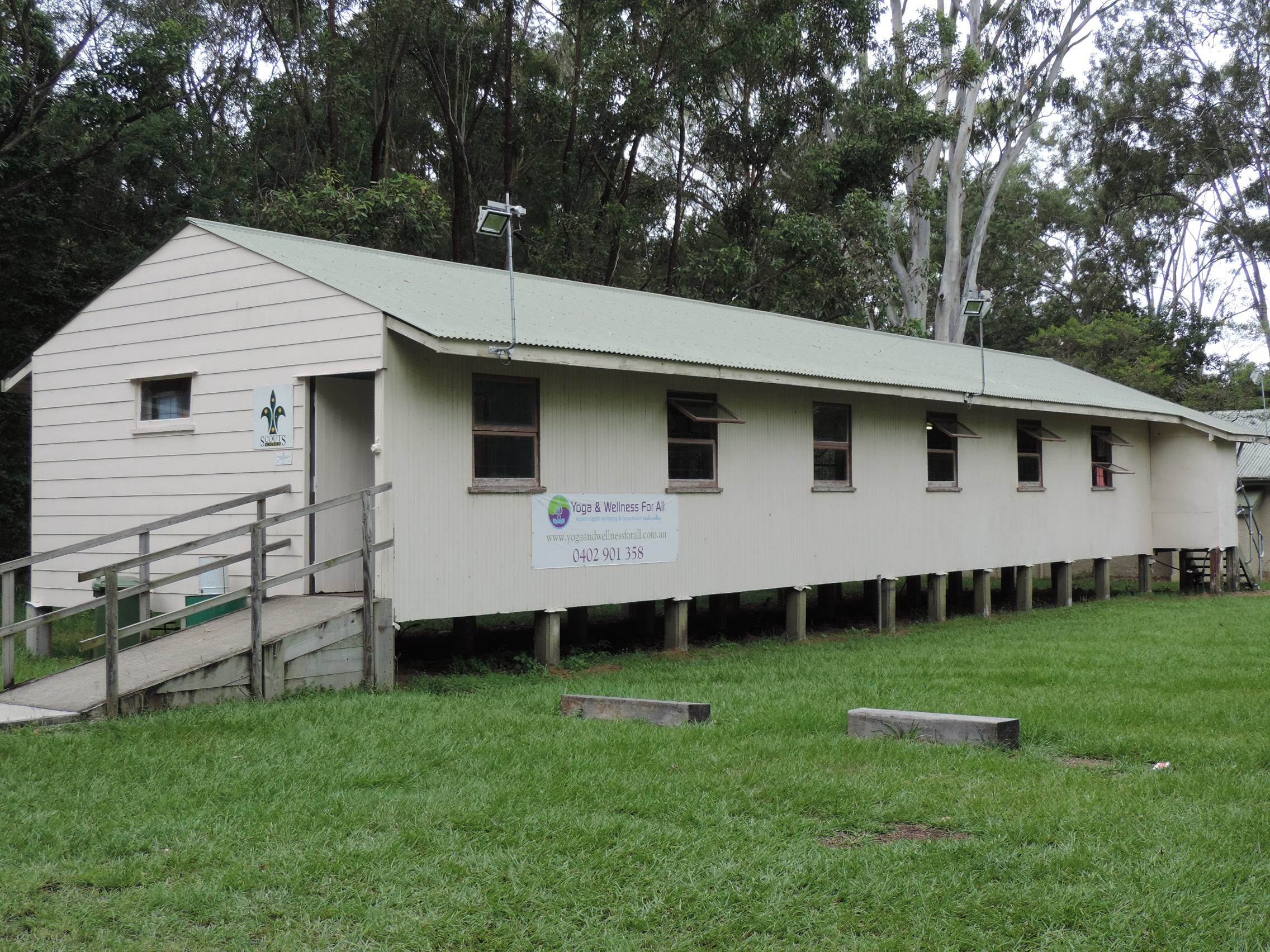
Victoria Point Scout Den

== See also ==
- Brisbane native plants
- Redland City
