= Cascade Boy Scout Camp =

- U.S. National Register of Historic Places
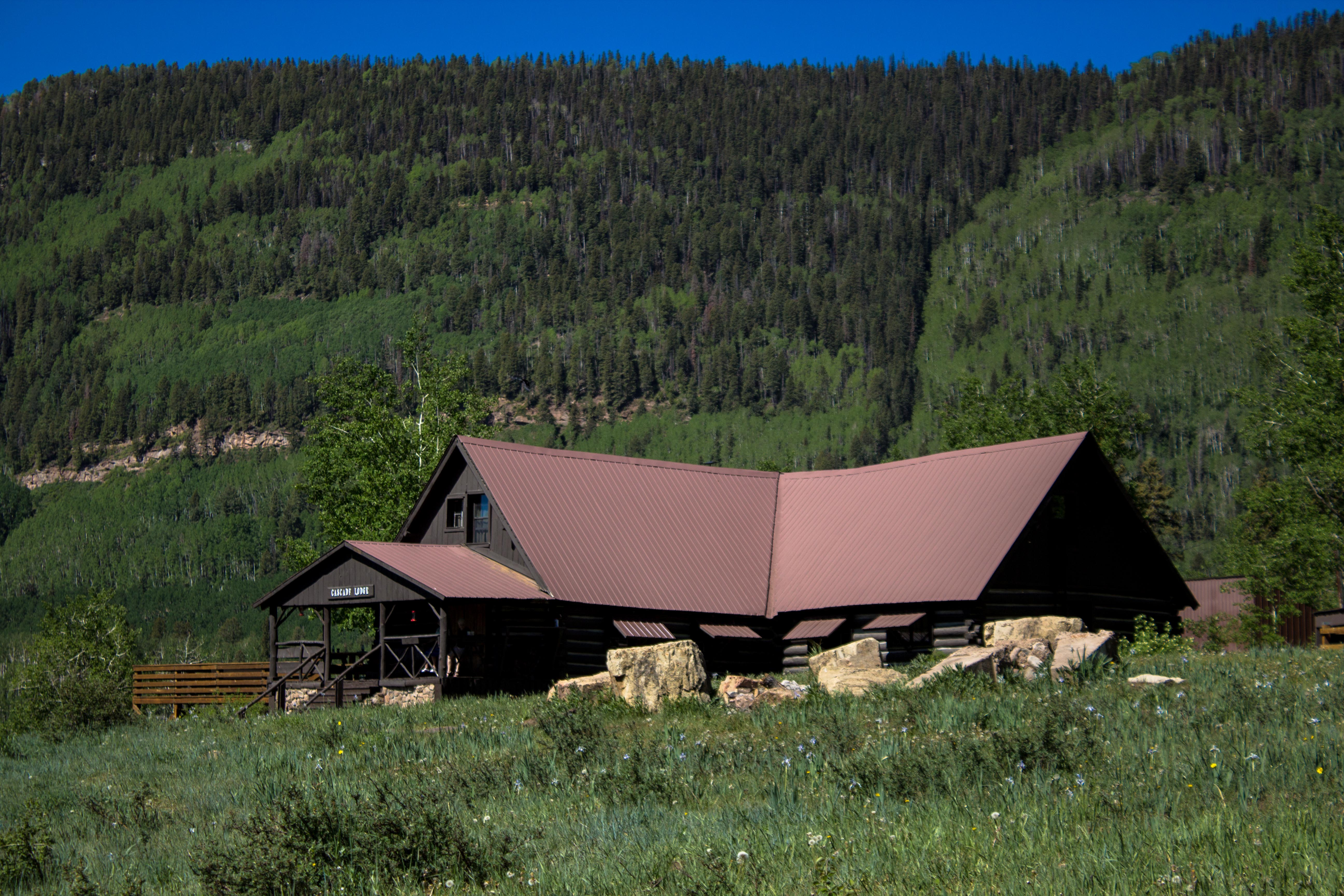

- Location within Colorado Location within the United States
- Nearest city: Durango, Colorado
- Coordinates: 37°39′24″N 107°47′57″W
- Built: 1928
- Architect: Frank Lechner, Bob Yeager
- Architectural style: Rustic
- NRHP reference No.: 88001529
- Added to NRHP: September 8, 1988

Cascade Boy Scout Camp is a camp near Durango in San Juan County, Colorado, United States that is associated with Scouting in Colorado. The lodge building, also known as Cascade Lodge or Boy Scout Lodge, was built in 1928 and was listed on the National Register of Historic Places in 1988. It is also listed on the Colorado Register of Historic Places.

The two-story lodge building is built in the shape of a cross. Constructed by local residents adjacent to the Million Dollar Highway, it was intended for use by various community organizations, including the Boy Scouts, but also including other youth groups. Located in the San Juan National Forest, the site is not now operated as a summer camp.

Sold into private hands in the 1930s, it is now a Christian retreat center.
