= Marianne Elser Crowder =

Marianne Elser Crowder (April 23, 1906 – June 4, 2010) was, from at least 2007 until her death, the oldest living Girl Scout in the United States.

She joined the Wagon Wheel Council Troop 4 in 1918 and got her Golden Eaglet, then the Girl Scouts of the USA's highest award.

She enrolled in the Perry Mansfield School of Dance and Theater in Colorado and studied with many of the leading pioneers of modern dance, including Louis Horst, Doris Humphrey, Helen Tamiris, Hanya Holm and Daniel Nagrin. She later operated her own dance studio in Colorado Springs, Colorado, and headed the dance department at Colorado College. She resigned her position to marry writer Paul Crowder and they moved to Palo Alto, California around 1940. For 19 years she taught in Stanford University's Drama Department and choreographed dances for major Stanford productions for the Drama and Music Departments. She also taught She also started courses in corrective exercises with the Palo Alto Adult Education program and the Menlo Park Recreation Department and continued teaching until she was 95.

In 2007, the Wagon Wheel Council named Crowder the nation's oldest Girl Scout after it conducted a nationwide search and sifted through council archives.

== Death ==
She died on June 4, 2010, at her Palo Alto home at the age of 104 from pancreatic cancer. She was survived by two daughters, ten grandchildren and twelve great-grandchildren.
