= Ephrath =

Historical name for Bethlehem

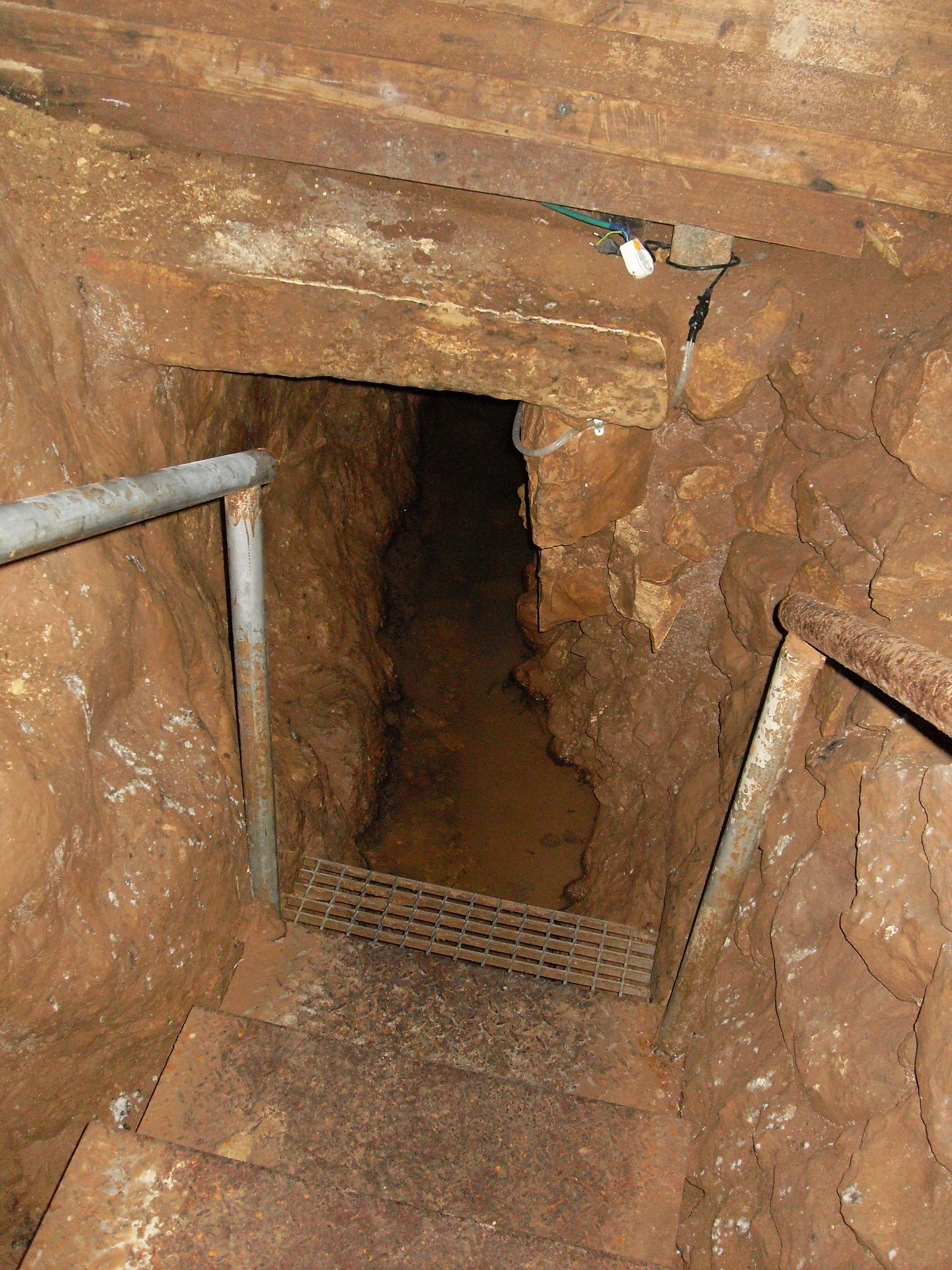

Ephrath, Ephrathah and Ephratah are variant spellings of the same Hebrew name (Hebrew: אֶפְרָת \ אֶפְרָתָה) mentioned in the Bible.

Ephrath usually refers to the ancient name for Bethlehem in Judah. It originally referred to the region around Bethlehem and was later identified with the town itself. (Genesis 35:16-19, Micah 5:2). A person from Ephrath is called an Ephrathite (as a geographic tribal designation; 1 Samuel 17:12; Ruth 1:2).

It is also the name of Caleb's second wife, who bore Hur, an ancestor of Bethlehem's founders.

The name comes from the Hebrew root פָּרָה (parah) and means to be fruitful, to bear fruit, to increase.

== Biblical place ==
A very old tradition holds that Ephrath refers to Bethlehem, as the first mention of Ephrath occurs in Genesis, in reference to the place on the road from Bethel where Jacob's wife Rachel died giving birth to Benjamin and was buried. Rachel's death on the way to Bethel in recalled by the ancient Rachel's Tomb located at the city's entrance.

Ephrath, Ephratha and Ephrathah are names/descriptions for members of the Israelite tribe of Ephriam, who were living within the borders of the land allocated to the tribe of Judah, as well as being possible founders of Bethlehem.

Ephrath, or Bethlehem, is connected to messianic prophecy, as found in the book of the minor prophet Micah: "But thou, Bethlehem Ephratah, though thou be little among the thousands of Judah, yet out of thee shall he come forth unto me that is to be ruler in Israel." This specifies the town of Bethlehem in the southern part of biblical Israel (Judah/Judea), distinguishing it from the Bethlehem located in the north (Galilee). In the New Testament, both Matthew 2 and Luke 2 state that Jesus was born in Bethlehem of Judea.

== Personal name ==
Caleb's second wife was called Ephrath (or Ephrathah).

== Locations named after Ephrath ==
Some modern places named after Ephrath include:

- The Israeli settlement of Efrat, near Bethlehem
- The town of Ephrata, Pennsylvania
  - The Ephrata Cloister, Pennsylvania, United States.
- The town of Ephratah, New York
- The town of Ephrata, Washington, United States.
- The locality and creek of Eprapah, Victoria Point, near Brisbane, Queensland, Australia
  - Nearby Coochiemudlo Island also has an Eprapah Street.
- Eprapah, the Scout environmental education training centre, located at Victoria Point, near Brisbane, Queensland, Australia
