= Scouting in Colorado =

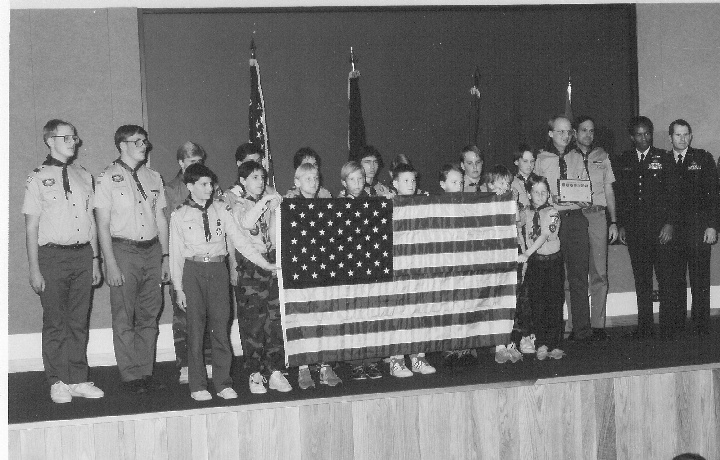
- Challenger Flag

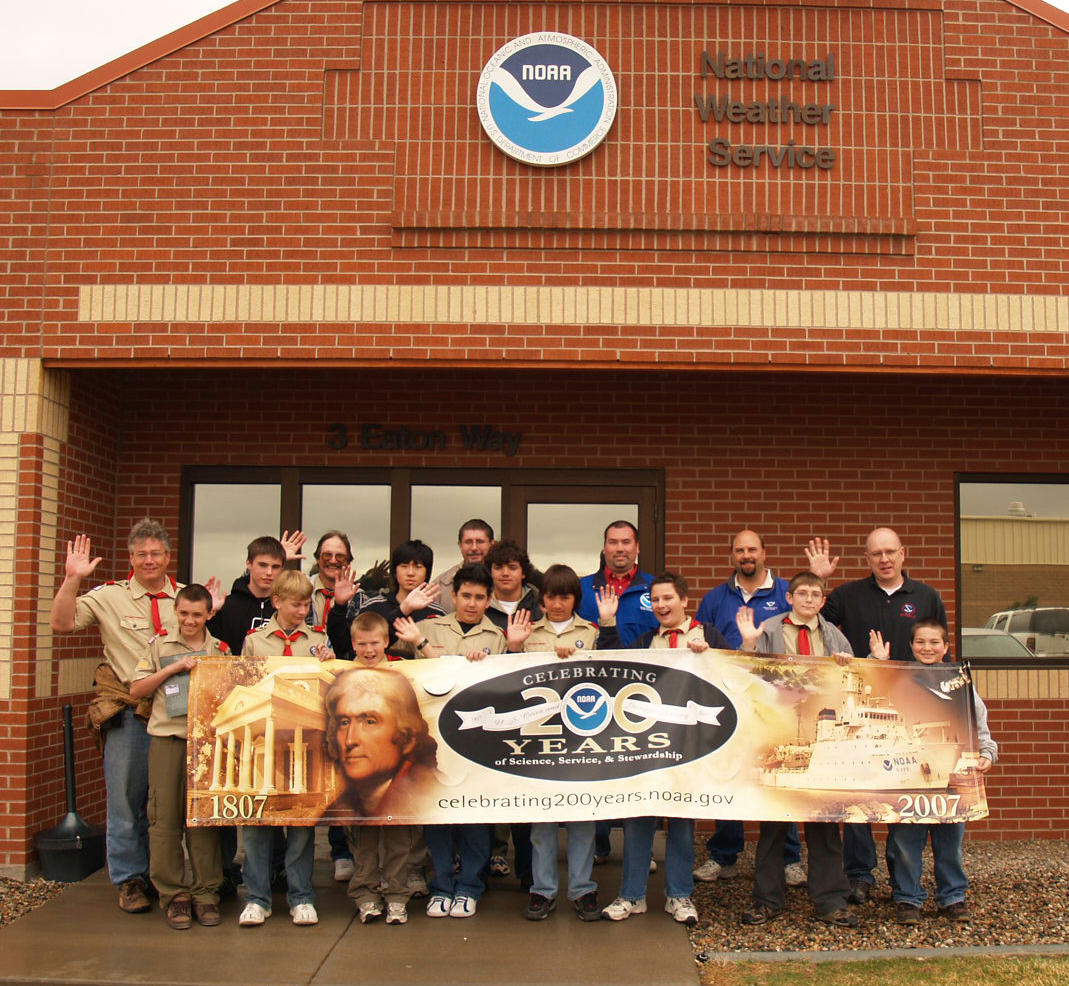
- Colorado Springs Scout Troop 27 at the Weather Forecast Office in Pueblo, Colorado

Scouting in Colorado has a long history, from the 1910s to the present day.

== Early history (1910–1950) ==
Scouting got a brisk start in Colorado. The Denver Council was founded in 1915. In 1926 the name was changed to the Denver Area Council, and in 2022 the name was changed again to The Greater Colorado Council

The Colorado Springs Council was founded in 1916, and in 1922 changed its name to the El Paso and Teller Counties Council. That council in 1925 changed its name to Pikes Peak Council, which it remains to this day. Pikes Peak Council is home to the oldest continually-chartered troop in the state of Colorado, Troop 2, originally chartered to Colorado Springs' First Presbyterian Church in October 1917.

The Greeley Council was founded in 1916, and in 1924 changed its name to the Weld and Morgan Counties Council. That council in 1928 changed its name to Longs Peak Council, which it remains to this day. The Fort Collins Council and Longmont Council, each founded in 1917, merged in 1919 into what is now the Longs Peak Council. The Boulder Council, also created in 1917, was merged into the Council in 1920. The Southeastern Wyoming Council of Cheyenne merged into Longs Peak Council in 1928.

The Trinidad-Las Animas County Council, founded in 1917, changed its name to the Las Animas County Council in 1924. This and the Arkansas Valley Council, founded in 1924, merged in 1927 to become the Spanish Peaks Council. The Pueblo Council was founded in 1920, and in 1928 changed its name to the Rocky Mountain Council, which it remains to this day. The Spanish Peaks Council merged into Rocky Mountain Council in 1932.

The Western Colorado Council was founded in 1942, and is one of the very few councils that did not undergo a name change or merger in its entire history until 2019. May 1, 2019 Western Area Council merged into the Denver Area Council. The new area council will now serve 24 counties, which includes more than 34,000 youth. The former council area is now the Majestic Mesas District of the Denver Area Council.

During World War II, Japanese Americans interned at the Granada War Relocation Center set up a separate Amache District for Scouts at the camp, after the camp's unofficial name Camp Amache.

== Recent history (1950–2022) ==
The CSP for the historic Denver Area Council

The CSP for the historic Pikes Peak Council

In 1952, a Capital Fund Campaign was held to raise money for a new camp, Tomahawk Ranch.

In 1960 Pikes Peak Council served as host to the 1960 National Scout Jamboree, held north of Colorado Springs adjacent to the United States Air Force Academy, in celebration of the 50th anniversary of the founding of the Boy Scouts of America.

- In 1927, the Arkansas Valley Council (#669) (founded in 1924), merged with Las Animas County Council (#064) (formed in 1924) to form the Spanish Peaks Council (#064).
- The Boulder Council was formed in 1917.
- The Colorado Springs Council was formed in 1916. The El Paso & Teller Counties Council (#060) was formed in 1922. In 1925 the two councils merged to become the Pikes Peak Council (#060)
- The Denver Council was formed in 1915, and changed its name in 1926 to the Denver Area Council (#061).
- The Fort Collins Council was established in 1917.
- The Greeley Council (#062) was established in 1916. It became the Weld & Morgan Counties Council in 1924.
- The Longmont Council was formed in 1917.
- The Longs Peak Council (#062) formed in 1925 from the merger of Longs Peak Council (#689), Weld & Morgan Counties and Southeastern Wyoming Council (#639).
- The Pueblo Council (#063) was formed in 1920 and became the Rocky Mountain Council (#063) in 1928.
- The Trinidad-Las Animas County Council was formed in 1917.
- The Western Colorado Council was merged in the Greater Colorado Council.
- The Denver Area Council (#061) was renamed to the Greater Colorado Council and the council patch was changed in 2022.
- The Pikes Peak Council (#060) became the Pathway to the Rockies Council (#060) in 2022.

== Scouting in Colorado today ==
There are five Scouting America local councils and a single Girl Scouts of the USA council in Colorado, merged from an original five.

The first National Wider Opportunity for Senior Girl Scouts, "Recall the Riches restore the Ruins," was held in Central City in 1973. In 1979, "Sky Hi Ski," a National Wider Opportunity, was held at YMCA Snow Mountain Ranch near Granby and a Senior Girl Scout troop from Mile Hi Council participates in the opening ceremonies at the Winter Olympics at Lake Placid.

As of October 1, 2007, all Girl Scouts from the state are joined as Girl Scouts of Colorado Council.

=== Greater Colorado Council ===
Greater Colorado Council (#061)
- Headquarters: Denver, Colorado
- Country: United States
- Founded: 1915
- Membership: 33,409 youth ending December 2016
- President: Mathew Stava
- Council Commissioner: Dave Carlson
- Scout Executive/CEO: Charles W Brasfeild III
- Website www.denverboyscouts.org

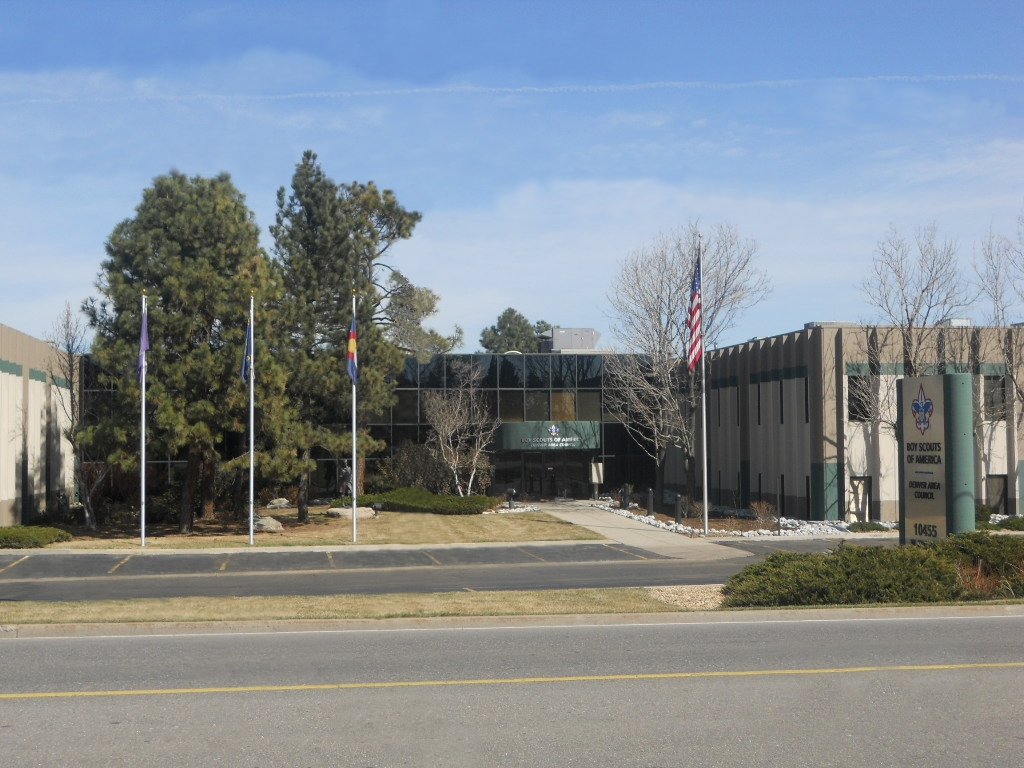
Headquarters of the Denver Area Council

The Greater Colorado Council, previously named Denver Area Council, of Scouting America is headquartered in Lakewood, Colorado, and supports Scouting units and youth in an area of central Colorado from Arapahoe and Adams Counties east to the Continental Divide.

==== Organization ====
For traditional units, the council is split into districts related by school districts. These districts are:

- Alpine - Serving SCHOOL DISTRICTS Jefferson County, Gilpin County, Clear Creek County, and Platte Canyon School District
- Black Feather — Serving SCHOOL DISTRICTS Douglas County, Littleton, Sheridan, Englewood, and Elbert County
- Centennial — Serving SCHOOL DISTRICTS Aurora Public School, Bennett School District, Byers School District, Cherry Creek School District, Deer Trail School District, and the Strasburg
- Frontier — Serving SCHOOL DISTRICTS Denver Public Schools
- Majestic Mesas - Serving SCHOOL DISTRICTS Delta County School District, Dolores County School District, Gunnison Watershed School District, Hinsdale County School District, Mesa County Valley School District, Montrose County School District, Norwood Public Schools, Ouray School District, Ridgway School District, Telluride School District, and the West End School District
- Three Rivers - Serving SCHOOL DISTRICTS Aspen School District 1, DeBeque, Eagle County, East Grand, Garfield County School District 16 (Grand Valley School District 16), Garfield School District RE-2, Hayden, Lake County, Meeker, Moffat County, Park County, Plateau Valley, Rangely, Roaring Fork, South Routt, Steamboat Springs, and the Summit
- Valley — Serving SCHOOL DISTRICTS Brighton, Adams 12 and Adams 14, Mapleton, Westminster 50, and the Boulder Valley
- The new Majestic Mesas and Three Rivers district encompasses the former Western Colorado Council.

The council, also, has non-geographic districts to support non-traditional programs operated by the council. These districts are:

- Venturing — Serving all young men and women ages 14–20
- LeAP (Leadership Assistance Program);— In-school traditional Scouting in Denver County and our Soccer in Scouting program
- Learning for Life — Serving youth in Denver
- Special Needs — Serving youth with disabilities throughout the Metropolitan Area
- Exploring — Serving ages 14–21 in career exploration in the Denver Metropolitan Area

==== Programs and activities ====
National Youth Leadership Training (NYLT) is a week-long youth oriented leadership training experience held for three weeks during the summer. This camps aims to shape youth scouts into full trained scouts and was previously named Bighorn, now it is called NYLT at Bighorn, symbolizing the area that it takes place in.

==== Camps ====
The Denver Area Council operates camps in two locations in Colorado. The primary camp, Peaceful Valley Scout Ranch, is located in Elbert, Colorado. The second, smaller camp, is Camp Tahosa, located near Nederland, Colorado.

===== Tahosa High Adventure Base =====
Camp Tahosa (TH) is a camp near Ward, Colorado, serving the Denver Area Council of Scouting America. It was the primary camp for the Denver area until the later 1970s, when it was shut down because of damage caused by environmental factors, where It was replaced by Peaceful Valley Scout Ranch. The camp now serves as a high adventure base. The High Adventure Treks from Camp Tahosa lead Scouts into the adjacent forest.

Tahosa is home to separate camping programs for both Summer and non summer usage: From September to Early May, TH offers OKPIK, Tahosa Challenge (COPE), and weekend camping. During the summer months, TH offers a variety of programs including National Youth Leadership Training, Mountain Men (provisional camping), Alpine Adventure, Tahosa Trek, and EaglePoint.

Alpine Adventure is a six night mountaineering adventure in the high country of Colorado, combining the training facilities of Tahosa High Adventure Base with the lakes and vistas of the Indian Peaks Wilderness Area. The Scout will be members of a 12-person team, learning and applying skills to conquer the strenuous challenges of the program in a dynamic mountain environment.

Tahosa Trek was started in 1995 to provide a basic knowledge of backpacking/low impact camping, the program now offers more advanced training and longer, customized treks for the units of Scouting America.

Okpik is a weekend extreme winter camping experience design to train Scouts in winter survival. The program starts with a classroom session on Friday night to prepare the scouts. On Saturday, the scouts will load equipment and supplies into sleds before snowshoeing around Tumblesome Lake. On the far shore of the lake, participants use the remainder of the day to construct quinzhees which they spend the night in.

Tahosa Challenge is part of the Project COPE program that encourages youth and adults to expand mental creativity, increase physical abilities, promote leadership skills and instill personal confidence.

EaglePoint is the newest addition to Tahosa. Founded in 2000 at Peaceful Valley Scout Ranch, EaglePoint is a troop run camp with access to the Tahosa High Adventure Base facilities. With a small staff, troops can build their own schedule and do whatever they would like for their week at camp. This program had a predecessor that started as early as 1991 called Eagle Quest.

===== Peaceful Valley Scout Ranch =====
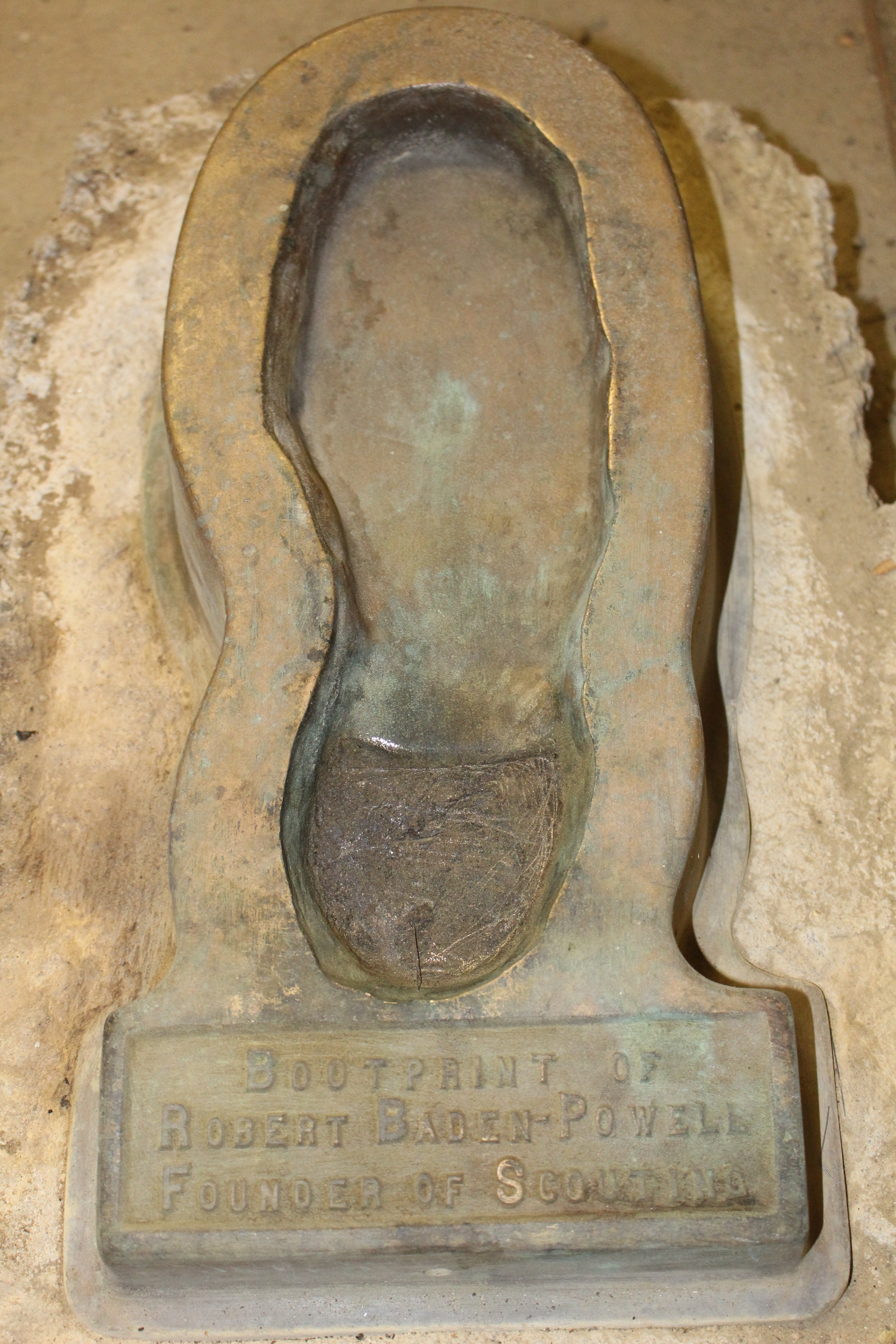
BP Boot Print - Peaceful Valley

Peaceful Valley Scout Ranch (PV) is the main camping location of the Greater Colorado Council of Scouting America. The camp, built in the 1960s by the Army Corps of Engineers, was a replacement to the original camp, Camp Tahosa. The camp is located just outside Elbert, Colorado.

Peaceful Valley Scout Ranch is home to three separate camps: Camp Cris Dobbins; Camp Cortlandt Dietler; and Magness Adventure Camp. Like Tahosa, Peaceful Valley also hosted a troop-run camp also called EaglePoint; however, as of 2009, EaglePoint is defunct (the EaglePoint program at Tahosa is still active, though). Additionally, in 2005, Scouting America Denver Area Council acquired a large section of land adjacent to Peaceful Valley, and is the location of their Magness Adventure Camp for Cub Scouts.

Facilities include the Travis Shooting Sports Facility, which contains an Olympic shotgun shooting range, the Gates Aquatic Center, a horse corral, BB Gun range, two lakes, and the three above mentioned camps. The camp also has a bronze boot print casts of Robert Baden Powell located near the main camp office.

Camp Cris Dobbins is the flagship camp of Peaceful Valley. The camp is home to The Travis Shooting Facility, which includes an Olympic shotgun range, the million dollar Gates Aquatic Center, a dining hall which underwent a nearly twelve million dollar renovation and expansion in 2019, and over twenty campsites. The camp, with a capacity of around 700 campers, offers dozens of merit badges and programs for scouts of all ages.

Camp Dietler, founded in 1988 by William Eck, is a patrol style summer camp experience. While merit badges are offered, the main focus is on the patrol method. This is carried out through patrol cooking, events determined by the patrol leader's council, and a choice of two high adventure outposts. The camp is named for Cortlandt Dietler, who donated the money to build the camp commissary.

Magness Adventure Camp is the Denver Area Council's Cub Scout camp. The camp has three shelters, each with a campsite housing eighty tents. The program includes lake activities, a BB Gun range, an archery range, recently added a slingshot paint ball range and a firewatch tower that overlooks Elbert County. The camp is also available for rental by outside groups, and is often frequented by groups such as Denver's High School ROTC and girls groups from the Church of Jesus Christ of Latter-day Saints.

==== Tahosa Lodge ====
Tahosa Lodge #383, chartered in 1948, serves 1218 Arrowmen as of 2004. It is the largest lodge in Colorado. The lodge totem is a coney (Pika), and the name translates to "Dwellers on the Mountain Tops" in the Kiowa language. The lodge is divided into seven chapters which correspond with the seven districts of the Denver Area Council. Tahosa Lodge holds their ordeal weekends and other events at the two council camps, Peaceful Valley Scout Ranch and Tahosa Scout Camp. Many patches from the lodge feature a character known as the Purple Bishop, and delegates of the lodge to NOAC can often be seen wearing purple cloaks. The Purple Bishop is a legend from Camp Tahosa.

=== Great Southwest Council ===
The Great Southwest Council serves the Durango and Mesa Verde areas of Colorado, and includes Cascade Boy Scout Camp on the National Register of Historic Places.

=== Adventure West Council ===
Adventure West Council
- Headquarters: Greeley, Colorado
- Country: United States
- Membership: 4,809 youth in 2021
- President: Dusty Porter
- Council Commissioner: Lou Leopold
- Scout Executive/CEO: Nathan Dutson
- Website awbsa.org

Adventure West Council of Scouting America is headquartered in Greeley, Colorado. Composed of the former Longs Peak Council (named after the tallest peak in the council territory) and the former Greater Wyoming Council, the Adventure West Council supports Scouting youth in northeastern Colorado north of Denver, central and eastern Wyoming and the panhandle of western Nebraska. The WyoBraska Council of Scottsbluff merged into the Longs Peak Council in 1975, and Longs Peak Council merged with the Greater Wyoming Council to form the Adventure West Council in 2021.

==== Organization ====
The council's territory is divided into seven geographic districts: Adventure West Council - Districts Map

- Bighorn District
- Frontier District
- Golden Plains District
- Shoshone District
- Thunder Basin District
- Tri-Trails District
- Wapiti District

==== Ben Delatour Scout Ranch ====
Ben Delatour Scout Ranch
- Owner: Adventure West Council
- Location: Red Feather Lakes, Colorado
- Country: United States
- Website campreservation.com/062/Camps

Encompassing 3,200 acres (13 km^{2}) at 7,200 feet (2,200 m) to 8,000 feet (2,400 m) in elevation, Ben Delatour Scout Ranch near Red Feather Lakes, Colorado is operated by the Adventure West Council and includes four Scout Camps:

- Jack Nicol Cub Scout Camp
- Camp Charles Jeffrey (Scouts BSA Camp)
- Soaring Eagle (Scouts BSA Camp)
- Elkhorn High Adventure Base

Camp Charles Jeffrey and Soaring Eagle features several summer program areas including Rock Climbing at the Pancake Climbing Base and on some of the many peaks in the camp, C.O.P.E. (Challenging Outdoor Personal Experience), Shooting Sports, Scout Skills, Handicraft, and Nature Studies offered through a traditional Merit Badge program. The camp also has a Scouting Museum and Chuck Wagon Cooking area where traditional dutch oven meals are prepared daily. Scout units can choose between a dining hall experience or a patrol cook option where meals are cooked at your campsite.

Elkhorn High Adventure Base is open to older scouts and Venture Crews for a week of backpacking the Rockies. Backpacking treks of various difficulty levels are offered on the ranch property and in the nearby Routt, Roosevelt, and Arapahoe National Forests. Shooting sports, C.O.P.E, climbing and repelling, a horse program, and white water rafting activities round out week-long treks or 10-day-long super-treks.

Jack Nicol Cub Scout Camp is the newest resident camp on the ranch, completed in 2001. It offers age-appropriate programs that are not necessarily designed for rank advancement. Camp Nicol consists of 3 major themed program areas (Fort Unfug, Castle Walker, and the Everett Seaport) and offers a summer program featuring a new camp-wide theme each year. The 2014 theme is Time Travel. Program activities include BB gun and archery shooting, hiking, handicrafts, hiking, games and a 'light parade' around the lake at night.

Ben Delatour Scout Ranch includes summer camp and year-round camping, with several buildings available for year-round use. The ranch has been an active site for sustainable forestry and in 2011, the ranch became protected from future development through a conservation easement with The Conservation Fund, the Longs Peak Council, and the Colorado State Forest Service.

==== Chimney Park Scout Camp ====
Chimney Park Boy Scout Camp is located in the Snowy Range Mountains, approximately 33 miles (53 km) west of Laramie, Wyoming on US Highway 230 and about 6.4 miles (10.3 km) west of Woods Landing, Wyoming. The approximate coordinates for the Baldwin Lodge are 41° 4' 19.78" N 106° 6' 29.2" W (NAD83/WGS84).

Chimney Park Boy Scout Camp offers year-round camping, especially winter camps, at an altitude of about 9,000 feet (2,700 m). The winter snow depth varies typically from 30 to 150 cm (1 to five feet), and the winter daytime high temperatures vary typically from -9 to +7 °C (+15 to +45 °F) The winter nighttime low temperatures vary typically from -26 to 0 °C (-15 to +32 °F). A lodge with a stove and fireplace are available. Lodge use must be reserved through the Longs Peak Council Office. There is a usage fee. See https://campreservation.com/062/Camps/909 for more information.

==== Camp Laramie Peak ====
Camp Laramie Peak, at the base of Black Mountain near Wheatland, Wyoming, offers summer camp and year-round camping. It was purchased in 1920 by a group of volunteers wanting a place to take Scouts in the wilderness. The rugged terrain, rambling brooks, and mountain backdrop offer Troops a place to experience the traditional camp experience including the merit badge camp program. The camp also offers a first-year camper program, horseback riding, rock climbing, ziplines, mountain boarding, and mountain biking.

Hiking is available in the camp and in the nearby Medicine Bow National Forest, including to the top of Laramie Peak. The elevation at the Camp is approximately 8,000 feet (2,400 m), and summer temperatures range from the 40s at night to the 90s during the day.

==== Camp Patiya ====
Camp Patiya is a 30-acre camping and day-use camp about seven miles west of Boulder, Colorado. Camp Patiya was started by the Camp Fire Girls. The Camp Fire Council purchased the original twenty acres for the camp in 1960 and began holding group and family camps shortly thereafter. All the buildings on site were constructed between 1963 and 1981. In 1977, an additional ten acres of land was donated, bringing the camp to its present size. Camp Fire continued to hold group camping year-round and Day Camps in the summers. In the 1980s, membership in Camp Fire declined. In 1987, it was determined that the goals for operating the camp could best be met by transferring the ownership to Adventure West Council.

==== Kola Lodge ====
Kola Lodge #464, chartered in 1951, serves over 100 Arrowmen as of 2022. The totem of this Lodge is the Fire of Friendship centered in a gray arrowhead with a red feather and an antelope antler in the background, and the name translates to "Friend" in the Lakota language. In 1973, Kola Lodge absorbed Wiyaka Luta #403 of the Wyo-Braska Council. In 2021 Kola Lodge absorbed Tatokainyanka Lodge #359 of Greater Wyoming Council.

=== Pathway to the Rockies Council ===
Pathway to the Rockies Council (#060)
- Headquarters: Colorado Springs, Colorado
- Country: United States
- President: Karl Falk
- Council Commissioner: Eric Brenkert
- Scout Executive: James Machamer
- Website www.pikespeakbsa.org

The Pathway to the Rockies Council, formerly known as the Pikes Peak Council, of the Scouting America, headquartered in Colorado Springs, Colorado. Named after the most famous peak in the council territory, upon which 'America the Beautiful' was written, Pathway to the Rockies Council provides Scouting to youth in east-central Colorado, including Park, Teller, El Paso, Elbert, Lincoln, Kit Carson and Cheyenne Counties.

On board the Space Shuttle Challenger when it disintegrated in 1986 was an American flag that was sponsored by Troop 514 of Monument, Colorado. When the Challenger wreckage was retrieved from the bottom of the Atlantic Ocean, this flag was found, sealed in a plastic bag, intact and completely unscathed.

==== History ====
In 1960, Colorado Springs host the 50th National Scout Jamboree. Known as the BSA Golden Jubilee, its theme was "For God and Country" and from July 22 to July 28, 1960, over 56,377 scouts and scouters were in attendance. Today, remnants of the 50th Jamboree can be found throughout Colorado Springs.

The council has an international relationship with Scouts in Kyrgyzstan.

In July 2005, Pathway to the Rockies Council moved from its four-decade home downtown to a temporary location in northeast Colorado Springs until the council's new headquarters at the intersection of I-25 and Fillmore Street was finished in July 2008, to account for the demographic and geographic shift of Colorado Springs. The vacated original building became the home of Sario, a Lions Club project.

Scout executives

- Ray Ryerson 1940–1973
- Loren Swenson 1973–1993
- James Winkler 1993–1995
- Ross Harrop 1995–2004
- Ian Lilien 2004–2008
- Dustin Shaver 2008–2012
- Kent Downing 2012–2016
- Jim Machamer 2017–present

==== Organization ====
Districts

- Frontier District (Serves Colorado Springs School District 11 and Falcon School District 49)
- High Plains District (Serves the school districts of Peyton, Calhan, Ramah, Ellicott, Miami-Yoder, Edison, Hanover, and all communities in Elbert, Lincoln, Kit Carson, and Kiowa Counties, pointing east to the Kansas border including the communities of Limon, Burlington and Cheyenne Wells)
- Ute District (Serves Harrison School District 2, Cheyenne Mountain School District 12, Fountain-Fort Carson School District 8 and Widefield School District 3)
- Jamboree District (Serves Academy School District 20 and Lewis-Palmer School District 38)
- ScoutReach District (Serves Colorado Springs School District 11 and Harrison School District 2)

==== Camps ====
===== Camp Alexander =====
Camp Alexander
- Owner: Pikes Peak Council
- Headquarters: Colorado Springs, Colorado
- Country: United States
- Founder: [J. Don Alexander]
- Website www.pikespeakbsa.org/Camping/SummerCamp

The council camp, Camp Alexander, is located in the Eleven Mile Canyon in the Pike National Forest approximately 45 miles (72 km) west of Colorado Springs, and two miles (3 km) south of Lake George, in Park County, was donated in 1946 by J. Don Alexander of the Alexander Film Company. There are a series of Burma Shave-style signs on the main road into camp, each sign having one of the points of the Scout Law. Camp Alexander is between 8200 and 8,600 feet (2,600 m) elevation. The camp area consists of hills, low mountains, and valleys covered by a mix of Ponderosa pine forests, high-altitude grasslands, and wetland vegetation along the lake and stream. In the 2012 Springer Wildfire, the camp was evacuated, and parts of the camp were used by firefighters as staging and defensible spaces.

===== Glen Aspen Scout Ranch =====
Glen Aspen Scout Ranch
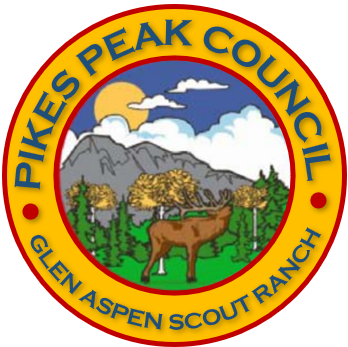
- Owner: Pikes Peak Council
- Headquarters: Colorado Springs, Colorado
- Location: Woodland Park, Colorado
- Country: United States
- Founder: Leonard Johnson Estate
- Website www.pikespeakbsa.org/Camping/SummerCamp

In 2008, the Pathway to the Rockies Council acquired a beautiful parcel of land containing 200 acres just outside of Woodland Park in a gift from the estate of Leonard Johnson Jr. The property is surrounded on most sides by the Pike National Forest. The property is hilly with several streams running through the property. The land is covered with varieties of foliage including pine, cedar, and of course Aspen. Wildlife is abundant and includes a herd of Elk, deer, bear, red-tailed hawks, eagles, foxes, coyotes, rabbits, squirrels, and much more.

==== Order of the Arrow ====
Ha-Kin-Skay-A-Ki Lodge #387, chartered in 1948, serves 743 Arrowmen as of 2004. The lodge totem is a Rocky Mountain bighorn sheep, and the name is said to translate to "Great Horned Goat of the Mountain" but does not specify the language or dialect. Until 1953, the lodge was simply known as Pike's Peak Lodge.

In response to the 2012 Waldo Canyon Fire that affected Colorado Springs, the lodge released a fundraising lodge flap featuring a bighorn sheep looking over a burning area.

=== Western Colorado Council ===
Western Colorado Council (#064)
- Headquarters: Grand Junction, Colorado
- Country: United States

The Western Colorado Council of the Scouting America was founded in 1942. In May 2019 the council merged with the Denver Area Council.

- Grand Mesa District serves Mesa County, and also hosts the council office
- Majestic Mountain District serves Hinsdale, Gunnison, Ouray, San Miguel, Montrose and Delta counties, a geographic area approximately the same size as the state of Connecticut
- Three Rivers District serves Garfield, Eagle, Summit, Pitkin, Moffat, Routt, Grand, and Rio Blanco counties

==== Mic-O-Say Lodge ====
Mic-O-Say Lodge #541, chartered in 1959, serves 168 Arrowmen as of 2004. The lodge totem is an eagle. Prior to 1960 there was not an Order of the Arrow Lodge (OA) serving Western Colorado Council (WC-C). The Council honor camping organization had previously been the Tribe of Mic-O-Say (MOS) (also existing in some Councils in Kansas and Missouri) which had been founded by H. Roe Bartle. However, with the arrival of a new WC-C Scout Executive, a decision was made to discontinue MOS and replace it with an OA lodge which was officially recognized by the BSA. As a compromise, the lodge was allowed to retain the name "Mic-O-Say" and to continue some of the MOS insignia and traditions. The traditional MOS Eagle Claws were permitted to be worn by youth and adult members suspended from a French braid spiral lanyard in the tribal official red, white and blue craftstrip colors.

==== Summer camps ====
===== Steve Fossett Spirit of Adventure Ranch =====
The Steve Fossett Spirit of Adventure Ranch (SOAR) was launched in Summer 2014. The camp was located in the Colorado Rockies near the eastern entrance of Glenwood Canyon, 8 miles off of I-70 from the Dotsero exit. The camp closed after the 2018 summer season, when it served as an alternate high adventure base for scouts unable to attend Philmont due to summer fires. The council merger did not include plans to renew the lease for the camp.

===== Spanish Peaks Scout Ranch =====
The Spanish Peaks Scout Ranch (SPSR) is located near Walsenburg, Colorado and borders the Spanish Peaks Wilderness. It is a local council camp of the Santa Fe Trail Council based out of Garden City, Kansas. The camp gives program geared toward outdoor education such as wilderness backpacking, climbing, and outdoor skills. In 2013, the camp was partially destroyed by a wildfire which destroyed over 13,500 acres. The camp has since been rebuilt and has re-opened for operation.

== Girl Scouting in Colorado ==
Girl Scouting in Colorado
- Girl Scouts of Colorado Map
- Country: United States

=== History ===
In 1955, $600 was raised to help restore Juliette Low's birthplace. In 1959, the Girl Scouts of Metro Denver council name changed to Girl Scouts-Mile Hi Council, which remained the name until 2007. In 1967, troops for girls with special needs were started at Fletcher Miller School and at Fort Logan.

International Girl Scout gatherings named Senior Roundups were held every three years from 1956 until 1965. The National Girl Scouts of the USA Roundup was held from July 3 to July 12, 1959, adjacent to the site of the then-new United States Air Force Academy north of Colorado Springs, attended by 10,000 girls.

==== Oldest living GSUSA Girl Scout ====
The oldest living Girl Scout was Marianne Elser Crowder, born in Colorado Springs in April 1906. She joined the Wagon Wheel Council Troop 4 in 1918 and was awarded her Golden Eaglet, which was then the GSUSA highest award. She later operated her own dance studio in Colorado Springs and headed the dance department at Colorado College before moving to Menlo Park, California in 1939. The Wagon Wheel Council named Crowder the nation's oldest Girl Scout after it conducted a nationwide search and sifted through council archives.

=== Girl Scouts of Colorado ===
Girl Scouts of Colorado
- Owner: Girl Scouts of the USA
- Headquarters: Denver, Colorado
- Country: United States
- Website www.girlscoutsofcolorado.org

The Girl Scouts of Colorado was formed in 2007 by a realignment of the five councils that had been serving the state, and the incorporation of nine counties that were previously served by councils in border states. The five previous Colorado councils were Mile Hi (Denver), Wagon Wheel (Colorado Springs), Columbine (Pueblo), Mountain Prairie (Fort Collins), Chipeta (Grand Junction); and the eight Colorado counties previously served by councils in other states were Archuleta, Dolores, Jackson, La Plata, Las Animas, Montezuma, Prowers and San Juan. The council serves 40,500 girl members and 11,000 adult volunteers.

Girl Scouts of Colorado has service center locations in Colorado Springs, Denver, Durango, Fort Collins, Grand Junction and Pueblo. There are also staff members who work in other areas of the state such as Bailey, Breckenridge, Estes Park, Crowley, Greeley, Johnstown, Longmont, Merino, Monte Vista, Parachute, Sterling, Trinidad, Red Feather Lakes, Sanford, Steamboat Springs and Woodland Park. Additionally, Girl Scouts of Colorado has divided the state into eight regions.

The council maintains three resident camp properties:

- Magic Sky Ranch, near Red Feather Lakes, Larimer County is 750 acres (3.0 km^{2})
- Sky High Ranch, Woodland Park, Teller County established in 1952 has 880 acres (3.6 km^{2})
- Tomahawk Ranch, near Bailey, Park County is 480 acres (1.9 km^{2})

And some regular camps:

- Meadow Mountain Ranch, near Estes Park, Boulder County is at 8,600 feet (2,600 m) above sea level.
- Kiwa Korral, near Lyons, Boulder County
- Hamp Hut, in Garden of the Gods Park, El Paso County. Built in 1953.
- Lazy Acres, near Pueblo, Pueblo County established in 1945
- Pawnee Lodge, near Sterling, Logan County
- Twisted Pine, 20 miles (32 km) west of Denver

== International Scouting units in Colorado ==
In addition, there are contingents of active Plast Ukrainian Scouts in Colorado.

== See also ==
- Koshare Indian Dancers
