= B-P's footprint =

Casting of the right foot of Lord Baden-Powell

B-P's Footprint
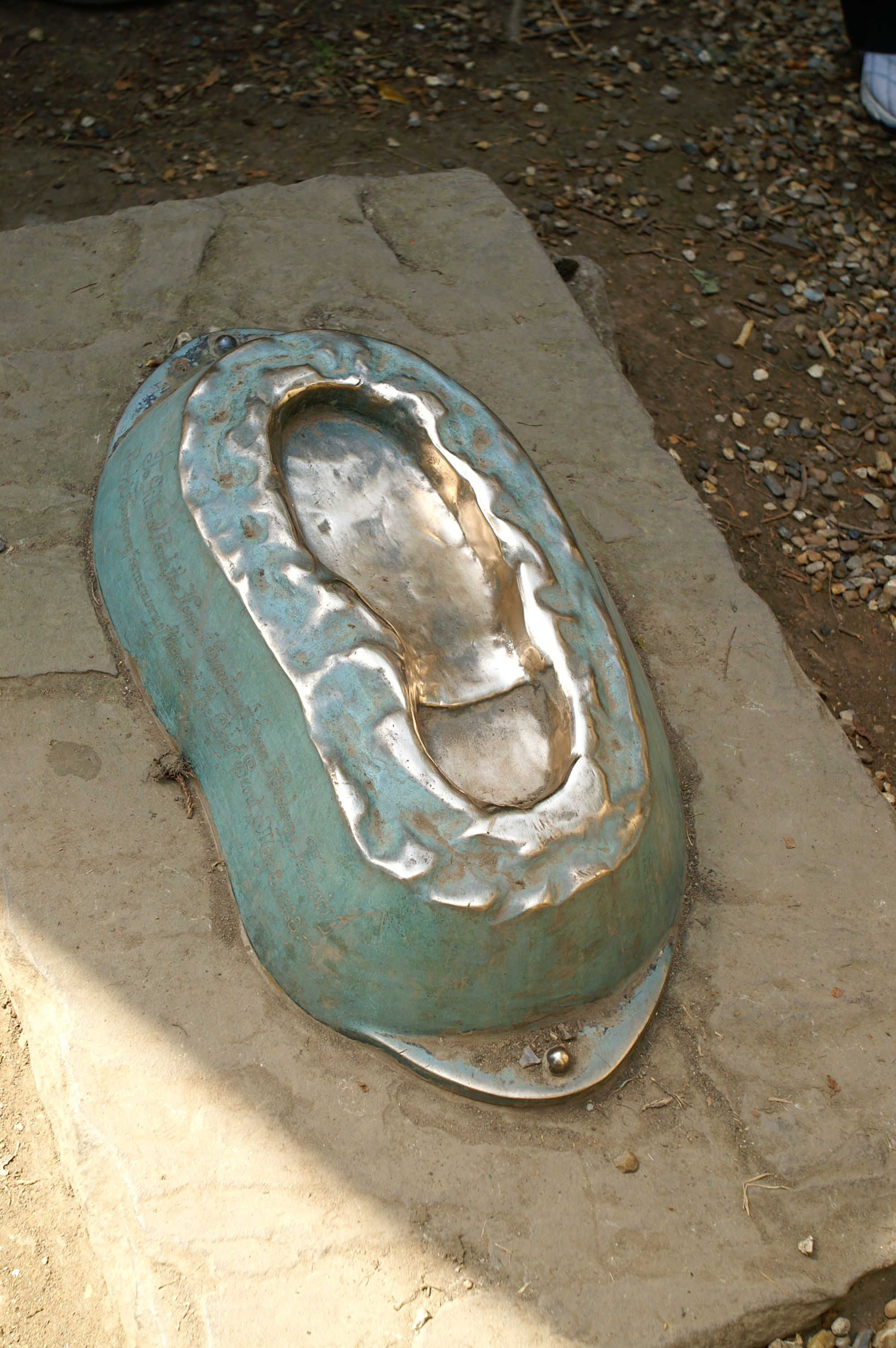
- B-P's footprint at Gilwell Park
- Location: multiple

B-P's footprint is a casting, usually in bronze or brass, of the right foot of Lord Baden-Powell, the founder of the Scout Movement (and whose sister founded the Guides movement), who is known as "B.-P." The idea is that people may put their foot into this casting, so that they can say that they have "walked in the footsteps of B-P."

== History ==
The 1928 Scouting World Conference was officially opened on 4 May in Parád, Hungary. The next day, the delegates went on an excursion to Lake Balaton and other places returning to Budapest in the afternoon. That evening, Baden-Powell, his wife Olave and Lord Hampton arrived.

On 6 May, there was a rally at the playing field of Ferencvárosi TC attended by 9,647 out of the 25,000 Scouts then in Hungary and up to 20,000 of the public. On 7 May B.-P. came to the Hárshegy Training Park. B.-P. wrote, about the rally at Hárshegy:

This took place in pouring rain... An unusual incident marked the occasion of my visit when they invited me to make my footprint in the soil. A cast of this was taken and imprinted permanently on the spot in concrete.

From this cast two bronze copies were made, one was for the Hárshegy Training Park and the other was a gift to Baden-Powell, which he passed to the British Scout Headquarters.

In November 1928, after a request for the World Chief Scout to provide another copy of his footprint was made by the Queensland Scouters in Australia, B.-P. replied:

Talking of tracking, when I was in Hungary the novel idea occurred to the scout authorities there of taking an impress of my foot in concrete, as proving that I had been there. In consequence of this, I have been invited by an Australian scout training centre to send them my footprint; but for one thing, my foot is not specially a thing of beauty to set up as an ornament, nor did I quite like to send it to a spot which my foot has not, as yet, trodden. Otherwise, I should have been proud to have my visit recorded as indubitably as a criminal's thumb-print shows him to have been the guest of his Majesty—in gaol. So when next I go to Australia I shall take with me the most characterful pair of shoes that I can find.

On his Australian and New Zealand visit, on Thursday, 26 March 1931, B.-P. dutifully made an imprint of his right shoe into concrete.

In 1933, during the 4th World Scout Jamboree in Gödöllő, Hungary the British Contingent get a copy from the Hungarian Honorary Chief Scout, count Pál Teleki. One of them passed to the B-P House, London, and the other passed to the Gilwell Park. When the communists took over and banned Scouting in 1948, the training ground was confiscated and houses were built on the land; neither the original concrete footprint, nor the "Hungarian original bronze" has been seen since.

The text is the next on the bronze statue: at right side: 'The Footprint in the Sands of Time', at the left side: 'To Gilwell Park the home of Scoutcraft from Hárshegy Training Park /Hungary/ in memory of the visit of the Chief Scout'.

== Norway ==
The Norwegian Boy Scout Organization received a copy of the B.-P. Footprint as a gift from Gilwell Park by Camp Chief John Thurman in the summer of 1959. A Kudu horn was presented at the same time. The footprint then was mounted in front of the house at the Norwegian Gilwell Training Ground on the farm "Sverveli" in Telemark, Norway..

There it stayed for 41 years, until June 2010, when Sverveli was sold. The Norwegian B.-P. Footprint then was removed and is at present a part of the equipment used at the annual Norwegian Trefoil-Gilwell (Wood Badge) training courses.. In June 2012, a casting in brass was made from the Norwegian footprint at the Østlandske Lettmetall foundry in Elverum, Norway. It is used during the Trefoil-Gilwell courses as a symbol of the Baden-Powell spirit, along with a 6-bead woodbadge suspended from a tripod..

== United Kingdom ==
=== Gilwell Park ===
Before World War II a copy of the "British original bronze" was cast and placed at Gilwell Park, the original remained at Scout Headquarters in London. Gilwell was requisitioned by the War Ministry from 1940 to 1945 as a local command, training, and ordnance centre. During this time the footprint was left undisturbed.

In 1991 four Members of the Hungarian Scout Headquarters team visited England, and saw the Baden-Powell footprint at Gilwell. At their request, a plastic mould was taken of the first "British original bronze", by this time at Baden-Powell House, and from this the Hungarians cast a new footprint, which was installed in their new Scout Training Park, given them in 1991 by the Hungarian Government.

=== Brownsea Island ===
On Friday 3 August 2012, there was a dinner to close the 67th Norwegian Trefoil-Gilwell Training course held on the island. A copy of the B.-P. footprint was presented by staff member Øystein Gonsholt to Brownsea Island, represented by the warden for that weekend, Claire, as a symbol of the deep-felt gratitude felt by the course attenders and staff, but also on behalf of former, present and future Scouts and Guides of Norway as a tribute to B.-P., his Scouting idea and Brownsea Island – the cradle of Scouting.

In 1963 the National Trust (the owner of Brownsea Island) opened the Island to the public, in a ceremony conducted by Olave Lady Baden-Powell, the World Chief Guide. On 13 May 2013, as part of the celebrations to mark the 50th anniversary of the opening, the Brownsea Island footprint was installed beside an existing bust of Lord Baden-Powell and unveiled by one of B.-P.'s grandchildren, Gill Clay, daughter of the B.-P.'s daughter Betty Clay. It is the donors' highest wish that their gift will benefit Brownsea Island and give joy and good B.-P. spirit to visitors to Brownsea Island for many years to come.

== List of copies ==
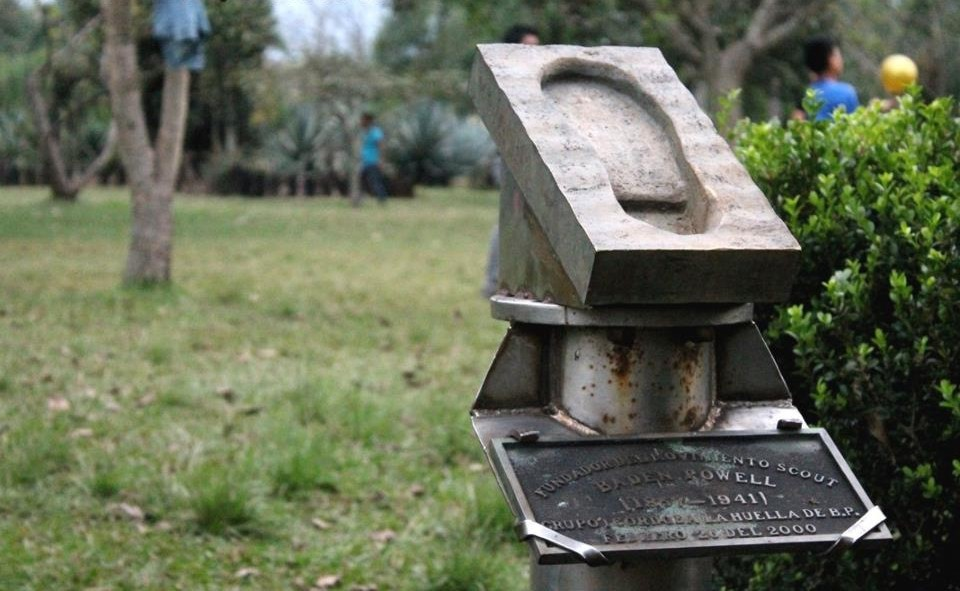
Footprint of Baden Powell: Tribute in the Paso Coyol Ecological Park of Córdoba, Veracruz, Mexico

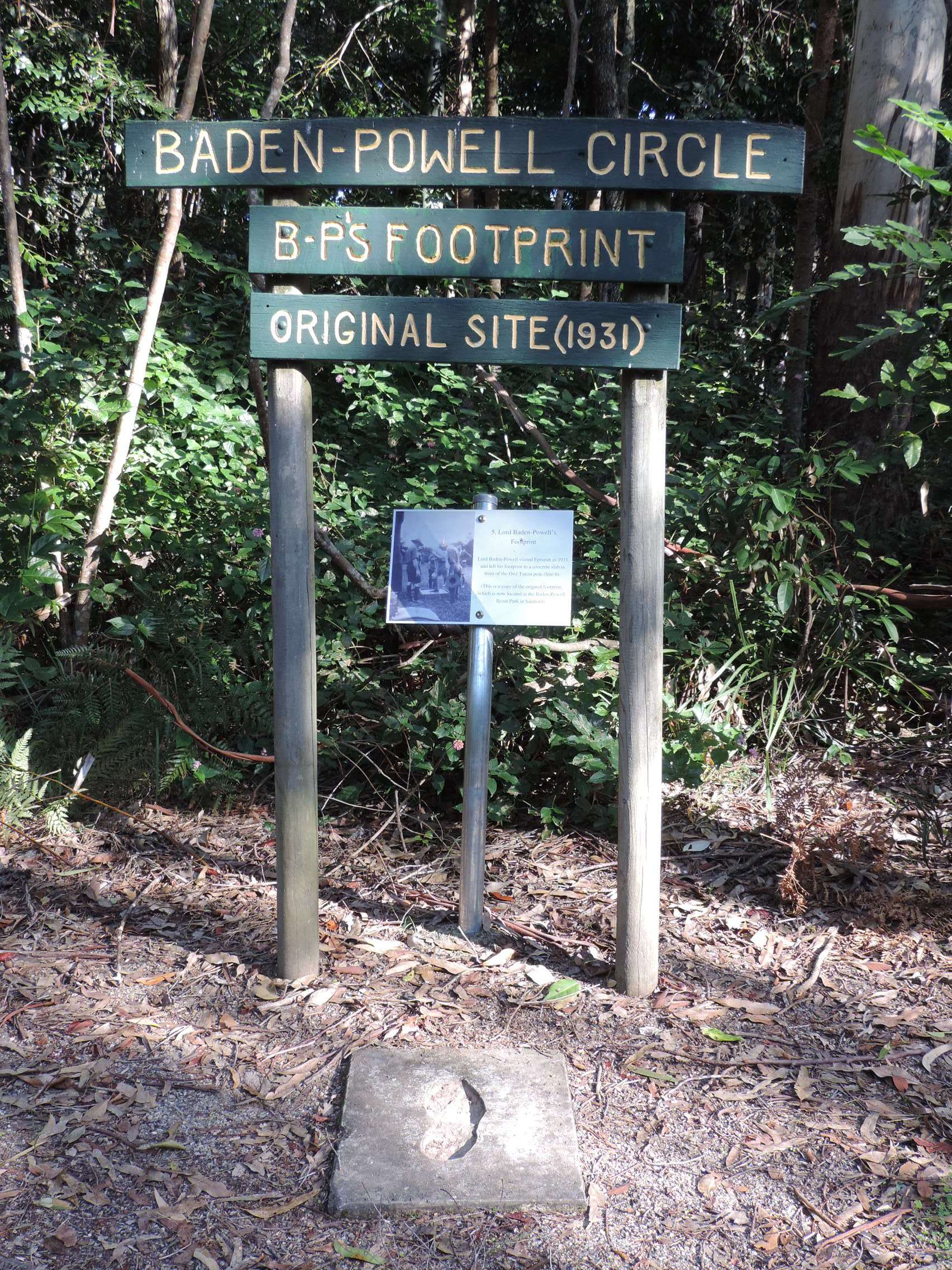
Reproduction of Baden-Powell's shoeprint from March 1931, Eprapah, Australia

Apart from those mentioned above, a number of copies exist around the world, among them:
Country	City	Location	Provenance	Notes
Australia	Victoria Point	Eprapah	Made by B.-P. on his 1931 Eprapah visit. Original is now at the Baden-Powell Scout Park (Samford, Brisbane), with a copy at Eprapah. Right foot.	
El Salvador	San Salvador	Scout Association of El Salvador headquarters	Gift of William D. Campbell, Provenance unknown	
Hungary	Budapest	Sztrilich Pál Scout Centre	Copy of the Scout Association copy	
Hungary	Budapest	Hárshegy Training Park	The original – lost in 1948 – copy of the Scout Association copy	
Kenya	Nairobi	Rowallan Scout Centre	Unknown	
Mexico	Córdoba	Paso Coyol Ecological Park	Unknown. Right foot.	
Mexico	Tepoztlán, Morelos	Meztitla Scout Camp School	Gift of John Thurman, Copy of the Scout Association footprint	
Norway	Telemark	Sverveli	Gift of John Thurman, Copy of the Scout Association footprint	In storage
United Kingdom	Poole Harbour, Dorset county	Brownsea Island	Copy of the Norwegian footprint	
United Kingdom	Chingford, London	Gilwell Park	Copy of the Scout Association footprint. Right foot.	
United Kingdom	London	Scout Association	Only copy of the Hungarian original	
United States	Elbert, Colorado	Camp Cris Dobbins	Provenance unknown	
United States	Ward, Colorado	Tahosa High Adventure Base	Provenance unknown	
United States	Miami Lakes, Florida	Thomas L. Tatham Scout Service Center	Copy of the Meztitla footprint	
Zimbabwe	Gordon Park, Matopos	Zimbabwe Scout Centenary Camp	Provenance unknown	

== See also ==
- Petrosomatoglyph
