= Eprapah Creek =

River in Queensland, Australia

Coordinates: 27°34′S 153°18′E

Eprapah Creek (longitude 153.30º East, latitude -27.567º South) is a sub-tropical stream in Redland City close to Brisbane in South East Queensland, Australia.

It rises on the north-eastern slopes of Mount Cotton and flows directly to the Moreton Bay at Victoria Point. It is 12.6 kilometres (7.8 mi) long with about 3.8 kilometres (2.4 mi) of estuarine zone. In the latter, the water depth is typically about one to two m mid-stream, the width is about 20 to 30 metres (66 to 98 ft) and the tides are semi-diurnal with a range of about 2 metres (6 ft 7 in). The catchment area of approximately 39 square kilometres (15 sq mi) is mostly urban in the lower reaches and semi rural/rural residential in the upper reaches.

The creek includes several conservation areas such as Eprapah hosting endangered species, e.g. koalas, swamp wallabies, sea eagles.

== Water quality ==
The water quality and ecology have been closely monitored at Eprapah Creek (Victoria Point, Queensland) over thirty years by Redland Shire Council, Environmental Protection Agency (EPA) and local community groups. The creek was heavily polluted in 1998 by illegal discharges of tributyl-tin (TBT) and chemical residues. Although the estuarine zone includes two environmental parks, there are some marinas and boat yards, and a major sewage plant discharge that affect the natural system. The upstream catchment has been adversely affected by large-scale poultry farms, wineries, land clearance and semi-urban development. The recent works included the constructions of new shopping centres and residential lots less than 500 metres from the estuary in 2003–04.

== Turbulent mixing in Eprapah Creek estuary ==
Between 2003 and 2007, a series of field studies were performed in the estuarine zone of Eprapah Creek that is a typical small coastal plain type. The aim of these field studies was to investigate the turbulence and turbulent mixing properties in the estuarine zone. During these studies, high frequency turbulence and physio-chemistry data were collected continuously over a relatively long duration (up to 50 h), and the findings have direct implications on the modelling of small estuaries. The studies showed that the response of the turbulence and water quality properties were distinct under spring and neap tidal forcing and behaved differently in the middle and upper estuarine zones. The behaviour of turbulence properties to spring tidal forcing differed from that observed in larger estuaries and seemed unique to small estuarine systems. An investigation of several key turbulence parameters used in the modelling of estuarine mixing showed that many assumptions used in larger estuaries must be applied with caution or are simply untrue in small estuaries. For example, the assumption that the mixing coefficient parameters are constant over the tidal cycle in a small estuary is simply untrue. These distinctions between the turbulence and mixing properties in small and large estuarine systems highlight the need for the continued study of small estuaries, so this type of system can be properly understood.

Like most small subtropical estuaries, Eprapah Creek is characterised by short-lived freshwater flushing, and basically no flow during the dry season. A recent field study highlighted the short-term impact of a rainstorm on a small subtropical estuary. The flushing appeared to be caused primarily by the rainfall runoff from the nearby shopping centres, parkings and roadways. In the estuary, the surface flows were dominated by the freshwater flushing including during the flood tide. Some strong vertical stratification of the water column was observed at all sampling locations, but the longitudinal distributions of dissolved oxygen and turbidity showed a quasi-homogeneous estuarine system, in sharp contrasts with dry weather data sets. The salinity data highlighted the advective diffusion of the freshwater plume. The observed saltwater intrusion data exhibited a dome-shaped intrusion curve, and the data followed an analytical model. The analytical solution provided a simple physical model of the salt dispersion in the alluvial estuary. It showed the significance of density-driven mixing in the upper estuary during wet weather conditions.

== See also ==
- List of rivers of Australia
