= Scouting and Guiding in Queensland =

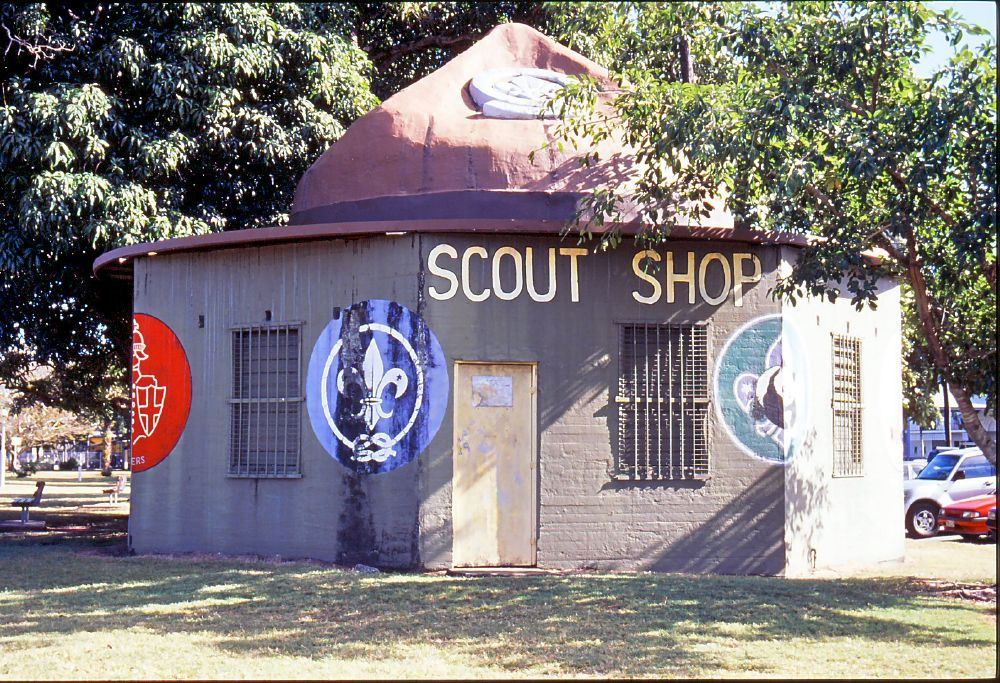
Cairns Control Room with scout hat

Scouting and Guiding in Queensland is represented by Scouts Australia, Girl Guides Australia, Plast Ukrainian Scouts, and the Australian Baden-Powell Scouts' Association.

== History ==
CHUMS Scout Patrols started forming in Australia in 1908 due to the circulation of CHUMS publication there. R. C. Packer in 1908 supported the formation of the League of Boy Scouts. St. Enoch's Presbyterian Church, Mount Morgan, Queensland formed its unit on 23 November 1908.

In 1909, the Australian League of Boy Scouts Queensland formed. Other groups could have been formed in Queensland by the Boys' Brigade Scouts, British Boy Scouts (BBS), Imperial Boy Scouts (IBS), Anglican Church Lads' Brigade's Church Scout Patrols, Girl Peace Scouts and YMCA Scouts.

In 1910 the CHUMS Scout Patrols merged with the BBS. Also in July 1910, the Australian League of Boy Scouts Queensland affiliated to the United Kingdom's Boy Scouts Association and changed names to League of Baden-Powell Boy Scouts, Queensland Section. St. Enoch's affiliated their company with the Boy's Brigade Scouts in 1910. Started in 1910, the Australian Boy Scouts had merged with the Imperial Boy Scouts to become Australian Imperial Boy Scouts (AIBS) by 1912.

The Church Scout Patrols ceased activities by 1912 while the League of Boy Scouts had stopped operating around 1914. A part of the Girl Peace Scouts joined the Voluntary Aid Detachments during World War I.

Baden-Powell's scouting organisation finally extended itself to Australia almost five years after founding, known as the 'Baden-Powell Boy Scouts' in 1914 later rename to the Boy Scout's Association. The League of Baden-Powell Boy Scouts, Queensland Section changes names again to Boy Scout's Association, Queensland Section.

The Salvation Army's Life Saving Scouts start up in 1921. Boy Scout's Association, Queensland Section merges with the rest of the BSA. The Boys' Brigade (BB) Scouts program ended in 1927 while the Catholic Boy Scouts' Association is formed the same year by the Society of St. Vincent de Paul in New South Wales and Queensland. With the end of the BB Scouts, St. Enoch's unit becomes a BSA unit.

Before 1939, the Boy Scouts’ Association in the United Kingdom sponsored juvenile immigration to Queensland.

The Boy Scout Association wanted their branches to receive monopoly status from the governments so as to control the scouting movement. The BSA sent Overseas Commissioners in the 1920s and 1930s along with Baden-Powell in 1931 and 1934 to Australia in support of this effort. In 1934, the BSA began a move to centralise control over Scout Groups by insisting on property being registered in the BSA's name instead of the local Scout Group. Also that year, the BSA's Queensland branch constitution was changed to remove State Council's elected local representatives. Scout Groups resisted but the BSA used World War II to further the centralisation.

In 1939, Saint Enoch's Church, Mount Morgan scouts became independent as the Blue Boy Scouts in response to BSA's control. During World War II, the Australian IBS disbanded. In June 1943, Sir Leslie Orme Wilson, the Governor of Queensland, resigned as The Boy Scouts Association Chief Scout of Queensland in opposition to a large portion of public donations going towards the many salaries of headquarters staff, making the Chief Commissioner a paid position and its failure to respond to his call for reforms to its centralisation efforts that led to the severance of the Mount Morgan Blue Boy Scouts' registration with the BSA. He felt it was contrary to the first principles of Scouting but would continue to support the movement. Several scouts-in-exile groups started in the 1940s for eastern European scouts, including the "Plast Ukrainian Youth Association in Brisbane, Queensland".

The Australian Boy Scouts Association was formed in 1958 and incorporated On 23 August 1967, as a branch of The Boy Scouts Association of the United Kingdom. The Queensland Branch of The Boy Scouts Association was declared a first Branch of The Australian Boy Scouts Association. In 1971 The Scout Association of Australia changed its name to The Scout Association of Australia. On 15 August 1974, The Scout Association of Australia, Queensland Branch, was incorporated by Letters Patent issued by the Queensland government under the Religious Education Charitable Institutions Act 1861–1967. Only the members of the state council were members of this body corporate. The Scout Association of Australia Queensland Branch Inc. is now incorporated under Associations Incorporation Act 1981. The Scout Association of Australia, Queensland Branch Act 1975 made provisions for the vesting of property and related purposes in the corporation styled "The Scout Association of Australia, Queensland Branch".

== Blue Boy Scouts ==
Mount Morgan Scouts
- Owner: St. Enoch's Presbyterian Church
- Headquarters: St. Enoch's Presbyterian Church
- Location: Mount Morgan, QLD
- Country: AU
- Founded: 1908
- Defunct: 1957
- Founder: Benjamin Gilmore Patterson
- Chief Scout: Benjamin Gilmore Patterson
- Affiliation: BB Scouts (1910–1927); BSA Queensland (1910–1926); BSA (1926–1939)

The 'Mount Morgan Scouts', 'Blue Boy Scouts', or '1st Mount Morgan Company', was a multiple-affiliated Boys Scout company initially affiliated with the Boys' Brigade (B.B.) that was also independent from 1939 to 1957. They received the name as the "Blue Boy Scouts" by retaining their B.B. heritage by wearing blue uniforms and using a modified Scout Promise using "Sure and Steadfast", the B.B. motto.

St. Enoch's Presbyterian Church, Mount Morgan, Queensland formed its unit on 23 November 1908, under Benjamin Gilmore Patterson. Patterson was in the militia from 1900 to 1904 in the Sydney University Scouts with Sir Leslie Orme Wilson. The unit was registered with the Boys' Brigade (BB) Scouts as the 1st Mount Morgan Company in 1910. The Company also that year affiliated itself with the Australian League of Boy Scouts Queensland. In July 1910, the Australian League of Boy Scouts Queensland affiliated with the United Kingdom's Boy Scouts Association/Baden-Powell Boy Scouts and changes names to League of Baden-Powell Boy Scouts, Queensland Section. The in effect triple affiliation existed until the merger of Queensland into the Boy Scout Association in 1926 and the dual affiliation in 1927 with end of the BB Scouts.

In 1921, Patterson received the Silver Wolf Award as Queensland's second awardee. Patterson had also served as a district commissioner of the BSA. The Commonwealth Parliament in 1924 praised him for his Mount Morgan Scouts efforts.

The Boy Scout Association moved for government monopoly status and centralised control. Also that year, the BSA's Queensland branch constitution was changed to remove State Council's elected local representatives.

Patterson resign from the BSA in 1939 over the BSA centralisation issue and took the 1st Mount Morgan Company with him. In 1942, Sir Leslie Orme Wilson, The Governor of Queensland, resigned as chief scout of Queensland Branch due to the failure of the BSA to respond to his call for reforms to its centralisation effort that led to the severance of the Blue Boy Scouts' tie to the BSA. Patterson died in 1955 and the company continued independently for another two years until 1957.

== Scouts Australia ==
Queensland
- Owner: Scouts Australia
- Headquarters: 32 Dixon Street, Auchenflower
- Country: Australia
- Founded: August 1908 (first patrols) 1909 (state organisation); July 2, 1910 (Home Headquarters, London affiliation) September 13, 1910 (constitution adopted)
- Chief Scout: Her Excellency the Honourable Dr. Jeannette Young AC PSM, Governor of Queensland
- Chief Commissioner of Queensland: Geoff Doo
- Website scoutsqld.com.au

The current chief commissioner for Scouts Queensland is Geoff Doo.

Scouting in Queensland is divided into regions:

- Brisbane North Region
- Brisbane South Region
- Central & Coastal Region
- Central Western Region
- Darling Downs Region
- Far North Region
- Gold Coast Region
- Kennedy Region
- Logan and Bay Region
- Moreton Region
- Near North Coast & Country Region
- North Western Region
- Capricorn Region
- South Eastern Region
- Suncoast Region
- Western Region
- Wide Bay-Burnett Region

The Baden-Powell Heritage Centre located at Samford and the Heritage Archival Reference Centre at Auchenflower hold heritage material on Scouting in Queensland and help Scouts with the Heritage Badge.

The Baden-Powell Guild also operates in Queensland and has many sub-branches and members.

There is a Scout Air Activities Centre at Redcliffe Aerodrome. The association has several properties across the state, including:

- Baden-Powell Park, Samford, Brisbane. The 56 hectares of natural bush land park, adjoining Brisbane Forest Park, has a museum, large camping fields, a pool, and abseiling tower. The site is also home to Kulgun, the State leader training centre; and
- Eprapah, the Charles S. Snow Scout Environment Training Centre, Victoria Point, near Brisbane. Home to koalas, there is indigenous, European, and Scouting heritage, together with a variety of ecosystems (riparian, estuarine, rainforest). The site is bounded to the north by Eprapah Creek, and forms a wildlife corridor from Mount Cotton. Its value is recognised as a declared environmental reserve by the local city council, and designated as a Scout Centre of Excellence for Nature and Environment (SCENES) site.

Web Access Made Easy was founded by Scouts Queensland to be an internet service provider in Queensland and to support the branch.

The Brisbane Gang Show is an amateur theatrical performance. It is the second longest continuously running Gang Show in the world, starting in 1952 and being performed each year since. The show is held in July each year at the Schonell Theatre, University of Queensland. It is currently one of the five oldest Gang Shows in the world.

== Girl Guides Queensland ==
The State Office is at 132 Lutwyche Road, Windsor, Queensland. Guide House, at 17 Gould Road, Herston, was damaged in the 2011 Brisbane floods.

=== History ===
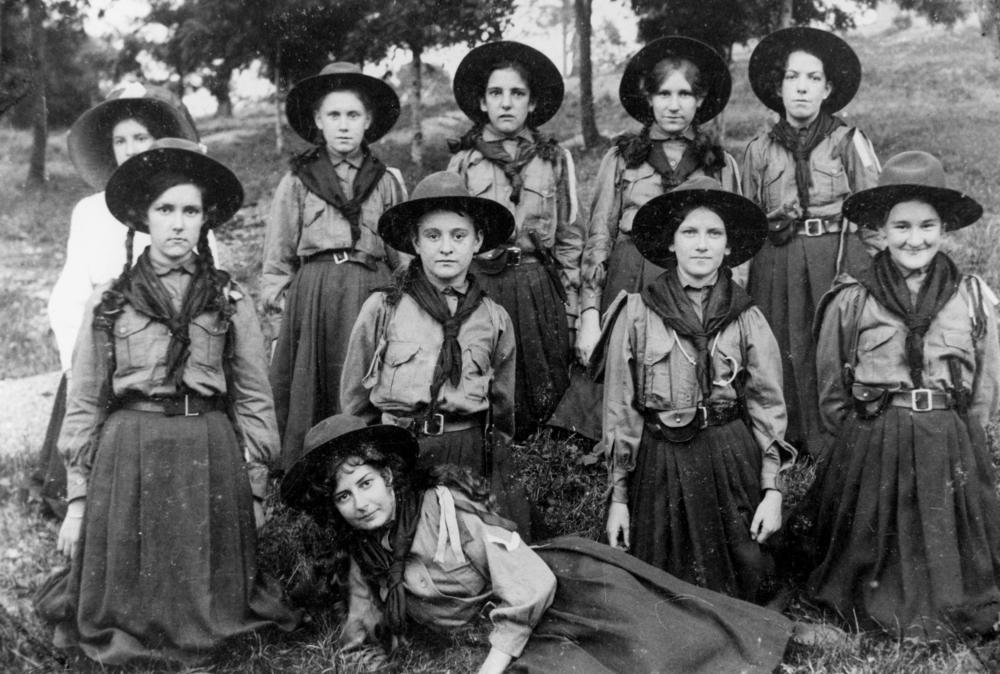
Bayswater Girl Aids c. 1911

The Scouting Movement was formed by boys reading Scouting for Boys (1908), and then seeking leaders to assist them. Guiding was similar. (Note: The history of Annerley suburb in Brisbane has an excerpt from Tarragindi Girl Guides Anniversary Cookbook 1919–1984: 'Although Guiding in Queensland is generally considered to have begun in 1919, Marjorie Grimes and her band of girls had already become proficient in their skills as far back as 1915. Most of the early Guides and Brownies attended the local Sunday School at the Congregational Church where 64 Cracknell Road now stands. Marjorie Grimes was their Sunday School teacher. When the girls discovered a book in the Church library describing the activities of the Girl Scouts in an English Village, they decided to copy their activities, and asked Marjorie Grimes to be their leader.' However, the book by most accounts was from a bookshop in Brisbane city.) In other states of Australia, today's Girl Guides had their origins as Girl Peace Scouts, Florence Nightingale Girl Aids, Baden-Powell Girl Guides, and in New South Wales' and Queensland's case, the League of Girl Aids.

The Bayswater Girl Aids, at Paddington, were active by February 1910, with new patrols to be formed at Clayfield (north Brisbane) and Yeronga (south Brisbane). It was also noted at the time: 'Scoutmasters are reminded that the League of Boy Scouts is a separate and distinct organisation from the League of Girl Aids. No Scoutmaster under the League of Boy Scouts can have any control whatever over companies of Guides who have their own lady officers appointed by their own League.'

Miss Marjorie Frances Grimes (1895–1956), of 'Tarragindi', south Brisbane, was instrumental in the formation of today's organisation. She became the honorary secretary on 15 November 1919 of the committee to establish the Girl Guide Movement in Brisbane. Grimes was the leader of the Tarragindi Girl Scouts (formed circa 1915), which became one of the first registered companies to the new state organisation in 1920.

The first Guide administrative meeting place was the YWCA rooms in Adelaide Street, Brisbane in 1920, but the name 'Girl Guide Headquarters' was not used until the third established office in Victory Chambers, Queen Street in 1923.

The organisation was known as the Girl Guides Association (Queensland, Australia), and later, Guides Queensland. From the British Royal charters of 1922 and 1949, the association is incorporated under the Guides Queensland Act 1970 (Qld).

=== Guiding today ===
Girl Guides Queensland is divided into 15 regions, including one that covers the whole state for Lone Guides (Lones region).:

- Brisbane North Region
- Capricorn Region
- Dalrymple Region
- Darling Downs Border Region
- Flinders Region
- Glasshouse Region
- Gold Coast Region
- John Oxley Region
- Lones Region
- Major Mitchell Region
- Moogerah Region
- Moreton Region
- Southern Cross Region
- Tropical North
- Wide Bay Region

A Queensland Guide Museum was opened in from Geebung, Brisbane in 2008, but as of 2015, was still being relocated. Currently the Girl Guides Queensland Archives is located in Chermside, Brisbane.

The organisation has several properties, but principally the Kindilan Outdoor Education and Conference Centre, Redland Bay.

== Gang Shows ==
- Brisbane Gang Show – started in 1952.
