= Order of World Scouts =

Fraternal order of the first international Scout organisation

- World Scouts emblem
- Country: Worldwide
- Founded: 11 November 1911
- Founder: World Scouts
- Inaugural Grand Scoutmaster: Sir Francis Fletcher-Vane, 5th Baronet
- Grand Scoutmaster: David Cooksley

The Order of World Scouts is a fraternal order of the World Scouts, the oldest international Scout organisation which was founded on 1 May 1911. The World Scouts inaugurated its Order on 11 November 1911 to serve the World Scouts, the Scout Movement and international ideals and society. The order is aimed at older scouts, those who have progressed from scouts because of their age and scoutmasters committed to Scout ideals of the Scout Promise and Scout Law. As part of the World Scouts, it is headquartered in England and has an administration headquarters in Italy.

As of November 2008, the World Scouts includes member associations in 14 countries – the United Kingdom, Italy, Australia, Peru, Jamaica, as well as two associations each for Poland, Argentina, Uruguay, Chile, the Dominican Republic, Bolivia, Brazil, Chile and three associations in Mexico, Ukraine and Nepal, Uganda, Honduras and the United States (United States Trailblazers). Members of these associations are eligible for admission to the Order.

== History ==
The World Scouts was formed by Sir Francis Fletcher-Vane, 5th Baronet upon the British Boy Scouts, which had spread across the British Empire, and the National Peace Scouts. The British Boy Scouts were formed in 1908 as the Battersea Boy Scouts. The Battersea Boy Scouts briefly registered with The Baden-Powell Boy Scouts in September 1908 but withdrew out of a concern that Baden-Powell's organisation was too bureaucratic and militaristic. The Battersea Boy Scouts (BBS) were reconstituted as the British Boy Scouts (BBS) and launched as a national organisation in March 1909.

Vane had been the Baden-Powell Boy Scouts London Commissioner. He felt that the Scout Movement should be non-military and pushed for the Baden-Powell Boy Scouts to be a more democratic organization. Through mediation, Vane reconciled various Scout organisations including the London Diocesan Boy Scouts and the British Boy Scouts with the Baden-Powell Boy Scout organisation, as affiliates. However, Baden-Powell appointed members of the National Service League, a pro-military group to his Boy Scouts Headquarters and Vane's position was eliminated. In a protest meeting, the London area Scoutmasters voted overwhelmingly in support of Vane. Baden-Powell promised to reinstate Vane but never did.

On 3 December 1909, Sir Francis Vane accepted the presidency of the British Boy Scouts, taking most London area Troops with him. The Quakers' Birmingham and Midland Troops also followed. Vane was instrumental in gaining Quakers to sponsor Scout Troops, with support given by George and Barrow Cadbury. Discussions with the pacifist Boy's Life Brigade led to the creation of the National Peace Scouts, launched on 1 April 1910. The World Scouts was an international extension of these efforts.

With Vane having an Italian summer home, he and his co-founder Remo Molinari were able to launch the Scout Movement in Italy with the Italian Boy Scouts (Ragazzi Esploratori Italiani) in 1910.

In 1911, in France, Vane assisted Augustin Dufresne, a ship owner, to organise a French Scout organisation.

With the spread of the British Boy Scouts program across the British Empire and to other English speaking countries and peoples via the CHUMS (paper) and Vane's connections in other countries, Vane aligned the various national Scout organisations as the "World Scouts", the first international organization, launched on 1 May 1911. This included the 'American Boy Scout'. The relationship with the American Boy Scout was short lived due to its overt militarism. Representation covered fifteen countries (counting Ireland as being separate) being; the UK, Ireland, Italy, the United States (isolated troops), Canada, France, Belgium, India, South America, China, South Africa, Egypt, Australia and New Zealand.

The World Scouts inaugurated its Order of World Scouts on 11 November 1911. The Order was aimed at older scouts, those too old to remain scouts and scoutmasters. The theme of a chivalric knightly order was adopted and its launch date was St. Martin's Day and the anniversary of Baldwin being proclaimed King of Jerusalem in 1100. Vane became the Grand Scoutmaster of the Order. The Order presaged Rovers with its similar purpose and knightly chivalric theme and the Alpha Phi Omega college fraternity.

Vane put his wealth behind the World Scouts, its Order, the BBS and other national Scout organisations: providing a London headquarters and financing the organisations, even the manufacture of Scout uniforms not only for the BBS, but also for the Italian Scouts. This over-burdened his finances to the point of having to declare bankruptcy. Thus the World Scouts and BBS lost their headquarters, source of equipment and uniforms, and their leader, Sir Francis Vane.

The World Scouts was left with member troops in England (remaining to the present) and in Australia. The Australian BBS, proved more resilient than was initially thought. The 4th Alexandria (Australia) British Boy Scouts existed in the 1950s, and possibly beyond that date, Individual members in Australia corresponded with the British Chief Commissioner up until the late 1960s. Robert Campbell, an Australian Scout researcher, traced the BBS in Australia and credits the continuation of membership in Australia to the 1990s, when the Scouts of Australia became the successors to the BBS, which "Ceased activity in Australia c. 1950s but retains members".

In the mid-1980s, expansion began again with members joining in Hawaii (USA). In the early 1990s, contact was made by a Scout organisation in Australia, followed by Scout organisations in other countries.

After contact in 1991 with the Independent Scouts of Australia Incorporated, (Note: The Australian organisation was known as "Independent Scouts of Australia Incorporated" 1986-1992, then "Scouts of Australia" 1992-2001, and finally reverting to the previous name for legal reasons, minus the addition of "Incorporated" in 2001) the World Scouts was more formally organised, with the appointments of a BBS Commissioner for Australia in 1991 and a Chief Commissioner of BBS & BGS in Canada in 1999.

== World Scouts member organizations ==
| Country | Group | Years |
|---|---|---|
| Argentina | Unión Scout Tradicionales de Argentina AC. | 2008–present |
| Australia | British Boy Scouts (AU) | 1911–1930s |
| Australia | Independent Australian Scouts formerly known as 'Scouts of Australia' (1992 to 2001) | 1991– |
| Belgium | Troop based in De Panne | 1911–1914 |
| Bolivia | Bolivia: USTA | 2008–2016 |
| Brazil | Brasil: USTA | 2008–2016 |
| Brazil | Brasil: AEMR | 2017–present |
| Canada | British Boy Scouts (Canada) | 1911–1919 |
| Canada | Canadian Independent Scout Association | 1999–2000 |
| China | The British Boy Scouts (Hong Kong) | 1911–1914 |
| Chile | FIDES Chile (Federación de escultismo Chilena) USTA | 2008–2016 |
| Chile | Agrupación de Escultismo Woodcraft de Chile USTA | 2003–2016 |
| Chile | Unión de Scouts de Chile USTA | 2008–2016 |
| Dominican Republic | Dominican Republic USTA | 2008–2016 |
| Egypt | The British Boy Scouts (Egypt) | 1911–1914 |
| El Salvador | Association of Traditional Scouts of El Salvador (ASTES) | 2016–present |
| France | French Scouts | 1911–1914 |
| Hawaii (USA) | Order of World Scouts Hawaii | 1985–2000 |
| Honduras | Association Of The Escultismo Traditional From Honduras (AETH) | 2017–present |
| India | The British Boy Scouts (India) | 1911–1914 |
| Ireland | British Boy Scouts (Ireland) | 1911–1914 |
| Italy | Italian Boy Scouts (Ragazzi Esploratori Italiani) | 1911–1914 |
| Italy | National Scout Training School (Scuola Nazionale Formazione Scout) | 2002–present |
| Jamaica | Girl Scouts of Jamaica | 2008–present |
| Mexico | Union of Traditional Scouts of Mexico (USTmex) | 2017–present |
| Mexico | Scouts Mexicanos AC | 2008–2011 |
| Nepal | Nepal Peace Scouts | 2016–present |
| New Zealand | The British Boy Scouts (New Zealand) | 1911–1914 |
| Peru | The Peruvian Association of Scouts Around the World (Asociacion Peruana de los Scouts Del Mundo) | 2008–2016 |
| Peru | Perù USTA | 2008–2016 |
| Poland | Drzewo Pokoju | 2002–present |
| Poland | Harcerska Gromada Wilkow | 2010–present |
| Poland | Stowarzyszenie Harcerskie Knieja | 2012–present |
| South America | The British Boy Scouts (Creillos, South America) | 1911–1914 |
| South Africa | The British Boy Scouts (South Africa) | 1911–1914 |
| Uganda | The Federation of Uganda Scouts | 2017–present |
| Ukraine | Organization of Ukrainian Scouts | |
| United Kingdom | British Boy Scouts | 1911–present |
| United Kingdom | British Girl Scouts | 1911–present |
| United Kingdom | British Girl's Nursing Corps | 1911–1912 |
| United Kingdom | The Order of the Redeemer | 1914–present |
| United Kingdom | Scout History Association | |
| United States | American Boy Scouts | 1911–1912 |
| Uruguay | Uruguay USTA | 2008–2016 |

== Grand Scoutmasters and other officers ==
Grand Scoutmasters

- Sir Francis Vane (1911–1912)
- Albert Jones Knighton (1913–1926)
- Rt Hon Lord Alington (1926–1932)
- Samuel Nalty Manning (1932–1967)
- Percy Herbert Pooley in-charge (1967–1971)
- Charles A Brown in-charge (1971–1983)
- Charles A Brown (1983–1992)
- Edward E Scott (1993–2000)
- Rev'd Michael John Foster (2000–2016)
- David Cooksely (2016–)

President

- Colonel Frederick Charles Keyser 1909
- Sir Francis Vane bt 1909–1913

Vice President

- Prince Di Cassano of Italy

Honorary President

- Mrs G White Brebble 1932
- Viscount Milton 1939
- The Rt Hon The Earl of Fitzwilliam 1948
- The Reverend Bill Dowling 1997

Assistant Grand Scoutmaster, Britain

- Captain Masterman 1911–1912
- L C Hobbs 1914–1926

Assistant Grand Scoutmaster, South Australia

- Joseph Regis-Coory 1911–1912 (Note: Joseph Regis COORY died on 20 September 1912 in Adelaide and it appears reference to him having been assistant grand scoutmaster to 1914 was the result of the use of old stationery.)

Assistant Grand Scoutmaster, South Africa

- H C Edwards-Carter 1911–1914

Assistant Grand Scoutmaster, France

- Monsieur Augustin Dufresne 1911–1914

Assistant Grand Scoutmaster, Italy

- Ivano Venerandi 2007–

Assistant Grand Scoutmaster, Poland

- Jerzy Gach 2009–

Assistant Grand Scoutmaster, Latinoamericana

- Francisco Arias 2017–

Chief Commissioner for Britain

- W G Whitby 1909–1911
- Percy Herbert Pooley 1926–1971
- Charles A Brown 1971–1983
- Rev'd Michael John Foster 1983–2000
- David Cooksely 2000–2017
- Paul Stevens 2017–

Chief Commissioner for Australia

- Robert Campbell 1991–2001

Chief Commissioner for Canada

- Bill Nangle 1999 Resigned

Chief Commissioner for Italy

- Ivano Venerandi 2006–2007

Chief Commissioner for Poland

- Jerzy Gach 2002–2008

Chief Commissioner for Argentina

- Osvaldo Fonseca 2008–2016
- Gabriel Palma 2017–2023
- Aldo Galeano 2023-

Chief Commissioner for Bolivia

- Rolando Farfan 2008–2016

Chief Commissioner for Brazil

- Salvio Avenor 2008–2016

Chief Commissioner for Chile

- Marcelo Vergara 2008–2016

Chief Commissioner for Republica Dominicana

- Roberto Torres 2008–2016

Chief Commissioner for Jamaica

- Lavinia McClure 2009–

Chief Commissioner for El Salvador

- Francisco Arias 2016

Chief Commissioner for Mexico

- Juventino Sandoval 2009–2011
- Miguel Chi 2017–

Chief Commissioner for Peru

- Josè Luis Duffoò Cornejo 2008–2016

Chief Commissioner for Ukraine

- Aleksander Matsiyevskyy 2009–

Chief Commissioner for Uruguay

- Jorge Villaran 2008–2016

Chief Commissioner for Ecuador

- Eduardo José Mera Alay 2010–2014

Chief Commissioner for Nepal

- Sudhan Maraseni 2016–present

== Italian Boy Scouts ==
Italian Boy Scouts
- Ragazzi Esploratori Italiani
- Country: Italy
- Founded: 12 July 1910
- Defunct: 1914
- Founders: Francis Vane; Remo Molinari
- Affiliation: World Scouts

Italian Boy Scouts (IBS) was the first Scout organization in Italy founded by Francis Vane and Remo Molinari lasting from 1910 to 1914. While short lasting, its existence influenced others to start other Scout organizations in Italy.

=== History ===
1. To do his duty to God, King and Country.

2. To help anyone whatever the cost.
3. To trust the word of a brother Scout and always tell the truth, if he lies he is no longer a Scout.
4. A Scout is loyal, he supports his friend and especially his comrade on any occasion.
5. A Scout is a friend to all and a brother to every other Scout, rich or poor, fortunate or unfortunate.
6. A Scout is courteous to all, especially to the weak, women, children, invalids and the crippled. A Scout is a gentleman, strong and must show his strength helping the weak.
7. A Scout is a friend of every living creature and will never allow an animal to suffer needlessly. He, like St Francis, feels himself brother to all living things, because he loves them and in exploring the hills has come to know them.
8. A Scout follows orders with intelligence, that is he reflects on the meaning of the order given and attempts to execute it. He is a soldier of the world and thinks before he obeys.
9. A Scout does not burden himself with sorrows, he smiles even when he suffers, because his pain will pass faster if he accepts it with a smile.

10. A Scout is thrifty but never mean. He saves not for himself but to have the means to help others.

— 1910 Oath, —Scout History Association

# The honour of a Scout is above every suspicion.

1. A Scout is loyal.
2. The duty of a Scout is to help others.
3. A Scout is a friend to all and a brother to every other Scout.
4. A Scout is courteous.
5. A Scout obeys orders.
6. A Scout loves and protects animals.
7. A Scout is always cheerful and smiling.
8. A Scout is thifty.

— 1911 Oath, —Scout History Association

Francis Vane's winter home was in Bagni di Lucca, Italy in the Apennine Mountains. Vane started a troop at a local school which spread the ideals of the Scout Movement and the backing of the Catholic Church. On July 12, 1910, an official launch of the Italian Boy Scouts at the Lawn Tennis Club in Bagni, followed with a royal inspection on November 6, 1910, at by King Victor Emmanuel with the co-founders of a troop of 30 boys. The royal inspection led to the patronage of the Italy King for the organization with the King becoming president of the Italian movement. For Rome organizer, Prince Di Cassano was appointed to the position. Initially, the REI had a long 10-point Scout Oath, but was replaced in 1911 with a shorter 9-point oath.

With World War I and other absence of Vane, the IBS ended in 1914 with many of the troops joining the National Explorers Youth Corps.

=== Symbols ===
The National Peace Scout Lily badge was initial used by Vane for the Italian Scouts plus a variant with "Be Prepared" beneath the lily for the Bagni troop. This was soon replaced by an Italian overly ornate lily. Being too ornate, this was replaced by a stone lily in the Lanaivoli Fiorenti Chapel in the Church of Corpoazioni Medioevali di S. Agostino found by a Scout.

== See also ==
- The Scout Portal
