= Scouting and Guiding in Australia =

The Scout and Guide movement in Australia consists of:

- Scouts Australia (The Scout Association of Australia), a member of the World Organization of the Scout Movement
- Girl Guides Australia, member of the World Association of Girl Guides and Girl Scouts
- Baden-Powell Scouts in Australia, member of the World Federation of Independent Scouts
- Independent Australian Scouts, formerly called "Scouts of Australia", linked to the Order of World Scouts.
- National Scout and Guide Fellowship, NSGF(A), formerly known as the Australian Fellowship of Former Scouts and Guides, which includes Trefoil Guild of Australia, Baden-Powell Guild of Australia, St. George's Guild of Australia, member of International Scout and Guide Fellowship

== Non-aligned Scouting organisations and Scout-like youth organisations ==
- Hashomer Hatzair Australia.
- Royal Rangers Australia, affiliated to Royal Rangers International refers to its activities as "scouting"
- Salvation Army Guards and Legion Activities (SAGALA), are programmes for young people between 5 and 18 and includes "scouting" programmes.

== International and ethnic Scout and Guide organisations operating in Australia ==
British Scouts – The Scout Association of Australia and its state branches began as branch corporations of The Scout Association of the United Kingdom and, until 1976, admitted only British Subjects to membership and programs and other nationalities only on special conditions and approval. After 1976 British subjects continued to be automatically admitted to membership while foreign subjects including residents were still subject to special conditions and approval.

A number of scout organisations for non-British subjects, including "Scouts-in-exile" from Ukraine, Baltic States, Russia, Hungary and Poland, were formed in the 1940s. Other exile associations were formed in the 1950s. Groups from the Hellenic Scouts and the Maltese Scouts organizations also formed during the 1950s.

- Hungarian Scouts served by Külföldi Magyar Cserkészszövetség – Hungarian Scout Association in Exteris
- Latvian Scout units
- Estonian Scout units.
- Lithuanian Scout units.
- Israel Scouts tribes.
- Russian Scouts, served by National Organization of Russian Scouts
- Armenian Scouts – Homenetmen, an Armenian organization devoted to athletics and Scouting is also active in Australia
- Ukrainian Scouts – Plast Ukrainian Scouting Organisation in Australia
- Polish Scouting Association, ZHP in Australia Inc
- Assyrian Eagle Scouts of Australia
- Vietnamese Scouting units in Australia.

== History ==
Scouting started in Australia with some informal troops in Western Australia and Victoria in 1907. Scouting was established in Australia in 1908, the year the first Boy Scout training handbook Scouting for Boys was published in England. CHUMS Scout Patrols started forming in Australia in 1908 due to the circulation of CHUMS publication there. R.C. Packer and the Sunday Times in 1908 supported the formation of the League of Boy Scouts. St. Enoch's Presbyterian Church, Mount Morgan, Queensland formed its unit on 23 November 1908.

The Boy's Brigade launched their Scout program in 1909. Troops under the British Boy Scouts (BBS) program began Australian operations in 1909. Other Scouting organizations formed in 1909 were: Imperial Boy Scouts (IBS), Church Scout Patrols program of the Anglican Church Lads' Brigade, Australian League of Boy Scouts Queensland, Girl Peace Scouts (Australia) and YMCA Scouts.

In 1910 the CHUMS Scout Patrols merged with the BBS. Also in July 1910, the Australian League of Boy Scouts Queensland affiliated to the United Kingdom's Boy Scouts Association and changes names to League of Baden-Powell Boy Scouts, Queensland Section. St. Enoch's affiliated their company with the Boy's Brigade Scouts in 1910. The IBS Victoria Section requested in September 1911 that the Minister of Defence allow IBS troops to undergo military cadet training under the military supervision, but were denied as being a voluntary association.

The Australian Boy Scouts founded in 1910 had merged with the Imperial Boy Scouts to become Australian Imperial Boy Scouts (AIBS) by 1912. In 1912, the Gippsland Boy Scout Association was formed and affiliated with the AIBS. The Church Scout Patrols ceased activities by 1912 while the League of Boy Scouts had stopped operating around 1914. Some of the Girl Peace Scouts joined the Voluntary Aid Detachments during World War I.

Baden-Powell visited Australia in May–June 1912 and in later years of March–April 1931 and December 1934, to encourage the extension of his Boy Scouts Association.

Baden-Powell's scouting organisation finally extended itself to Australia almost five years after founding, known as the Baden-Powell Boy Scouts in 1914 later rename to the Boy Scouts Association. Its New South Wales Section formed that year. While the League of Baden-Powell Boy Scouts, Queensland Section changes names again to Boy Scouts Association, Queensland Section.

Most of the remainders of the Girl Peace Scouts joined the Girl Guides in the 1920s. The Tasmanian, South Australia and West Australia Sections of the Boy Scout Association (BSA) are set up in 1920 and 1921. The Salvation Army's Life Saving Scouts start up in 1921. Norfolk Island Boy Scouts formed in 1922. A BSA Section for Victoria is set up in 1923. The Methodist Boy Scouts (WA) associated with Boy Scouts Association after 1924. Boy Scout's Association, Queensland Section merges with the rest of the BSA. The Boys' Brigade (BB) Scouts program ended in 1927 while the Catholic Boy Scouts' Association is formed the same year by the Society of St Vincent de Paul in New South Wales and Queensland. With the end of the BB Scouts, St. Enoch's unit becomes a BSA unit. Girl Guides under Australia administration were started on Norfolk Island, Christmas Island and the Cocos Islands in 1927.

The Boy Scout Association wanted their branches to receive monopoly status from the governments so as to control the Scouting movement. The BSA sent Overseas Commissioners in the 1920s and 1930s, along with Baden-Powell in 1931 and 1934, to Australia in support of this effort. In 1934, the BSA began a move to centralise control over its units by insisting on property being registered in the BSA's name instead of the local Scout Group. Also that year, the BSA's Queensland branch constitution was changed to remove State Council's elected local representatives. Scout Groups resisted but the BSA used World War II to further the centralisation.

Norfolk Island Boy Scouts, previously independent, registered with The Boy Scouts Association in May 1930. The final Girl Peace Scouts troop in Lindasfarne Tasmania ceased operating in 1935. In 1939, St. Enoch's Church, Mount Morgan scouts ceased its registration with the BSA and became independent as the Blue Boy Scouts. On 31 August 1932, the AIBS signed an agreement with the BSA of Australia to merge. but the merger was incomplete. In June 1943, Sir Leslie Orme Wilson, the Governor of Queensland, resigned as The Boy Scouts Association Chief Scout of Queensland in opposition to a large portion of public donations going towards the many salaries of headquarters staff, making the Chief Commissioner a paid position and its failure to respond to his call for reforms to its centralisation efforts that led to the severance of the Mount Morgan Blue Boy Scouts' registration with the BSA. He felt it was contrary to the first principles of Scouting but would continue to support the movement. Several scouts-in-exile groups get started in the 1940s for eastern European countries with four just for Ukrainians.

In the 1950s, the British Boy Scouts ceased being an active group but continued with members. The 1950s also see the Hellenic Scouts and Maltese Scouts formed. Several general scouts in exile groups also formed in this decade: Australian Association of Scouts in Exile (AASE) (NSW), Ethnic Scouts and Guides in Victoria (ESGAV) and Ethnic Scout and Guides of South Australia (ESGOSA). While the Blue Boy Scouts ceased operations in 1957. Australian sections created their own national Boy Scout Association in 1958.

The Vietnamese Scouts are founded in the 1970s and end soon in 1972 along with the Hellenic Scouts ending activities but continued as an interest group. While the 1970s see the Salvation Army replaced the Life Saving Scouts with the Boys' Legion.

The 1st Devonport Scouts went independent in 1981, ceasing affiliation with the BSA. Various Baden-Powell Scouts associations sprang up in 1985, which the Devonport Scouts affiliated with. In 1986, the Independent Scouts were formed.

=== Baden-Powell Scouts in Australia ===
The Baden-Powell Scouts in Australia was established in Australia in May 1984. In January 1990 they became legally incorporated in South Australia under the name "Baden-Powell Association Inc". The Baden-Powell Scouts in Australia is independent of The Scout Association of Australia and, despite its name, has no legal connection with the organisation founded by Lt. Gen. Robert Baden-Powell. The Baden-Powell Scouts started in Australia in two separate places, each without the knowledge of the other. The first one was in Tasmania, the Baden-Powell Scouts' Association (Tasmania) Inc. which formed in 1982, and the other was in Adelaide. The Baden-Powell Scouts in South Australia now has about 500 members, comprising three groups in the metropolitan Adelaide area. The 1st Devonport Scouts in Tasmania affiliated with the Baden-Powell Scouts in 1985. The one group of about 40 in Tasmania is also part of the association. There are 6 groups in New South Wales and 1 in Queensland. The Baden-Powell Scouts in Australia has a number of sections catering for a wide age range. These are Koalas, Joeys, Cubs and Venturers.

=== Independent Australian Scouts ===
Australia BBS activities continued until 1950, while members continue to exist in the organisation to present date.

The Independent Australian Scouts, also known as Scouts of Australia, is an organisation that was founded in 1986, becoming an affiliate and successor to British Boy Scouts in Australia.
