= Scouting and Guiding in Peru =

Scouting and Guiding associations in Peru

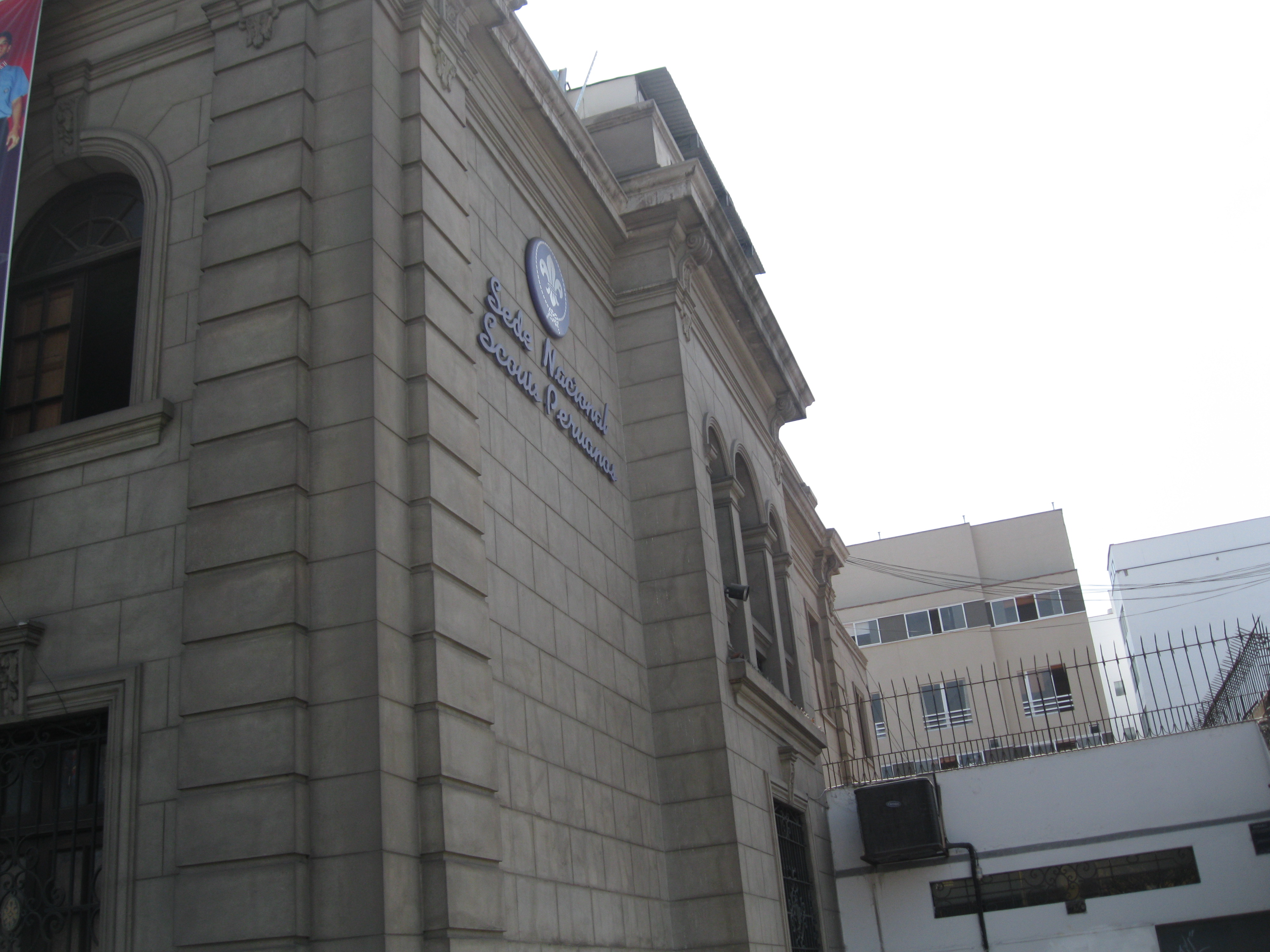
headquarters of the Asociación de Scouts del Perú

The Scout and Guide movement in Peru is served by

- Asociación Nacional de Guías Scouts del Perú, member of the World Association of Girl Guides and Girl Scouts
- Asociación de Scouts del Perú, member of the World Organization of the Scout Movement
  - Movimiento Scout Católico del Perú
- Asociación Peruana de Escultismo
- Asociación Peruana de los Scouts del Mundo, member of the Order of World Scouts
- Asociación Peruana de Scouts de Baden Powell
- Exploradores Peruanos, member of the Club de Exploradores
- Unión de Scouts Tradicionales de América Perú, member of the Order of World Scouts

== International Scout Units in Peru ==
There are also American Boy Scouts in Lima, linked to the Direct Service branch of the Boy Scouts of America, which supports units around the world.
