= GSJ =

GSJ may refer to:

- Gamelan Sekar Jaya, an American gamelan ensemble
- Girl Scouts of Jamaica, a scouting organization for girls in Jamaica
- Girl Scouts of Japan, a scouting organization for girls in Japan
- Grade separated junction, a type of road interchange
- Grossmann Jet Service (ICAO: GSJ), Prague, Czech Republic
- Great Saint James, a private island in the U.S. Virgin Islands
