= Girl Peace Scouts =

- Girl Peace Scouts, a New Zealand group that merged with the GirlGuiding New Zealand
- Girl Peace Scouts, an Australian scouting group that existed from 1909 to the 1920s with the final Girl Peace Scouts troop in Lindasfarne Tasmania ceased operating in 1935.
