= Scouting and Guiding in Honduras =

Scout and Guide movement in Honduras

The Scout and Guide movement in Honduras is served by:

- Asociación Nacional de Muchachas Guías de Honduras, member of the World Association of Girl Guides and Girl Scouts
- Association of Scouts in Honduras (Spanish: Asociación de Scouts de Honduras), member of the World Organization of the Scout Movement
- Asociación Hondureña de Escultismo Tradicional, member of the World Federation of Independent Scouts

== International Scouting units in Honduras ==
In addition, there are American Boy Scouts in Tegucigalpa, linked to the Direct Service branch of the Boy Scouts of America, which supports units around the world, as well as Girl Scouts of the USA.
