= Scouting and Guiding in Bolivia =

Scouting and Guiding associations in Bolivia

The Scout and Guide movement in Bolivia is served by

- Asociación de Guías Scouts de Bolivia, member of the World Association of Girl Guides and Girl Scouts
- Asociación de Scouts de Bolivia, member of the World Organization of the Scout Movement

== International Scout units in Bolivia ==
In addition, there are American Boy Scouts in La Paz, linked to the Direct Service branch of the Boy Scouts of America, which supports units around the world.
