= Scouting and Guiding in Jamaica =

Scout and Guide movement in Jamaica

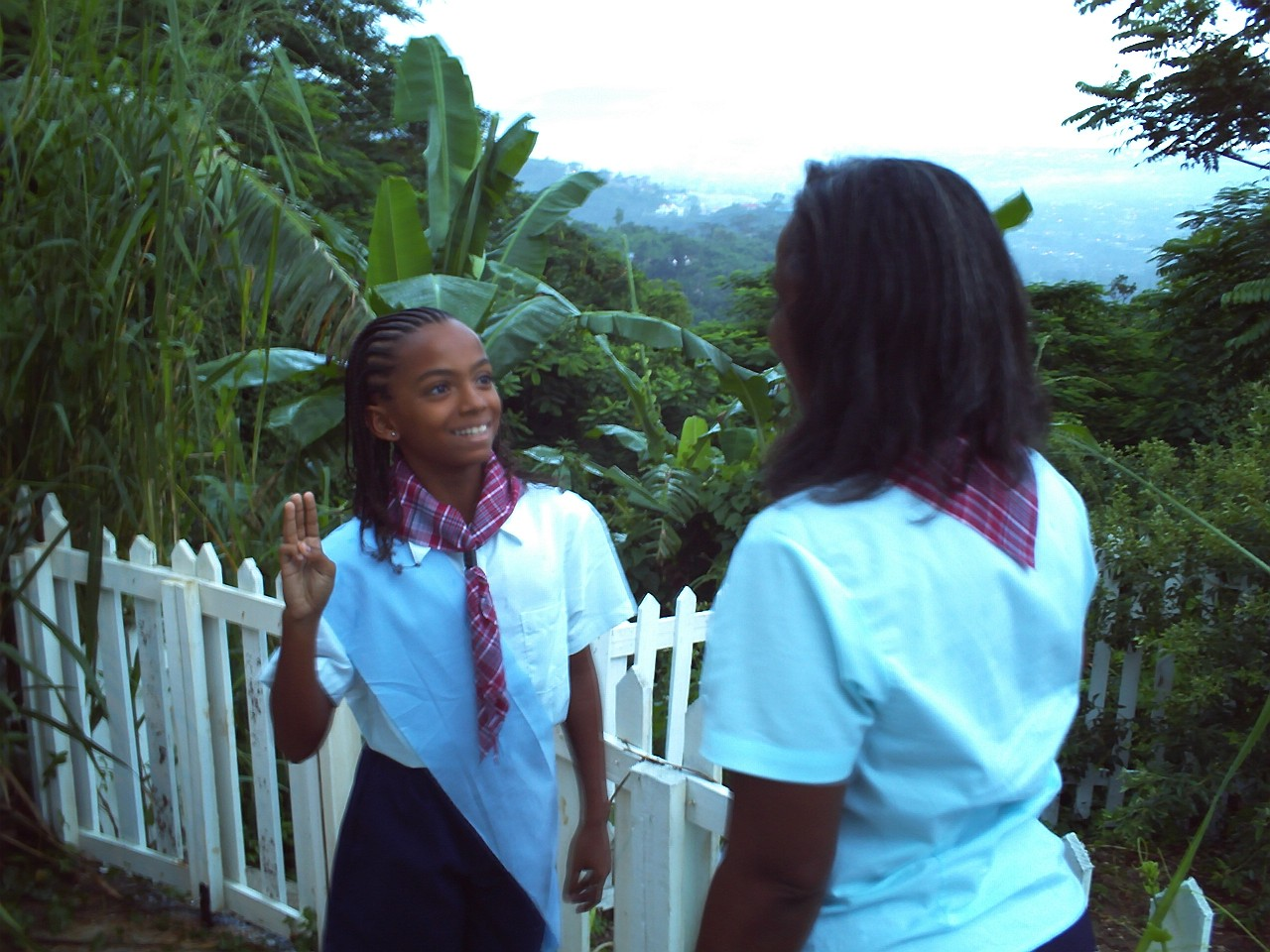

The Scout and Guide movement in Jamaica is served by

- The Girl Guides Association of Jamaica, member of the World Association of Girl Guides and Girl Scouts
- The Scout Association of Jamaica, member of the World Organization of the Scout Movement
- Girl Scouts of Jamaica, member of the Order of World Scouts
- Pathfinders and Adventurers

== History ==
Scouting came to Jamaica in 1910, the first troop being started by the Anglican clergyman Rev. Joseph William Graham in St Ann. Scouting spread quickly and in 1912 the first scout troop in St Catherine was established in Spanish Town. Lord Robert Baden-Powell met his wife Olave Soames on his way to Jamaica in 1912. It was there that he proposed marriage to her at the Myrtle Bank Hotel.

It was at the home of the first Spanish Town Scoutmaster, Mr Fitz Herbert Messias, that the first group of girls met. On March 11, 1915, his daughter invited over friends to discuss beginning a Girl Scout Troop. Clare Messias wrote a letter, dated March 16, on behalf of the group asking Miss Daisy Jeffrey-Smith to be their troop leader. Miss Daisy agreed and regular meetings began. Miss Marguerite Aitken was her assistant. The group met at "Durham House", home of the Jeffrey-Smiths. These Girl Scouts were renamed Girl Guides when they received their warrant from Miss Agnes Baden-Powell.

This Spanish Town Scout troop was also responsible for the establishment of Cub Scouts in 1916. Brownie Guides began in 1917 and Ranger Guides in 1919.

A scission of the Girl Guides Association led to the formation of the Girl Scouts of Jamaica in August 2008. The groups established were Peenie Wallies, Doctorbirds, Juniors and Seniors.

== Timeline ==
1902: Ernest Thompson Seton formed the Woodcraft Indians in Connecticut, USA

1906: Seton met Lord Robert Baden-Powell and introduced him to Woodcraft Scouting

1907, August 1–9: Baden-Powell had his first experimental Scout Camp

1907: Pathfinders started in the USA

1908: January - February, “Scouting for Boys” first published

1909: May 24, British Boy Scouts (BBS) (British Girl Scouts (BGS) started later)

1910: The Boy Scouts Association started in Britain

1910: Girl Guides started in Britain

1910: Boy Scouts started in Jamaica (SAJ)

1911: November 11, Order of World Scouts (OWS) formed

1915: March 11, Girl Guides started in Jamaica (GGA)

1922: World Organization of the Scout Movement (WOSM) formed

1928: World Association of Girl Guides and Girl Scouts (WAGGGS) formed

1963: The Scout Association of Jamaica (SAJ) admitted to the World Organization of the Scout Movement (WOSM)

1966: The Girl Guides Association of Jamaica (GGA) admitted to the World Association of Girl Guides and Girl Scouts (WAGGGS)

2007: Centenary Celebration of Boy Scouting (SA)

2008: August 5, Girl Scouts started in Jamaica (GSJ)

2008: Girl Scouts of Jamaica (GSJ) admitted to the Order of World Scouts (OWS)

2009: Centenary Celebration of British Boy Scouting and British Girl Scouting (BBS & BGS)

2010: Centenary Celebration of Girl Guiding (GGA, now GGUK)

2011: Centenary Celebration of the Order of World Scouts (OWS)
