= Scouting and Guiding in Chile =

Scouting and Guiding organizations in Chile

Escultismo en Chile
- Flor de lis del escultismo
- Country: Chile
- Founded: 21 de mayo de 1909
- Founders: Dr. Alcibíades Vicencio, el educador Joaquín Cabezas y el Dr. Miguel Dávila Varela.
- Website www.boyscouts.cl guiasyscoutsdechile.org fenaboy.cl scoutsdeldesierto.tk woodcraft-chile.webnode.cl fschile.cl unionscoutdechile.cl

Scouting in Chile is served by several independent organizations:

- Agrupación Nacional de Boy Scouts de Chile; member of the World Federation of Independent Scouts and signatory of the Roerich Pact
- es:Asociación de Guías y Scouts de Chile; member of the World Association of Girl Guides and Girl Scouts and of the World Organization of the Scout Movement
- Federación Nacional de Boy Scouts y Girl Guides Chile; member of the World Organization of Independent Scouts
- Agrupación Hermandad Scout del Desierto; member of the World Federation of Independent Scouts in northern Chile around the town of Antofagasta
- Agrupacion de Escultismo Woodcraft de Chile; member of the Order of World Scouts
- Federacion de Escultismo Chilena; member of the Order of World Scouts
- Unión Scout de Chile; member of the Order of World Scouts
- Federación Nacional de Boy Scouts y Girl Guides Chile; member of the Confederación interamericana de Scouts independientes

== Scouting on Easter Island ==
- Scouting also exists on Easter Island, in the Tatauro Mo A Rapa Nui.

== Emblems on Easter Island ==
Tatauro Mo A Rapa Nui

Tatauro Mo A Rapa Nui

== International Scout units in Chile ==
In addition, there are American Boy Scouts in Santiago, linked to the Direct Service branch of the Boy Scouts of America, which supports units around the world, as well as Girl Scouts of the USA.
