= Independent Australian Scouts =

Youth organisation in Australia

- Headquarters: Sydney
- Location: Australia
- Country: Australia
- Founded: 1986
- Founder: Robert Campbell
- Affiliation: World Scouts

Independent Australian Scouts, previously known as Scouts of Australia (1992 to 2001), is a Scouting organisation operating as a central umbrella organisation for independent local scout clubs or associations. Independent Australian Scouts is a member of the Order of World Scouts and became an affiliate and a successor to British Boy Scouts and British Girl Scouts Association in Australia.

== Programme ==
Independent Australian Scouts emphasises scouting as a simple, experiential, outdoor activity emulating frontier scouts in being self-reliant, thrifty and resourceful and useful and helpful. The association views the Scout Movement as part of the wider Woodcraft Movement. The association eschews the cult-like idolisation of Robert Baden-Powell, "family scouting", the unnecessary connection of scouting with later, ever more juvenile programs (such as Wolf Cubs, Beavers, Joeys, Keas and Squirrels), the over-involvement of adults, adult over-organisation of scouting, adults using scouting as a social outlet and the monopolisation and manipulation of scouting as a commercial product.

== History ==
Scouts' Promise

On my honour I promise to strive.
To seek and serve God, help other people and respect my country;
To keep myself mentally, physically and morally fit; and
To obey and live by the Scout's Code.

— Scouts of Australia website (2008)
Model Scouts' Code

A Scout is truthful and a Scouts' honour is to be trusted.
A Scout is faithful to parents, family, scouters, employers, country and to those under the Scout's control or responsibility.
A Scout is obedient to proper authority and conscience.
A Scout is to be useful and to help others in need at all times without reward.
A Scout is a friend to all and a brother/sister to every other Scout no matter to what nationality, race, class or creed the other belongs.
A Scout is considerate and courteous.
A Scout is cheerful and shows courage in all difficulties.
A Scout is self-respecting being clean in thought, word and deed
A Scout is thrifty, self-reliant and makes good use of time and possessions.
A Scout is a friend of nature and takes care of the environment.

— Scouts of Australia website (2008)

Independent Australian Scouts began as the Independent Scouts of Australia in 1986. The founding members were all former Queen's Scouts, with years of experience as scout leaders who were dissatisfied with the direction, costs and claims of The Scout Association of Australia. The association registered the name 'Independent Scouts of Australia Incorporated' in 1988. After contact in 1991 with the British Boy Scouts and British Girl Scouts Association, Scouts of Australia joined the Order of World Scouts.

In 1992, the organisation was incorporated nationally and renamed Scouts of Australia. Scouts of Australia successfully defended legal claims by The Scout Association of Australia to the exclusive right to use the name 'scout' and the fleur-de-lis scout emblem. The organisation's corporate name was changed to the present title in 2001.

Independent Australian Scouts operated under the name 'Scouts of Australia' from 1992 and registered the business name 'Scouts of Australia'.

Independent Australian Scouts adopted a logo consisting of a fleur-de-lis with a five-star southern cross constellation above the word 'Scouts' and applied for registration of a trademark 'Scout' in 1993, which was later withdrawn in the same year.

Independent Australian Scouts offers a very simple organisational structure.
