= The Girl Guides Association of Jamaica =

- Headquarters: 2 Waterloo Road; Kingston 10
- Country: Jamaica
- Founded: July 17, 1915
- Membership: 5,903
- President: Doreen Clemetson
- Chief Commissioner: Jean Kenny
- Affiliation: World Association of Girl Guides and Girl Scouts
- Website https://web.archive.org/web/20130711100152/http://ggaj.org/

The Girl Guides Association of Jamaica (GGAJ) is the Guiding organisation of Jamaica. It served 5,903 members (as of 2006). Founded in 1915, the girls-only organisation became an associate member of the World Association of Girl Guides and Girl Scouts in 1963 and a full member in 1966.

== History ==
Girl Guiding was introduced to Jamaica by Miss Clare Messias in 1915. After Jamaica's independence in 1962, the Jamaican Girl Guides remained a branch of the United Kingdom's Guide Association until July 17, 1967, when the Girl Guides Association of Jamaica was incorporated.

A scission of the association led to the formation of the Girl Scouts of Jamaica in 2008.

== Program ==
The association works in three age-groups:

- Brownies - ages 7 to 11
- Guides - ages 10 to 16
- Senior section - ages 14 to 20

One focus of the program is the prevention of AIDS.

== Ideals ==
Guide promise

I promise that I will do my best
To do my duty to God
To serve the Queen and my country and help other people
And to keep the Guide Law.

Guide Law

1. A Guide is loyal and can be trusted.
2. A Guide is helpful.
3. A Guide is polite and considerate.
4. A Guide is friendly and a sister to all Guides.
5. A Guide is kind to animals and respects all living things.
6. A Guide is obedient.
7. A Guide has courage and is cheerful in all difficulties.
8. A Guide makes good use of her time.
9. A Guide takes care of her possessions and those of other people.
10. A Guide is self-controlled in all she thinks, says and does.

Guide Motto

Be Prepared

== See also ==
- Scouting in Jamaica
- Girl Scouts of Jamaica
