= Leslie R. Mordecai =

International Commissioner of the Scout Association of Jamaica

Leslie R. Mordecai served as the International Commissioner of the Scout Association of Jamaica, and as a member of the Interamerican Region Committee of the World Organization of the Scout Movement, he was instrumental in the 20th World Scout Conference.,

In 1965, Mordecai was awarded the 35th Bronze Wolf, the only distinction of the World Organization of the Scout Movement, awarded by the World Scout Committee for exceptional services to world Scouting.
