= Donald FitzRitson =

Chief Commissioner of the Scout Association of Jamaica

Personal details
- Born: 26 August 1903 Falmouth, Jamaica

Donald Selvyn Adolphus FitzRitson OBE (born 26 August 1903) served as the Chief Commissioner of the Scout Association of Jamaica.

In 1973, FitzRitson was awarded the 78th Bronze Wolf, the only distinction of the World Organization of the Scout Movement, awarded by the World Scout Committee for exceptional services to world Scouting.

On 16 March 1974, his son Paul FitzRitson, a Kingston attorney and the executive chairman of National Sports Ltd., was the victim of a high-profile murder.
