= Elías Mendoza Habersperger =

Peruvian lawyer, diplomat and politician

Elías Mendoza Habersperger (August 9, 1933 – November 25, 2023) was a Peruvian lawyer, diplomat and politician, Chief Scout of Peru for the Asociación de Scouts del Perú who served as President of the InterAmerican Scout Council and a member of the World Scout Committee.

== Biography ==
Mendoza Habersperger was born in Lima on August 9, 1933. He was the son of Luis Mendoza Almenara and Dolores María Claudia Fermina Habersperger Fort. He studied at the Colegio Sagrados Corazones Recoleta. In 1950 he entered the Faculty of Sciences of the Universidad Nacional Mayor de San Marcos but later he oriented his vocation to other directions and entered the Faculty of Letters of the Pontificia Universidad Católica del Perú, later moving to the Faculty of Law of San Marcos, where he graduated from high school and obtained a law degree. In addition, he studied at the School of Political Management of the Inter-American Center for Political Studies of Venezuela.

He entered the Diplomatic Service by competition, working in Lima and in commissions in France and Argentina. While on his way to Buenos Aires, on his return to his diplomatic work, he learned of the coup d'état of July 18, 1962 against President Manuel Prado Ugarteche, for which, as soon as he stepped on Argentine soil, he resigned his duties as Vice Consul and Third Secretary at the embassy. In August of the same year he returned to Lima, and devoted himself to the legal profession. He worked as a lawyer for the Panagra aviation company, becoming Legal Manager.

Mendoza Habersperger was alderman of the Municipality of Metropolitan Lima, where he served as inspector of popular and youth recreation programs and social assistance to the underprivileged old age (1963). During the first government of the architect Fernando Belaúnde Terry, he was restored to the Diplomatic Service and promoted to Second Secretary. He was, in addition, General Manager of the Charity of Lima (1966). He was briefly Minister of Justice in 1968 before the coup d'état of General Juan Velasco Alvarado. During the dictatorship he went into exile in New York City and returned to Peru in 1975. He was a member of the Popular Action Party and was a Member of Parliament for Lima between 1980 and 1985. He was President of the Chamber of Deputies for one year beginning 26 July 1984.

In 1973, he was awarded the 82nd Bronze Wolf, the only distinction of the World Organization of the Scout Movement, awarded by the World Scout Committee for exceptional services to world Scouting.

Mendoza Habersperger died on November 25, 2023, at the age of 90.
