= The Scout Association of Jamaica =

The Scout Association
- The Scout emblem incorporates the coat of arms of Jamaica
- Location: 2D, Camp Road, Kingston 5
- Country: Jamaica
- Membership: 2,539
- Chief Scout: Sir Patrick Allen
- Affiliation: World Organization of the Scout Movement
- Website jascouts.tripod.com

The Scout Association of Jamaica, the national Scouting organisation of Jamaica, was founded in 1910, and became a member of the World Organization of the Scout Movement in 1963. The coeducational Scout Association of Jamaica has 2,539 members in 18 districts as of 2011.

In 1952, The First Caribbean Jamboree was held in Jamaica.

In 1965, Jamaica's Leslie R. Mordecai was awarded the Bronze Wolf, the only distinction of the World Organization of the Scout Movement, awarded by the World Scout Committee for exceptional services to world Scouting. Other honorees include Donald A. Fitz-Ritson in 1973.

Community service is a major part of Jamaican Scouting. There are camps held for disadvantaged youngsters, literacy campaigns, cleanups, tree planting and relief work during natural disasters.

The Governor General of Jamaica, Sir Patrick Allen is now the Chief Scout of Jamaica. Sir Patrick was invested by the Scout Association of Jamaica at a ceremony at King's House on September 4, 2009. Mr. Carlton Thompson is the International Commissioner of the Scout Association of Jamaica.

== History ==
- 1910- Scouting came to Jamaica with the first troop being started in Brown's Town, St. Ann, by the Rev. J.W. Graham.
- 1911 - First troop to be formed in Kingston was started by Mr. Harry Mills. Mr. D. L. Stephenson started Wolmer's Boys' School Troop.
- 1912 - First St. Catherine troop started by Mr. F.H. Messias in Spanish Town. Lord Robert Baden-Powell, who was then the Commonwealth Chief Scout, visited Jamaica. It was on his voyage to Jamaica that he met his wife, Olave Soames.
- 1913 - Jamaica Branch of the Boy Scout Association was registered. Captain Langley became the first Island Commissioner. The Island Camp was held at Clovelly Park on what are now the grounds of Kingston College.
- 1920 - The Association became the Boy Scout Association of Jamaica.
- 1925 - A contingent of Scouts from Jamaica was sent to the Olympia Jamboree in England, and has had representatives at every World Jamboree since then.
- 1952 - Jamaica hosted the first Caribbean Jamboree at Briggs Park (now Up Park Camp).
- 1958 - The Scout Headquarters was established at its present address, 2d Camp Road, Kingston. Scout Headquarters was established at its present address, 2d Camp Road, Kingston. Prior to this the headquarters was housed on the Doncaster Lands, by the sea in Kingston.
- 1977 - 6th Caribbean Jamboree was held at UWI, Mona, Jamaica
- 1985 - Fifth Pan American Jamboree was held in Jamaica ( G.C. Foster College). First Girl Scouts were registered from Portmore Gospel Assembly Scout Group in St. Catherine in September 1985.
- 1988 - A contingent of 4 Scouts from Jamaica was sent to Sydney Australia for the 16th world Jamboree
- 2006 - Jamaica hosted the 13th Caribbean Jamboree (Natures Way, Portland)
- 2019 - Jamaica hosted the 15th Caribbean Cuboree (Ocho Rios, St. Ann)

== Leaders ==
The Boy Scout Association of Jamaica had three Island Commissioners:

- 1932 - Noel Crosswell
- 1940 - Mr. H.D. Tucker
- 1949 - Mr. D.S. A. Fitz-Ritson

While Mr. Fitz-Ritson was in office the title "Island Commissioner" was changed to "Chief Commissioner" and since then there have been seven Chief Commissioners:

- 1979 - Mr. James Lloyd
- 1979 - Brig. Dunstan Robinson
- 1986 - Mr. Vincent Rose
- 1994 - Mr. Richard Chambers
- 1998 - Dr Edward Lee
- Stanford Davis JP
- 2007 - Rev. Barrington Soares JP
- 2013 - Mr. Maurice A. Brown JP
- 2020 - Mr. Garth Russell

== See also ==
- Scouting in Jamaica
