= Alcibíades Vicencio =

- Born: 1859
- Died: 30 April 1913 (aged 53–54)
- Occupation: Obstetrician gynecologist
- Known for: Founder of Scouting in Chile

Alcibíades Vicencio (1859 – 30 April 1913) was a Chilean obstetrician gynecologist and founder of Scouting in Chile. He met the founder of the World Scout Movement, Robert Baden-Powell during the visit Baden-Powell paid to Chile in March 1909, and was inspired to found Scouting there, which materialized in the founding of the Asociación de Boy Scouts de Chile, the second Scout association in the world and the first in the Americas. On March 26, 1909, Baden-Powell was keynote speaker at a display of Scouting held with Professor Joaquín Cabezas of the National Institute in the Hall of Honor of the University of Chile. That talk was attended mainly by students of the National Institute, who later helped Vicencio and Cabezas found the Brigada Central which had its first outing on May 21, 1909, to the Los Morros bridge over the Maipo River, located just south of the capital Santiago. This activity is considered the birthplace of Scouting in Chile. After his death, the Brigada Central took his name, being now known as Grupo Alcibíades Vicencio del Instituto Nacional.
