= Asociación de Guías y Scouts de Chile =

Association of girl and boy scouts in Chile

- Location: Avenida República # 97
- Country: Chile
- Founded: 1978
- Membership: 28,055
- Affiliation: World Association of Girl Guides and Girl Scouts, World Organization of the Scout Movement
- Website www.guiasyscoutsdechile.cl

The Asociación de Guías y Scouts de Chile (AGSCH) is the national Scouting organization of Chile, formed in 1978 through the merger of the Scout Association of Chile (ASCH) and the Girl Guides Association of Chile (AGCH). It is affiliated with both the World Association of Girl Guides and Girl Scouts (WAGGGS) and the World Organization of the Scout Movement (WOSM).

AGSCH holds consultative status with the United Nations on matters related to children and youth, and maintains membership in the Scout Parliamentary Union, which has over thirty members in Chile. The organization is involved in initiatives addressing health, nutrition, environmental conservation, and the inclusion of disabled individuals in society. As of 2021, AGSCH has 28,055 members.

== History ==
In 1909, the second Scout Association in the world was founded in Chile. It was inspired by the direct influence of Robert Baden-Powell who visited the country that same year. The founder of the Chilean Scouting movement was Alcibíades Vicencio. The Girl Guide Association of Chile was founded in 1935. After a long process, the two national associations, the Chilean Scout Association and the Catholic Scout Federation merged in 1978 to form the Asociación de Guías y Scouts de Chile.

The Asociación de Guías y Scouts de Chile hosted the 19th World Jamboree at Picarquín in December 1999. This was the first World Jamboree in South America. Scouts de Chile hosted about 30,000 Scouts with 1,343 Chilean staff and 5,625 Chilean Scouts participating.

== Program ==
Scouting in Chile has been a forerunner in social projects. The Asociación de Guías y Scouts de Chile have a center in the south, where they are involved in assisting poor children by providing meals, clothes and help with schooling. The ultimate goal of this project is to improve the conditions to the point where the children will be able to return home.

There is also a project in the poorer sections of Santiago. Several Scout groups have been formed for very poor children, giving them a meal a day and helping them to learn Scouting skills that will lead them to improve their living conditions. Programs have been established for disabled children. Scouts help with disaster relief. After one earthquake, Scouts took charge of shelters caring for thousands of victims.

== Sections ==
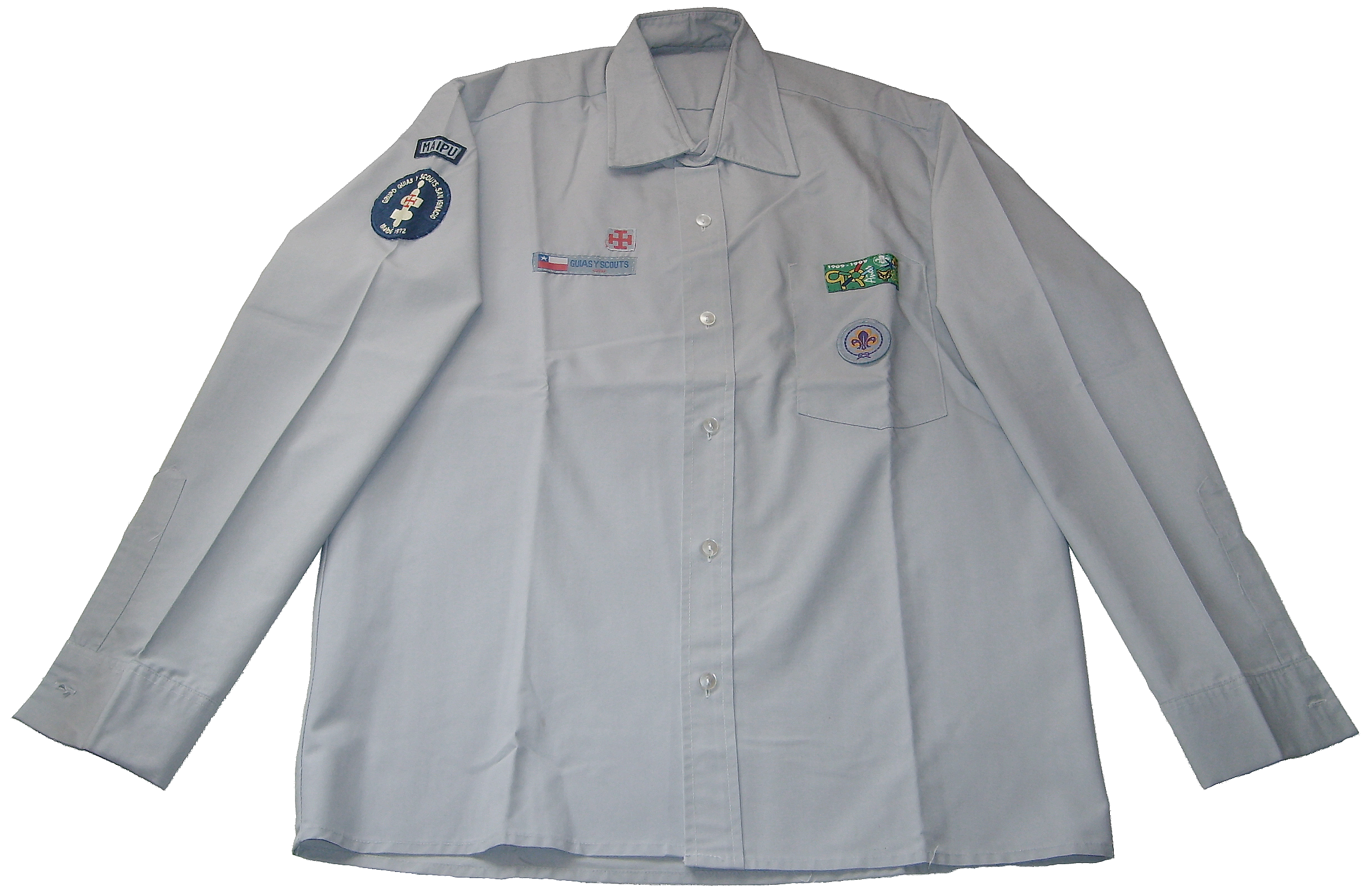
Uniform shirt of the Asociación de Guías y Scouts de Chile

=== Lobatos/Golondrinas ===
(Cubs/Brownies) - ages 7 to 11

- Motto: "Siempre Mejor" (Always Better)

A Lobatos group is named Manada ("Pack") A Golondrinas group is named Bandada ("Flock")

=== Scouts/Guías ===
(Scouts/Guides) - ages 11 to 15

- Motto: "Siempre Listo" (Always Ready)

A Scouts group is named Tropa ("Troop") A Guides group is named Compañía ("Company")

Troops and Companies are divided on work teams, of 8 persons, named Patrullas ("Patrols"), led by a Guía de Patrulla ("Patrol Guide").

On this section, boys and girls can achieve some Especialidades ("Specialties"), that are a synonym for Merit Badges.

=== Pioneros ===
- Pionero (Pioneers) [ages 15 to 17]
  - Motto: "Siempre Adelante" (Always Ahead)

A Pioneros group is named Avanzada ("Advanced") These groups are subdivided into Comunidades ("Communities"), led by a Coordinador ("Coordinator").

=== Caminantes ===
- Caminante (Rovers) [ages 17 to 20]
  - Motto: "A servir" (To Serve)

A Caminantes group is named Clan

These groups are subdivided into Equipos ("Teams"), led by a Vocero ("Spokesperson").

== Scout Law ==
=== Lobatos/Golondrinas ===
The Lobato/Golondrina:

- Knows and takes care of his/her body
- Tries to solve his/her problems
- Is joyful and tells the truth
- Knows how to listen, and says what he/she feels
- Is friendly and helps the others
- Learns how to know God

=== Scouts/Guías/Pioneros/Caminantes ===
The Scout/Guía/Pionero/Caminante:

- Is trustworthy
- Is loyal
- Serves, never expecting a reward
- Shares with everyone
- Is joyful and cordial
- Loves nature, and in nature discovers God
- Knows how to obey, and does nothing only half-way
- Is optimistic
- Takes care of things because he/she values work
- Is pure, in thought, speech and work
- Is always kind

== Scouting in Easter Island ==
- Scouting also exists on Easter Island, in the Tatauro Mo A Rapa Nui.

== International Scout units in Chile ==
- In addition, there are American Boy Scouts in Santiago, linked to the Direct Service branch of the Boy Scouts of America, which supports units around the world, as well as Girl Scouts of the USA.
