= Scouting and Guiding in Brazil =

Scouting and Guiding Organizations in Brazil

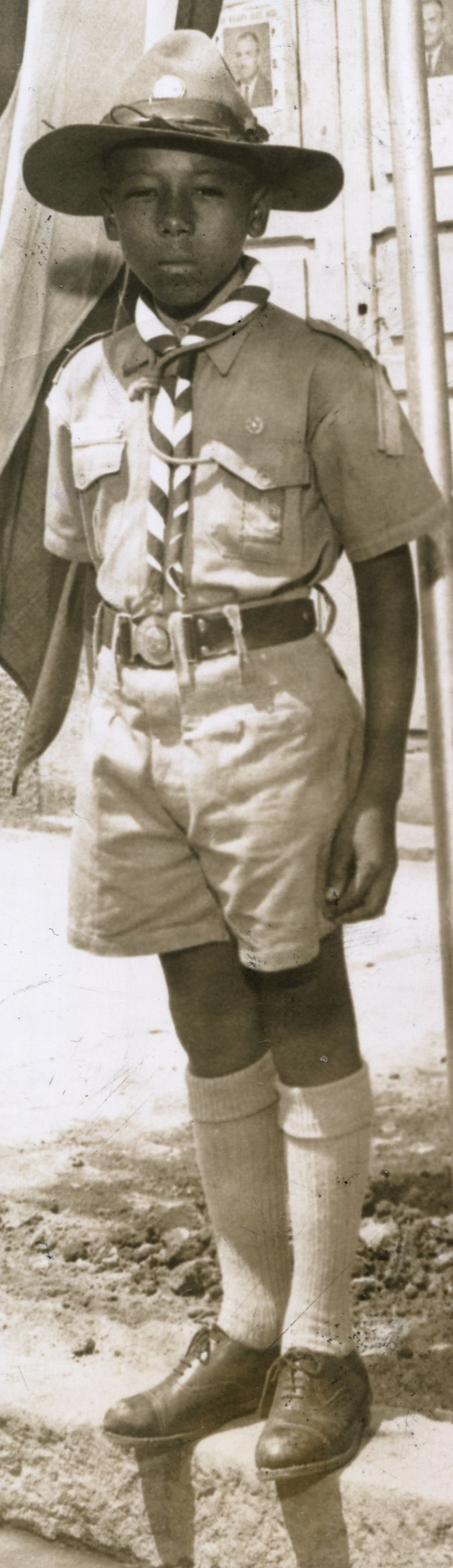
Brazilian boy scout, 1958

The Scout and Guide movement in Brazil is served by:

- Federação de Bandeirantes do Brasil (Girl Guide Federation of Brazil), member of the World Association of Girl Guides and Girl Scouts
- União dos Escoteiros do Brasil (Union of Brazilian Scouts), member of the World Organization of the Scout Movement
- Associação Escoteira Baden-Powell, provisional member of the World Federation of Independent Scouts
- Clube de Desbravadores do Brasil, affiliated to Pathfinders
