= Asociación de Scouts del Perú =

Peruvian scouting organisation

- Headquarters: Avenida Arequipa № 5140
- Location: Miraflores District, Lima
- Country: Peru
- Membership: 4,852
- Affiliation: World Organization of the Scout Movement
- Website http://www.scout.org.pe/

The Asociación de Scouts del Perú (ASP, English: Scout Association of Peru) is the national Scouting organization of Peru. Peruvian Scouting was founded in 1911 and was among the charter members of the World Organization of the Scout Movement in 1922. It has 4,852 members (as of 2011).

Vocational training is provided in a number of fields. There are many community services and Scouts work with the Red Cross in some of their programs. Conservation programs are stressed. Scouts have the opportunity to visit jungle villages and learning about the conservation of nature first hand. Tree planting is done by many groups. Scouts work to restore and maintain ancient Inca sites such as Machu Picchu and Cusco. A number of Scout projects deal with increasing food production and improving nutrition in communities.

== History ==
The Asociación de Scouts del Perú was founded by Juan Luis Rospigliosi (June, 24 1854-July 24, 1935) on May 25, 1911 at Barranco English Institute in Lima. In October 1913 the second Scout brigade formed.

In 1916, the Society of Girl Guides was founded by the first Chief Guide, Elsa Hansen Daranyi.

On April 3, 1933, father Benito of the Colegio La Recoleta founded the first Cubs pack, Barranco district in Lima.

On June 22, 1941, Rover clan 5 of Lima was founded by father Chiaffredo.

On July 3, 1942, Sea Scouts was founded.

In 1946, the national headquarters was established by the first Chief Scout, engineer José Toribio Flores León.

In 1966, Law 16666 declared Scouting a "necessity and public utility".

From August 7 to 11, 1972, the 8th Interamerican Scout Conference was held at the Crillon Hotel in Lima.

In 1973, Dr. Elías Mendoza Habersperger was awarded the Bronze Wolf, the only distinction of the World Organization of the Scout Movement, awarded by the World Scout Committee for exceptional services to world Scouting.

On April 15, 1975, the present national headquarters was acquired.

In 1983, the first National Jamboree was held in Chiclayo.

In 2004, the Caminantes program section was created for Scouts aged 15 to 18.

In 2007, "Operation Be Prepared" aided earthquake victims.

In 2011, the centennial National Jamboree was held at the National Agrarian University.

From January 4 to 11, 2015, the ninth National Jamboree was held in Chimbote.

== Emblems ==
The original fleur-de-lis emblem created in 1913

From 2013 the organization uses the WOSM brand for its logo, like the South African Scout Association logo but with "Perú" added. The original fleur-de-lis emblem created in 1913 is still used as the Scout section badge and features a stylized Inti, the Andean sun-god.

== Program sections ==
- Lobatos/Cubs-ages 7 to 11
- Scouts-ages 11 to 15
- Caminantes/Venturing-ages 15 to 18
- Rovers-ages 18 to 21

== Scout Motto ==
Siempre Listo, Be Prepared

== Scout Promise ==
Por mi honor prometo hacer cuanto de mi dependa para cumplir mis deberes para con Dios, patria y padres. Ayudar al projimo en toda circunstancia y cumplir fielmente la ley Scout.

== Scout Law ==
- El Scout genera confianza.
- El Scout es leal en lo correcto.
- El Scout es util y ayuda a los demas sin pensar en recompensas.
- El Scout es amigo de todos y hermano de cualquier Scout sin distincion de credo, raza, clase social o nacionalidad.
- El Scout es cortes y caballeroso.
- El Scout ve en la naturaleza la obra de Dios, cuida y protege a los animales y las plantas.
- El Scout obedece en lo correcto teniendo siempre en cuenta los Derechos Humanos y termina lo que empieza.
- El Scout sonrie y canta ante sus dificultades.
- El Scout es exitoso, economico, trabajador y cuidadoso del bien ajeno.
- El Scout es limpio y sano, puro de pensamientos, palabras y acciones.

== See also ==
- Asociación Nacional de Guías Scouts del Perú
