= The Boys' Brigade Australia =

Christian uniformed youth organization in Australia

The Boys' Brigade in Australia is a Christian uniformed youth organisation in Australia, which is part of the global Boys' Brigade movement.

== History ==
The Boys' Brigade was first introduced into Australia well within a decade of the formation of the movement in Glasgow by William Smith. In 1890–91, a Company was formed at the St. Mark's Church of England, Fitzroy, Melbourne. The next Company to be formed was at the Wesley Church, Perth in 1895 and this was very quickly followed by Companies in each of the other States on a fairly scattered basis.

To provide a more coordinated basis for growth, an Australian Council was formed at the turn of the century, based in Sydney. The first Annual Report in 1900 noted that the Secretary knew of 15 Companies functioning with a membership of 431 Boys and 41 Officers. The first Battalion Council was formed in Adelaide in 1901 and comprised four Companies.

In the beginning of the 20th century, several Companies of the Naval Boys' Brigade were formed, mainly in Victoria, and in 1907 separate Battalions of Military and Naval Companies were formed in that State. Most of these Companies merged with the Government scheme of Military Training for Boys of 12 and upwards introduced in July 1911; as a result of this scheme, plus the drain on leadership into the Armed Forces, few Companies survived the First World War.

Their Scout program was launched in 1909. St. Enoch's Presbyterian Church, Mount Morgan, Queensland formed its Boy Scout unit on 23 November 1908, under Benjamin Gilmore Patterson. The unit was registered with the Boys' Brigade (BB) Scouts as the lst Mount Morgan Company in 1910.

There was one notable exception. In 1913, a new 1st Brisbane Company had been formed at the Ithaca Presbyterian Church, led by a Mr. George Orr, a former Lieutenant of the 1st Glasgow Company under the Captaincy of Sir William A. Smith. The formation of this Company marked the commencement of the present era of The Boys' Brigade in Australia. In the years following the First World War, a former Captain of the 5th Dublin (Ireland) Company, Rev. J. Wesley Smith, who had migrated to Western Australia, after correspondence with Mr. Orr, was instrumental in the formation of the 1st and 2nd Fremantle Companies at Fremantle Baptist Church and Wesley Church, Fremantle, respectively, and the 1st Northam Company at Northam Presbyterian Church, W.A. It was not until 1929 that a new 1st Melbourne Company was formed at Armadale Baptist Church, Melbourne, and a new 1st Sydney Company was formed at Glebe Presbyterian Church, Sydney. Of these, only the 1st Brisbane is still active.

No further Companies were formed in Queensland or Victoria up to the outbreak of the Second World War and in New South Wales growth was extremely slow, there being 18 Companies active in Sydney at that time. However, the immediate post-war years saw a rapid spread of the Movement so that there are now Companies in all States and Territories.

The Boys' Brigade (BB) Scouts program ended in 1927 while the lst Mount Morgan Company continued.

Another point of interest relating to the pre-Second World War years is that, upon the Brigade becoming more active in New South Wales in the early 1930s, it was pointed out that other non-uniformed Boys’ Organisations had been operating in Sydney and Adelaide for many years under the name The Boys’ Brigade and had been incorporated in those States as Limited Companies. As a result, they no longer had the legal right to the use of the name The Boys' Brigade in New South Wales and South Australia and ultimately agreed to use the name The British Empire Boys' Brigade. In 1970, the Australian Council adopted the name "The Boys' Brigade Australia" and the Movement is now known by that name in all States of Australia.

In 1948, the Overseas Committee of The Boys’ Brigade Executive Committee in London, appointed Mr. Robert McEwan (Captain of the 3rd Sydney Company) to act as Honorary Organiser for Australia and acting under this authority Mr. McEwan invited one Officer in each State to join him in what was called the Provisional Federal Advisory Committee (P.F.A.C.). This body continued to operate until 1955 when each State was invited to appoint two representatives to the committee.

The enlarged P.F.A.C. paved the way for the formation of The Australian Council and on 1 January 1958, The Boys' Brigade Australian Council was formally constituted. A fitting tribute was paid at this time to the oldest Company in Australia, the 1st Brisbane Company, when its captain, Mr. R.H. Tait, was elected the first President of the Australian Council.

Mention should be made of Mike Hoare's history: Boys, Urchins, Men (1980).

== Groups within a Company ==
Groups within Boys' Brigade

- Anchors (formerly Anchor Boys) - 5 to 7 years of age
- Juniors (formerly No. 1 Section) - 8 to 11 years of age
- Seniors (formerly No. 2 Section) - 12 to 18 years of age

Ranks of the Boys

- Private
- Lance Corporal
- Corporal
- Sergeant
- Staff Sergeant

Provision is made for a Boy aged 12 years to remain in the Juniors (formerly No. 1 Section) before promotion to the Seniors (formerly No. 2 Section). They can stay until they turn 19.

Officers Within Boys' Brigade Australia

- Non Commissioned Officer
- Helper
- Staff Sergeant
- Warrant Officer
- Lieutenant
- Chaplain
- Officer in Command
- Captain

== Sources ==
- Shave, Peter. "Australian BB History".
- Shave, Peter. "Groups in BB".
- No. 1 Section in Action. NSW, Australia: The Boys' Brigade Australia. 2000. p. 2.

== See also ==
- Boys' Brigade
- Girls' Brigade
