= Girl Scouts of Jamaica =

Scouting organization for girls in Jamaica

- Country: Jamaica
- Founded: August 5, 2008; Launched October 5, 2008
- Founder: Mrs Lavinia McClure
- Affiliation: Order of World Scouts
- Website http://girlscoutsjm.freehosting.net/

Girl Scouts of Jamaica (G.S.J.) is a Christian faith-based scouting organization for girls in Jamaica founded on August 5, 2008. The girls-only organization is a member of the Order of World Scouts.

Membership is voluntary and open to all girls and young women regardless of creed, race, nationality or any other circumstance, provided that the member is willing and committed to uphold the promise and the law of the movement. Leaders must uphold the promise, law and constitution.

== History ==
The Girl Scouts of Jamaica were established in August 2008, out of concerns about administration and the changing of the programme of the Girl Guides Association of Jamaica. The Girl Scouts of Jamaica desire was to have a democratic structure and to embrace the traditions of the eight point programme and camp craft. They joined the Order of World Scouts, with whom they shared ideals and vision, right after their October 2008 launch promise ceremony.

== Ideals ==
The Promise Pin

The Promise

On my honour,
I promise that I will do my best:
To do my duty to God,
To serve my country and help other people,
And to obey the Scout Law

The Law

A Scout's honour is to be trusted.
A Scout is loyal.
A Scout is helpful.
A Scout is a friend to all.
A Scout is courteous.
A Scout respects the environment.
A Scout obeys orders.
A Scout is cheerful under all difficulties.
A Scout is thrifty.
A Scout is pure in thought, word and deed.

The Motto

Be Prepared

The Promise Pin

The traditional fleur-de-lis is presented in Jamaican national colours. The fleur-de-lis is significant in two ways. In ancient Christian culture it was used to represent the Holy Trinity. In scouting it signifies the three-fold promise: "Duty to God", "Service to Man", "Obedience to the Law".

== Age groups ==
The organization works with four age-groups:

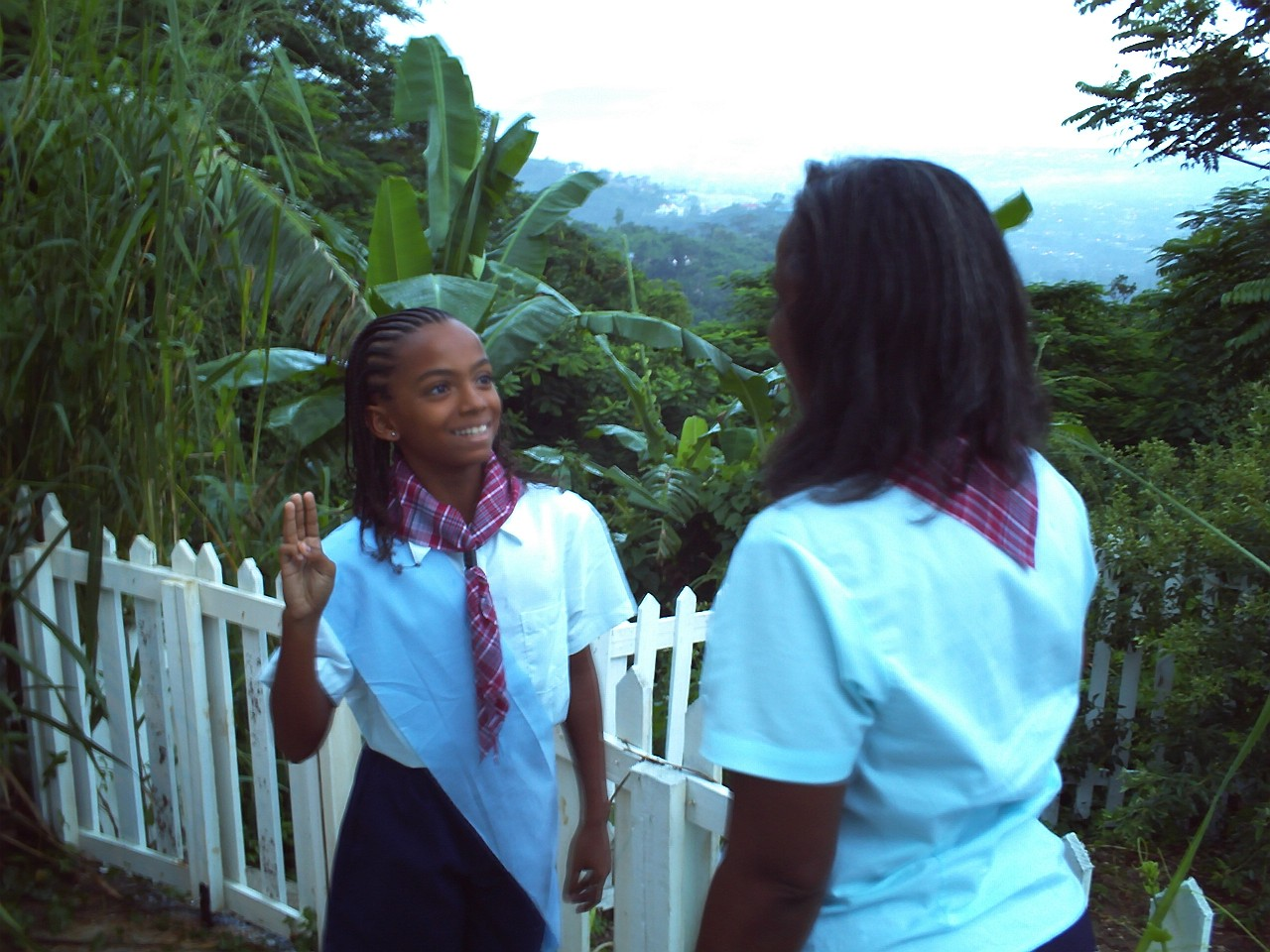
The First Junior Scout

- Peenie Wallies; 4 to 8 years, kindergarten to grade 3
- Doctorbirds; 7 to 12 years, grades 3 to 6
- Junior Scouts; 10 to 16 years, grades 7 to 10
- Senior Scouts; 14 to 19 years, grades 10 to 13
- Assistant Leaders; 16+ years
- Leaders; 18+ years

== Programme ==
The eight point programme offers a variety of activities for the girls to do in a variety of areas of interest. The eight points are similar at all levels, but the presentation changes to be suited to the age groups.

Peenie Wallies:	Doctorbirds	Girl Scouts	Adults
are knowing and growing	Let's be Aware	Looking Ahead	Intelligence
enjoy listening and moving	Let's get Physical	Physical Fitness	Fitness and Health
make a promise	Let's do it Right	Obeying the Law	Morals and Values
enjoy making things	Let's Create	Creativity	Creative Expression
enjoy playing together	Let's Love	Relationships	Social Skills
are ready to help	Let's Serve	Service	Service
enjoy helping at home	Let's do Homecraft	Homecraft Skills	Homecraft and Hospitality
enjoy exploring and discovering	Let's enjoy our Environment	The Environment and You	Environment

Each girl does challenges in each of the eight points and receives a progress award after completing an approved set of challenges.

== National Service Project ==
The Girl Scouts of Jamaica have selected the Special Olympics Jamaica as their National Service Project for the period 2008-2012. Scouts at all age levels participate in fund-raising, while senior and junior scouts also help by volunteering at sporting events which are held all across the island.

== Special events ==
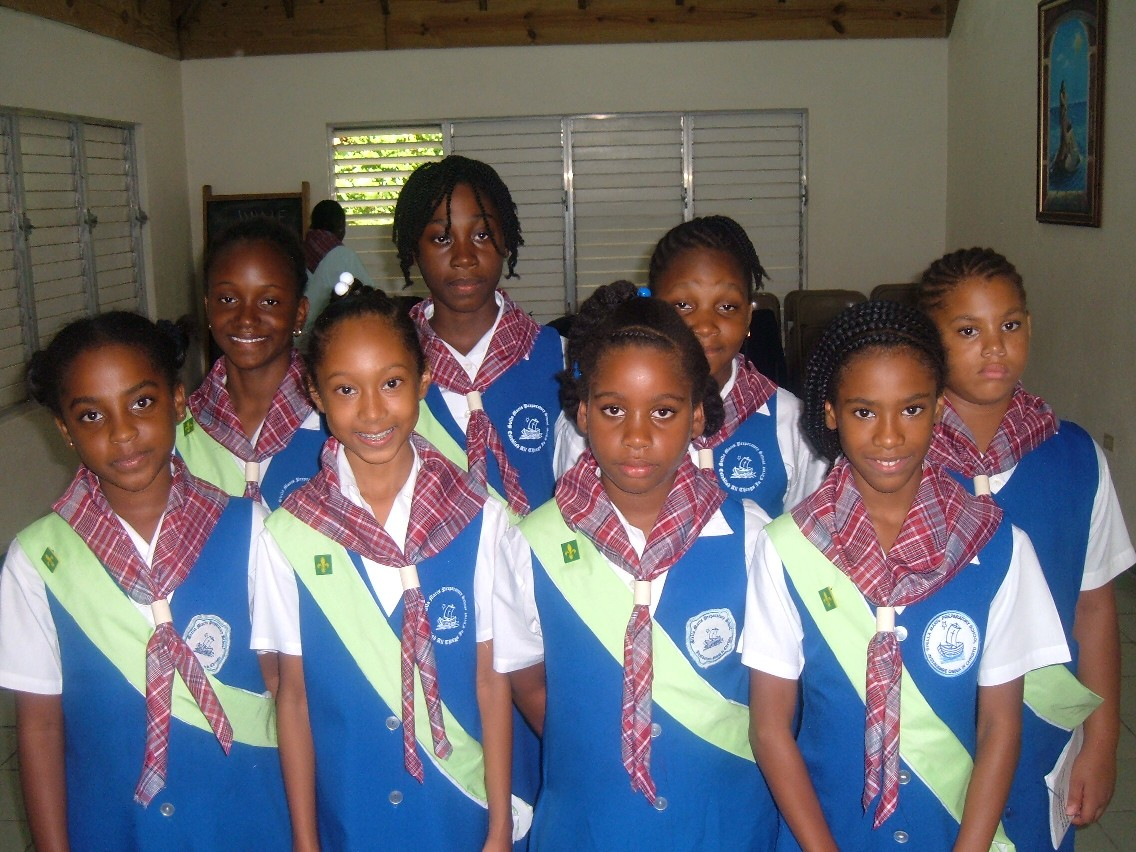
The First Doctorbirds.

- September 1 - Start of the Girl Scout year, coinciding with the school year start
- October 5 - Founders' Day, Anniversary of the first promise ceremony
- November - World Scouting Month, coinciding with National Youth Month
- November 11 - Anniversary of the founding of the Order of World Scouts (1911)
- December - Service Month
- January - Leaders' Planning Month
- January, last Saturday - Annual Leaders' Conference
- May - Girl Scouting Month, coinciding with National Child Month
- May 24 - Anniversary of the founding of the British Boy Scouts and British Girl Scouts (1909)
- August 5 - Anniversary of the founding of the Girl Scouts of Jamaica
- August 31 - End of the Girl Scout year, coinciding with the school year end

== See also ==
- Scouting in Jamaica
