= Baden-Powell Guild (Australia) =

- Motto: Scouting and Guiding Lives On
- Location: Australia

The Baden-Powell Guild of Australia is an Organisation of adults, who have previously been Youth Members or Leaders in the Scout or Guide Movements, and believe they never want to abandon the ideals and principles, that they grew up learning and perfecting. Every State of Australia has a "Branch" and within each State the variously named groups are officially called "Sub-Branches". There are over 760 Members in more than 47 Sub-Branches within Australia and all are aligned to The International Scout and Guide Fellowship (ISGF) which is accessed through a body in Australia known as 'National Scout & Guide Fellowship of Australia" or NSGF(A).

These adults try to maintain Fellowship through an interactive social life, as well as supporting the Youth side – by raising funds in support of projects (attendance at Jamborees, training, assistance to those in need), and many others. They also help in passing-on skills learned, as well as physical help with 'Gatherings' and even to the physical building of meeting places, resources etc.

They organised the 27th World Conference of the International Scout and Guide Fellowship in Sydney in October 2014.

== See also ==
Scouting and Guiding in Australia
