= Asociación de Scouts de Bolivia =

National Scouting association of Bolivia

- Headquarters: calle litoral #300, Cochabamba
- Country: Bolivia
- Founded: 1911
- Membership: 7,898
- Affiliation: World Organization of the Scout Movement
- Website http://www.scoutsdebolivia.org/

The Asociación de Scouts de Bolivia (ASB) is the national Scouting association of Bolivia. Scouting was founded in Bolivia in 1911 and became a member of the World Organization of the Scout Movement in 1950. ASB has 7,898 members (as of 2011).

Scouting is active in rural and urban areas of the country, and open to all young people of all religions. 90% of all members are Catholic, and the church sponsors many groups.

The Asociación de Scouts de Bolivia prides itself on having members of many social classes, both the cities and rural areas. There are groups for handicapped children. There has been a great effort to make Scouting available to handicapped and disadvantaged youngsters, including youngsters in state orphanages.

Many Scout activities involve community service projects such as environmental protection, food production, tree planting and literacy.

The Scouts have built several community development centers with the help of the German Scouts, American Scouts, and Spanish Scouts, among many others. These community centers are located in Cochabamba (headquarters); where a library and some other community development buildings are located, besides a convention center; La Paz (past headquarters), also a library and other community development buildings, featuring assistance centers; and Santa Cruz. Other community centers are scheduled to be built, as of 2006.

== Program and ideals ==
- Lobatos-ages 6 to 10
- Exploradores-ages 11 to 14
- Pioneros-ages 15 to 17
- Rovers-ages 18 to 21

The Scout Motto is Siempre Listo (Always Prepared).

The membership badge of the Asociación de Scouts de Bolivia incorporates a tulip in the national colors of the flag of Bolivia.

== Regions ==
The Scout Movement in Bolivia represented as Asociacion de Scouts de Bolivia, is present in 8 of the 9 administrative divisions (departments): La Paz, Cochabamba (where the main office is), Santa Cruz, Oruro, Potosí, Tarija, Chuquisaca and Beni, there is still the task to found an office on Pando.

== Scout Oath ==
Por mi honor prometo, hacer cuanto de mí dependa para cumplir mis deberes para con Dios, los demas y conmigo mismo, ayudar al prójimo en toda circunstancia y cumplir fielmente la Ley Scout.

Translation:

For my honor, I promise to do my best to fulfill my duties to God, others and myself, to help my fellow man in any circumstances and to faithfully keep the Scout Law.

== See also ==
- Asociación de Guías Scouts de Bolivia
