= Asociación Nacional de Muchachas Guías de Honduras =

Honduras national Guiding organization

- National Girl Guide Association of Honduras
- Country: Honduras
- Founded: 1953
- Membership: 5,484
- Affiliation: World Association of Girl Guides and Girl Scouts
- Website www.guiasdehonduras.wixsite.com/guiasdehonduras

The Asociación Nacional de Muchachas Guías de Honduras (ANMGH; roughly National Girl Guide Association of Honduras) is the national Guiding organization of Honduras. It serves 5,484 members (as of 2006). Founded in 1953, the coeducational organization became an associate member of the World Association of Girl Guides and Girl Scouts in 1981 and a full member in 2002.

== Program and ideals ==
The association is divided in five sections according to age:

- Hormiga (Ant) - ages 4 to 6
- Abeja (Bee) - ages 7 to 10
- Guia Intermedia (Intermediate Guide) - ages 11 to 15
- Guia Mayor (Senior Guide) - ages 16 to 21
- Adultos (Adults) - 21 years and older

The Girl Guide emblem features a pine tree.

=== Guide Promise ===
I promise on my honour, to do my best:
To do my duty to God and my country,
To help other people at all times, and
To obey the Guide Law.

=== Guide Law ===
1. A Guide is a person whose honour is trusted.
2. A Guide is loyal.
3. A Guide's duty is to be useful and to help others.
4. A Guide is a friend to all and a sister to all Guides.
5. A Guide is courteous.
6. A Guide sees in nature the work of God; she protects animals and plants.
7. A Guide obeys orders.
8. A Guide faces difficulties with fortitude and optimism.
9. A Guide is thrifty.
10. A Guide is pure in thoughts, work and deed.

== See also ==
- Asociación de Scouts de Honduras
