= Asociación Nacional de Guías Scouts del Perú =

- National Association of Guide Scouts of Peru
- Headquarters: Zaragoza 131 La Castellana - Surco
- Location: Lima
- Country: Peru
- Founded: 1945
- Membership: 6,100
- President: Ana María Mideros de Burga
- Affiliation: World Association of Girl Guides and Girl Scouts
- Website www.guiascoutsperu.com

The Asociación Nacional de Guías Scouts del Perú (English: National Association of Guide Scouts of Peru) is the national Guiding organization of Peru. It served 6,100 members as of 2010. In 1916, the "Society of Girl Guides" was founded by the first Chief Guide, Elsa Hansen Daranyi. The coeducational organization founded in 1945 became an associate member of the World Association of Girl Guides and Girl Scouts in 1960 and a full member in 1963.

== Program and ideals ==
The association is divided in five sections according to age:

- Giros y Girasoles - ages 4 to 6
- Haditas - ages 7 to 10
- Guías de la Luz - ages 10 to 13
- Guías del Sol - ages 13 to 17
- Guías de Servicio - ages 17 and older

The Girl Guide emblem incorporates elements of the coat of arms of Peru.

=== Guide Promise ===
Prometo por mi honor, hacer todo lo posible;
para cumplir mis deberes para con Dios y mi patria;
ayudar a mis semejantes en todo momento y obedecer la Ley Guía.

=== Guide Law ===
1. Una Guía es responsable y digna de confianza.
2. Una Guía es leal.
3. Una Guía es útil.
4. Una Guía es amiga de todos y hermana de toda Guía.
5. Una Guía es cortés.
6. Una Guía protege a los animales y plantas y ve en la naturaleza la obra de Dios.
7. Una Guía es obediente.
8. Una Guía tiene valor y afronta con optimismo las dificultades.
9. Una Guía hace buen uso de su tiempo y es económica, cuida sus pertenencias y respeta las ajenas.
10. Una Guía es pura de pensamiento, palabra y obra.

== See also ==
- Asociación de Scouts del Perú
