= Association of Scouts of Honduras =

Scout movement of Honduras

- The membership badge of the Asociación de Scouts de Honduras incorporates a shield of the flag of Honduras.
- Membership: 3,031
- Affiliation: World Organization of the Scout Movement
- Website www.scout.org.hn

The Association of Scouts of Honduras (Asociación de Scouts de Honduras in Spanish) (ASH) is the national Scouting organization of Honduras. Scouting was founded in that Central American country in 1952 and became a member of the World Organization of the Scout Movement in 1957. There were 3,031 members as of 2008.

The program emphasis is on community service. Financial assistance from other Scout Associations has helped in the creation of a vocational training center for boys and girls who are taught woodwork, electricity, carpentry, dressmaking and other useful skills.

There are other important programs which include expanding Scouting in schools, conservation training and tree planting.

Scouts participate in community service and have been trained to assist in natural disasters.

== Program ==
- Cachorros (cubs): ages 4 to 5
- Lobatos (cubs): ages 6 to 10
- Scouts: ages 11 to 16
- Rovers: ages 16 to 21

The Scout Motto is Siempre Listo in Spanish, or Always Prepared in English.

The highest rank is the Scout Lempira, named after the 16th century leader of the Lenca people of Central America, who led local resistance against the Spanish conquistadores.

=== Scout Oath ===
Por mi honor y con la gracia de Dios prometo, hacer por cuanto de mi depende por cumplir con mis deberes para con Dios y la patria, ayudar al projimo en toda circunstancia y cumplir fielmente la Ley Scout.

For my honor, I promise to do my best to fulfill my duties to God, others and myself, to help my fellow man in any circumstances and to faithfully keep the Scout Law.

== See also ==
- Asociación Nacional de Muchachas Guías de Honduras
