= Asociación de Guías Scouts de Bolivia =

Girl guide association in Bolivia

- Girl Guide Association of Bolivia
- Country: Bolivia
- Founded: 1958
- Membership: 390
- Affiliation: World Association of Girl Guides and Girl Scouts

The Asociación de Guías Scouts de Bolivia (AGSB, Girl Guide Association of Bolivia) is the national Guiding organization of Bolivia. It serves 390 members (as of 2006). Guiding was introduced to Bolivia in 1915. Founded in 1958, the girls-only organization became an associate member of the World Association of Girl Guides and Girl Scouts in 1966 and a full member in 1978.

== See also ==
- Asociación de Scouts de Bolivia
