= International Scout and Guide Fellowship =

Worldwide organization of adults in support of Scouting and Guiding

- Headquarters: Brussels
- Country: Belgium
- Founded: 1953
- Membership: 55,500 (2016)
- Affiliation: World Association of Girl Guides and Girl Scouts; World Organization of the Scout Movement
- Website; ISGF

The International Scout and Guide Fellowship (ISGF) is a worldwide organization of adults in support of Scouting and Guiding.

The International Scout and Guide Fellowship is open to former members of the World Association of Girl Guides and Girl Scouts (WAGGGS) and the World Organization of the Scout Movement (WOSM), and to other adults who wish to support Scouting.

It was created in 1953 under the name of International Fellowship of Former Scouts and Guides (IFOFSAG).

ISGF is supported by WOSM and WAGGGS, and it has members in 75 countries presently. Furthermore, there are members of Central Branch (individual members or groups) in 32 countries.

In 2013, the 55,500 members celebrated the 60th anniversary of ISGF by carrying out projects to the benefit of communities in which they live and work or worldwide.

== Organization ==
ISGF consists of national Member Organizations called NSGFs (National Scout and Guide Fellowships) and of the members of the Central Branch in countries where there is not yet a NSGF.

=== World Regions ===
==== Africa ====
- Angola
- Benin
- Burkina Faso
- Democratic Republic of the Congo
- Gambia
- Ghana
- Ivory Coast (associate member)
- Nigeria
- Senegal
- Uganda
- Zambia

==== Arab ====
- Algeria
- Bahrain
- Egypt
- Jordan
- Kuwait
- Lebanon
- Libya
- Morocco
- Palestine
- Qatar
- Saudi Arabia
- Tunisia
- United Arab Emirates
- Sudan
- Libya
- Mauritania
- Oman
- Iraq

==== Asia Pacific ====
- Australia
- Bangladesh
- India
- Indonesia
- Malaysia
- Maldives
- Nepal
- New Zealand
- Pakistan
- South Korea
- Sri Lanka

==== Europe ====
Region Europe has 4 regional divisions:

- Nordic Baltic Sub-region
- Western Europe Sub-region
- Central Europe Sub-region
- Southern Sub-Region

===== Central Europe Sub-region =====
- Austria
- Czech Republic
- Estonia
- Germany
- Latvia
- Liechtenstein
- Poland
- Romania
- Slovakia
- Slovenia
- Switzerland

===== Nordic Baltic Sub-region =====
- Denmark
- Finland
- Iceland
- Lithuania
- Norway
- Sweden

===== Southern Sub-region =====
- Cyprus
- France
- Greece
- Italy
- Portugal
- Spain
- South (French speaking) Switzerland
- Turkey

===== Western Europe Sub-region =====
- Belgium
- France
- Ireland
- Luxembourg
- Netherlands
- United Kingdom - National Scout & Guide Fellowship UK

==== Western Hemisphere ====
- Argentina
- Brazil
- Chile
- Curaçao
- Guatemala
- Haiti
- Mexico
- Panama
- Peru
- Suriname
- Trinidad and Tobago
- Venezuela

=== Central Branch ===
Groups and/or individuals in the following countries:

- Aruba
- Botswana
- Burundi intends to join ISGF as a full member
- Cambodia
- Cameroon
- Canada
- Cape Verde
- Colombia
- Congo Brazzaville
- Costa Rica
- Cuba
- Ecuador
- El Salvador
- Grenada
- Hong Kong
- Israel
- Japan
- Kenya
- Malawi
- Philippines
- Rwanda
- Singapore
- South Africa
- Sudan
- Taiwan (ROC)
- Tanzania
- Thailand
- Togo
- Uruguay

- United States of America
- Zimbabwe

=== International Ambassadors Guild ===
This Guild, founded in 1997, is a foundation to support Scouting and Guiding worldwide.

== See also ==
- Scout Fellowship (UK)
- Baden-Powell Guild (Australia)
