= Grossmann Jet Service =

G-JET

- Hawker 900XP
IATA	ICAO	Call sign
-	GSJ	GROSSJET
- Founded: 2004
- Hubs: Václav Havel Airport Prague
- Fleet size: 2
- Headquarters: Prague, Czech Republic
- Key people: Dagmar Grossmann
- Website: http://www.grossmannjet.com

G-Jet s.r.o., formerly known as Grossmann Jet Service, is a private jet operator based in Prague, Czech Republic. The company provides executive charter services, as well as aircraft management and brokerage. Its main base is Vaclav Havel Airport, Prague. The company slogan is Excellence in every detail.

== History ==
G-Jet was set up in 2004. The company offers executive charter flights all around the world, aircraft management, brokerage and consultancy.

== Fleet ==
G-Jet fleet includes the following aircraft (as of December 2012):

- 1 × Hawker 900XP, max 8 passengers OK-KAZ
- 1 × Gulfstream 550, max 13 passengers OK-KKF
