= Australian Imperial Boy Scouts =

Boy Scout organization

- Country: Australia
- Founded: 1909
- Defunct: 1932

Australian Imperial Boy Scouts (AIBS) was a Boy Scout organization that formed from the merger of the Australian Boy Scouts into the Imperial Boy Scouts lasting from 1912 until 1932.

== History ==
In 1909 the Imperial Boy Scouts (IBS) formed while the Australian Boy Scouts (ABS) were founded in 1910. Most troops formed in Victoria were joined up with the IBS or ABS.

The IBS Victoria Section requested in September 1911 that the Minister of Defence allow IBS troops to undergo military cadet training under military supervision, but were denied as being a voluntary association.

By 1912, the IBS and ABS merged into the Australian Imperial Boy Scouts. In 1912, the Gippsland Boy Scout Association was formed and affiliated with the AIBS.

On 31 August 1932, the AIBS signed an agreement with the Boy Scouts' Association of Australia to merge.
