= British Boy Scouts and British Girl Scouts Association =

Early Scout organisation

British Boy Scouts & British Girl Scouts
- BBS emblem
- Headquarters: Berkshire
- Location: United Kingdom
- Country: United Kingdom
- Founded: 1908; 24 May 1909 reconstituted as national organisation
- Founder: Major W.G. Whitby
- Chief Commissioner: Paul Stevens
- Grand Scout: David Cooksley
- Affiliation: World Scouts
- Website; BBS & BGS Association

The British Boy Scouts and British Girl Scouts Association (BBS & BGS) is an early Scout organisation, having begun in 1908 as the Battersea Boy Scouts. The organisation was renamed as the British Boy Scouts and launched as a national organisation on 24 May 1909. In association with other Scout organisations, the BBS formed the National Peace Scouts in 1910. The BBS instigated the first international Scout organisation, the World Scouts in 1911.

== History ==
=== British Boy Scouts ===
The Oath 1909

I will do my duty as a Scout, to my God, my King, and my Country. I will be loyal to the B.B.S., and will keep its laws.

— Chums 1909
Scout Pledge

On my honour I will Love God; Honour the Queen; Respect all. On my honour I will, without fear or reward, protect the weak, defend the helpless, and assist my neighbour. On my honour I will live by the Scout Law.

— The Constitution of the BBS & BGS Association

The British Boy Scouts was founded in 1908 as the Battersea Boy Scouts, a local association of Scout troops. The Battersea Boy Scouts later briefly registered with Baden-Powell's Boy Scouts organisation but, in 1909, withdrew and reconstituted as the British Boy Scouts (BBS), out of a concern that Baden-Powell's organisation was too bureaucratic and militaristic and too closely associated with commercial interests. Initially, the BBS was led by Major W. G. Whitby as Chief Commissioner and its main financier. Assisting were Colonel Frederick Charles Keyser, president and H. Moore, secretary. The BBS was launched as a national organisation on Empire Day, 24 May 1909.

The BBS was given publicity by Cassell and Company, publisher of CHUMS, who had previously developed their own 'CHUMS league of Scouts' with the CHUMS Scout Patrols. The Chuma Scouts were formed by the readers of the CHUMS boy's newspaper, in response to an invitation from the editor for boys to form their own patrols. Cassell merged their Scout patrols with the BBS and published a weekly BBS page from June 1909 until mid-1911.

On 11 September 1907, CHUMS' "On the Watch Tower" news column reported that Robert Baden-Powell's Brownsea Island Scout encampment was proposed and his recommendation that Boy Scout groups should be formed. Readers were interested in forming Scout groups and the editorial staff initially supported this move, indicating that Baden-Powell would be consulted. The CHUMS Scouts would wear the 'Chums' League badge. The CHUMS newspaper was distributed throughout the British Empire and CHUMS Scout Patrols formed in the UK and Australia 1908. Due to Baden-Powell's contract with his publisher, C. Arthur Pearson Limited, CHUMS, a rival paper, was denied rights to publish the Scout scheme. Later, CHUMS indicated that there would be a CHUMS Legion of Scouts, formed from the CHUMS Scout Patrols to be announced later. Instead, in May 1909, CHUMS announced the launch of British Boy Scouts and that it would be the official BBS journal.

Sir Francis Vane was appointed as the first London Commissioner of the Baden-Powell Boy Scouts organisation. Vane believed that the Scouts should be non-military and through mediation, reconciled the BBS with the B–P organisation, by having the BBS as an affiliated organisation. Baden-Powell appointed members of the National Service League, a pro-military group, to his headquarters. With Vane pushing for a more democratic organisation, his position was eliminated by Baden-Powell's headquarter staff. In a protest meeting, London Scoutmasters voted overwhelming in support of Vane. Baden-Powell promised to reinstate Vane but never did so. On 3 December 1909, Vane accepted the presidency of the British Boy Scouts taking most London area Scout troops with him. The Quakers' Birmingham and Midland Troops also followed, as Vane had been a key influence in getting the Quakers to sponsor Scout Troops.

The BBS Law 1909

1. A Scout must be honourable, truthful, and reliable.

2. A Scout must not use bad or indecent language.

3. A Scout must not smoke until he is eighteen years of age.

4. A Scout must not quarrel or give offence.

5. A Scout must help others freely whenever he can, and be a brother to all other Scouts.

6. A Scout must be polite and obliging to all.

7. A Scout must be a friend to animals.

8. A Scout must obey all orders from his officers at once.

9. A Scout must always be cheerful, and never grumble.

10. A Scout must always be self-reliant and thrifty.

— Chums 1909
Scout Law

1. A Scout is honourable, truthful and reliable.
2. A Scout is loyal to the Queen, his/her Country, his/her Parents, his/her Officers and to comrades high and low.
3. A Scout is helpful to others, whatever it may cost him/her.
4. A Scout is a friend to all and a brother/sister to all Scouts.
5. A Scout is courteous to all.
6. A Scout is kind to animals.
7. A Scout is obedient and follows orders from his/her Parents and Officers promptly.
8. A Scout is cheerful and takes trouble with a trusting grace.
9. A Scout is self reliant and a good steward of his/her possessions.
10. A Scout is upright in his/her conduct.

— The Constitution of the BBS & BGS Association

With the spread of the alternative British Boy Scouts program throughout the world via the CHUMS publication and Vane's efforts, on 1 May 1911, the various Scout organisations were aligned as the legion of World Scouts, the first international Scout organisation. In November 1911, the World Scouts launched its fraternal Order of World Scouts (OWS).

By mid-1911, the original organisers had left the BBS, losing the organisation sponsorship from CHUMS. Vane put his wealth behind the organisation, providing a London headquarters and financed the organisation, including the manufacture of BBS uniforms. This overburdened his finances to the point of him being declared bankrupt. Thus the British Boy Scouts and the World Scouts lost their headquarters, source of equipment and uniforms and their leader, Sir Francis Vane. By the end of 1912 Captain Masterman, then Assistant Grand Scoutmaster – Britain, led Troops and Junior Troops in joining The Boy Scouts Association while in 1913 some troops were led by Mr. Barrow Cadbury to join the Boys' Life Brigade (BLB), becoming the BLB Scouts. This left about 100 Troops under the new Grand Scoutmaster, Albert Jones Knighton. Vane kept in contact, and in 1915, home from leave from his duties for the Army in Ireland, inspected a Troop under London Commissioner, Percy Herbert Pooley. Under Knighton and Pooley, the BBS & BGS became a definite Christian association.

Junior Scout Law

1. A Junior Scout respects his/her Parents and his/her Officers;
2. A Junior Scout respects himself/herself.

— The Constitution of the BBS & BGS Association

The UK Parliament had a bill in 1921 before it to restrict use of "Boy Scout" and Scout uniform and Badges to The Boy Scouts Association but the measure failed. In 1926, a broader bill to protect all chartered associations was passed but with an amendment clause by Herbert Dunnico, a Labour MP and a BBS Scoutmaster, that exempted any 'bona fide national organisation' from the Act, such as the British Boy Scouts. Knighton had resigned without waiting for the outcome of the legislation and formed "the British Boy Sentinels", a non-Scout organisation. Pooley took over as Chief Commissioner of the BBS with Lord Alington as Grand Scoutmaster. Some independent Scout troops from Shoreditch, East Ham and Lewisham, formerly registered with The Boy Scouts Association, allied with the BBS until 1932, forming 'The Independent Scout Alliance'. From 1926, some Boys' Life Brigade Companies affiliated with the BBS as the 'Young Life Pioneers' when the Boys' Life Brigade merged with the Boys' Brigade. Sir Francis Vane, tried to reconcile the BBS with The Boy Scouts Association after returning from Italy in 1927. This failed due to a lack of positive response from the B–P HQ who required the BBS to disband and troops and individuals apply in the normal way – without any reassurance as to the acceptance of units.

=== Brotherhood of British Scouts ===
By the 1930s, the Young Life Pioneers had either joined the Boys' Brigade or became BBS Troops. About 40 BBS troops existed in the 1930s, mostly sponsored by Free Churches. With reduced membership and lacking a parliamentarian supporter, The Boy Scout Association sought to use The Chartered Associations (Protection of Names and Uniforms) Act to stop the BBS from using the term "Boy Scouts", which prompted a change in name to "The Brotherhood of British Scouts" to avoid any further legal action. In response, some Yorkshire and Nottinghamshire troops under the assistant chief commissioner, W. Hanley broke off from the main group and continued using "British Boy Scouts" for about a year, only to return.

The World War II call up of scoutmasters and youth evacuations reduced the BBS to 8 Troops. This decrease continued into the 1950s when only 6 Troops existed; 1st Lewisham (St Stephen's) Loampit Hill (under Charles A Brown, Assistant Chief Commissioner), 1st Wimbledon (Samuel Manning, Grand Scoutmaster) 1st Cirencester (Pooley, Chief Commissioner), 1st Stroud (Pooley, Chief Commissioner), 1st Beckingham, and 1st Huddersfield. By 1971, Brown was Chief Commissioner and led the lone BBS Troop in Lewisham, South London.

=== British Boy Scouts (1979–2009) ===
The St Stephens House Rover Crew in Oxford, led by Michael Foster, joined the BBS in 1979. The Oxford Rover Crew became officially "The Oxford University Rover Crew", With members leaving Oxford and settling elsewhere, this resulted in additional BBS groups in the 1980s. In 1983, the Reverend Michael Foster (who by that time was a Parish Priest in the Church of England, Vicar of Holy Trinity Clifton, Nottingham) was appointed Chief Commissioner by Charles Brown, who went on to become Grand Scoutmaster. Other groups joined up with the British Boy Scouts: in 1985, 1st Waltham Forest, an Independent Scout Group, and in 1988 the Outlanders association. Several Troops which left the Baden-Powell Scouts' Association under the Banner of the Ex Deputy Area commission Ray O'Donnell-Hampton. joined up with the BBS in 1990s.

The re-expansion of the World Scouts began in the early 1980s with membership in the USA State of Hawaii, and then in 1990s with appointments of a BBS Commissioner for Australia in 1991 and a Chief Commissioner of BBS & BGS in Canada in 1999.

In January 1993, Ted Scott, a friend of Pooley and long time BBS member, became the Grand Scoutmaster following the death of Charles Brown in November 1992 and served seven years becoming the first Grand Scout Emeritus when Dr Michael Foster replaced him. Ted Scott died after being ill on 3 March 2009, after serving 83 years in the BBS. David Cooksley replaced Dr Michael Foster as the Chief Commissioner.

== British Girl Scouts ==
Girl Scouts were a part of the British Boy Scouts from the start. With a public outcry over girls in the Scouts, the British Boy Scouts launched the British Girl's Nursing Corps (BGNC) under a Scout mistress reporting to the BBS executive and becoming a separate organisation with a journal ("The British Girl Nurse") in June 1910. Vane however had other ideas and allowed girls to continue as Girl Scouts and brought whole Troops of girls with him from The Boy Scout Association. Many Girl Scouts did not wish to become Guides under the BSA scheme. Both the British Girl Scouts and the British Girl's Nursing Corps became members of the World Scouts. The latter was disassociated from the British Boy Scouts and the British Girl Scouts remain as their counterpart.

== British Boy Scouts in Australia ==
Chums Scout Patrols started forming in 1908 in Australia due to the circulation there of the Chums publication for boys. Troops under the British Boy Scouts (BBS) program began operations in 1909. In 1910, Chums Scout Patrols merged with the BBS. Australia activities continued until the 1930s while members continued to exist in the organisation. The Independent Australian Scouts, a new organisation was found in 1986 and became affiliate and successor to British Boy Scouts in Australia. Several Scoutmasters joined the BBS from The Boy Scouts Association Queensland Branch with an attempt at reconciliation in 1911. A single Brisbane troop existed there until after 1921.

== British Boy Scouts in South Africa ==
E. P. Carter turned his Boys Guides' Brigade, founded in 1902 into the South African (SA) British Boy Scouts (BBS). The Boys Guide Brigade was found by Carter in 1902. With the turmoil after 1912, the SA BBS rebuffed Baden-Powell's effort to have them join The Boy Scout Association instead renaming themselves Naval Cadets.

== Elsewhere ==
The British Boy Scouts were also organised in Canada, New Zealand, India, Creillos, South America and Egypt. All of these were original members of the World Scouts. Most lost most or all of their members during the First World War. The British Boy Scouts was reintroduced into New Zealand During September 2015.

== Chums Scout Patrols ==
Chums Scout Patrols
- Owner: Cassell and Company
- Headquarters: London
- Country: UK
- Founded: 1908
- Defunct: 1909
- Founders: Cassell and Company
	Next; British Boy Scouts

Chums Scout Patrols (also Chums Legion of Scouts or Chums League of Scouts) were an early organisation of Scouting in the United Kingdom. It was formed by the readers of the Chums boys' newspaper, in response to an invite from the Editor for boys to form their own patrols.

=== History ===
Chums "On the Watch Tower" news column reported on 11 September 1907 that Robert Baden-Powell's Brownsea Island Scouting encampment was proposed and his recommendation that Boy Scout groups should be formed. Readers were interested in forming Scouting groups and the editor staff initially support this move, indicate that Baden-Powell would be consulted, and that Chums Scouts should wear the 'Chums' League badge. The Chums newspaper reach in the British Empire and thus Chums Scout Patrols formed in Australia in 1908. With Baden-Powell arrangement with his publisher, Pearson, Chums was denied the rights to publish the Scout scheme in what was a rival paper. Later, Chums indicated that there would be a Chums Legion of Scouts formed from the Chums Scout Patrols to be announced later. Instead Chums announced the launch of British Boy Scouts (BBS) and that it would be the official BBS journal in May 1909.

== See also ==
- Order of World Scouts
- Sir Francis Vane
- Chums (paper)
