= Baden-Powell's Scout training scheme =

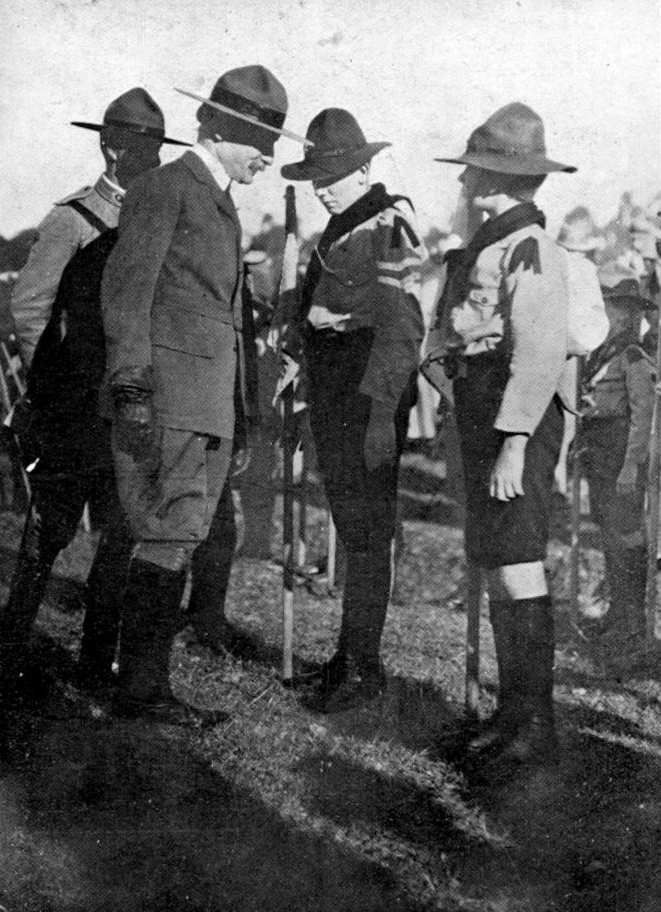
Sir Robert Baden-Powell talking to Boy Scouts in Brisbane during a tour of Australia in 1911

Baden-Powell's Scout training scheme was a progressive series of tests for Boy Scouts, in skills which the founder of the Scout Movement believed would be useful in building character and good citizenship.

== Background ==
Robert Baden-Powell tested his ideas on boys' citizenship training in 1907 with an experimental camp on Brownsea Island, and in the following year, published Scouting for Boys in fortnightly instalments. Originally intended as a programme for leaders of other youth organisations to utilise, however independent Scout patrols were formed spontaneously across the United Kingdom. Baden-Powell's response was to establish a structured organisation, including tests for ranks which would enable boys to mark their proficiency in the various Scouting skills.

== Scout badges ==
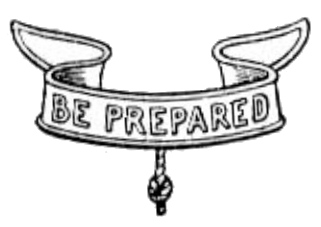
The insignia of a Second Class Scout

=== Tenderfoot Scout ===
The Tenderfoot Test was the test that a boy, originally aged between 12 and 18 years old, would have to pass before he could make his Scout Promise and become an invested member of the Scout Troop. To become a Tenderfoot, a boy had to prove that he: knew the Scout Law and Promise, knew the Scout sign and salute, knew the composition of, and how to fly the Union Jack, and could tie six specified knots and knew their uses. The Tenderfoot Badge was the Scout fleur-de-lys emblem, embroidered on cloth and worn on the left pocket of the uniform shirt. A small brass badge was provided for wear in a lapel buttonhole when not in uniform.

=== Second Class Scout ===
To become a Second Class Scout, a boy had to: have been a Tenderfoot for at least one month, have a knowledge of basic first aid and how to tie bandages, know the Semaphore or Morse code alphabet, follow a track for half a mile within 25 minutes, travel a mile using "Scout's pace" (alternate walking and running) in 12 minutes, build and light a camp fire using only two matches, cook meat and potatoes over an open fire, have at least sixpence in a bank account, and know the sixteen points of the compass. The Second Class Badge was a depiction of a scroll bearing the Scout motto, "Be Prepared". It was worn on the left upper sleeve.

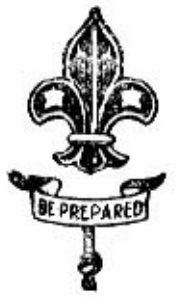
The insignia of a First Class Scout

=== First Class Scout ===
The tests for a First Class Scout were: swim 50 yards, send and receive a message in Semaphore or Morse at a specified rate of letters per minute, go on a fourteen-mile expedition over two days, by foot, boat or canoe and write a report on returning, know how to deal with a wide range of specified accidents and know the correct first aid techniques to use, using an open fire, know how to cook items from a list that included skinning a rabbit and gutting a fish, also be able to make "damper" (bread cooked in the embers of a fire), know map symbols, draw a sketch map and take a compass bearing, use an axe, estimate distances, area and capacity to within 25% error, and finally train another boy in the Tenderfoot skills so that he passes the test. The First Class Badge was a Scout emblem above the Second Class Badge.

=== King's Scout ===
To become a King's Scout, a First Class Scout had to complete four proficiency badges from a specified list that covered core Scouting skills to a high standard.

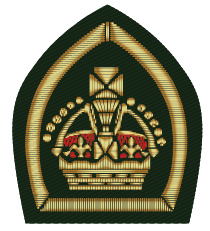
The insignia of a King's Scout, UK and the British Empire, 1919.

== Later developments ==
Scouting quickly spread to other countries and territories, both within the British Empire and outside of it. In these countries, Baden-Powell's scheme was adapted to suit local conditions. In the United Kingdom Boy Scouts' Association, there were several amendments to the scheme before it was replaced on the recommendation of the 1966 Advance Party Report, which said that "The worst condemnation of the present training Scheme is the fact that more than half of those who join the Movement never progress beyond the Tenderfoot stage". The proposal for a new three stage scheme in which Scouts could progress rapidly in the early stages was adopted by the Association and began to be implemented in October 1967. A number of Scout Groups that were dissatisfied with this and other restructuring formed the Baden-Powell Scouts' Association in 1970 and continue with an updated version of Baden-Powell's scheme to the present day.

The training scheme of Scouts BSA, although thoroughly adapted and modernised, retains the structure of Tenderfoot, Second Class and First Class Scout devised by the founder.
