= Pathfinder Scouts Association =

Traditional British scouting association

Pathfinder & Rover Explorer Scouts' Association
- Country: United Kingdom
- Founded: 1982
- Founder: Ray O'Donnell-Hampton
- Chief Commissioner: Adrian McDowell
- Website https://rolandphilippsrovercrew.weebly.com/

The Pathfinder & Rover Explorer Scouts' Association (P-RESA) is an independent Traditional Scouting Association in the United Kingdom, with International branches. The Association's training programme runs along the lines of Baden-Powell's original Scouting for Boys, upholding the traditions and practices set out by B-P, using the 1938 Boy Scouts' Association Policy Organisation & Rules (POR) as its basis.

== The Crossed Arrows ==
Along with the Fleur-de-Lis, the arrow has been a long used symbol within Scouting.

The British Boy Scouts used the arrow symbol as an important part of their badges. In the Gloucestershire Chronicle dated 19 November 1910, Capt.L.C.Hobbs, The BBS Gloucester Commissioner, gave the following response when asked why every BBS badge has an arrow running through it:

"An arrow, forms an important part in the British Boy Scout badges, because an arrow is used for indicating direction; and, as this the duty of a Scout, the arrow is an appropriate symbol. An arrow is also straight and true: sharp and quick-qualities all Scouts should possess."

At the 1929 World Jamboree in Arrowe Park, Baden-Powell presented four Golden Arrows to representatives from the four corners of the Globe, saying "Carry it fast and carry it far".

In modern heraldry, crossed arrows have come to represent friendship, peace, unity, and cooperation.

It is for these very reasons, that we use the crossed arrows within our association.

== Organisation ==
=== Sections ===
Section	Ages
Beavers	6–8
Wolf Cubs	8–11
Pathfinder Scouts	11–18
Rover Explorer Scouts	18+

== Beavers ==
Beavers are the youngest and newest section in Scouting, although some Groups do not operate Beaver colonies as they were not part of Baden-Powell's original concept. Beavers was one of the initial names Baden-Powell considered for the Wolf Cub section. The programme serves six to eight year olds, and is based on the Canadian Beaver Scout handbook Friends of the Forest.

=== Beaver Law and Oath ===
The Beaver Oath is:

I promise to do my best,
to obey my Leaders and my parents
to love God and to be a good Otter.

The Beaver Law is:

A Beaver is always busy and bright
is a friend to all and helps other people
by doing a good turn every day.

Motto: "Beavers" - Always Busy and Bright

=== Beaver Uniform ===
- Cap: Grey, with pale blue piping, with Beaver's head badge in front.
- Scarf: Of the Group colour, worn with a Group ring (of one pattern, other than the 'Gilwell) or a loose knot at the throat.
- Jersey: Grey, sleeves down or rolled up at the discretion of the B.S.M.
- Shorts: Dark grey.
- Stockings: Dark blue; worn turned down below the knees, with green tabbed garter showing outside.
- Boots or shoes: Brown or black.
- Shoulder patch: Small triangular path of cloth (the colour of the Lodge), sewn at the top of left sleeve, immediately below the shoulder, with point upwards.
- Shoulder badge: Indicating the Group, worn on right shoulder or on both, according to the custom of the Group.
- County emblem: Worn on the right breast.
- District emblem: Worn on the right sleeve below the shoulder badge.

=== Beaver Proficiency Badges ===
The general scheme of Beaver proficiency badges is as follows:-

Four special proficiency badges;

- Brown Paw Print Badge
- Blue Paw Print Badge
- Green Paw Print Badge
- Red Paw Print Badge

Two additional proficiency badges;

- Beaver Safety
- Swimming Beaver

== Wolf Cubs ==
In 1916, Lord Baden-Powell set up Wolf Cubs for the younger brothers of the Scouts who were desperate to join in the fun. Wolf Cubs are based around Rudyard Kipling's Jungle Book. Where a young boy brought up by a Wolf pack has to learn to develop to be a self sufficient man. Leaders take their names from the Jungle Book story.

=== Wolf Cub Law and Oath ===
The Wolf Cub Oath is:

I promise to do my best,
To do my duty to God and the King,
To keep the Law of the Wolf Pack, and do a good turn to somebody every day.

The Law of the Wolf Cub Pack is:

The Cub gives in to the Old Wolf;
The Cub does not give in to himself.

Motto: "Wolf Cubs" - Do my Best

=== Wolf Cub Uniform ===
- Cap: Green, with yellow piping, with Wolf's head badge in front.
- Scarf: Of the Group colour, worn with a Group ring (of one pattern, other than the 'Gilwell) or a loose knot at the throat. Ends to be tied with a 'Reef' Knot.
- Jersey: Green, sleeves down or rolled up at the discretion of the C.M.
- Shorts: Dark grey.
- Stockings: Dark blue; worn turned down below the knees, with green tabbed garter showing outside.
- Boots or shoes: Brown or black.
- Shoulder patch: Small triangular path of cloth (the colour of the Six), sewn at the top of left sleeve, immediately below the shoulder, with point upwards.
- Shoulder badge: Indicating the Group, worn on right shoulder or on both, according to the custom of the Group.
- County emblem: Worn on the right breast.
- District emblem: Worn on the right sleeve below the shoulder badge.

=== Wolf Cub Proficiency Badges ===
The general scheme of Cub proficiency badges is as follows:-

Two general proficiency badges;

- One Star Cub
- Two Star Cub

12 special proficiency badges for different subjects divided into four groups as follows:-

(1) Character (colour of badge - blue);

- Collector
- Observer
- Gardener

(2) Handcraft (colour of badge - yellow);

- Artist
- Homecraft
- Toymaker

(3) Service (colour of badge - red)

- First Aider
- Guide
- House Orderly

(4) Physical Health (colour of badge - green)

- Athlete
- Swimmer
- Team Player

One additional proficiency badge, based on the holding of certain special proficiency badges

- Leaping Wolf

== Pathfinder Scouts ==
In 1906 and 1907 Robert Baden-Powell, a lieutenant general in the British Army, wrote a book for boys about reconnaissance and scouting. Baden-Powell wrote Scouting for Boys (London, 1908), based on his earlier books about military scouting, with influence and support of Frederick Russell Burnham (Chief of Scouts in British Africa), Ernest Thompson Seton of the Woodcraft Indians, William Alexander Smith of the Boys' Brigade, and his publisher Pearson. In the summer of 1907 Baden-Powell held a camp on Brownsea Island in England to test ideas for his book. This camp and the publication of Scouting for Boys are generally regarded as the start of the Scout movement.

The movement employs the Scout method, a program of informal education with an emphasis on practical outdoor activities, including camping, woodcraft, aquatics, hiking, backpacking, and sports.

=== Pathfinder Scout Law and Oath ===
The Pathfinder Scout Law and Oath are derived from the original Scout Law and Scout Oath:

=== The Scout Law ===
1. A Scouts' honour is to be trusted.
2. A Scout is loyal to The King, His Country, His Scouters, His Parents, His Employers and to those under Him.
3. A Scouts' duty is to be useful and help others.
4. A Scout is a friend to all, and a brother to every other Scout, no matter to what Country, Class or Creed the other may belong.
5. A Scout is courteous.
6. A Scout is kind to animals.
7. A Scout obeys the orders of his parents, Patrol Leader, or Scout Master without question.
8. A Scout smiles and whistles in all difficulties.
9. A Scout is thrifty
10. A Scout is clean in thought, word and deed.

It is perhaps rather difficult to remember the different heads of the law. The following is easily learned and is a good way of memorising the headings:

Trusty, loyal and helpful,
Brotherly, courteous, kind,
Obedient, smiling and thrifty,
Pure as the rustling wind.

=== The Pathfinder Scout Oath ===
On my honour I promise that I will do my best
To do my duty to God and the King,
To help other people at all times,
To obey the Scout Law.

Motto:"Pathfinder Scouts" - Be Prepared.

=== Pathfinder Scout Uniform ===
The uniform worn by members of the P-RESA reflects that worn by Scouts prior to the publication of the Chief Scouts' Advance Party Report by The Scout Association in 1967.

- Hat: Khaki hat (four dents), leather band round crown, and lace worn at the back of head and tied on the brim of the hat.
- Scarf: Of the Group colour, worn with a Group ring (of one pattern, other than the 'Gilwell) or a loose knot at the throat.
- Shirt: Khaki, with two patch pockets (buttoned), and shoulder straps.
- Shorts: Dark Blue.
- Belt: Brown leather or web
- Stockings: Dark Blue, worn turned down below the knee with green tabbed garter showing on the outside.
- Boots or shoes: Brown or black.
- Shoulder knot: Llama braid six inches long, half an inch wide, of Patrol colours, on left shoulder.
- Shoulder badge: Indicating the Group, worn on right shoulder or on both, according to the custom of the Group.
- County emblem: Worn on the right breast.
- District emblem: Worn on the right sleeve below the shoulder badge.
- Staff: Every Pathfinder, including a Sea Pathfinder, should be equipped with a natural wood staff, marked in feet and inches, to be carried on all appropriate occasions.

=== Pathfinder Scout Proficiency Badges ===
The general scheme for Pathfinder proficiency badges is as follows:-

Two general proficiency badges

- Second Class
- First Class

44 special proficiency badges for different subjects as follows The badges, the tests for which are marked with an asterisk must be repassed annually. Those marked with † denote public service badges:-

- Airman
- Ambulance*†
- Artist
- Athlete
- Backwoodsman
- Boatman
- Canoeist
- Camper
- Civil Defence†
- Climber
- Coast Watchman†
- Cook
- Cyclist†
- Electrician
- Entertainer
- Explorer†
- Fireman†
- Fisherman
- Forester
- Handyman†
- Healthyman†
- Interpreter*†
- Marksman
- Master-at-Arms
- Missioner†
- Musician (includes Bugler and Piper)
- Naturalist
- Oarsman
- Pathfinder*
- Pilot†
- Pioneer
- Public Health Man†
- Quartermaster
- Rescuer*
- Rigger
- Signaller*†
- Stalker
- Starman
- Surveyor
- Swimmer
- Tracker
- Weatherman
- Wirelessman
- World Friendship

Three additional proficiency badges, based on the holding of certain special proficiency badges

- Scout Crown Award
- All Round Cords
- Bushman's Thong

== Sea Pathfinder Scouts ==
In addition to the Pathfinder Scout Law, Oath and Motto, Sea Pathfinder Scouts have a motto, promise, special proficiency badges and additional proficiency badge of their own of their own:

=== Sea Pathfinder Scouts Promise ===
As a Sea Pathfinder Scout I promise to do my best --

1. To guard against water accidents
2. To know the location and proper use of the life saving equipment on every vessel I board
3. To be prepared to help those in peril on the sea
4. To seek to preserve the Motto of the Sea, "Women and Children First."

=== Sea Pathfinder Scouts Uniform ===
- Cap: Bluejacket's cap (with white cover from 1 May to 30 September) with ribbon inscribed "Sea Pathfinder Scouts" or, if desired, in the case of Groups operating on inland waters, the words "Pathfinder Scouts".
- Shirt or jersey: Dark blue. Jerseys with the words "Sea Pathfinder Scouts" in white letters across the chest; or shirts or jerseys with an anchor badge on the right breast. Groups wearing the words "Pathfinder Scouts" on cap ribbons will wear a blue jersey or shirt with an anchor badge in either case.
- Shorts: Dark blue.
- Belt: To be worn either underneath or outside the jersey, whichever is the practice of the Group.
- Stockings: Dark blue.
- Boots or shoes: Brown or black.

Motto: "Sea Pathfinder Scouts" - Our Best Today For a Better Tomorrow

=== Sea Pathfinder Scout Proficiency Badges ===
Three special proficiency badges

- Gold Anchor
- White Anchor
- Red Anchor

One additional proficiency badge, based on the holding of certain special proficiency badges

- Sea Scout Crown Award (Seaman's badge)

== Air Pathfinder Scouts ==
There is no Aviation branch within The Pathfinder & Rover Explorer Scouts’ Association.

In the July 1932 edition of the Scouter, Lord Robert Baden-Powell wrote:

"...it has been suggested that Air Scouts should be organised in the same way as Sea Scouts."
"Though the air is 'ever with us', access to aerodromes is not common and though Sea Scouts can mess about 'in any old boat', a Scout is unlikely to be able to get access to an aeroplane, and even if he did he would not be able to fly it. ...it seems hardly feasible to have special 'Air Scouts', yet a great deal may be accomplished by troops specialising in air-work... I shall always be pleased to give what advice I can."

== Rover Explorer Scouts ==
Rover Scouts, Rovers, Rover Scouting or Rovering is a service program associated with Scouting for men and women, with no upper age limit. A group of Rovers is called a 'Rover Crew'.

The Rover program was originated by The Boy Scouts' Association in the United Kingdom in 1918 to provide a program for young men who had grown up beyond the age range of the Boy Scouts.

=== Rover Explorer Scouts' Law and Oath ===
Rover Explorer Scouts use the same Law and Oath as Pathfinder Scouts.

Motto: "Rover Explorer Scouts " - Service.

=== Rover Explorer Scouts Uniform ===
A Rover Explorer Scout wears uniform as for a Pathfinder Scout, but with the following differences:-

- Shoulder knot: Red, yellow and green.
- Garter tabs: Red.
- Thumbstick: In place of staff.
- Shoulder straps: Green, with Pathfinder badge, with the word "Rovers" below.

=== Rover Explorer Sea Scouts Uniform ===
A Rover Explorer Sea Scout wears uniform as for a Sea Pathfinder Scout, but with the following difference:-

- Cap: With ribbon inscribed "Rover Sea Explorer Scouts" or, if desired, in the case of Groups operating on inland waters, the words "Rover Explorer Scouts."
- Shoulder knot: Red, yellow and green.
- Garter tabs: Red.
- Thumbstick: In place of staff.
- Shoulder straps: Green, with Pathfinder badge, with the word "Rovers" below.

=== Rover Explorer Scouts Proficiency Badges ===
Why do Rovers have badges? The P-RESA Rover Scout training programme was designed to run in conjunction with the Traditional Woodbadge (Leader) Training Scheme and Charge Certificate Scheme (Activity Permits). Adults earn awards to demonstrate their achievements. The scheme enables individuals who have never been in Scouting/Guiding the opportunity to learn and experience Scouting first hand, as well as preparing individuals for leadership roles.

The general scheme for Rover Explorer Scouts proficiency badges is as follows (badges followed by * denote public service badges):-

Five general proficiency badges

- Progress Badge
- Rambler's Badge
- Rover Instructor Badge
- Scoutcraft Star
- Service Training Star

14 special proficiency badges for different subjects as follows;

- Community Resilience*
- Master Air Observer*
- Master Backwoodsman
- Master Camp Crewman
- Master Canoeist
- Master Cartographer
- Master Cook
- Master Explorer*
- Master First Aider*
- Master Pioneer
- Master Quartermaster
- Master Rescuer*
- Master Signaller*
- Master Swimmer

Four additional proficiency badges, based on the holding of certain special proficiency badges

- A1 Rover Scout Cord
- B-P Award
- Roland Philipps Challenge Award
- Rover Scout Crown Award

== Outlanders Oath ==
Overseas members residing in the UK or non-Christians may take the Outlanders Oath:

On my honour I promise that I will do my best
To do my duty to the Country in which I live,
To help other people at all times.
To obey the Scout Law.

Members who have taken the Outlanders Oath, wear the Outlanders Badge.

== History ==
=== 1982 - 2003 ===
The 'Explorer Scouts' and 'Pathfinder Scouts Association' had been a combined independent Scout organisation from 1982 and registered as a youth organisation in Fulham, London. under the educational Charity Status of 'Walham Green Youth Council'. In the 1980s the members of The 'Explorer Scouts' and 'Pathfinder Scouts Association' joined the Baden Powell Scouts Association. In early 1992, some of the PSA leaders who had been members of Baden-Powell Scouts' Association (B-PSA) joined the British Boy Scouts (BBS). After failing to gain agreement on many issues to do with traditional scouting, these members left the BBS group and set up 'The British Pathfinder Scouts Association (BPSA), which incorporated an adult section dealing with the training and building up of good leadership through the 'Rover Explorer Scout Association'. The new Association was registered as a Charity at Law in September 1993, leaving behind the older name 'Explorer Scouts'.

In 1995 the founding and Chief Commissioners of the BPSA were Ray O'Donnell-Hampton and Steven Dudley-Coventry. After much disagreement about the quality of Scouting tradition, Ray O'Donnell-Hampton handed in his warrant and left the BPSA. The number of groups fell after the death of Dudley-Coventry and the BPSA's 'Scoutmasters Court of Honour' dissolved its charitable status without consultation with commissioners past or present. The BPSA was then officially wound up in April 1998, with the remaining badges being passed on, again without any consultation, to the British Boy Scouts.

In 1999 Ray O'Donnell-Hampton and some of the older members of the previous association met and re-established the Pathfinder Scouts Association which was registered as a Charity in October 2003 under the umbrella of the 'Rover Explorer Scouts Association' (RESA).

The Association quickly began to regain membership and had connections with new members and groups including many lone Scouts' from around the world. There are membership, affiliations and branches in USA, Canada, South America, Australia, West Indies, Philippines, RESA Delta - Malaysia, China, Singapore, Thailand, Hong Kong, Vietnam, Sri Lanka & Indonesia, Holland, Germany, the United Kingdom and Ireland.

=== 2003 - Present ===
The Pathfinder Scouts' Association (PSA) and The Rover Explorer Scouts' Association (RESA), had for a while divided into separate associations, so that each was able to build its own area of expertise.

In October 2003 the Bedfordshire Pathfinder Scouts (affiliated members) of the Pathfinder Scouts' Association were registered with the Charity Commission, having the stated aims "to promote the physical, intellectual, social and spiritual well being of children and young people aged between 5 - 18 years in Bedfordshire and other areas through the provision of Pathfinder Traditional Scouting activities. These include adventure based on Baden Powell's Scouting for Boys, sport and other recreational activities." The Bedfordshire Pathfinder Scouts were affiliated to the Rover Explorer Scouts' Association, until they folded in 2007.

On 29 July 2011, Ray O'Donnell-Hampton retired as Chief Commissioner, investing Adrian McDowell as the New Chief Commissioner of P-RESA, seeing both associations merging together and becoming more active around the world.

The ceremony took place at the Associations' International Headquarters (IHQ) 'The Den', East Anglia, England. Adrian was awarded the 3-bead Wood Badge and Ray was bestowed with the title of Chief Commissioner Emeritus.

In June 2018 at 'Brownsea Island' The Baden Powell Pathfinder Movement {BPPM} IHQ Scoutmasters Court of Honour awarded Ray O'Donnell-Hampton the Bronze Wolf and invested him with the title of 'Deputy Chief Scout'.

January 2024, Sir Mior Malaysia Chief Commissioner & Sir Ve IHQ Commissioner. Ray O'Donnell-Hampton {P-REAS-BPPM} 'IHQ Scoutmasters Court of Honour awarded' 'Chief Scout'.

== International Branches ==
The Baden Powell Pathfinder Movement {BPPM} has Members in 15 countries. The IHQ UK {Scoutmaster Court of Honour} Covers 5 Regions Worldwide:-

Africa Gambia - Nigeria

Asia China - Hong Kong - Malaysia - Nepal - Philippines - Thailand - Vietnam

Europe Switzerland

Oceania Australia - New Zealand

The Americas Argentina - Canada - United States of America
