= Scout sign and salute =

Salute of the World Scouting Movement

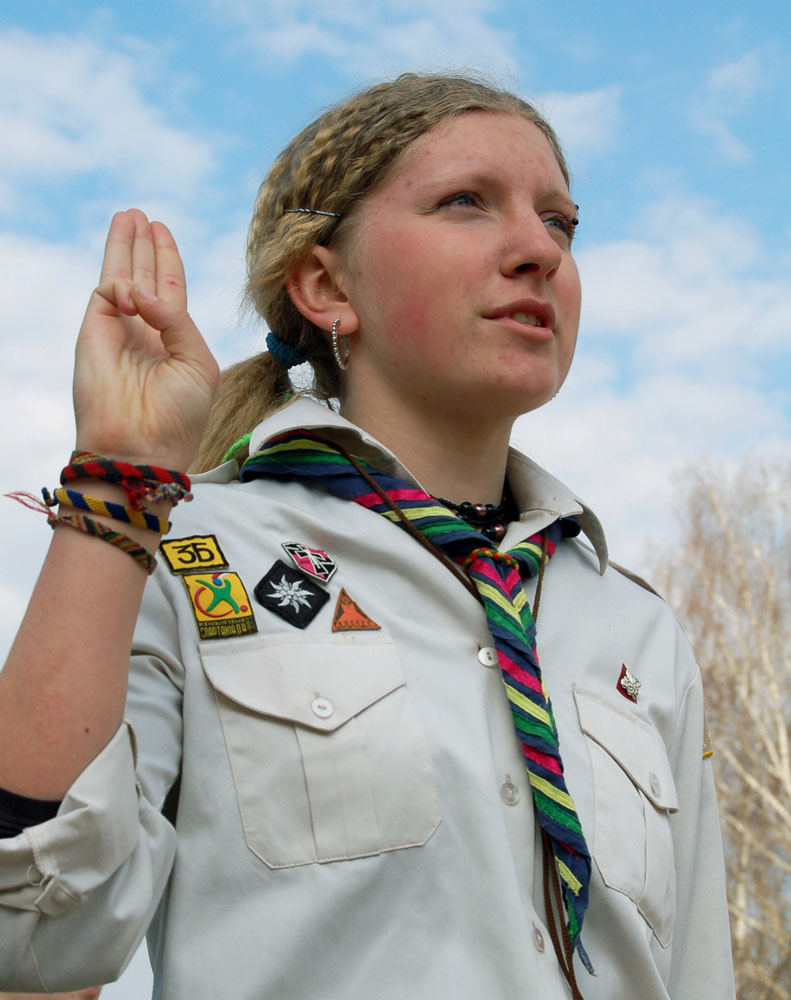
- Ukrainian girl Scout from Plast making the Scout sign

The three-finger salute is used by members of Scout and guide organizations around the world when greeting other Scouts and in respect of a national flag at ceremonies. In most situations, the salute is made with the right hand, palm face out, the thumb holding down the little finger. There are some variations of the salute between national Scouting organizations and also within some programme sections.

A "half-salute", known as the Scout sign, is also used in certain situations. The hand is still held palm facing out, and the thumb holding the little finger, but the hand is held at the shoulder instead. Other organizations with historical ties to Scouting such as Scouts Royale Brotherhood and Alpha Phi Omega use it as well.

== Meaning of the three fingers ==
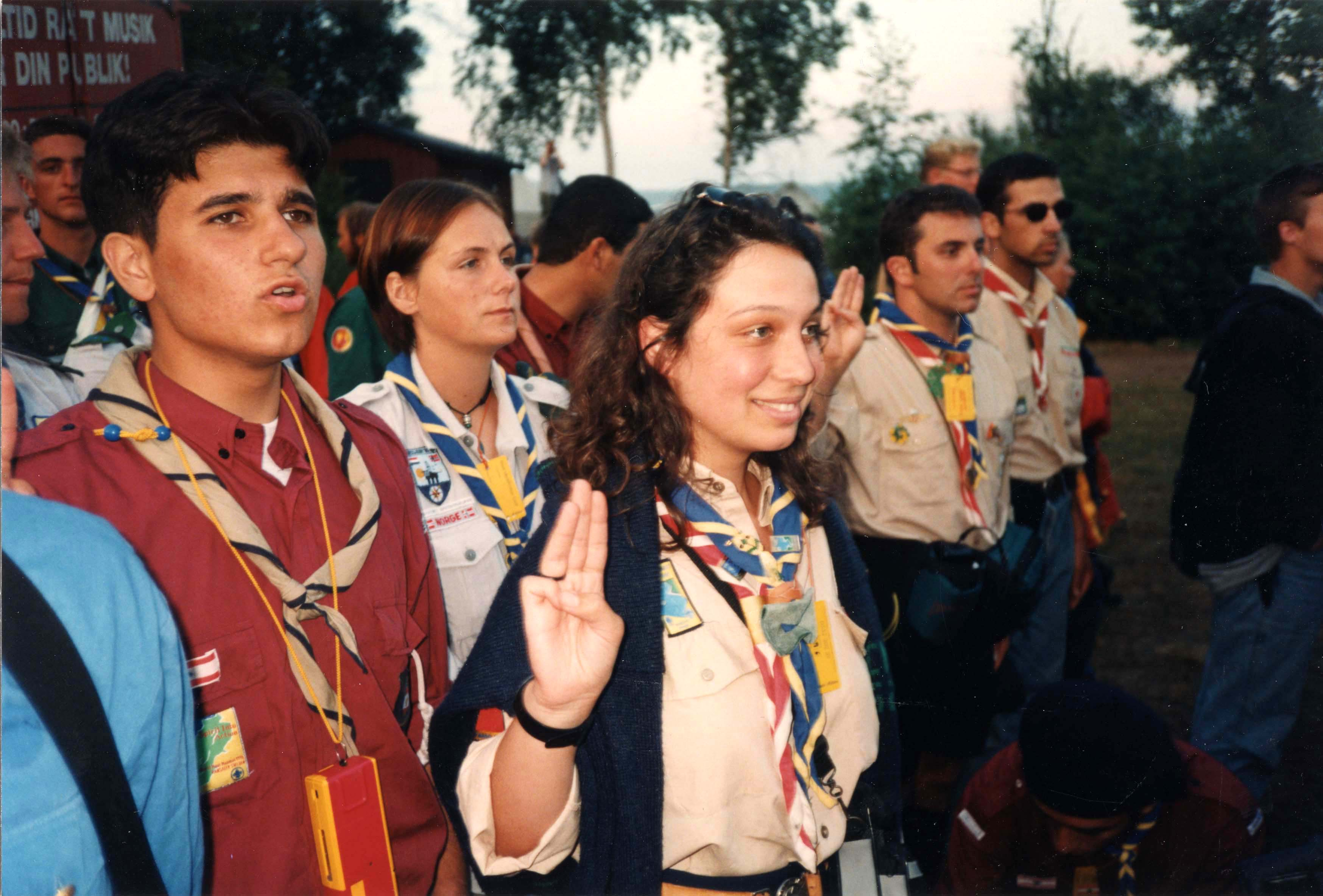
Scouts using the three-finger salute as the Scout sign.

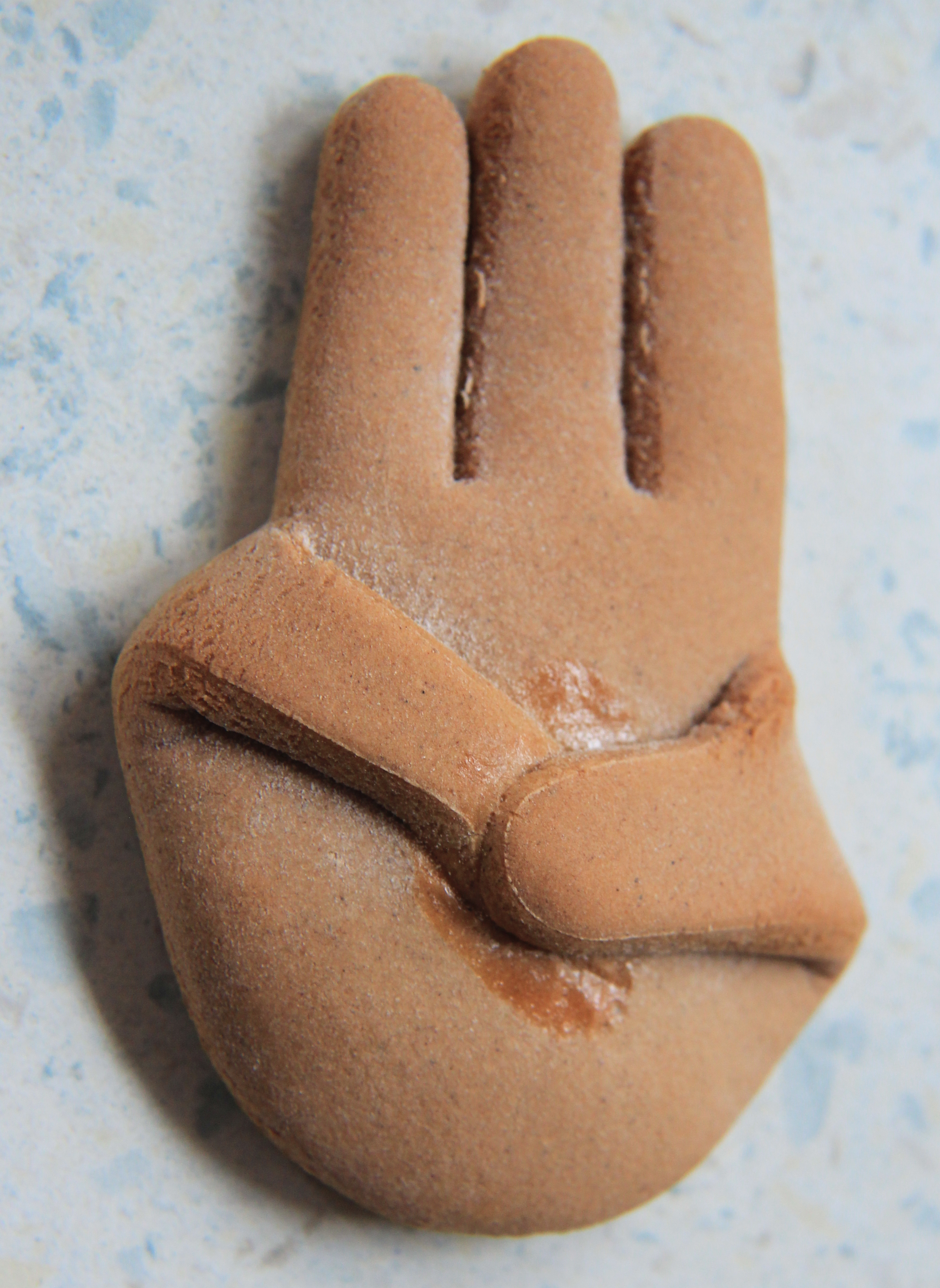
Gingerbread cookie in shape of the three-finger salute.

In his book, Scouting for Boys, Robert Baden-Powell chose the three-finger salute for Scouts to represent the three aspects of the Scout Promise:

1. Honour God and Country
2. Help Others
3. Obey the Scout Law

=== Cub Scouts' two-finger salute ===
Cub Scout sections can use a two-finger salute, depending on the national Scouting organization they belong to. This is done to represent the two rules of the original Cub Scout / Wolf Cub law. The salute is performed with the right hand.

In The Wolf Cub's Handbook, Baden-Powell wrote: "Why two fingers? Well, you know what a Wolf's head looks like with two ears cocked up. It is used as the badge of the Wolf Cub. Your two fingers in the salute are the two ears of the Wolf."

== Salute or sign? ==
Originally, Baden-Powell intended for Scouts to salute each other in greeting when they first saw each other for the first time using the "secret sign", or half-salute. This was regardless of whether the Scouts knew each other or not. Officers, such as Patrol Leaders, Scoutmasters, or members of the armed forces, were to be saluted with a full-salute.

Full-salutes were also required at the hoisting of the Union Flag, the playing of the national anthem, or at funerals.

== By country ==
=== Canada ===
In Scouts Canada the salute is rendered vertically, palm out similar to British Army/Commonwealth salutes, except if the member is a Sea Scout where it is palm in/angled down (traditionally, to hide your 'dirty hands' from the ship's captain). Beaver Scouts in Canada use a variant of the two-fingered sign with the fingers bent forwards forming "teeth". When they move up to Cub Scouts part of the ceremony sometimes includes a Scouter straightening the fingers to change from the Beaver to Cub sign.

=== Switzerland, Belgium and Germany ===
The half-salute is used by Swiss Scouts when shaking (left) hands with other Scouts or leaders on greeting or parting.

Additional meaning of the thumb holding down the little finger as explained in Switzerland and Germany: the big and strong protects the weak and little.

To greet each other, German-speaking Scouts often say 'Gut Pfad', which can literally be translated to 'Good Path'. This comes from the German term for 'scout', which is 'Pfadfinder'.

=== United Kingdom ===
The Scout Association uses the three-fingered Scout sign for all sections, including Cub Scouts. The two-fingered Cub salute was abandoned by the Scout Association following a recommendation by the Advance Party Report in 1966, that "there should be only one salute for the whole Movement". The Scout sign is used while making or reaffirming the Beaver Scout, Cub Scout or Scout Promise and at no other time. The Scout salute is the same but held to the forehead rather than vertically, and is used to salute the Union Flag, section/group colours, or at funerals or the National Anthem. The Baden-Powell Scouts' Association uses both the three and two fingered salutes. Girlguiding only uses the guide sign (half salute), though historically the full salute was used.

=== United States ===
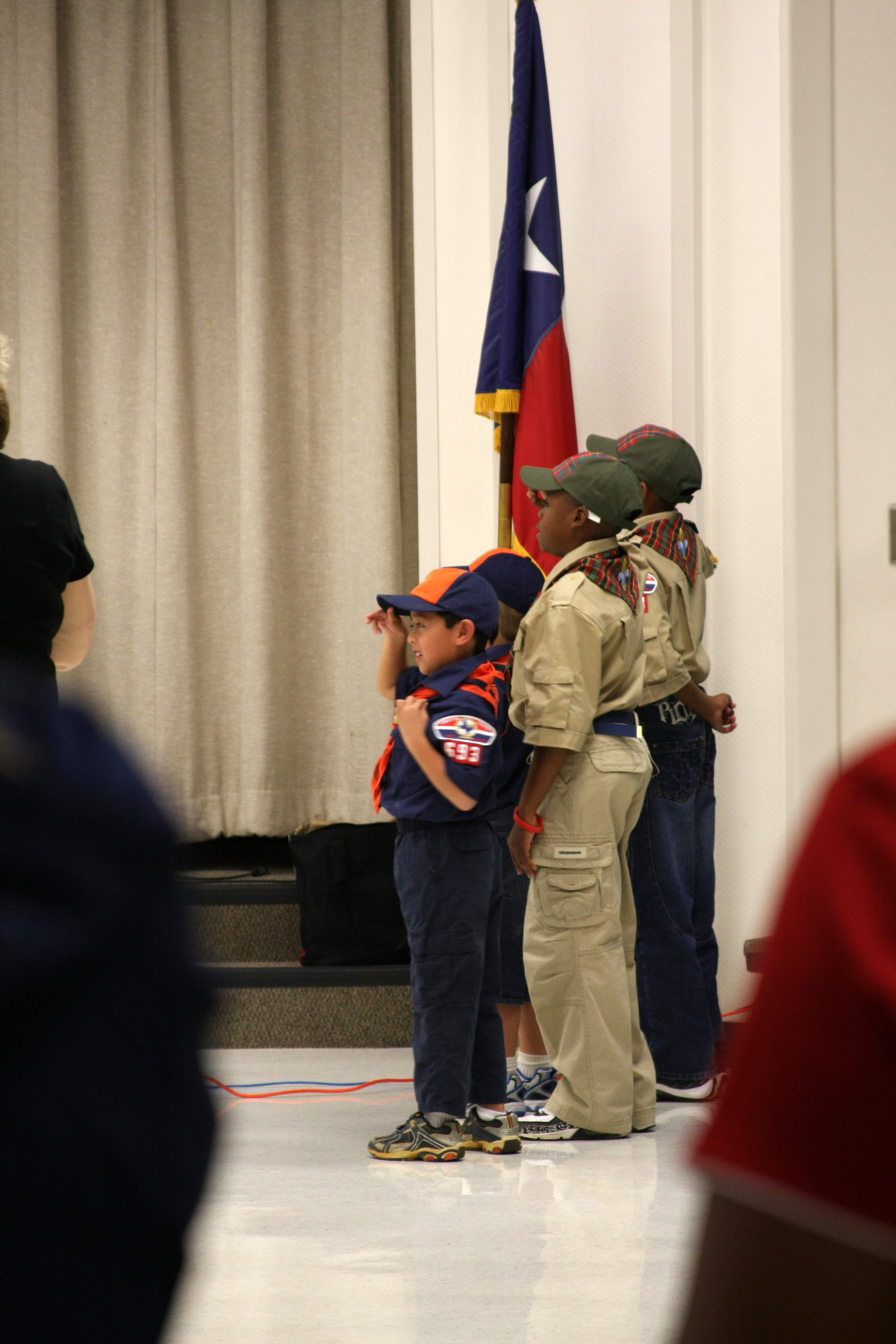
Texas Cub Scouts saluting.

==== Outdoor Service Guides (formerly Baden Powell Service Association) ====
As a member of WFIS and part of the international Traditional Scouting movement, the Scout sign and salute differs by section in the OSG-US. The Timberwolf (cub) section uses the two-finger (spread) salute, and the two finger Scout salute as defined in the 1938 PO&R, while the Pathfinder (scout) and Rovers use the traditional three-finger sign and salute.

==== Scouting America (Formerly Boy Scouts of America) ====
Cub Scouts use the two finger Scout sign and salute—the sign is presented with the fingers apart to represent the ears of Akela the wolf. Scouts BSA, Venturers and Sea Scouts use the three finger sign and salute. The Scout sign is performed with the upper arm parallel to the ground and the forearm vertical, forming a right angle at the elbow. The Scout sign is used when reciting any of the ideals of the Scouting America such as the Scout Oath and Scout Law. It is also used to gain the attention of the group.

The salute is rendered in the American style with the palm in and is only used to salute the flag of the United States. Early BSA protocol required Scouts to salute each other, but this was discontinued in 1972.

==== Girl Scouts of the USA ====
As a member of WAGGGS, the Girl Scouts of the USA use the three-fingered sign at shoulder height. The three fingers represent the person's own spiritual beliefs, other people and the Girl Scout Law. This differs from the 1913 version where the first finger represented God and Country.

== Worldwide ==
All World Association of Girl Guides and Girl Scouts members share the three fingered sign, with the palm facing out held at shoulder height, elbow by the side and the thumb holding the little finger. This is used in numerous situations of respect including when making or reciting the Promise, receiving awards, honouring a flag, honouring the dead and meeting other Girl Guides and Girl Scouts. In the latter case, it may be used in conjunction with the left handshake.
