= First Class Scout (Boy Scouts of America) =

Rank in Scouting

First Class Rank
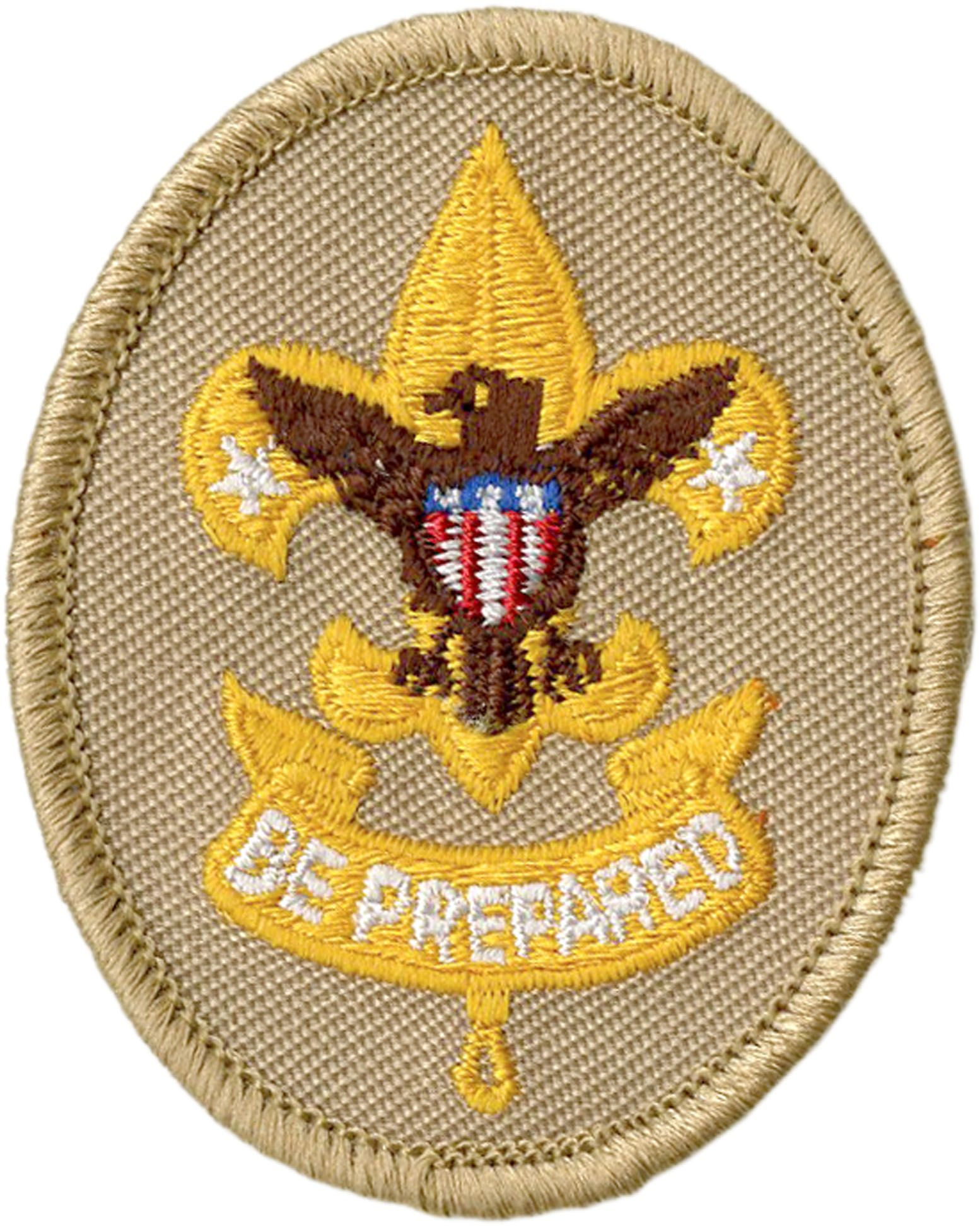
- First Class rank badge

First Class Scout is a rank in the Boy Scouts of America, the rank above Second Class and below Star Scout. It is the highest of the lower four ranks in Scouting, and is the minimum rank that need be attained for entry into the Order of the Arrow.

== Background ==
Robert Baden-Powell, the founder of The Boy Scouts Association and author of the 1908 handbook Scouting for Boys, wanted a First Class Scout to be the complete outdoorsman. Originally, First Class scout was the final and highest rank. Later ranks were originally recognitions of earning merit badges beyond First Class, and not properly ranks. Now these additional ranks form a second tier where Scouts can further develop leadership skills and explore potential vocations and avocations through the merit badge program.

For a brief period in Scouting's history, prior to the introduction of Eagle Scout, First Class Scout was the highest rank in the BSA; for several more years, it was the highest rank needed (until Star and Life became mandatory) for Eagle.

The number of Scouts achieving First Class within one year of joining is still one of the key measures of unit effectiveness. Studies have shown that if a Scout achieves First Class within a year of joining, he typically stays in the Scout program for at least three years. Scouts who do so are more likely to retain Scout values as an adult and achieve the BSA primary mission of "producing useful citizens".

The symbol of this rank combines the symbols of the previous ranks: Scout, Tenderfoot, and Second Class. The Scout symbol is from the Scout rank, the eagle with the shield is from Tenderfoot, and the scroll with "Be Prepared" comes from the Second Class Rank. Star Scout and Life Scout both add to this with a star and a heart, respectively.

== Requirements ==
Though the Tenderfoot, Second Class and First Class rank requirements can be worked on simultaneously, the ranks must be earned in order. Typically, a Scout takes around a year to 18 months in order to earn First Class. In order to become a First Class Scout, a Scout must complete 38 requirements spanning topics such as camping, cooking, using tools, navigation, aquatics, first aid/emergency preparedness, fitness, citizenship, leadership, and Scout Spirit.

== See also ==
- Ranks in Scouts BSA

== Bibliography ==
- The Scouts BSA Handbook For Boys (11th ed.). Irving, Texas: Boy Scouts of America. 1998. ISBN 0-8395-3105-2.
- Scouts BSA Handbook For Boys (14th ed.). Irving, Texas: Boy Scouts of America (published February 19, 2020). 2019. ISBN 978-0839501367.
