= Scout method =

Informal educational system used by Scouts

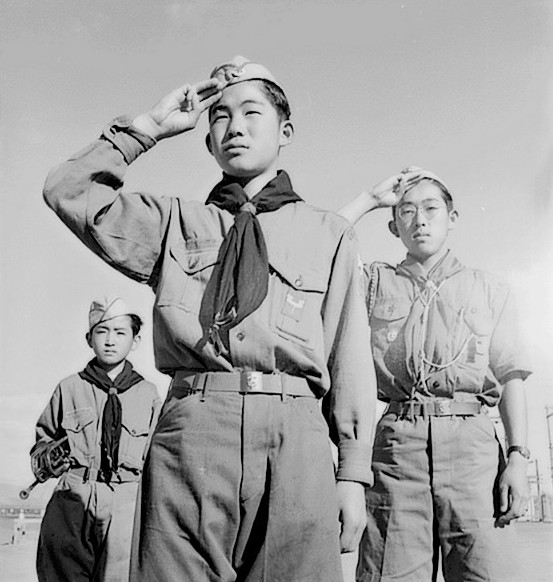
- World War II era Japanese American Boy Scouts, Heart Mountain Relocation Center, Heart Mountain, Wyoming

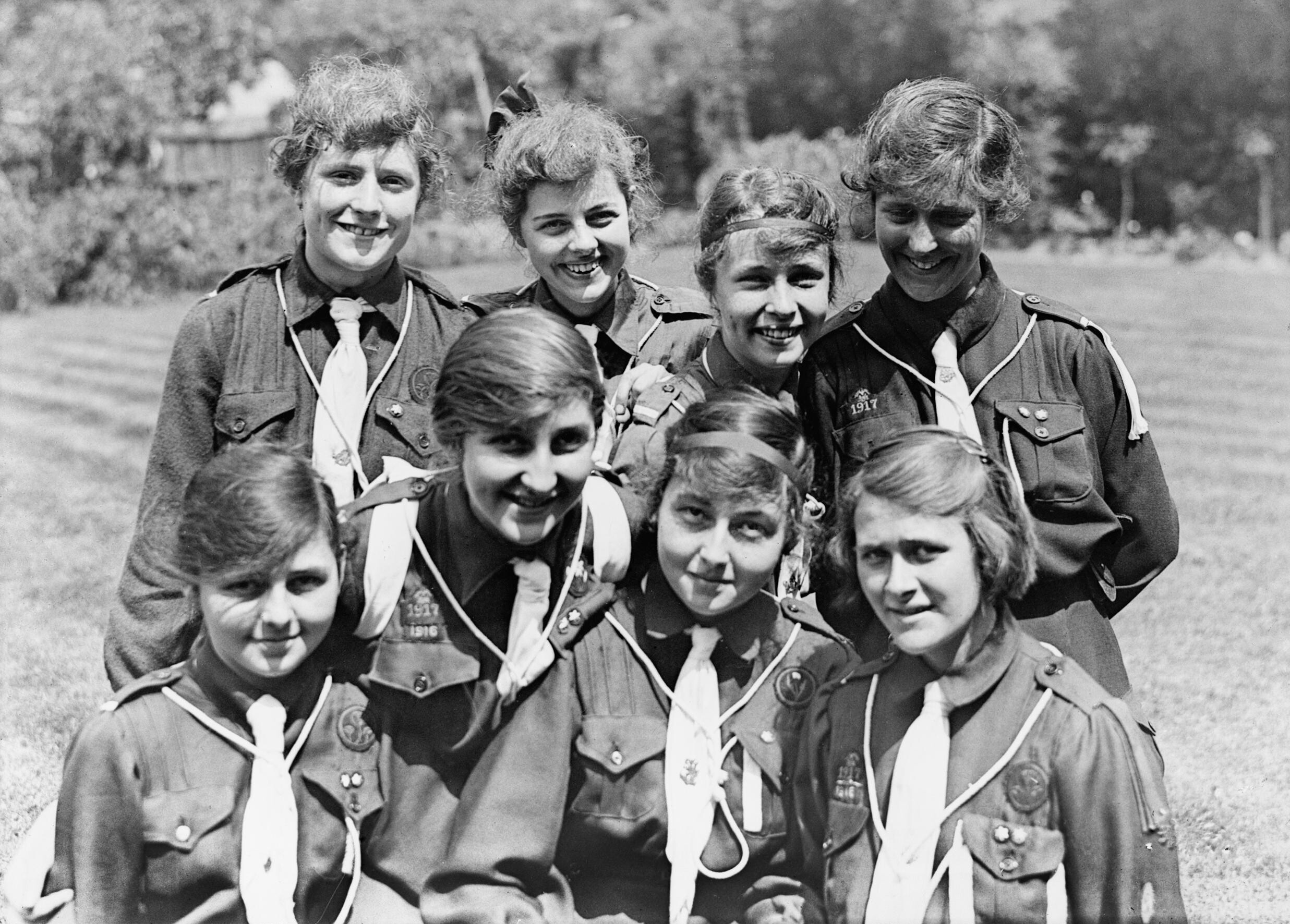
- Girl Guides in the United Kingdom, 1918

The Scout method is the informal educational system used in the Scout Movement with some variations among different Scout organizations.

Scout training is character development to help Scouts become independent and helpful, and thereby become "healthy, happy, helpful citizens". The Scout method uses appealing activities in the outdoors with a simplified social structure to generate challenges from which Scouts learn. Through the training, Scouts are taught independence, leadership, the ambition to learn by themselves and a moral code with positive goals. The Scout method works by following the natural impulses of the Scout and unconsciously because the Scout is not aware of the education. Activities and games provide a fun way to develop skills and, when conducted outdoors, provide contact with nature and the environment. Hands-on activities provide practical learning and help the Scout build confidence. Scouts learn in small groups to develop self-confidence, readiness, self-reliance, responsibility, collaboration, social bonds, teamwork and leadership.

== WOSM version ==
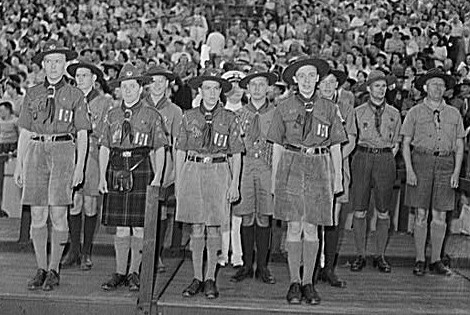
British Scouts in Detroit, July 1942. Photograph by Arthur Siegel.

The World Organization of the Scout Movement (WOSM) definition of the Scout Method has changed over time. In the 1980s, WOSM defined the Scout Method as composed of four elements:

- Scout Law and Scout Promise (Scout Oath)
- learning by doing
- development of small groups and
- a progressive and attractive programs of different activities.

In the 1990s, WOSM changed its definition of the Scout Method to be composed of seven elements. In 2017, at the WOSM's 41st conference in Azerbaijan, an eighth element, "community involvement", was added. These eight elements are summarized below.

On terminology, the wording "Scout Method" (capital "M") is endorsed by WOSM.

=== Law and promise ===
The Scout law guides a Scout how to live. It expresses positive expectations of good, not prohibitions of faults. It is at the heart of the Scout Method. The Scout promise engages a Scout to do their best to obey the Scout law. The main principles of the promise are:

- Duty to God
- Duty to others
- Duty to self

Positive not prohibitive

Scout programs do not prohibit bad habits but instead provide better alternatives to do good that will absorb the Scout's attention and gradually lead them to forget old habits.^{[a]} The reasoning is that "prohibition generally invites evasion, since it challenges the spirit inherent in every red-blooded boy. The boy is not governed by DON'T but is led on by DO." Another positive is the ?? to perform a daily good turn for others. Some cultures place emphasis on doing good, a utilitarian approach, while others place greater emphasis on the individual being good.

Spirituality

A Scout should be spiritual but becoming a Scout is open to members of all religions. Scout deals with religion in a practical way: by observation of the world, (to see what God is) and helping others (for which God asks). This is part of all religions. Scouts develop their spiritual side through learning life-saving techniques and by promoting the daily good deed. Some national organizations, including The Scout Association in the United Kingdom, no longer require religious practice as a duty.

Good deeds

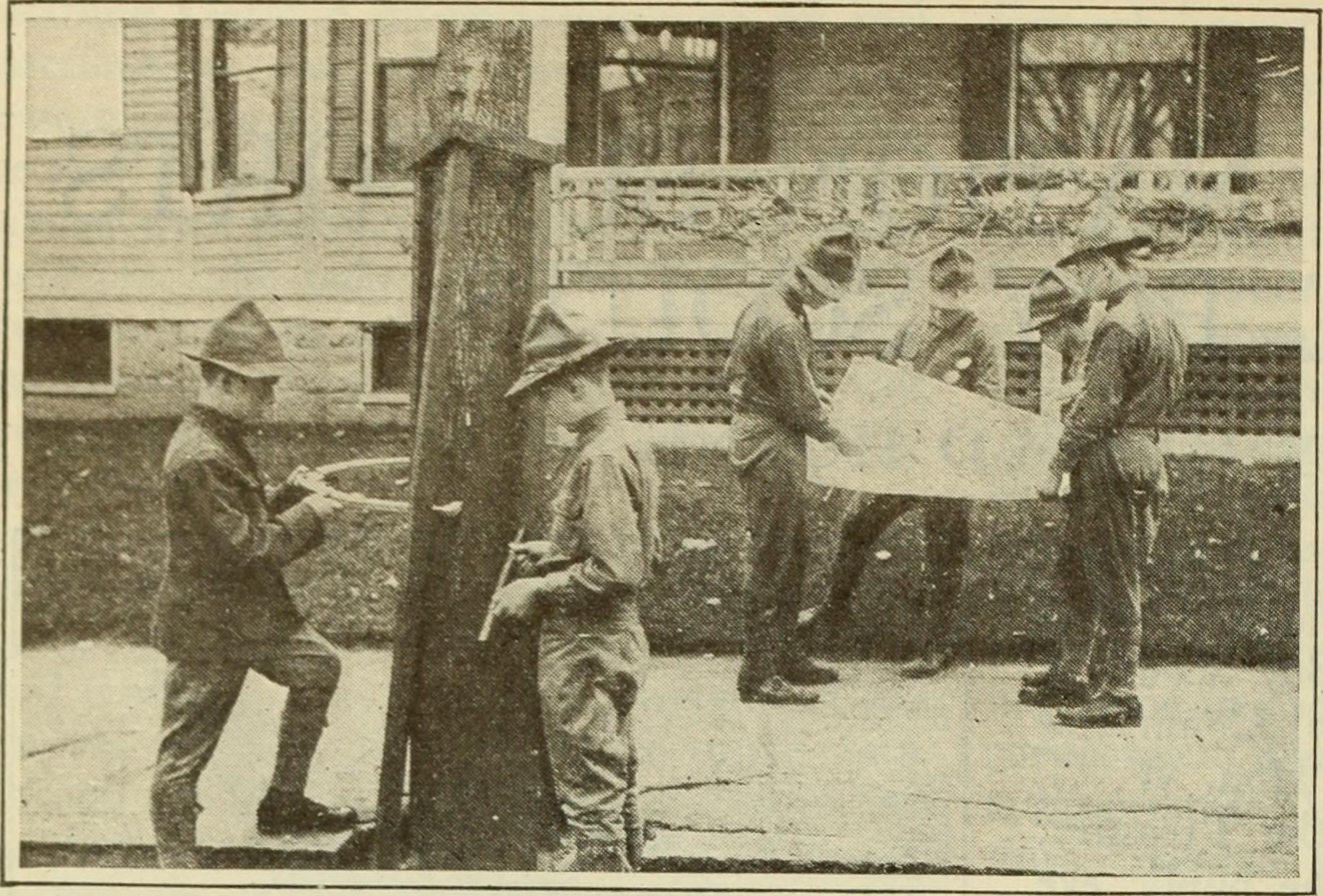
Scouts doing a good deed

The good deed is a key component of the law and promise. WOSM suggests it is the main duty God asks for and fulfilling our duty to others makes us happy, which fulfills the duty to ourselves. The point is not so much the deed itself, which could be minor but to inculcate the Scout to always pay attention and recognise if he could help someone.^{[a]}

WOSM believes that education is a process of seeking and finding, this should be accomplished by planning and revisiting matters again in different contexts, presenting them to ourselves and working to keep operational "activities" helping the boy scout find the idea and "experience the thrill of the real Good Turn".

=== Learning by doing ===
Scout activities and games are full of practical action. This holds the participant's attention and gives them hands-on experience in how the theory works. Although emphasis is placed on practical work and independent learning, this does not rule out the need for instruction by leaders or in books. The phrase "Learning by doing" is much used by Scout organizations and in Scout programs.

=== Patrol system ===
The Patrol System is the one essential feature in which Scout training differs from that of all other organizations and where the System is properly applied, it is absolutely bound to bring success. It cannot help itself! The formation of the boys into Patrols of from six to eight and training them as separate units each under its own responsible leader is the key to a good Troop.

— Robert Baden-Powell^{[a]}

In the patrol system or patrol method, Scouts are organised in small groups (about five to eight Scouts) because this is the natural way boys work together in gangs.^{[a]} Patrols are therefore more important than the Scout troop. Patrols must be kept intact in all activities, including working, tenting, learning, cooking and surviving together.^{[a]} In a Patrol, the Scouts learn to work with others, while the Patrol leader learns responsibility for others. Both have to give up part of their personal interest for this.^{[a]} However, Scouts are dealt with as individuals, not with the group.^{[a]} A Scout has his own identity within the group and learns as an individual. The Patrol serves as the character school for the individual.^{[a]}

Court of Honour

The Scout patrols are subject to a Court of Honour or "Patrol Leaders' Council", composed of the Patrol Leaders, with the Scout Leader as advisor.^{[a]} This is a peer system in which Scouts discuss each other's behaviour and is part of the self-governing aspect.

Some programs associated with Scouts but for children who are too young to be Scouts, such as Cubs and Beavers, replicate some elements of patrol organization with Cup Packs divided into sixes under a sixer and seconder and Beavers organized in lodges.

=== Symbolic framework ===
Imagination

Scout training makes us of imagination and make-believe in which the Scout emulates adventurers such as explorers, backwoodsmen, pioneers, sailors and airmen.^{[a]} The Scout identifies with the personal qualities of these heroes. Some Scout programs use a theatrical and non-serious element, using words with strange meanings, yells, songs and unique customs. The common uniform is also part of this theatre.

Rituals

Scouts use a number of rituals. They are designed to be short, simple and attractive for Scouts but with underlying symbolism.

=== Personal progression ===
Self-reliance

A Scout learns to make their own decisions, helping them to grow and mature. (Note: A Scout should paddle his own canoe, metaphorically speaking. He should travel not in a rowing boat, with his back to where he goes, rowed by others and someone else at the rudder but alone in a canoe: facing the future, paddling and steering by himself.) Scout training teaches self-reliance by bringing the Scouts into a challenging, somewhat risky environment, without help in the direct neighbourhood. Therefore, the program is based on an adult, adventurous and appealing outdoor life. "A man's job cut down to boy's size."^{[a]}

Self-governing

Giving responsibility to the Scouts is a keystone of the Scout method: "Expect him to carry out his charge faithfully. Don't keep prying to see how he does. Let him do it his own way. Let him come a howler over it if need be but in any case leave him alone." The Patrol is almost independent, while the Troop is run by the Patrol Leaders in the Patrols' Leaders Council and Court of Honour.^{[a]}

Self-learning

Scout training should give a Scout the ambition and desire to learn by himself, which is more valuable than receiving instruction from leaders. This is done by having the Scout undertake activities that attract him individually from the selection offered in Scouting for Boys.^{[a]}

Badge system

The "Personal Progressive Scheme" is based on two complementary elements:

- Proficiency (Merit) badges are intended to encourage the Scout to learn a subject which could be his work or hobby and cover many different types of activities not always related to Scoutcraft.
- Class badges or Progress system:
  - Class badges are successive stages in which the Scout learns the techniques needed for the Scout game. An important final (first Class) test for the Scout or Guide section is making a journey on their own, proving their independence.
  - The personal progress system was introduced by the World Organization of the Scout Movement as an alternative to the Class badges. The programme uses successive stages which young people go through in order to reach the educational objectives for each age group. The system puts more emphasis on personal objectives of physical, intellectual, affective, social, spiritual and character development.

Badges are not a final goal but a first step, to give a Scout encouragement.^{[a]} The Scout should then decide by himself to proceed if he likes the activity, without further need of standards.

Non-competitive

Scout training is non-competitive because Scouts should learn because they like the subject, not just in competition or to be better than others.^{[a]}

Individual Scout training is individual because every Scout, no matter what their capabilities, must be inspired to learn. The goal is not the quality of the whole group. Scouts should proceed on their own level. The badges signify not a certain quality of knowledge or skill as "the amount of effort the Scout puts into his work." The standards were therefore purposely not clearly defined.^{[a]}

=== Nature ===
Nature as the learning school

Scout games mostly take place in nature, because in nature the Scout and the Patrol learn to overcome difficulties and learn to make their own decisions.

God in nature

A Scout can find God in Nature when he realizes the complexity and beauty of Nature.

=== Adult support ===
Example of the leader

An important part of Scout training is the personal example of the leader. The Scout is impressed by the leader because of his age, his knowledge and his position as a leader. If the leader is popular, leadership will be seen as an attractive goal and the Scout will follow the example of the leader. The Scoutmaster living the Scout law will have more influence than one who simply talks about it. In the boys' eyes it is what a man does that counts and not so much what he says.^{[a]}

Guide

The self-governing of the boys changes the role of the leader: "I had stipulated that the position of Scoutmaster was to be neither that of a schoolmaster nor of a commander Officer but rather that of an elder brother among his boys, not detached or above them individually, able to inspire their efforts and to suggest new diversions when his finger on their pulse told him the attraction of any present craze was wearing off." Scout leaders should not direct but guide (and check on safety).

=== Community Involvement ===
This refers to knowledge of and service to the various communities that a person is part of, local, national and international.

== Traditional Scout version ==
In Traditional Scouting, a "back-to-basics" approach to Scout training that aims to restore a traditional model, the Scout Method is simpler. It is defined as a system of progressive self-education through:

- Having a uniform, promise and law;
- Learning by doing (hands-on training);
- Use of the Patrol System; and
- A progressive and stimulating program of varied activities based on the interests of the participants, including games, useful skills and services in the community and all taking place largely in an outdoor setting in contact with nature.

Adherence to the Scout Method is a defining characteristic for membership of the Baden-Powell Service Association.

== WAGGS version ==
The World Association of Girl Guides and Girl Scouts (WAGGS) uses a five-part method which is similar to WOSM's definition.

== See also ==
- Scout Spirit
- Scoutcraft
- Educational progressivism
- Aims and Methods of Scouting – For the Scouts BSA
