= Scout Spirit =

Attitude desired in Scouts

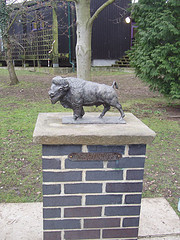
- Buffalo Statue, donated to Gilwell Park by the Boy Scouts of America in 1926

Scout spirit is an attitude that Scouts around the world are supposed to show, based on adherence to the ideals of Scouting. Scouting's founder, Baden Powell, once said, "The spirit is there in every boy; it has to be discovered and brought to light."

== The Unknown Scout ==
This is the oft told story of the Unknown Scout used to exemplify Scout Spirit:

And so 51-year-old William D. Boyce, newspaper and magazine publisher from Chicago, Illinois, met the founder of the Boy Scout movement, the British military hero, Lieutenant-General Robert S. S. Baden-Powell, and learned about Scouting from the chief Scout himself.

On February 8, 1910, Boyce and a group of leaders founded the Boy Scouts of America. From that day forth, Scouts have celebrated February 8 as the birthday of Scouting in the United States.

In the British Scout Training Centre at Gilwell Park, England, Scouts from the United States erected a statue of an American Buffalo in honor of this unknown Scout. The statue is inscribed, "To the Unknown Scout Whose Faithfulness in the Performance of the Daily Good turn Brought the Scout Movement to the United States of America."

== Boy Scouts of America ==
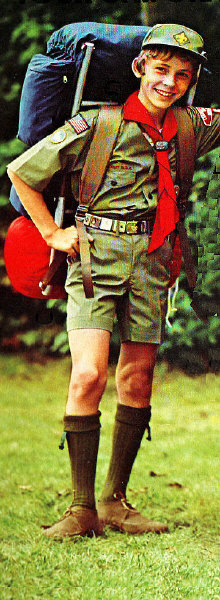
U.S. Scout in 1974

The Scoutmaster guides the boy in the spirit of an older brother

— Baden Powell

The Boy Scouts of America Mechanics of Advancement says:

The ideals of the Boy Scouts of America are spelled out in the Scout Oath, Scout Law, Scout motto, and Scout slogan. Members incorporating these ideals into their daily lives at home, at school, in their religious life, and in their neighborhoods, for example, are said to have Scout spirit.

Scoutmasters and Boards of Review must be careful in how they measure it:

Evaluating Scout spirit will always be a judgment call, but through getting to know a young man and by asking probing questions, we can get a feel for it. We can say however, that we do not measure Scout spirit by counting meetings and outings attended. It is indicated, instead, by the way he lives his life.

The Scout's demonstration of Scout spirit is discussed at the Scoutmaster conference and the board of review when the Scout advances to a new rank.

== See also ==
- Scout method
- Scout Law
- Scout Motto
- Scout Oath
- Scout prayer
- Scout sign and salute
