= Scouting and Guiding in the United Kingdom =

Scouting and Guiding in the United Kingdom is served by several different organisations:

- The Scout Association, member of World Organization of the Scout Movement
- Girlguiding UK, member of World Association of Girl Guides and Girl Scouts
  - Trefoil Guild, corporate member of Girlguiding UK and member of International Scout and Guide Fellowship
- Baden-Powell Scouts' Association, member of World Federation of Independent Scouts
- Pathfinder Scouts Association and Rover Explorer Scouts Association
- European Scout Federation (British Association), member of Confédération Européenne de Scoutisme
- Guides and Scouts of Europe, UK. Member of UIGSE
- The British Boy Scouts and British Girl Scouts Association, (BBS & BGS) member of Order of World Scouts
- Plast-Ukrainian Scouting in Great Britain
- Boys' Brigade
- Girls' Brigade
- Royal Rangers in The United Kingdom
- Pathfinders, a youth organisation of the Seventh-day Adventist Church, member of Pathfinders International
- British Camp Fire Girls' Association
- Adult Scout Alliance, which includes B-P Scout Guild Scotland and Baden-Powell Guild of Great Britain, member of International Scout and Guide Fellowship
- Student Scout and Guide Organisation
- Scout and Guide Graduate Association
- UK Navigators
- Phoenix Independent Scouts Association

Independent British Scout organisations usually follow more traditional Scouting methods practised by Baden-Powell. Examples include the Baden-Powell Scouts (formed in 1970), Pathfinder Scouts Association (formed in 2003) and the Rover Explorer Scouts Association, which uses Scouting based on Christian values.

Other Scout organisations in the United Kingdom include independent branches of the Polish Scout Association, the Hungarian Scout Association, the Lithuanian Scouts Association and a chapter of Homenetmen in London. The roots of these émigré organisations are the Second World War and the Cold War when refugees fled their countries and international communities in the UK wishing to maintain their home culture of Scouting rather than following the British Scouting Programme.

Also International Scout and Guide units are active in the United Kingdom. Scouts et Guides de France operates one group in London. There also American Scout units, served by the Transatlantic Council, American Girl Scouts served by the USAGSO headquarters. and Israel Scouts tribes in London

Catholic Guides of Ireland and Scouting Ireland are both also active in Northern Ireland.

== See also ==
- Scouting in displaced persons camps
