= Ranks in Scouts BSA =

- The Eagle Scout rank badge

The advancement program for Scouts participating in the Scouts BSA program of Scouting America is symbolized by the earning of seven ranks. The advancement program is often considered to be divided into two phases. The first phase from joining to First Class is designed to teach the scout Scoutcraft skills, how to participate in a group and to learn self-reliance. The Scout badge is awarded when the Scout demonstrates a rudimentary knowledge of the Scouting ideals and program. Tenderfoot, Second Class, and First Class have progressively harder requirements in the areas of Scoutcraft, physical fitness, citizenship, personal growth and Scout Spirit.

The second phase: Star, Life, and Eagle, is designed to develop leadership skills and allow the Scout to explore potential vocations and avocations through the merit badge program. The Star and Life ranks require that the scout serve in a position of responsibility and perform community service. Except for Scout rank (and Eagle Palms as of August 1, 2017), all ranks require that the candidate participate in a Scoutmaster conference and pass a Board of Review.

== Advancement process ==
Merit badges and rank may be earned by any registered Scout until their eighteenth birthday. Venturers and Sea Scouts who earned First Class as Scouts BSA members may continue to work towards Eagle Scout in their crew or ship until age eighteen.

Scouts participate in a Scoutmaster conference as a requirement for each rank. For ranks other than the Scout rank, when all other requirements have been completed, the Scout appears before a board of review as the final requirement. The awards are generally given at a Court of Honor.

=== Scoutmaster conference ===
The Scoutmaster conference is a meeting between the Scoutmaster and the Scout and is a requirement for each rank. The Scoutmaster reviews the Scout's progress and ensures all requirements have been met. The Scout is expected to show how they have grown in their understanding of the Scouting ideals, including the Scout Oath and the Scout Law, and how they have applied those ideals. The Scoutmaster will also discuss the next steps in advancement and encourages the Scout to advance.

=== Board of review ===
The board of review is a group of three to six members of the troop committee and is the final approval process for Scout rank advancement. The board reviews the Scout to ensure all requirements are met and attempts to determine the Scout's attitude and their acceptance of Scouting's ideals and their application. The board also solicits the Scout's opinions on the troop program and on youth and adult leadership.

==== Eagle Scout ====
The Eagle Scout board of review is convened by the council or district. Members are selected by council policy and may include troop committee members, district or council Eagle representatives or community members with an understanding of the Eagle board. There must be at least one district or council Eagle representative. Scouts must attain the requirements for this rank prior to their 18th birthday, though the board of review itself can be done after the 18th birthday.

== Rank advancement ==
=== Emblems ===
Scouts BSA rank badges

Scout Tenderfoot Second Class First Class Star Life Eagle

The program uses a series of medals and patches as emblems. The badge for the Scout rank consists of a simple fleur-de-lis, which symbolizes a compass needle. The needle points the Scout in the right direction, which is onward and upward. The Tenderfoot badge takes the fleur-de-lis of the Scout badge and adds two stars and an eagle with an American shield. The stars symbolize truth and knowledge; the eagle and shield symbolize freedom and readiness to defend it. The Second Class badge features a scroll inscribed with the Scout Motto, BE PREPARED, with the ends turned up and a knotted rope hanging from the bottom. The knot reminds each Scout to remember the Scout slogan, Do a Good Turn Daily, and the upturned ends of the scroll symbolize cheerfulness in service. The First Class badge combines the elements of the Tenderfoot and Second Class badges. For many years, the First Class badge was used as the official emblem of the BSA. Star has a First Class symbol on a five-pointed yellow star, and initially indicated the five merit badges required to earn the rank. Life has a First Class emblem on a red heart, and initially symbolized the first-aid and health-related merit badges that the rank required. Now it signifies that the ideals of Scouting have become a part of the Scout's life and character.

The rank insignia have been around since the beginning. The current design for the Eagle Scout badge was adopted in 1985, with minor modifications in 1986 and 1989. The Eagle Scout medal is of the same basic design as in 1915, with only occasional slight modifications due to changes in manufacturer over time, most recently in 1999. The current designs of the other rank badges were finalized in 1990.

For Scouting America’s centennial year of 2010, special rank badges were available. For each badge from Scout through Life, the badge design is encircled by brown lettering that says "2010 (Rank) Scout", and "Boy Scouts of America". For the Eagle badge, which already had the design surrounded by white lettering ("Eagle Scout"/"Boy Scouts of America") the only change is the addition of "2010" before "Eagle". These badges could be earned during 2010 only.

For the Eagle Scout's centennial year of 2012, on the Eagle Scout badge only, it states Centennial on the writing around the badge.

In accordance with the organization’s 2025 name change, the “Boy Scouts of America” text on the Eagle Scout rank badge was changed to read “Scouting America”.

=== Scout ===
Scout was previously a joining badge, but is now considered the first rank, and is earned by completing certain requirements. As of September 2023, the Scout badge has a gold fleur-de-lis on a tan background. The badge is awarded when the youth demonstrates a rudimentary knowledge of Scouting skills and ideals such as tying a square knot and knowing the Scout oath, law, motto, and slogan.

=== Tenderfoot ===
Tenderfoot is the second rank a Scout can earn. A Scout can work on the requirements for the Tenderfoot, Second Class, and First Class ranks at the same time, but each rank must be earned in sequence. The badge is awarded when the Scout completes requirements in the areas of Scoutcraft, physical fitness, citizenship, personal growth, and Scout Spirit. The badge is similar to that of the Scout rank with it adding an eagle and two stars.

=== Second Class ===
Second Class is the rank above Tenderfoot and below First Class. A Scout can work on the requirements for the Tenderfoot, Second Class, and First Class ranks at the same time, but must be earned in sequence. The badge is awarded when the Scout completes requirements in the areas of Scoutcraft, physical fitness, citizenship, personal growth and Scout Spirit.

=== First Class ===
First Class is the rank above Second Class and below Star Scout. A Scout can work on the requirements for the Tenderfoot, Second Class, and First Class ranks at the same time, but must earn them in sequence. The badge is awarded when the Scout completes requirements in the areas of Scoutcraft, physical fitness, citizenship, personal growth and Scout Spirit. At this point, Scouts shift focus from learning physical Scouting method to start developing leadership skills.

Originally, First Class was the all around Scout and the final and highest rank. Later ranks were originally recognitions of earning merit badges beyond First Class, and not properly ranks. Now these additional ranks form a second tier where Scouts can further develop leadership skills and explore potential vocations and avocations through the merit badge program.

Although Eagle is the highest rank and one all Scouts should strive for, the number of Scouts achieving First Class within one year of joining is still one of the key measures of unit effectiveness. Studies purportedly have shown that if a Scout achieves First Class within a year of joining, they typically stay in the Scout program for at least three years. Scouts who do so are purportedly more likely to retain Scout values as an adult and achieve Scouting America’s primary mission of "producing useful citizens".

From 1972 to 1990, the First Aid merit badge was required for First Class rank. After 1990, this was replaced with a series of requirements to demonstrate awareness of advanced first aid techniques, including CPR. A sixth merit badge was added to the requirement for Star rank at that time to maintain its overall requirement of 21 merit badges, and First Aid is still one of the merit badges that is mandatory for Eagle Scout.

=== Star ===
Star is the rank above First Class and below Life Scout. It is the third-highest rank. Star is awarded when the Scout serves actively in the troop, team or crew in a position of responsibility for at least 4 months; performs at least six hours of community service; and earns six merit badges (four of which must be among the 13 required for Eagle Scout rank).

Initially, the Life badge was awarded for five merit badges and the Star badge was awarded for ten. The order was reversed in the 1920s when it was decided that the five-pointed star of Star Scout better represented the five merit badges required for first rank above First Class. That symbolism disappeared when the number of merit badges required for Star was increased to six in 1972. A Star Scout is a responsible scout, a scout who not only follows the Scout Oath and Law, but also is a role model for younger scouts.

=== Life ===
Life is the second-highest rank attainable, above Star and below Eagle. Life is awarded when the Scout serves actively in the troop, team or crew, serves in a position of responsibility for six months, and performs six hours of community service. A Scout must also earn five merit badges (at least three of which must be required for the rank of Eagle) for a total of 11, including the six previously earned. Finally, the Scout must pass a Scoutmaster conference, and board of review.

Life was originally lower than Star, and originally required earning five specific merit badges concerned with health and fitness (First Aid, Lifesaving, Public Health, Personal Health and Athletics). The ranks were switched in the 1920s, following a decision to recognize the five-pointed star as a symbol of the five badges needed to earn that rank. The Life heart came to symbolize achievement in health and fitness, as the First Aid merit badge was required for both Life and Eagle until 1972, when it became required for all ranks above First Class.

=== Eagle ===
Eagle Scout is the highest rank attainable in the Scouts BSA division of Scouting America. Since its introduction in 1911, the Eagle Scout rank has been earned by more than two million young men and women.

Requirements include earning a minimum total of 21 merit badges, including all required badges that were not previously earned, and demonstration of Scout Spirit, service and leadership. This includes an extensive service project that the Scout plans, organizes, leads, and manages.

== Use in other BSA programs ==
The seven ranks are fully applicable to the Scouts BSA program, and most earning of these ranks occurs within that program. They are also offered to a more limited extent in other older scout programs.

== See also ==
- List of highest awards in Scouting
