= Wolf Cub =

Wolf Cub may refer to:

- the young of the wolf
- an original name for a Cub in a program associated with Scouting
- Wolf Cub (comics), Wolf Cub (Nicholas Gleason) is a fictional character in the Marvel Universe
