= The Chief Scout's Advance Party Report =

Report by The Scout Association

The Chief Scout's Advance Party Report 1966
- Cover of the Advance Party Report Popular Edition, printed by Kent Paper Company Ltd
- Author: The Boy Scouts Association
- Language: English
- Genre: Non-fiction
- Publisher: The Boy Scouts Association
- Publication date: 1966
- Media type: Print
- Pages: 522

The Boy Scouts Association's The Chief Scout's Advance Party Report 1966 attempted to address the association's falling enrollment numbers and modernise its programs. It resulted in changes away from traditional uniforms and loss of iconic visual identity, changes to training schemes and awards, the association's name and other nomenclature, reduced distinctions between Cubs and Scouts (against the founder’s warnings of giving Scouts a juvenile image) and discontinuation of Rovers. However, the changes failed to halt decline in older enrolments, resulting in a shift to younger ages and a more juvenile image and loss of focus on Scouts, and also resulted in disaffection, a schism in the organisation, growth of the alternate British Boy Scouts and European Scout Federation (British Association), formation of independent Scout groups and further alternate Scout organisations, particularly the Traditional Scouting Baden-Powell Scouts' Association and helped to re-establish understanding of Scouts as a movement rather than a single organisation.

== Advance Party ==
The Boy Scouts Association Chief Scout's Advance Party was formed in January 1964, when 24 Scout Leaders under the age of 45 were invited to "study all aspects of the future of Scouting and to make recommendations, after consultation with the Movement, to the Chief Scout as to the development of the Movement, both in the immediate future and for the 1970s." The Advance Party met as a body for six weekends, with various sub-committees holding an additional 166 meetings and the chairmen of these committees meeting on three occasions.

=== Advance Party members ===
Chairman: The Chief Scout, Sir Charles Maclean
Secretary: E.W. Hayden; Training Secretary, Headquarters

- J.W. Bereford; Senior Scout Leader and Assistant County Commissioner (Senior Scouts)
- P.R. Blanchflower; Scoutmaster and Assistant Deputy Camp Chief in Surrey
- Major R.H. Carr-Ellison; County Commissioner for Northumberland
- Hon. R.H.V. Cochrane; Scottish HQ Commissioner for Rover Scouts
- J.N. Coffey; Assistant County Commissioner in East Cheshire
- C.A. Cutress; Group Scoutmaster and District Commissioner in Sussex
- D.F. Dunford; District Commissioner in Monmouthshire
- J.M. Elliot; Assistant County Commissioner in Surrey
- D.W.R. Evans; Assistant County Commissioner in Essex
- C.R. Griffin; Cubmaster in Greater London Central
- Sqn. Ldr. D. Grisbrook; Senior Scout Leader in Leicestershire, HQ Commissioner Cyprus
- Sqn. Ldr. C.M. Henderson; Travelling Commissioner Scotland
- Dr. P. Johnson; District Commissioner and Deputy County Commissioner in Hampshire
- K.C. Lock; Formerly District Commissioner in North Staffordshire
- Lt. Col. H. Mainwaring; Group Scoutmaster and Assistant Commissioner in Cambridgeshire
- J.C. Moorman; Assistant County Commissioner in Somerset
- W.B. Moule; Headquarters Commissioner for Wolf Cubs and Akela Leader in Sussex
- J.A.P. Norris; District Commissioner in Manchester
- D.I.N. Olliver; Assistant County Commissioner in Central Yorkshire
- G.S. Preshner; Group Scoutmaster and Assistant Deputy Camp Chief in London
- J.N. Price; District Commissioner in Lancashire, North West
- L.C. Reynolds; County Secretary and Assistant County Commissioner in Westmorland
- K.H. Stevens; Deputy Chief Executive Commissioner at Headquarters
- J.B. Young; Assistant County Commissioner in Glasgow

== The Report ==
The Chief Scout's Advance Party Report 1966 to The Boy Scouts Association's Committee of the Council was 200,000 words long on 522 foolscap pages. This was reduced to 50,000 words in a 175-page handbook size "Advance Party Report, Popular Edition" through summarising and omitting many of the arguments relating to the 409 recommendations.

=== Key recommendations ===
1 That The Boy Scouts Association be renamed as The Scout Association.
2 Wolf Cubs be renamed Cub Scouts.
3 That the Scout and Cub Scout Promise be the same, with the removal of the phrases "On my honour" and "at all times".
4 That the original Scout Law be re-written, becoming-

- A Scout does his best to honour his promise.
- A Scout is to be trusted.
- A Scout is loyal.
- A Scout is friendly and considerate.
- A Scout is a brother to all Scouts.
- A Scout has courage in all difficulties.
- A Scout makes good use of his time and is careful of possessions and property.
- A Scout has respect for himself and others.

5 That a new training and advancement scheme be introduced.
6 All Sections should use the same Scout salute.
7 That "Be Prepared" be the motto for the whole Scout Movement.
8 That the minimum age for entry into the Scout Movement be 8 years, with no pre-Cub training.
9 That the maximum age for membership of a Training Section of the Movement be 20 years.
10 That there be three Training Sections in the Movement;

- Cub Scouts (ages 8 to 11)
- Scouts (ages 11 to 16)
- Venture Scouts (ages 16 to 20)

11 That Scout Troops of approximately 36 members be formed by amalgamation or pooling of resources of smaller troops.
12 That the registration of Lone Scouts be discontinued.
13 That a set of minimum standards be introduced, with Groups failing to meet these standards being closed;

- Minimum number of young people (Cub Scouts: 12, Scout Troop: 12, Venture Scouts: 9)
- Minimum number of leaders (At least 2 adults for each section)
- Minimum level of progress made by members of each section
- Appropriate programme being operated by each section

14 That a maximum age-limit for Scouters and Commissioners be introduced.
15 That there be an increase in the number of paid Scouters.
16 That shorts will only be worn as part of the uniform by members of the Cub Scout section.

== Implementation ==
The Boy Scouts Association published Design for Scouting, outlining which of The Chief Scout's Advance Party Report 1966 recommendations had been accepted by its Committee of the Council. Only a few of the proposals were amended. Notably, it was decided against the deletion of "On my honour" from the Scout Promise; this obviated the need for the first of the proposed eight Scout Laws, leaving only seven. The suggestion that the Wood Badge insignia (for adult leader training) be replaced by a cloth emblem was also not adopted. The first changes to be implemented were the adoption of the new Laws and Promises in October 1966 followed, in May 1967, by the formal name change from The Boy Scouts Association to The Scout Association. In October of that year, the new uniform was introduced along with the new training schemes, including the launch of the Venture Scout section. The most apparent and impacting changes were:

- the discontinuation of Rovers.
- change from the iconic scout uniform items of wide-brimmed felt Scout hat and shorts to less utilitarian dress uniforms.
- a loss of distinction of Wolf Cubs and merging of their identity in name, badges, belt buckle emblem, salute, motto, promise and program to be Cub Scouts.

Less apparent but of impact were:

- forced amalgamations and de-registrations of Scout Groups.
- forced retirement ages for volunteer adult leaders.
- increased paid staff against a tradition and ideals of volunteer leadership.
- abandonment of long-used awards for entirely new schemes.
- shift in ideology and values e.g. changes to Promises and use of generalisations in the Scout Law.

== Outcomes ==
Such radical changes were not welcomed by all Scout Association supporters and many relinquished positions, with loss and even disaffection, particularly of longer-term leaders and supporters, some joining alternate Scout organisations such as the British Boy Scouts and European Scout Federation (British Association) and some Scout groups and Rover crews becoming independent or forming new Scout associations.

=== Opposition and schism ===
Front cover of the Boy Scout Black Paper

The Scout Action Group formed in response to the Advance Party Report and, in 1970, published A Boy Scout Black Paper, providing alternative proposals for the future of the Scout Association and asking for Scout Groups that wished to continue to follow Baden-Powell's original schemes to be allowed to do so. These proposals were not accepted by the Scout Association, resulting in a schism in the organisation and the formation of the Baden-Powell Scouts' Association, a Traditional Scouting organisation.

The front cover of A Boy Scout Black Paper features a photograph of a Southeast London Scout Group which, it was claimed, was forced to close under the Advance Party Report as the leader was aged 65 and no replacement leader was available. The Paper concludes with a copy of a letter from the Scout Association's North and Central Lambeth Council refusing to re-register the Group and therefore forcing its closure.

=== Continued decline in older enrolments and shift to younger ages ===
Overall numbers continued to reduce until the Scout Association's annual census of 31 March 1969 (18 months after the implementation of the Report) showed modest increases across two sections of the Association. The total of 531,011 included 249,561 Cub Scouts, 188,379 Scouts and 21,698 Venture Scouts in 11,704 Scout Groups. The association's total number of young people within the reduced Statutory Youth Service age range of 14 to 21 was over 81,000. The Advance Party Report failed to recover the losses of older boys, with 55,206 Senior Scouts and Rover Scouts recorded in 1966 having been replaced by just 21,698 Venture Scouts in the 1969 figures. The highest recorded membership of the Venture Scout section was 39,307 in 1989 (after the 1976 admission of girls into the Venture Scout section). By March 1978, a decade after implementation, the overall Scout Association total had risen to 636,148, including 308,152 Cub Scouts, 207,276 Scouts and 27,905 Venture Scouts (of whom, 2,218 were girls). The number of Scout Groups had fallen to 11,464, reflecting the policy of amalgamating smaller units which had been proposed by the Advance Party. Many of the Advance Party Report changes, such as dropping the word "Boy" from "Boy Scout" were aimed at changing the Scout Association's juvenile image but the changes did not increase recruitment in older ages and, more significantly, failed to slow turnover rates to increase retention periods and turnover rates of leaders increased. By 1998 the majority (68%) of members of The Scout Association were under 11 years old.

=== Further reviews ("Change begets change") ===
Since the Advance Party Report, the Scout Association has carried out further reviews of its training schemes with increasing rapidity, some continuing but others contrary and some even effectively reversing recommendations to the Advance Party Report. However, the Association has avoided such a widespread and fundamental review and making as many changes as with the Advance Party Report. A new training scheme and progress awards for the Scout section were launched in April 1985, Against the recommendations of Advance Party Report, the Beaver Scout section for 6 and 7 year olds was launched in April 1986 after a trial scheme and in February 1990, it was decided in principle that the Association would become fully co-educational. A new training scheme for Cub Scouts was launched in September 1990. In May 2000, The Programme Review was received by the Scout Association's Committee of the Council after extensive consultation within the Association and with focus groups. A uniform review was conducted shortly afterwards. New uniforms were launched during London Fashion Week in 2001 and implementation of the new training programmes began in 2002. This included splitting Ventures back into two sections, Explorer Scouts (14−18) and Scout Network (18−25); effectively restoring the pre-Advance Party Report age ranges by December 2003.

== See also ==
- Baden-Powell's Scout training scheme

== Bibliography ==
- The Advance Party Report '66 Popular Edition. The Boy Scouts Association. 1966.
- A Boy Scout Black Paper. Scout Action Group. 1970.
- The Advance Party Report viewable online
- The Chief Scout's Advance Party decisions (PDF)
