= European Scout Federation (British Association) =

- Headquarters: England
- Country: United Kingdom
- Founded: 1959
- Membership: 459
- National Commissioner: Anthony Gouldthorp
- Affiliation: Confédération Européenne de Scoutisme
- Website; F.S.E. (British Association)

The European Scout Federation (British Association) is a Traditional Scouting youth organisation. It is a part of the other Scouting in the United Kingdom. Original test work set out by Robert Baden-Powell is still used. The original uniform is still evident today, broad brimmed hats, khaki shirts and shorts, making the wearer instantly recognisable as a Scout.

== History ==
The European Scout Federation (British Association) is one of the organisations that founded the CES after leaving the Fédération du Scoutisme Européen (FSE), later renamed to the Union Internationale des Guides et Scouts d'Europe. The badge of the association consists of a gold fleur-de-Lys on a red cross pattée, with a blue background, the old badge of the FSE.

== Sections ==
Section	Ages	Part of	Activities	Formed
Otter Colony	5–7	Group	Always busy and bright.	1987
Wolf Cub Pack	7–10½	Group	A Scout in Training.	1916
Scout Troop	10½–16	Group	For the advancement of Scouting skills.	1907
Rover Crew	16–No upper limit	Group	Emphasis on Service and adventure.	1918
Ranger Crew	16–No upper limit	Group	Emphasis on Service and adventure.	1974

== Membership ==
As of 2015, the organisation had a total membership of 516 people. These included:

- Otters: 67
- Cubs: 190
- Scouts: 126
- Rovers: 82
- Leaders: 47
- Adult members: 4
