= Outdoor Service Guides =

Inclusive, co-ed scouting organization in the United States

- Headquarters: Washington, DC
- Country: United States
- Founded: 2006
- Membership: 1,500
- Chief Commissioner: Liz Kelly-Campanale
- Affiliation: World Federation of Independent Scouts
- Website outdoorserviceguides.org
- Pathfinder (11-17); Neckerchief color and pattern is unique to each individual group in OSG.

Outdoor Service Guides (OSG) (formerly known as the Baden-Powell Service Association (BPSA)) is an inclusive, co-ed scouting organization in the United States of America. OSG accepts scouts without regard to gender, gender identity, race, sexual orientation, economic circumstances, religion (or lack of), or other differentiating factors. OSG seeks to welcome communities who have been traditionally underserved by Scouting, including LGBTQIA+, BIPOC and females.

== History ==
Outdoor Service Guides was formed under its original name with an adult-only component, Rovers, in 2006. Youth sections were introduced in 2008 by Veronica Atchley (frmly., David Atchley), an Eagle Scout in the Boy Scouts of America, who had been asked to leave his local Greater St. Louis Area Council after attempting to create a non-discrimination policy for his Cub Scout pack. Atchley became commissioner of BPSA the following year.

By 2011, the association had a handful of units. BPSA reincorporated in 2012 and added 35 more groups between 2011 and July 2013. In January 2013, a chapter was founded in Brooklyn, New York with 45 members, while a group in Portland, Oregon with 80 members and 30 registered leaders was founded that same month. In 2014, after a Seattle, Washington United Methodist Church’s Boy Scout troop charter was revoked for having a gay leader, the troop moved to join BPSA.

As of February 2020, BPSA had 70 operating groups and a membership of approximately 2,500 scouts. This was an increase from 1,600 in April 2016.

On June 28, 2020, BPSA held a meeting of invested members and leaders, and concluded that the organization needed a change of name to distance itself from the imperialism and cultural superiority perceived in Baden-Powell's legacy. A new name (Outdoor Service Guides or OSG) was chosen and announced on May 29, 2021.

== Program ==
Outdoor Service Guides is part of the worldwide Traditional Scouting movement designed to return Scouting to the basic principles laid out by Baden-Powell in 1907.

An OSG scout group is composed of up to five sections as follows:

- Chipmunks (ages 2 to 4)
- Otters (ages 5 to 8)
- Timberwolves (8 to 11)
- Pathfinders (11 to 17)
- Rovers (18+)

Each section is led by a section leader and assistant section leaders (who are also Rover scouts themselves), and the group is led by a Group Scoutmaster (also a Rover) and supported by an Auxiliary Committee, which assists the group in matters of finance, registrations, acquiring equipment, finding community-service opportunities, publicity, and so on.

OSG's highest award for Pathfinders is the Polaris Scout Award. The highest award for Rovers is the Baden-Powell Award.

OSG Otters and Timberwolves use a two finger salute same as Cub Scouts.
