= Traditional Scouting =

Informal educational system used by Scouts

Traditional Scouting is "old-fashioned" or "back to basics" Scouting in some form, often with an emphasis on woodcraft and scoutcraft activities. As a pluralist movement, there is no one set definition for the term, but most traditionalists share a common set of values and procedures. Traditionalists aim to return the Scout Movement to something approximating its original style and activities; rejecting the trend of modernizing the program in an attempt to widen its appeal and/or use the name "Scouts" for new programs for ever-younger children.

Baden-Powell traditionalists follow Robert Baden-Powell's model of Scouting or his book Scouting for Boys. Other traditionalists reject even Cubs and Rovers programs and organizational structures which were used by Baden-Powell as they are outside original Boy Scouts and Girl Scouts.

== History ==
The Scout Movement is a pluralist movement, not a unitary organization. The Scout Movement and its fundamental tenets were well established for both boys and girls internationally by 1910. Subsequently, some Scout organizations began other programs for younger children, such as Wolf Cubs. Robert Baden-Powell insisted that his Wolf Cubs were not junior Scouts and must have an identity and program distinct from Scouts but, later, the distinction was changed and they were re-branded as Cub Scouts. Some Scout organizations changed away from traditional Scout programs, schemes, ideals and identity.

=== United Kingdom ===
In the United Kingdom, there have been alternative Scout organizations since the origins of the movement, including the Boys' Brigade Scouts (1906–1927), Church Scout Patrols/Church Lads' Brigade Scouts (1909–1926), Boys' Life Brigade Scouts (1909–1922), British Boy Scouts (BBS) formed 1909, YMCA Boy Scouts formed 1908, 1st Notts Church Scouts (1908–1918), The Boy Scouts Association formed 1910, National Peace Scouts (1910–1922), Life Saving Scouts of the Salvation Army (1913–1949), Association of Independent Scout Troops (1920s), scouts in exile and diaspora groups such as Armenian Scouts, Plast Ukrainian Scouts, Lithuanian Scouts, Latvian Scouts, Estonian Scouts, Hungarian Scouts, Russian Scouts, and the European Scout Federation (British Association) (FSE) formed in 1959. The world's oldest international Scout organisation, the Order of World Scouts, predated the Boy Scouts Association's international alliance by nine years. The BBS and FSE are now associated with Traditional Scouting by virtue of their adherence to original tenets and programs. New groups also continue to form in the United Kingdom, including the Pathfinder Scouts Association in 1982.

Another form of Traditional Scouting is associated with rejection of changes made within The Scout Association from 1967 following The Chief Scouts' Advance Party Report 1966, which attempted to address declining participation numbers, particularly for older boys of Scout and Senior Scout ages and modernize the association's programs. The Boy Scouts Association, the largest Scout organization in the United Kingdom, made sweeping changes. The association dropped the word "Boy" from its name and from "Boy Scout" and discontinued the wearing of shorts by its Scouts because, it was claimed, they contributed to a juvenile image. The most apparent and impacting changes were:

- the discontinuation of Rovers.
- change from the iconic scout uniform items of wide-brimmed felt Scout hat and shorts to less utilitarian dress uniforms.
- a loss of distinction of Wolf Cubs and merging of their identity in name, badges, belt buckle emblem, salute, motto, promise and program to be Cub Scouts.

Less apparent but of impact were:

- discontinuation of Lone Scouts
- forced amalgamations and de-registrations of Scout Groups not meeting minimum enrolment numbers.
- forced retirement ages for volunteer adult leaders.
- increased paid staff against a tradition and ideals of volunteer leadership.
- abandonment of long-used awards and training programs for entirely new schemes.
- shift in ideology and values e.g. changes to Promises and use of generalisations in the Scout Law.

The changes caused a schism in The Scout Association resulting in the formation of the Baden-Powell Scouts' Association in 1970. Olave Baden-Powell, widow of Robert Baden-Powell, approved the use of the name.

=== North America ===
Traditional Scouting is followed in some groups in Canada and America, particularly among followers of Ernest Thompson Seton and Daniel Beard woodcraft and scoutcraft and where William Hillcourt was an advocate of B-P Traditional Scouting.

Traditional Scouting came to North America in 1996 with the founding of the Baden-Powell Scouts' Association of Canada (B-PSAC). Forced by Industry Canada to remove "Scout" from its name, the organization renamed itself the Baden-Powell Service Association.

In 2006, a group of independent Rovers in the United States formed an organization named "Baden-Powell Scouting" to promote Traditional Scouting. They were renamed the Baden-Powell Service Association (BPSA-US) in 2008, and began offering youth programs shortly thereafter. In 2021, they renamed themselves the Outdoor Service Guides.

== Scheme ==
Traditional Scouting is often based on sources used by early Scouts such as Robert Baden-Powell's book Scouting for Boys, Ernest Thompson Seton's The Birch Bark Roll and Daniel Carter Beard's The Boy Pioneers: Sons of Daniel Boone, making changes only for advances in health and safety practices, environmental concerns ("Leave No Trace"), and lightweight equipment.

Traditional Scouting uses a Scout Method of progressive self-education through:

- Having a Scout uniform, Promise, and Law;
- Learning by doing (hands-on training);
- The Patrol System – Scouts work in small, youth-led groups where they are responsible to and for each other;
- A progressive and stimulating program of varied activities based on the interests of the participants, including games, useful skills, and services in the community, and all taking place largely in an outdoor setting in contact with nature

=== Differences ===
There are several differences between Traditional Scouting and non-traditionalists:

- The Patrol Method is central; groups are youth-led with adults providing only the minimum amount of supervision.
- Uniform – The uniform is designed to be used as a practical outdoor method, rather than as expensive indoor clothing for "formal occasions." The uniform should be a joy to wear in the wilderness. Some groups use a traditional uniform style, with campaign hat, as Baden-Powell's original Scouts did. They also may wear square neckerchiefs; the extra material means the neckers are not just decorative but have additional practical uses.
- All leaders and association officials are volunteers, with no paid staff.
- Badges reflect proficiency in skills, not one-off accomplishments, and Scouts are re-tested every year to demonstrate their continued proficiency in order to keep wearing the badges they have earned.
- Scouts practice and display their proficiency by teaching younger Scouts in their Patrol.
- Badges are earned in Scoutcraft, woodcraft and public service. There are no badges for technology or other modern topics.
- Advancement is based strictly on the mastery of Scoutcraft skills and Proficiency Badges: There are no Scout spirit, Scoutmaster conference, or Board of Review requirements. Traditional Scouting is analogous to a game played to teach Citizenship strictly through indirect methods.
- Traditional Scout associations often support both Rovers and Lone Scouts.
- Modernist Scouting sees itself as anything done by a worldwide organization whereas Traditional Scouting is seen as a popular movement following a specific scheme.
- Modernist Scouting involves ever younger age groups and increased adult involvement and family activities.

== International organizations ==
The constitution of the World Organization of the Scout Movement recognizes only one Scout organization per country to protect its founding members, so Traditional Scouting associations had to form alternate international organizations to foster cooperation across national borders. The Order of World Scouts has existed since 1911 and is the oldest international Scout organization with Traditional Scouting member organizations. The World Federation of Independent Scouts (WFIS) and its spin-off World Organization of Independent Scouts WOIS were founded following 1960-70s changes and schisms, to coordinate international cooperation between Traditional Scouting organizations.

== Inclusivity ==
Some Traditional Scouting groups are distinguished from Baden-Powell's model and organizations by being open to groups of people originally excluded. The British Boy Scouts and British Girl Scouts Association was one of the first to admit girls and host co-educational troops. More recently, other groups have formed specifically to welcome gay and lesbian Scouts and leaders banned from other Scouting organizations. The BPSA-US, since its founding, has promoted a policy it calls "Inclusive Scouting", welcoming all adults and children "regardless of race, gender identity, sexual orientation, class, ability, religion (or no religion), or other differentiating factors."

== See also ==
- Non-aligned Scouting and Scout-like organisations
- World Federation of Independent Scouts
- Confédération Européenne de Scoutisme
