= Scout Promise =

Oath made when joining the Scout movement

Scout Promise or Scout Oath
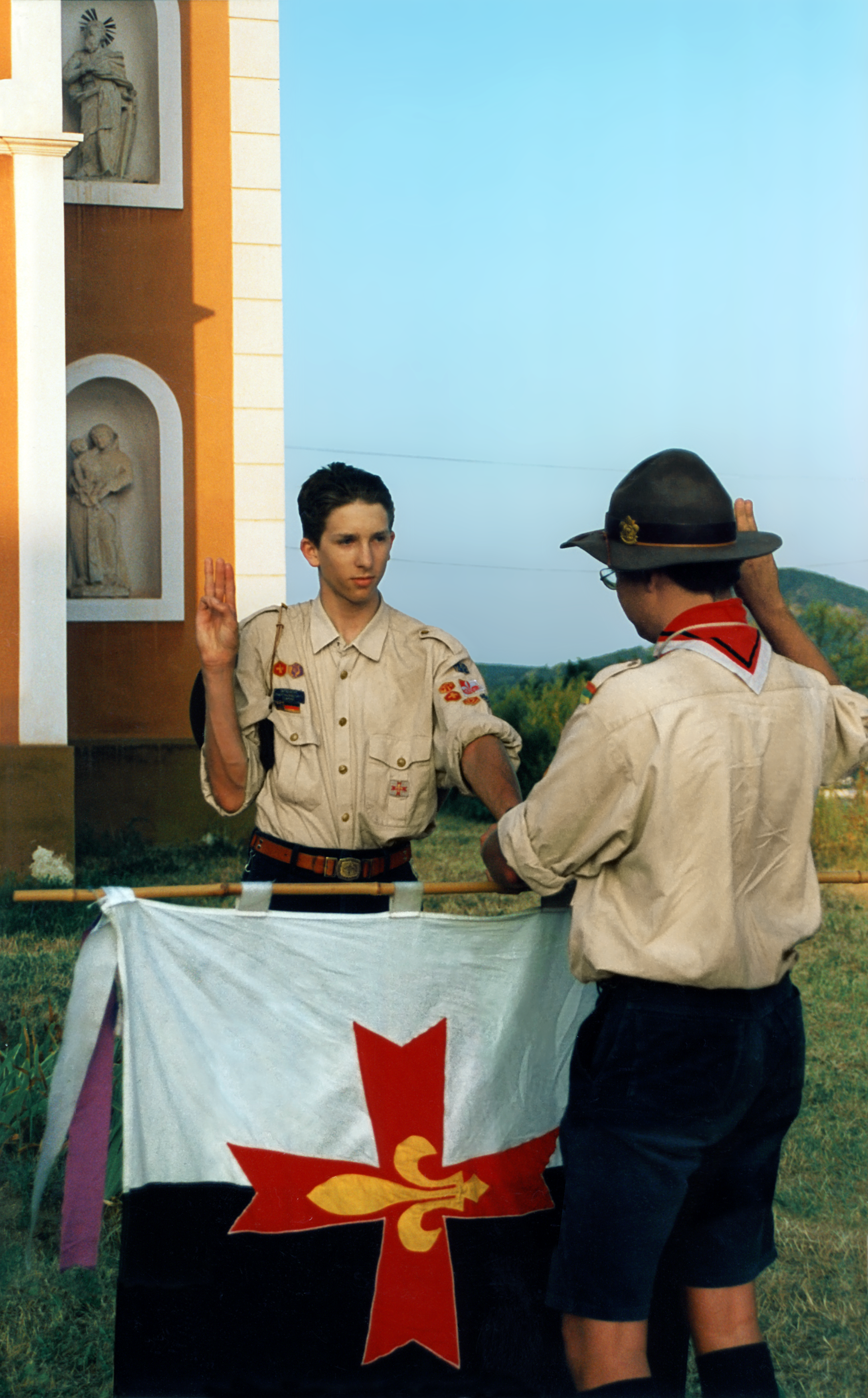
- German Scouts of the Federation Scout Europe at a 1992 Scout Promise ceremony at the St. George's mountain near the Lake Balaton in Hungary
- Founded: 1908

The Scout Promise (or Oath) is a declaration made by a person joining the Scout movement. Since the publication of Scouting for Boys in 1908, all Scouts and Girl Guides around the world have taken a Scout (or Guide) promise or oath to live up to ideals of the movement, and subscribed to a Scout Law. The wording of the Scout Promise and Scout Law have varied slightly over time and from country to country. Although most Scouting and Guiding organizations use the word "promise", a few, such as the Boy Scouts of America, tend to use "oath" instead.

Typically, Scouts and Guides will make the three-fingered salute when reciting the promise.

== Original 1908 text ==
In his original book on Boy Scouting, Robert Baden-Powell introduced the Scout Promise, as follows:

Before he becomes a scout, a boy must take the scout's oath, thus:

"On my honour I promise that—
1. I will do my duty to God and the King.
2. I will do my best to help others, whatever it costs me.
3. I know the Scout Law, and will obey it."

While taking this oath, the scout will stand, holding his right hand raised level with his shoulder, palm to the front, thumb resting on the nail of the little finger and the other three fingers upright, pointing upwards:—

This is the scout's salute and secret sign.

== World Organization of the Scout Movement requirements ==
The form of the promise has varied slightly from country to country and over time, but must fulfill the requirements of the World Organization of the Scout Movement (WOSM) to qualify a National Scout Organization for membership. Together with clarifying its Scout Law, the Constitution of WOSM states:

Article II, paragraph 2: "Adherence to a Promise and Law"

All members of the Scout Movement are required to adhere to a Scout Promise and Law reflecting, in language appropriate to the culture and civilization of each National Scout Organization and approved by the World Organization, the principles of Duty to God, Duty to others and Duty to self, and inspired by the Promise and Law originally conceived by the Founder of the Scout Movement in the following terms:

The Scout Promise

On my honour I promise that I will do my best—
To do my duty to God and the King (or to God and my Country);
To help other people at all times;
To obey the Scout Law.

In order to accommodate many different religions within Scouting, "God" may refer to a higher power, and is not specifically restricted to the God of the monotheistic religions. The WOSM Constitution explains "Duty to God" as "Adherence to spiritual principles, loyalty to the religion that expresses them and acceptance of the duties resulting therefrom."

The World Association of Girl Guides and Girl Scouts (WAGGGS), which is a sister organization to WOSM, has the same wording in its constitution (Part 4, Paragraph 2: Original Promise), and follows similar policies.

In 2014, the WOSM passed a resolution, "Spirituality in Scouting", recognizing the importance of spirituality, but without defining it with the word "God". The WOSM then convened a 2015 "Duty to God" task force, which in turn produced another draft resolution to be considered at the WOSM 2017 conference. The final 2017 resolution passed indicated a need for further investigation, and for WOSM to take into consideration a member organization's "culture and civilization" if asked to approve changes to their Promise or Law. Conversely, a member organization was asked to consider the global movement and its goals if it requested alternative wording.

=== Alternative promises ===
Although the Constitution of WOSM states that the Promise should include a reference to Duty to God, Scouting founder Lord Baden-Powell approved the use of promises with reference to a higher ideal, higher truth, an optional reference to God, or without a reference to God, for Belgium, Czechoslovakia, France, Luxembourg, the Netherlands, and Finland. Four of these countries still offer this alternative promise (France, the Netherlands, Belgium and Czech Republic). WOSM stated in 1932 that no new exceptions would be made and expressed the hope that the few remaining countries would stop using a promise without any reference to Duty to God.

The Israeli Scouts, though founded in 1919/1920, and joining WOSM in 1951 and WAGGGS in 1963, also have no "duty to God" or apparent equivalent in their promise. Adat HaTzofim, the religious Jewish Scouts in Israel, do have "duty to God" in their promise.

In 1969, the Eclaireuses et Eclaireurs israélites de France decided to discontinue using the reference to God due to its inconsistency with religious beliefs and practices from a Jewish perspective. Use of the word God (Dieu), derived from Zeus, can be seen as an inappropriate pagan reference in Jewish texts or education.

In the late 20th and early 21st centuries, some WOSM and WAGGGS affiliated organizations have introduced alternative promises for their programs, giving adherents a choice. Examples include Scouterna (Sweden), Scouts Australia, and Scouts Canada.

== Non-WOSM Scouting ==
Scout sections that follow traditional Scouting, such as Baden-Powell Scouts within the World Federation of Independent Scouts, use several promises including the original Scout promise above that includes the reference to God. Some, however, for example the 1st Tarrant Scout Group in Fort Worth, Texas use a blend of the original promise and the "Outlander Promise" which, "according to tradition", B-P wrote for Scouts that had to omit the reference to God or a monarch for reasons of conscience.

== See also ==
- Religion in Scouting
- Scouting
