= Scout Law =

Promise or oath of the Boy Scouts

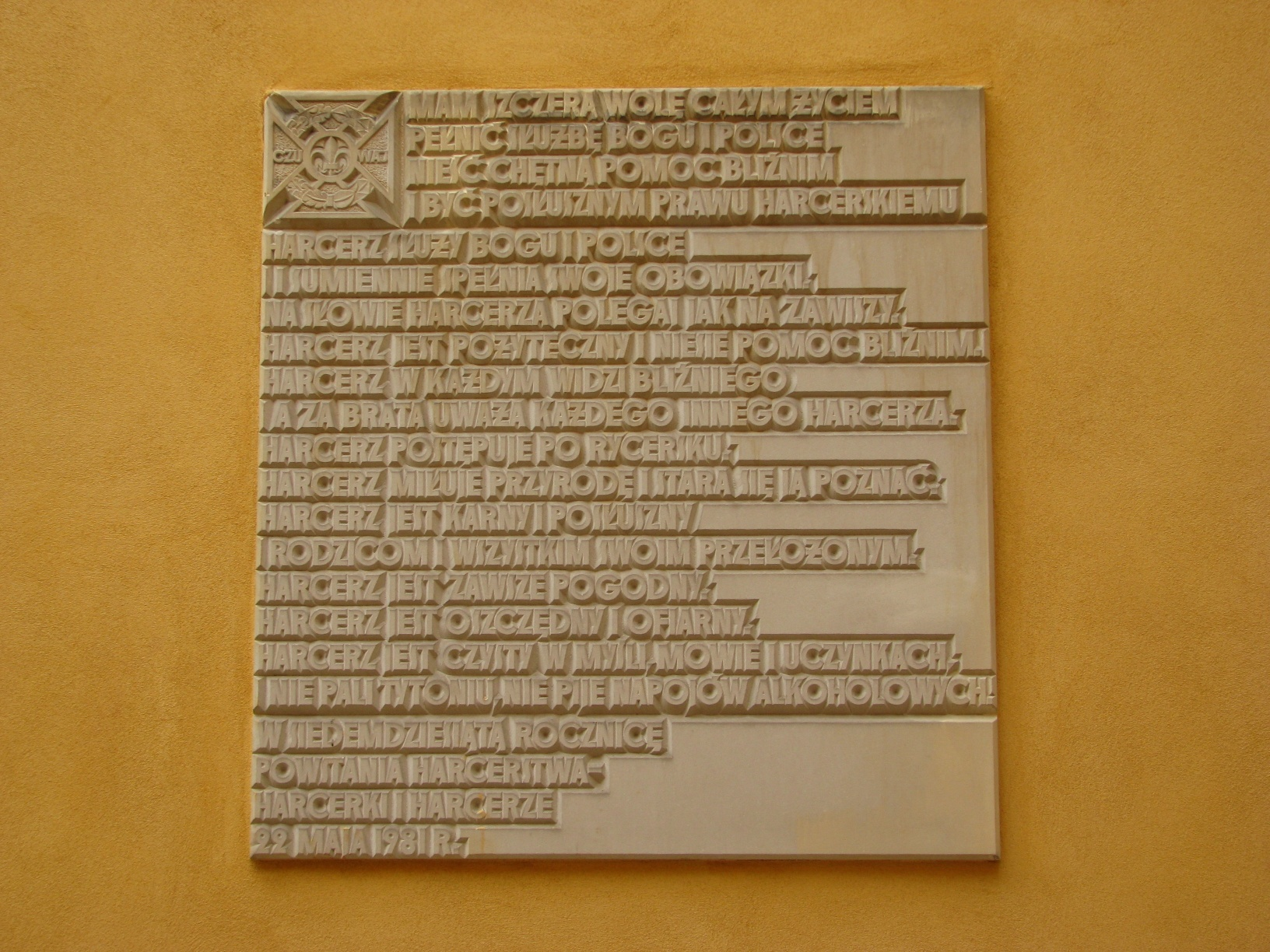
- Polish Scout Law – St. Martin's church in Warsaw, Poland

Scout Law is a set of codes in the Scout movement. Since the publication of Scouting for Boys in 1908, all Scouts and Guides around the world have taken a Scout Promise or oath to live up to the ideals of the movement and have subscribed to the Scout Law. The wording of the promise and law have varied over time and among Scouting organizations.

== History ==
The origin of the Scout Law derives from the parallel and closely connected development of the North American and British youth outdoor programs. When writing Scouting for Boys, General Baden-Powell drew inspiration from the work of Ernest Thompson Seton, who had founded the Woodcraft Indians in Canada and the U.S. in 1902, and who later was instrumental in spreading Scouting throughout North America. Based on encouragement from Seton in 1904, Baden-Powell began forming his Boy Scouts in England. Seton's laws in his 1907 Woodcraft guide (The Birch-Bark Roll) seem unrelated to the Scout Law, being more a list of practical injunctions e.g., "Don't rebel," "Don't kindle a wild fire," etc.) than the affirmative, high-minded ideals of the eventual Scouting version. Still, this primitive form was the source of the idea of a set of codes.

The first list resembling the current form appeared in Baden-Powell's 1908 Scouting for Boys. So far, it is unclear to what degree Seton and Baden-Powell collaborated in developing the nine essential points common to nearly all worldwide scouting programs. The Boy Scouts of America's 1910 version was virtually identical to the original nine British points of 1908, and the BSA's Handbook for Boys (1911), Seton's admixture of Scouting for Boys and his own Woodcraft guides, uses these nine. By 1912 Seton's The Book of Woodcraft studied the qualities of Native American Indians using a list identical to the 12 points of the 1911 U.S. Scout Law, only in reverse order, indicating the parallel development of the two manuscripts. Similarly, Seton's formulation years later of a 12-point Woodcraft law was much closer to the current U.S. Scout Law and even more elaborate (cf. his Fourfold Fire and Sandpainting of the Fire in Woodland Tales). Somewhere during this period, Scouting programs in the British Isles and colonies added a 10th point regarding spiritual and bodily cleanliness similar to Seton's 11th point.

According to the original U.S. handbook, which elaborated on the British version, the founders drew inspiration for the Scout Law from the Bushido code of the Japanese Samurai (Baden-Powell and Seton), laws of honor of the American Indians (Seton), the code of chivalry of European knights (Baden-Powell), and the Zulu fighters Baden-Powell had fought against (Baden-Powell).

== Scout Law ==
"The Scout Law"
Boy Scouts of America 1910
Read by James Christopher for LibriVox
Audio 00:05:63 (full text pg. 32)

The original Scout law appeared with the publication of Scouting for Boys in 1908 and is as follows (sic, capitalization, numbering, etc. by Baden-Powell):

1. A SCOUT'S HONOUR IS TO BE TRUSTED. If a scout says "On my honour it is so," that means it is so, just as if he had taken a most solemn oath. Similarly, if a scout officer says to a scout, "I trust you on your honour to do this," the Scout is bound to carry out the order to the very best of his ability, and to let nothing interfere with his doing so. If a scout were to break his honour by telling a lie, or by not carrying out an order exactly when trusted on his honour to do so, he would cease to be a scout, and must hand over his scout badge and never be allowed to wear it again.
2. A SCOUT IS LOYAL to the King, and to his officers, and to his country, and to his employers. He must stick to them through thick and thin against anyone who is their enemy, or who even talks badly of them.
3. A SCOUT'S DUTY IS TO BE USEFUL AND TO HELP OTHERS. And he is to do his duty before anything else, even though he gives up his own pleasure, or comfort, or safety to do it. When in difficulty to know which of two things to do, he must ask himself, "Which is my duty?" that is, "Which is best for other people?" – and do that one. He must Be Prepared at any time to save life, or to help injured persons. And he must do a good turn to somebody every day.
4. A SCOUT IS A FRIEND TO ALL, AND A BROTHER TO EVERY OTHER SCOUT, NO MATTER TO WHAT SOCIAL CLASS THE OTHER BELONGS. If a scout meets another scout, even though a stranger to him, he must speak to him, and help him in any way that he can, either to carry out the duty he is then doing, or by giving him food, or, as far as possible, anything that he may be in want of. A scout must never be a SNOB. A snob is one who looks down upon another because he is poorer, or who is poor and resents another because he is rich. A scout accepts the other man as he finds him, and makes the best of him – "Kim," the boy scout, was called by the Indians "Little friend of all the world," and that is the name which every scout should earn for himself.
5. A SCOUT IS COURTEOUS: That is, he is polite to all – but especially to women and children and old people and invalids, cripples, etc. And he must not take any reward for being helpful or courteous.
6. A SCOUT IS A FRIEND TO ANIMALS. He should save them as far as possible from pain, and should not kill any animal unnecessarily, even if it is only a fly – for it is one of God's creatures.
7. A SCOUT OBEYS ORDERS of his patrol-leader, or scout master without question. Even if he gets an order he does not like, he must do as soldiers and sailors do, he must carry it out all the same because it is his duty; and after he has done it he can come and state any reasons against it: but he must carry out the order at once. That is discipline.
8. A SCOUT SMILES AND WHISTLES under all circumstances. When he gets an order, he should obey it cheerily and readily, not in a slow, hang-dog sort of way. Scouts never grouse at hardships, nor whine at each other, nor swear when put out. When you just miss a train, or some one treads on your favourite corn – not that a scout ought to have such things as corns – or under any annoying circumstances, you should force yourself to smile at once, and then whistle a tune, and you will be all right. A scout goes about with a smile on and whistling. It cheers him and cheers other people, especially in time of danger, for he keeps it up then all the same. The punishment for swearing or bad language is for each offence a mug of cold water to be poured down the offender's sleeve by the other scouts.
9. A SCOUT IS THRIFTY, that is, he saves every penny he can, and puts it in the bank, so that he may have money to keep himself when out of work, and thus not make himself a burden to others; or that he may have money to give away to others when they need it.

== Editions ==
These were written for the Scouts in the whole world, yet of course first focused on Scouting in the United Kingdom. As other groups started up Scouting organizations (often in other countries), each modified the laws, for instance 'loyal to the King' would be replaced by alternative text appropriate for each country.

During the years, Baden-Powell himself edited the text numerous times, notably in 1911 adding:

- A SCOUT IS CLEAN IN THOUGHT, WORD AND DEED. Decent Scouts look down upon silly youths who talk dirt, and they do not let themselves give way to temptation, either to talk it or to do anything dirty. A Scout is pure, and clean-minded, and manly.

A version of the Guide law, hand-written by Baden-Powell, is displayed at Foxlease Park in Hampshire.

== See also ==
- List of Scout Laws by country
