= Youth organizations in the United States =

Youth organizations in the United States are of many different types. The largest is the government run 4-H program, followed by the federally chartered but private Scouting groups: Scouting America and the Girl Scouts of the USA. Another somewhat smaller co-ed Scouting group is Camp Fire. Other youth groups are religious youth ministries such as the evangelical Christian Awana, Seventh-day Adventist Pathfinders, and Assemblies of God Royal Rangers.

Smaller Scout-like groups include the Christian Trail Life USA (for boys), American Heritage Girls (for girls), the non-denominational co-ed Navigators USA and Baden-Powell Service Association, and pagan but non-discriminatory SpiralScouts International.

There are also two types of Masonic Youth groups called International Order of the Rainbow for Girls and Job's Daughters International. Other popular youth programs include school groups and student organizations such as National Beta Club, Key Club, FBLA, FCCLA, FFA, Gay-Straight Alliance, and National High School Rodeo Association. Historical and hereditary youth organizations include the Children of the American Revolution and the Children of the Confederacy.

== Earth Scouting ==
Earth Scouting or Scout-like groups, also called Green Scouting, are those that are eco-oriented groups.

=== Earth Champs ===
Earth Champs
- Owner: Earth Charter US
- Age range: 3-13
- Founded: 2002
- Website http://www.sbctampabay.org/

Earth Champs is an independent non-denominational Scout-like organization, a program of the Sustainable Business Coalition of Tampa Bay, Inc.

Earth Scouts was founded in 2002. The BSA owning the trademark to "Scouts" forced Earth Scouts to change their name a decade later to Earth Champs. By July 2013, four chapters were operational with four more at the start-up level.

The Earth Champs program aims to get children interested and involved in activities that support the environment and living sustainably.

=== Kids for Earth ===
Kids for Earth
- Owner: United for Earth
- Age range: 6-18
- Headquarters: Hillsdale, New Jersey
- Founded: 2009
- Founder: Aditi Sen
- Website www.kidsforearth.org

Kids for Earth is an independent non-denominational secular eco-focused Scout-like organization.

Kids for Earth was founded in 2009 by Aditi Sen after watching An Inconvenient Truth.

== Historical societies ==
There are multiple historical and lineage societies for children in the United States, under the governance of the Hereditary Society Community of the United States of America.

=== Children of the American Colonists ===
The National Society Children of the American Colonists (NSCAC) is a youth lineage and hereditary society associated with and supported by the National Society Daughters of the American Colonists and the National Society Sons of the American Colonists. The society is for children who can prove their descent from residents of Colonial America who rendered civil or military service prior to July 4, 1776. Their focus is on patriotic and educational objectives and preserving colonial heritage.

=== Children of the American Revolution ===
the NSCAR Headquarters inside Memorial Continental Hall in Washington, D.C.

The National Society Children of the American Revolution (NSCAR) was founded in 1895 for children who can prove their direct descent from a patriot of the American Revolution. It is supported by three parent organizations: the Daughters of the American Revolution, the Sons of the American Revolution, and the Sons of the Revolution. The society teaches children leadership skills, volunteerism, American history, and patriotism. The society places historical markers and commemorative plaques, supports active military personnel and veterans, supports first responders, and preserves and teaches American history. The society also partners with its parent organizations to present debutantes from among its membership.

=== Children of the Confederacy ===
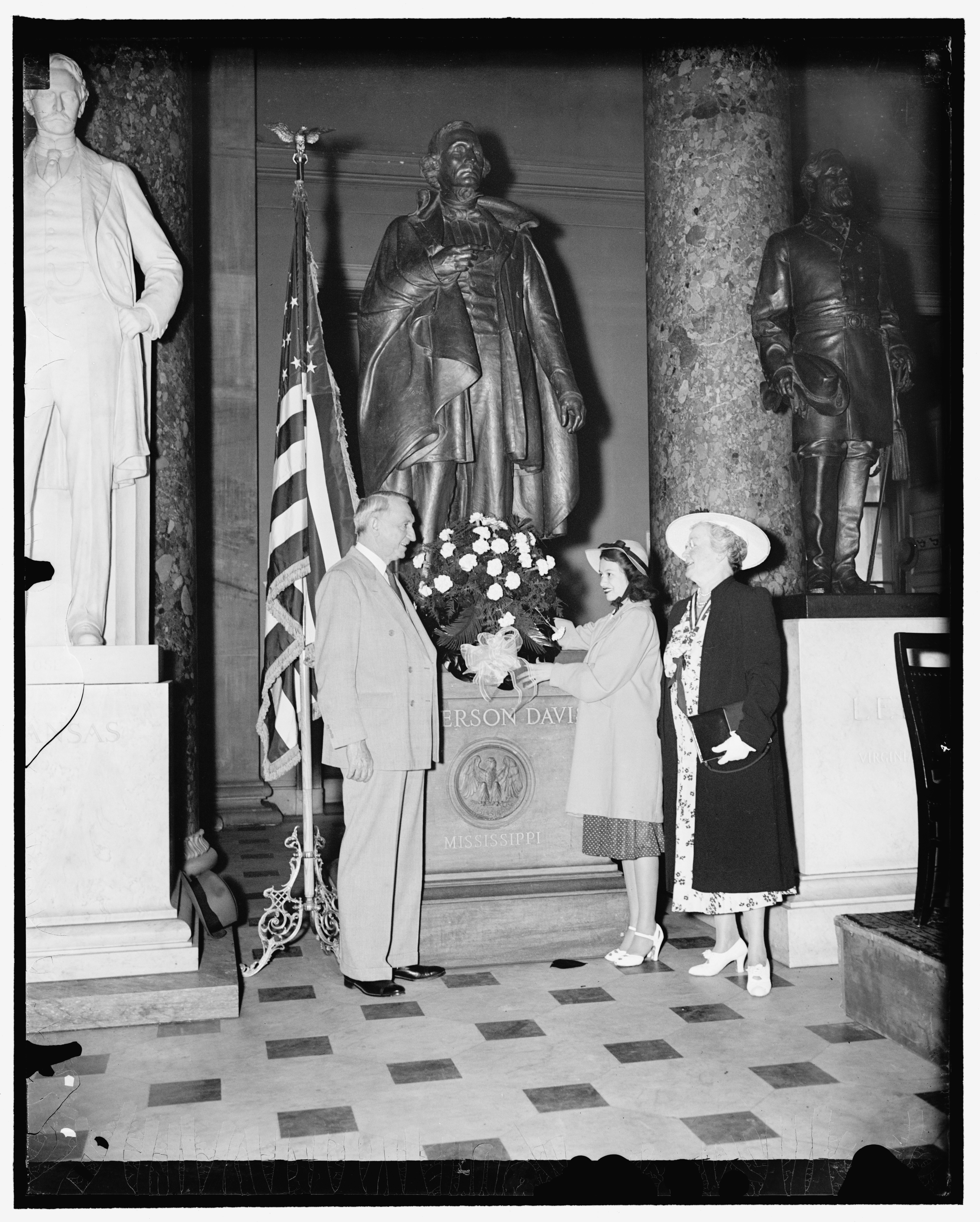
CofC member laying a wreath at the Statue of Jefferson Davis at the United States Capitol

The Children of the Confederacy (CofC) is a coed lineage society and hereditary association for children and teenagers who are descendants of people who rendered military or civil service to the Confederate States of America during the American Civil War. It operates as the children's auxiliary of the United Daughters of the Confederacy. The organization organizes field trips to historic Civil War and Confederate sites, organizes visits to veterans' hospitals, supports active duty military personnel, promotes Confederate and Southern history, offers scholarships, and hosts cemetery clean ups.

== Religious ==
=== Christian organizations ===
- American Heritage Girls, Trinitarian Christian scouting organization for girls
- Trail Life USA, Trinitarian Christian scouting organization

==== Catholic organizations ====
===== Columbian Squires =====
Columbian Squires
- Owner: Knights of Columbus
- Age range: 10-18
- Headquarters: New Haven
- Location: US, Mexico, Philippines
- Founded: August 4, 1925
- Founder: Barnabas McDonald
- Membership: 25,000; 1500 local units
- Website; Squires website

Squire Motto

Esto Dignus / Be Worthy

— BSA Troop 97

Columbian Squires is a Catholic boys' Scout-like organization run by the Knights of Columbus. The Squires considers itself to be an athletic team, social club, youth and civic improvement group, management training, civil rights group and spiritual development program.

====== Squires history ======
The Columbian Squires were begun in 1925. In December 2012, the Knights of Columbus was sued over supposed sexual abuse that had occurred in Brownsville, Texas by adult Columbian Squires leaders in the 1970s and 1980s. The bishop of the Diocese of Bismarck in August 2015 recommended the Squires as a replacement, along with two other organizations, for the BSA, as he directed parishes to disassociate from the BSA due to their recent approval of gay adult leaders.

The Knights of Columbus in January 2016 moved to have the parish youth program dictate whether a Boy Scout troop or a Squire Circle fits and have the parish sponsor the troop. No new circle were to be formed and inactive circle be dissolved.

====== Squires program ======
Local groups are called Circles. The program's five advancement levels are:

- Page
- Shield Bearer
- Swordsman
- Lancer
- Squire of the Body of Christ

===== Federation of North-American Explorers =====
Federation of North-American Explorers
- Location: Toronto, Ontario
- Country: Canada
- Founded: 1999
- Founder: Paul Ritchi
- General Commissioner: Paul Ritchi
- Affiliation: UISGE-FSE
- Website fneexplorers.com

The Federation of North-American Explorers (FNE) is a Catholic Scouting association in Canada and the United States of America. The association is a member of the International Union of Guides and Scouts of Europe.

Timber Wolf Promise

I promise to do my best to be faithful to God, my country, and my parents, to keep the law of the Timber Wolf den, and to do a good turn for somebody every day.

— North Star FNE Group
The Explorer Law

1. An explorer's honour is to be trusted.
2. An explorer is loyal to his country, leaders, parents, and subordinates.
3. An explorer's duty is to serve others.
4. An explorer is a friend to all and a brother to every other explorer.
5. An explorer is courteous and chivalrous.
6. An explorer sees in nature God's creations; he loves plants and animals.
7. An explorer obeys proper orders and leaves nothing half-finished.
8. An explorer smiles and whistles under all difficulties.
9. An explorer is thrifty; he takes care of his own possessions and those of others.
10. An explorer is clean in thought, word, and deed.

— North Star FNE Group
Timber Wolf Laws

The wolf listens to the old wolves, the wolf respects himself and the other members of the den.

The timber wolf thinks of others first. The timber wolf opens his eyes and his ears. The timber wolf is always clean. The timber wolf always tells the truth. The timber wolf is always happy.

— North Star FNE Group

====== FNE history ======
Federation of North-American Explorers was founded in 1999 by current commissioner Paul Ritchi, who was a Scouts Canada volunteer but felt a lack of "the spiritual component to make it personally fulfilling." While doing research, he found information on the Federation of Scouts of Europe, an international organization of national Catholic Scouting associations. The first FNE group, the "Timber Wolves", was then started with Richi, another leader, and 10 boys, ages 8 to 12.

The bishop of the Diocese of Bismarck in August 2015 recommended FNE as a replacement, along with two other organizations, for the BSA, as he directed parishes to disassociate from the BSA due to their recent move to allow gay adult leaders.

====== FNE program ======
In addition to the usual camping trips, explorers go on pilgrimages, receive the sacraments and get hands-on religious education.

The Explorer Promise

On my honour, and with God's grace, I promise to do my best to serve God, my Church, and my country, to help others at all times, and to obey the Explorer law.

— North Star FNE Group

The age level groups are:

- Otters, six- and seven-year-olds
- Timber Wolves, eight to 12
- Explorers, ages 12 to 15
- Wayfarers, Explorer "graduates" and senior leaders of other Explorer sections

===== Kepha =====
Kepha
- The Brotherhood of the Iron Will
- Country: US
- Website kepharocks.com

Kepha is a Catholic boys' Scouting alternative organization in which the father also participates. The organization's name means "rock" in Greek.

====== Kepha program ======
5 Anchors

Apologetics, Brotherhood, Charity, Mortification and Prayer.

— Patheos

The Kepha program had monthly retreats and shared daily prayers for brotherhood. Member have 2 AM two-hour Eucharistic adoration called "Yawns For Jesus". They go camping but required cold showers for discipline. The service work they do includes visiting nursing homes and hospitals.

===== Troops of Saint George =====
Troops of Saint George
- Headquarters: Irving, Texas
- Country: US
- Founded: May 24, 2013
- Founder: Taylor Marshall
- Membership: ~58 troops
- Website troopsofsaintgeorge.org

Saint George Motto

Parati Semper / prepared always

— 1 Peter 3:15

The Troops of Saint George, briefly the Scouts of Saint George, is a Catholic boys' Scouting organization focusing on father-son camping and catechetics through outdoor experiences. The organization's "hard launch" took place on January 1, 2014.

====== TSG history ======
Saint George Law

1. Honor all men.
2. Love the brotherhood.
3. Fear God.
4. Honor the king.

— (1 Peter 2:17)

The formation of the Scouts of St. George was announced by Taylor Marshall in May 2013 in response to the BSA's changing its membership policies for same-sex attracted youth. The program was planned to be free, open-source, grassroots and a traditional Boy Scout program with no 501(c)3 non-profit status (so as to keep government interference to a minimum). By October, the Scouts of St. George was forced, due to the BSA's ownership of the "Scouts" trademark, to change its name to "Troops of St. George". The organization filed for 501(c)3 status around the same time.

====== TSG program ======
Saint George Oath

Set an example:
1. in speech (in verbo)
2. and conduct (in conversatione)
3. in love (in caritate)
4. in faith (in fide)
5. in purity (in castitate).

— (1 Timothy 4:12)

The program is under development with an expected parallel program to the BSA.

Their "Trinitarian Salute" is "three fingers of the right hand (index, middle, ring) out, and with the pinky and thumb joined signifying that the divine nature of Christ is joined to His human nature: fully God and fully man as taught at the Catholic Council of Chalcedon".

==== Protestant groups ====
- Epworth League – Methodist youth group founded in 1889
- First Priority – middle and high school evangelical Christian clubs founded in 1996
- Generation Joshua – Conservative Christian political group founded in 2003

===== Awana =====
AWANA
- Age range: 2-18
- Founded: 1950
- Affiliation: Awana International
- Website awana.org awanainternational.org

Awana is a coed, nondenominational, Christian, Scout-like organization. AWANA is an acronym for "Approved Workmen Are Not Ashamed" from 2 Timothy 2:15.

====== Awana history ======
Awana was founded in 1950 in Illinois. Originally, the organization would not affiliate a club with a church that belonged to the National Council of Churches, World Council of Churches, Pentecostal church or charismatic church. In 1995, AWANA lifted the restrictions.

The past Awana Pledge

I pledge allegiance to the Awana flag Which stands for the Awana clubs Whose goal is to reach boys and girls With the gospel of Christ and train them to serve Him.

— Crossview Baptist Church

====== Awana program ======
The program's age groups are:

- Puggles
- Cubbies (3–4 years old)
- Sparks (K-2nd grade)
- Truth & Training (3rd-5th grade)
- Trek (6th-8th grade)
- Journey 24-7 (9th-12th grade)

The AWANA holds various types of model racing events:

- AWANA Grand Prix is a wood car race, similar to a pinewood derby.
- AWANA Regatta or Sail On Night are boat races.
- Airplane Toss is held at Flying Higher Night, in which model airplanes are built with the participant's choice of material. Instead of a speed race there are awards for distance, aerobatics, and design.

===== Caravan =====
Caravan
- Owner: Church of the Nazarene
- Website caravan.nazarene.org

Caravan is a Christian Scout-like organization run by the Church of the Nazarene. With a first through sixth grade co-ed membership, the organization has 600 US clubs, which focus on church doctrine. There are also about 150 Boy Scouts of America troops affiliated with Nazarene churches.

====== Caravan history ======
One of Caravan's forerunners was started in the 1930s by LeRoy Haynes as Boy's Works. As it spread from church to church. the program was picked up in 1934 by Nazarene's Southern California district as its boys' program under Haynes direction. The next year, Girl's Works was started up under Jeanne Haynes. The Works programs spread past outside the district and were even promoted through a display at the 1936 General Assembly.

Rev. W. W. Clay, also in the 1930s, developed two Christian principles programs for kids: Bluebirds for young children and Pioneers for older children. With Rev. Milton Bunker, an Eagle Scout, Clay promoted these club programs and continued to develop them.

With inadequate materials and competing programs, the 1940 General Assembly formed a Commission on Boys' and Girls' Work that met from November 17–18 in Santa Cruz, California. The commission was composed of six western districts' representatives, three members of the commission on Boys' and Girls' Work, and two members of the Department of Church Schools. This Commission decided to replace the existing club programs with its own program. The Board of General Superintendents approved this commission's program, while a committee developed and wrote the books.

Caravan was started in 1946 with the release of the first Caravan book, Trailmarker, for boys ages 12 and up. Books that followed were Pathmarker (girls ages 12+), Signals (boys ages 9 to 11), and Signs (girls ages 9 to 11). That fall, the first official Nazarene Caravan club in the United States was started by Millington Church of the Nazarene in Michigan, under Rev. Bunker. In 1948, Bunker was appointed the first general director of Caravan. Carol Wordsworth of Youngstown, Ohio in October 1949 at a district Caravan Round-up was the first person to be granted the Phineas F. Brezee award. In 2005, the program was revised with the addition of the Core Values badges and modified or added skill badges.

====== Caravan program ======
Caravan's grade level groups are:

- Searchers (1-2)
- Explorers (3-4)
- Adventurers (5-6)

Adults leaders of a group are called guides. Earning badges is an optional part of this program.

The Milton Bunker Award is granted to Searchers who complete the necessary two-year requirements. The Phineas F. Brezee award, named after the Church of the Nazarene's founding pastor, is the highest award in Caravan. A member earns the award upon completion of eight core values studies, 16 Articles of Faith, 32 skill badges, four ministry projects and four missionary books. Additional awards, the Esther Carson Winans and Haldor Lillenas awards, are achievable using the requirements from the Brezee award.

===== Christian Service Brigade =====
Christian Service Brigade
- Owner: CSB Ministries
- Age range: 5-18
- Headquarters: Hamburg, New York
- Country: US, Canada
- Founded: 1937
- Founder: Joe Coughlin
- Website csbministries.org csbministries.ca

CSB Vision

Godly men who serve, lead and disciple each generation

—

Christian Service Brigade is an Evangelical Christian boys' Scout-like organization run by the CSB Ministries. The organization has chartered 300 units with members in the first through 12th grades, and works to build boys' character with an emphasis on the Bible. CSB is a partner of the GEMS Girls Clubs.

====== CSB history ======
Christian Service Brigade was established in 1937 by Joe Coughlin in Glen Ellyn, Illinois with a Methodist Sunday School sixth-grade boys' class in conjunction with Wheaton College's Christian Service Council. In 1939, an affiliated girls group was founded, Girls' Guild. Both groups received backing from Herbert J. Taylor's Christian Workers' Foundation starting in 1943. The Guild became Pioneer Girls in 1940 and remained a division of CSB until 1944.

====== CSB program ======
The Brigade is split into four age levels:

- Tadpoles (ages 4–5)
- Tree Climbers (ages 6–7)
- Stockade (ages 8–11)
- Battalion (ages 12–18)

The organization uses uniforms similar to the BSA. CSB runs a few shape and race events: the Shape N Race Derby wood car race for the Stockade level, and the Shape N Sail Derby boat race and Shape N Sled Derby, model sleds raced in a rain gutter packed with snow with a depression as a trail. The equivalent rank to the Boy Scouts' Eagle Scout is the rank of "Herald of Christ".

The CSB runs 11 camps:

- Stony Glen Camp, Madison, Ohio
- Wilderness Ridge Brigade Camp, Bastrop, Texas
- Camp Teepee Pole, Sundra, Alberta, Canada
- Sequoia Brigade Camp, Concord, California
- New England Frontier Camp, Lovell, Maine
- Camp Kaskitowa, Michigan
- Camp Nathanael, Minnesota
- Northern Frontier Camp, New York
- Hickory Hill Brigade Camp, New York
- Haycock Camping Ministries, Pennsylvania
- Hemlock Wilderness Brigade Camp, Wardensville, West Virginia

===== Dynamic Youth Ministries =====
Dynamic Youth Ministries is an organization that runs two youth groups: Calvinist Cadet Corps and ThereforeGo Ministries.

====== Calvinist Cadet Corps ======
Calvinist Cadet Corps
- Owner: Dynamic Youth Ministries
- Age range: 4-11
- Headquarters: Grand Rapids, Michigan
- Location: United States, Canada
- Founded: 1952
- Membership: 9,900
- Executive Director: Steve Bootsma
- Affiliation: CRCNA
- Website calvinistcadets.org

Calvinist Cadet Corps is an independent non-denominational Christian boys' Scouting organization usually affiliated with the Christian Reformed Church. Currently, the Corps has about 440 US clubs with weekly meetings including a Bible lesson. Members range from first grade to high school. Merit badges are tied into Scripture.

The Calvinist Cadet Corps was officially founded in 1952 in Reformed churches, as the Dutch of the Reformed Christian Churches supported Dutch parallel programs, compared to the Dutch of the Reformed Churches who generally joined the general organization. The Calvinettes and Young Calvinist Federation duplicated the GSUSA and Christian Endeavour respectively.

The Corps is split into five ministries, or levels:

- Kingdom Kids (ages 4–5, and the only coed level)
- Junior Cadets (grades 1–3)
- Recruit-Pathfinder-Builder (grades 4–6)
- Guide Trails (grades 7–9)
- Voyageurs (grades 9-11)

The organization uses uniforms similar to the BSA.

Calvinist Cadet Corps holds Model Car Derbies.

=== Frontier Girls ===
Frontier Girls
- Owner: Frontier Girls, LLC
- Age range: 5-18
- Founded: January 19, 2007
- Founder: Kerry Cordy
- Membership: 1,500 (2013)
- Website frontiergirlsclubs.com

Frontier Girls is an independent Scouting style program for girls, open to girls and volunteers of all faiths.

====== Frontier Girls history ======
Frontier Girls was founded in 2007 by Kerry Cordy as she felt that GSUSA had moved away from skills and badges.

Frontier Girls Promise

I pledge to love God, Be loyal to my country, and to love my neighbor as myself.

— About.com

====== Frontier Girls program ======
Belief in God (any higher power) and living by the Frontier promise are membership requirements. Frontier Girls wear red, white and blue uniforms. The red vest is available through the program, but the white shirts and blue slacks and skirts are not.

Girls can work on over a thousand badges in nine Areas of Discovery: Art, Home, Technology, Character, the World, Health & Fitness, Outdoors, Agriculture and Knowledge. Frontier Girls has a set of Character badges with the requirement of earning one such badge a year. There are four badges (Emergency Preparedness, Etiquette, and either the Patriotism or Our Flag Badge) that all troops must earn once every three years; thus a girl would earn these badges at each level.

The girls can earn the same award, some with variant names, at the different age levels:

- Servant's Heart Award, community service hours
- Life Skills Achievement Award, show proficiency at several life skills
- Make a Difference Award, community service project leadership
- Reaching for the Stars Award, available at the Butterfly and Eagle levels, majoring in an Area of Discovery
- Gem Awards, the highest award at each level

level name	grades	Servant's Heart Award	Make a Difference Award	Gem Award
Otter	K-2 (min. age 5)	5 hours, Red Heart	3–5 hours	Topaz
Dolphin	3-5	10, Silver Heart	10–15 hours	Sapphire
Butterfly	6-8	15, Gold Heart	20–25 hours	Emerald
Eagle	Grades 9-12	20, Gold Diamond Heart	40–50 hours	Diamond
Owl	Adult	100, Gold Ruby Heart	50 hours	Grey Diamond

A troop may consist of all age levels as the meeting time is split between age level activities and joint activities. Quest Club is a coed affiliate of Frontier Girls.

===== Pathfinders =====
Pathfinders
- Owner: Seventh-day Adventist Church
- Age range: 10-15
- Country: World
- Membership: 2,000,000 (2001)
- director of youth ministries: Gilbert Cangy
- Website www.clubministries.org/pathfinders/

Pathfinder Motto

The love of Christ constrains us all.

— BSA Troop 97

Pathfinders is a Christian Scout-like organization run by the Seventh-day Adventist Church for boys (40%) and girls (60%) in grades 5-10. Currently, there are 2,000 clubs in North America, with membership open to non-Seventh-day Adventists. Considered a church ministry, the clubs focus on camping and community services with earnable honors and patches.

====== Pathfinders History ======
- Missionary Volunteer Society
Pathfinder Pledge

By the grace of God, I will be pure, and kind, and true. I will keep the Pathfinder Law. I will be a servant of God and a friend to man.

— Pathfinders Online

In 1907, the forerunner Missionary Volunteer Society was founded. Seventh-day Adventist boys could not join the Boy Scouts when they started in 1910, due to events happening on the Sabbath, among other reasons. Local Seventh-day Adventist church leaders began, in 1911, various similar groups under names like Pals, Woodland Clans and Takoma Clan.

Pathfinder Law

The Law is for me to: Keep the morning watch Do my honest part Care for my body, Keep a level eye Be courteous and obedient Walk softly in the sanctuary, Keep a song in my heart, Go on God's errand.

— Pathfinders Online

In 1919, the Mission Scouts of Madison, Tennessee were started by Arthur W. Spalding, who wrote a pledge and law for the group. The Missionary Volunteer Department of the General Conference began a class style award earning program in the 1920s. The Department's associate secretary received permission from the BSA to incorporate into a MV honors program parts from Merit Badges in 1928. In 1926, the denomination held its first summer camp in Michigan. In Santa Ana, California around 1929 to 1930, local Adventist clubs using the name Pathfinder were started by John McKim and Dr. Theron Johnston. A JMV summer camp was found in 1930 by the Southeastern California Conference was called Pathfinder Camp mostly likely due to the existence of the Santa Ana Pathfinder. The Santa Ana Pathfinders ended in 1936. A year later in Glendale, California, a new Pathfinder group was founded which also added military drills from the Adventist affiliated Medical Cadet Corps. There was a general opposition to these clubs by the denomination's leaders as they did not want the focus to be on missionary work as opposed to more secular pursuits. Despite this, Pathfinder Clubs were sprouting up all over California and the Pacific Northwest in the 1940s. The Southeastern California Conference youth director John Hancock started the first conference sponsored Pathfinder Club in Riverside in 1946.

- Pathfinder

With the action of the Southeastern California Conference, discussion regarding these clubs moved to the denomination's General Conference (GC), which in the 1950s recognized the program. The GC then adopted a program and guidelines while adopting a pledge and law similar to the Mission Scouts' version. The next year, the Oregon Conference held the first Pathfinder Fair and the GC issued the Pathfinder Staff Training Course publication.

====== Pathfinders program ======
The organization uses uniforms similar to Scouting. The members follow a Law and Pledge, go on campouts, and earn honor patches.

===== Pioneer Clubs =====
Pioneer Clubs
- Owner: Pioneer Ministries
- Founded: 1939
- Founders: Joe Coughlin; Betty Whitaker; Harriet Brehm (honorary)
- Website pioneerclubs.org

Pioneer Clubs, formerly Girls' Guild and Pioneer Girls, is a Christian Scout-like organization run by the Pioneer Ministries. The Ministries consist of four divisions: Pioneer Girls, Pioneer Boys, Pioneer Clubs, and Clubes Pioneros.

====== PC history ======
Girls' Guild was founded in 1939 as an affiliated girls' group of the Christian Service Brigade by Joe Coughlin and Betty Whitaker, 1st program director, on the request of Harriet Brehm, a sister of a Brigade member. In 1940, the Guild held its first summer camp at Fish Lake, Volo, Illinois. A new director took over in 1940, Viola Waterhouse, and another in 1941, Carol Erickson.

Pioneer Girls slogan

Christ in every phase of a girl's life.

— Billy Graham Center

The Girls' Guild in 1941 was revamped and renamed by Erickson to the Pioneer Girls (PG). In 1943, Erickson approached Herbert J. Taylor who through his Christian Workers' Foundation funded the PG, gave advice, free administrative support and gave them office space in Chicago's Civic Opera Building. Taylor also had the organization form its first board of directors and had them incorporate by the end of 1943. The PG also started buying camps, all called Camp Cherith. From 1939 to 1950, the main source of church club sponsors were Baptist, although there was a range of different denomination also sponsoring. In 1953, PG's headquarters was moved. In 1959, a mystery book series featuring two Pioneer Girls, called the Pioneer Girls Adventure Series, releasing at least three books.

Year	clubs	Members
1943	64	800
1945	226	3,000
1959	2060	48,000
1976	1765	59,396
1976; Canada	671	30,281
2005	8419	121,586

With the camping program and camp expansion in 1971, the camps were placed in a separate corporation, and then a licensing agreement tied them back to Pioneer Girls.

In 1979, boys were allowed membership and had their own Pioneer Boys clubs in 1981. The Pioneer Girls in 1981 was renamed Pioneer Ministries, but known as Pioneer Clubs. In 1945, clubs were started in Canada. By 1976, the organization owned 19 camps in the US and 6 in Canada. Also, while dropping the pioneer theme, sister organizations were set up in 16 other countries including France, Italy, Korea, and Pakistan, with more in Latin America, the Caribbean and Africa. In Thailand, where its branch was founded by Pioneer alumni and missionary Joan Killilea, the branch was called the Friendship Club.

====== Pioneer Clubs programs ======
Clubs can be operated under three formats based on the number and ages of the kids: Pioneer (for churches with 3-12 children per age group), Discovery (for a total of 3-12 kids from K-6) and Exploring (many kids, grades 1–6). Pioneer program is split into five age levels:

- Skipper – ages 2 & 3
- Scooter – ages 4 & 5
- Voyager – grades 1 – 2
- Pathfinder – grades 3 – 4
- Trailblazer – grades 5 – 7

Pioneer Clubs hold wood car races called Pine Car Derby.

====== External links ======
- Pioneer Girls at Vintagekidstuff.com

===== Royal Rangers =====
Royal Rangers
- Owner: Assemblies of God
- Headquarters: Springfield, Mo.
- Country: US; 62 others
- Founded: 1962
- Membership: 125,000
- international Director: Doug Marsh
- Website royalrangers.com

Royal Ranger Motto

Ready

— BSA Troop 97

Royal Rangers is a Christian boys' Scout-like organization run by the Assemblies of God. The Rangers have 4,000 US groups with members in kindergarten through 12th grade, with a goal to provide "Christlike character formation". About 90 Boy Scout troops are sponsored by Assemblies of God churches. Many Pentecostal churches also use the Royal Rangers program. Some units in German use the name "Christian Royal Ranger Scouting".

====== History ======
Royal Rangers was established by the Assemblies of God in 1962. In 2012, Camporama had a high-ropes course, two zip lines, a water slide, and a lumberjack show.

====== Program ======
The organization uses uniforms similar to Scouting and parallel terms:

- outpost (troop)
- Ranger Code (Scout Law)
- Ranger Pledge (Scout Promise)
- Commander (Scoutmaster)
- merits (merit badges)
- Gold Medal of Achievement (Eagle Scout)
Royal Ranger Code

A Royal Ranger is: alert, clean, honest, courageous, loyal, courteous, obedient, spiritual.

— Doorway to Adventure

Their four program levels are divided by school grade:

- Ranger Kids (K-2nd grade)
- Discovery Rangers (3-5)
- Adventure Rangers (6-8)
- Expedition Rangers (9-12)

A Camporama is scheduled in the summer every four years at the organization's Eagle Rock, Missouri campground. The Rangers hold small car races called Pinewood Derby.

==== Salvation Army ====
===== Adventure Corps =====
Adventure Corps
- Owner: Salvation Army
- Age range: 4-14
- Founded: January 1983
Previous; Moonbeams	
- Website; Eastern USA official website

Motto

Adventure with Christ!

— Booth Youth
Pledge

I promise to explore God's word and God's world to find ways to serve him and help others, to develop and guard good habits so that I will grow as God desires, and to adventure into the world with the "good news" of Jesus Christ.

— Booth Youth

Adventure Corps, or The Salvation Army Boys' Adventure Corps, is a Christian Scout-like organization run by the Salvation Army. Currently, the organization has about 1,300 units of grades 1-8 boys. The boys do not have to be members of a Salvation Army congregation. In addition to the Adventure Corps, the Salvation Army has sponsored 130 Boy Scout troops. From 1913, the Salvation Army ran the Life Saving Scouts/Life Saving Guards-Boys teen age program to 1929 when it merged with the BSA.

====== History ======
The Adventure Corps was established in January 1983.

====== Program ======
The program core is based on Christian fellowship, teamwork and leadership. The Corps is split into two levels: Explorers (grades 1 to 4), and Rangers (5 to 8).

===== Other groups =====
- Moonbeams @ The Salvation Army Eastern Territory Youth Department - girls and boys in pre-k and kindergarten
- Sunbeams @ The Salvation Army Eastern Territory Youth Department
- Girl Guards - grades 6 - 12
  - Alaska official website
  - The Salvation Army Eastern Territory Youth Department

==== Southern Baptist Convention ====
At the Southern Baptist Convention's meeting on June 11–12, 2013, the convention recommended that Southern Baptist Churches disaffiliate from the BSA and join alternative organizations, particularly those run by the Southern Baptist Convention.

===== Challengers =====
Challengers
- Owner: Woman's Missionary Union (Southern Baptist Convention)
- Age range: 12-17
Previous; Royal Ambassadors	
- Website official site

The Challengers is a Christian teenage boys' Scout-like organization run by the Woman's Missionary Union of the Southern Baptist Convention.

The Challengers program is to equip boys in "mission education."

===== Royal Ambassadors =====
Royal Ambassadors
- Owner: Woman's Missionary Union & North American Mission Board (Southern Baptist Convention)
- Age range: 5-11
- Location: US
- Founded: 1908
- Founder: Woman's Missionary Union
- Membership: 31,000
	Next; Challengers
- Website official site

RA Pledge

As a Royal Ambassador I will do my best: to become a well-informed, responsible follower of Christ; to have a Christ-like concern for all people; to learn how to carry the message of Christ around the world; to work with others in sharing Christ; and to keep myself clean and healthy in mind and body.

— BSA Troop 97

Royal Ambassadors (RA) is a Christian boys' Scout-like organization run by the Woman's Missionary Union of the Southern Baptist Convention. About 3,000 SBC churches sponsor groups. There are some Southern Baptist churches sponsoring Boy Scout troops. The name of the program was selected from the New Testament, where Christians are told by the Apostle Paul to be "ambassadors for Christ."

====== RA history ======
Year	chapters	members
1915	500+	4,500
1960	13,000	220,000
2013	3,000+	31,000

The Royal Ambassadors was founded in 1908 for elementary school aged boys after the WMU Annual Meeting in Hot Springs, Arkansas.

As the RA continued to grow, a convention-wide full-time RA secretary was needed in 1943. The Brotherhood Commission took over the program in 1954. In 1997 that Memphis-based SBC agency was discontinued through a merger forming the North American Mission Board. With a shift in strategy, the board turned over regular operation of RA's in 2011.

The programs' age groups are Lads (grades 1–3), and Crusaders (4-6). The RA wooden mini-car race is called RA Racers. There is no uniform but they generally wear a T-shirt and own a vest to display their earned badges. Members can earn six "campcraft" patches: Discover 1/2/3, Hiker, Camper, Woodsman. The program is for missionary training and development. Thus, merit patches are earned for mission work and Bible verse memorization.

===== RA Camps =====
Early on in RA history, a need for Royal Ambassador summer camps arose in states with large RA participation. Many states (particularly southern states) created such camps. Many of these camps thrived for decades. However, as RAs declined many of these camps (owned by their respective state run Baptist Conventions) were either closed, converted to a multi-purpose facility, or completely transformed to a different style of facility such as a retreat and conference center. Camp McCall in Sunset, South Carolina (although it has also separated its affiliation with RAs) is the sole remaining former RA camp that still functions as a male only, missions focused, Christian summer camp for boys with a full summer term. Following is a table of known RA camps:

State	RA Camp	Founded	Current Status
Alabama	Shocco Springs (Adventure Camp)	1948 (1965)	The Alabama RA camp was built on a portion of Shocco Springs property that was called Adventure Camp. Adventure camp as an RA camp slowly dissolved in the 2010s. Shocco Springs is now strictly a Christian retreat and conference center, but it does host one "Adventure Weekend" annually for men and boys 1st-6th grade in place of the former Adventure Camp.
Georgia	Camp Pinnacle	1947	Camp Pinnacle still exists as a girls summer camp and year-round retreat center. It has rebranded as Pinnacle Retreat Center.
Georgia	Camp Kaleo	1988	An RA program is still ongoing at Camp Kaleo, however Kaleo now hosts a girls program alongside the boys program. Camp Kaleo has also rebranded itself as Camp Kaleo Retreat Center. The Georgia Baptist Convention voted to close Camp Kaleo in 2024, however the nonprofit organization "Friends of Kaleo" has a three year agreement to run the camp and work to sustain it for now.
New Mexico	Sivells Camp	1963	Founded as the Baptist state RA camp, later transitioned to a coed Baptist camp in the 1990s. Today it is officially "Sivells Baptist Camp and Retreat Center."
North Carolina	Camp Truett	1953	Founded as a camp for RAs and Girls in Action (GAs), the state RA Camp later became camp Caraway and Truett carried on as a coed summer camp. Truett remains to this day as a conference center and camp.
North Carolina	Camp Caraway	1963	Camp Caraway maintained its status as an RA camp until around the year 2000 when it separated from RAs. It carried on as a boys camp and today functions as a coed conference center and camp. Caraway still hosts one boys camp each year.
Oklahoma	Camp Hudgens	1960	Camp Hudgens remained the state RA camp until the late 1990s, it then transitioned to a coed Christian children's camp until its closing in 2007.
South Carolina	Camp Rawls	1942	Formed as the RA and GA camp for South Carolina. It hosted RAs until 1958, RAs met at North Greenville Junior College in 1959, and transitioned to Camp McCall in 1960. GAs continued to meet at Camp Rawls until 1982, when Camp Lavida opened as the South Carolina GA camp for the 1983 summer.
South Carolina	Camp McCall	1960	Camp McCall still functions as a Christian summer camp for boys and men during the summers (Late May-Early August). Hosting individual camps for boys 4th-12th grade, father-son camps for boys 1st-4th grade, and multi-generational camps for boys and men of all ages. Camp McCall also hosts retreat groups during the fall, winter, and spring.
Tennessee	Camp Carson	1949	Camp Carson was commonly used by RAs, but was never specifically a dedicated RA camp. Tennessee never had an official state RA camp.
Tennessee	Camp Linden	1950	Camp Linden was commonly used by RAs, but was never specifically a dedicated RA camp. Tennessee never had an official state RA camp.
Virginia	Camp Piankatank	1961	Camp Piankatank functioned as the state RA camp until 2000. In 2001 it transitioned to a coed summer camp. It is now officially called "Piankatank Summer Camp and Retreat Center."

=== Jewish organizations ===
- BBYO || Religious pluralism || Zionism
- NFTY: The Reform Jewish Youth Movement || Reform Judaism || Reform Zionism || Union for Reform Judaism
- NCSY || Orthodox Judaism || || Orthodox Union
- United Synagogue Youth || Conservative Judaism || Zionism || United Synagogue of Conservative Judaism
- Young Judaea || Religious pluralism || Zionism

=== Other religious organizations ===
==== Navigators USA ====
Navigators USA
- Age range: 7-18
- Headquarters: New York City
- Country: US
- Founder: Robin Bossert
- Membership: 600
- executive director: Robin Bossert
- Website navigatorsusa.org

Navigator Motto

Stay On Course

— BSA Troop 97
Navigator Slogan

The more you give, The more you get

— BSA Troop 97
Navigator Traits (law)

Truthful, Respectful, Inclusive, Generous, Dependable, Resourceful, Cooperative

— BSA Troop 97
Moral Compass (promise)

As a Navigator I promise to do my best To create a world free of prejudice and ignorance. To treat people of every race, creed, Lifestyle and ability with dignity and respect. To strengthen my body and improve My mind to reach my full potential. To protect our planet and Preserve our freedom.

— Navigators USA Guidebook

Navigators USA is a secular co-ed Scout-like organization. In 2013, there were 45 chapters. The program had no uniform as of July 2013. A congress was held in the fall of 2013 where the issue of uniform was on the agenda.

The organization stresses outdoor activities and community service projects.

===== Navigators U.S.A. History =====
The Unitarian Church of All Souls sponsored a Boy Scout troop in New York City's East Harlem neighborhood. After disagreements over the Boy Scouts' exclusionary membership policies in 2003, the troop broke away to become a coed inclusive organization. All Souls has been underwriting the organization's operation for $10,000 to $20,000 a year since 2003. In fall 2010, Navigators issued its first handbook for the senior section, thus opening up the organization to the public. By March 2011, the group had seven chapters with four in New York City, three of which are through a partnership with a local service group, and one each in Binghamton, New York; Durham, North Carolina; and Belmont, Massachusetts. In 2012, the first and lone Illinois chapter was formed in Palatine via Countryside Church Unitarian Universalist. By June 2013, 29 new chapters had been formed in the previous year.

Year	chapters
2003	1
2011	7
2012	16
2013	50

===== NU program =====
The organization has two program sections: Junior Navigators, age 7–10, and Senior Navigators age 11–18. Juniors have three levels:

- Mira
- Vega
- Polaris

The Senior section has four levels:

- Shadow
- Tracker
- Pilot
- Navigator

The program's top award is the Summit Achievement Award.

==== SpiralScouts International ====
SpiralScouts International
- Owner: Aquarian Tabernacle Church
- Age range: 3-18
- Headquarters: Index, Washington
- Country: US
- Founded: 2001
- Membership: 350
- Website spiralscouts.org

SpiralScout Oath

A SpiralScout shall: Respect all living things; be kind and courteous; be honorable; be mindful of his/her words; seek out knowledge in all forms; recognize the beauty in all of creation; offer assistance to others; value honesty and truth; honor personal commitments; and respect the Divine in all things.

— About.com (Note: Coghlan, Heidi. SpiralScouts International About.com: Parenting: Kids' Clubs. Accessed on February 6, 2014.)

SpiralScouts International (SSI) is an independent, secular, inclusive, coed, Scout-like organization built on pagan beliefs and practices. SSI has 45 units called circles and hearths, or families.

The PathFinder Pledge

I pledge myself to the FireFly Promise, the SpiralScouts's Oath, the fulfillment of all my commitments, made to myself as well as others. I pledge to serve all my brothers and sisters in every way on our many journeys around the sun together as I find my way through the world.

— About.com

===== SSI history =====
The Aquarian Tabernacle Church, a Wiccan community in Index, Washington, sponsored a pagan Scout group in 1999. The church looked for a non-belief based program but found none. It was renamed SpiralScouts International in 2001 to expand nationwide, at which time they dropped their Wiccan identification. The BSA sent a cease and decide letter to SpiralScouts, to which they responded with no future contact with the BSA. Since the Boy Scouts' membership policies are disapproved of by SSI, SSI offered their highest award to any Eagle Scout returning their Eagle Badge in protest.

The FireFly Promise

I promise to serve the Wise Ones, To Honor and respect Mother Earth, To be helpful and understanding toward all people, And always keep love in my heart.

— About.com

===== Program =====
The group can be a Hearth that consists of one family or as a "circle" with community membership. Members are placed into local groups called Circles, which may consist of age group Hearths. The age level groups of the Hearths are FireFlies (ages 3–8), SpiralScouts (8–14), and PathFinders (14–18). The program's pagan twist is that its badges have a culture's myth relationship component and its dress uniform of a capuche and a braided, beaded macramé necklace. The activity uniform consists of a forest green polo shirt with khaki bottoms (pants, short, skirt or skort) and the SpiralScouts neck cord.

== Youth wings of political parties ==
- Armenian Youth Federation – founded in 1933, youth wing of the socialist Armenian Revolutionary Federation
- National Socialist Liberation Front – a neo-Nazi youth group that existed from 1969 until sometime in the 1980s
- Revolutionary Communist Youth Brigade – succeeded by the Revolutionary Student Brigade; both existed during the 1980s
- Socialist Youth League (United States) – existed from 1946 to 1954 and eventually merged with the Young People's Socialist League (1907)
- Teen Age Republicans
- W.E.B. Du Bois Clubs of America
- Young Communist League USA
- Young Democratic Socialists
- Young Democrats of America
- Young People's Socialist League
- Young People's Socialist League (1907)
- Young Pioneers of America
- Young Republicans
- Young Socialist Alliance

== Other ==
- 4-H
- AFS Intercultural Programs - international youth exchange program, founded in 1915
- Boy Spies of America - existed during World War I to seek out spies
- Boys & Girls Clubs of America
- Campus Kitchen - founded in 2001, works to have extra food from campus kitchens donated to people in need
- Children's Express - existed 1975–2001, news agency run by children ages 8 to 18
- Civil Air Patrol
- The Choice Program
- Family, Career and Community Leaders of America
- The First Tee - a golfing associated program founded in 1997
- Freedom's Answer - founded in 2002(?), supports voter registration and turnout
- Future Business Leaders of America - a high school club founded in 1940 to build future business leaders
- Gay-Straight Alliance
- Girls For A Change - girls implementing social change projects, founded in 2002
- Girls, Inc. - roots back to 1865 but has been national since 1945
- Ignition - student to student high school mentoring program
- Junior Birdmen - existed during the 1930s for boys interested in model airplanes
- Junior G-Men - existed during the late 1930s and early 1940s for boys
- Junior State of America - a high school club founded in 1934 to develop political leadership skills; claims about 10,000 members
- Key Club International - a high school club founded in 1925 to building community service skills, sponsored by Kiwanis International
- Link Crew - student to student mentoring program
- Mexican American Youth Organization - civil rights organization founded in 1967
- Moriya - learning program for young Jewish girls
- National Beta Club
- National FFA Organization - at one time Future Farmers of America, but name changed in 1988; founded in 1928; membership of 610,245 in 2014
- National High School Rodeo Association - incorporated in 1961 but roots back to 1947
- National Honor Society
- National Junior Horticultural Association - founded in 1934
- National Postsecondary Agricultural Student Organization - founded in 1980
- National Student Association - an association of university student governments founded in 1947 and merged with the National Student Lobby in 1978 to form the United Statues Student Association
- National Student Federation of America - an association of university student governments that existed from 1925 until the Second World War; succeeded by the National Student Association
- National Junior Firefighter Program
- National Youth Administration - a New Deal agency dealing with youth aged 16–25 from 1935 until 1943
- New Farmers of America - African-American version of Future Farmers of America; founded in 1935; merged with Future Farmers of America in 1965
- OneMillionOfUs - youth civic education & impact organization, founded in March 2019.
- Rainbow Girls - young girl service organization sponsored by Freemasons
- Running Start: Bringing Young Women to Politics
- SUSTA The Federation of Ukrainian Student Organizations of America - founded in 1953
- Safe Schools/Healthy Students
- Sons of the American Legion - organization of male descendants of U.S. war veterans (from World War I to the present day) founded in 1932
- Southern Negro Youth Congress - existed from 1937 until 1949
- Students Today Leaders Forever - founded in 2003
- Taiwanese American Foundation
- Teens in Prevention
- United States Naval Sea Cadet Corps
- United States Student Association - association of university student governments founded in 1978 with the merger of the National Student Association and the National Student Lobby
- United States Youth Council - existed from 1945 until 1986
- United States Youth Government - youth advocacy group with members elected by the public in a structure based on the Constitution of the United States
- Urban debate league
- YMCA Youth and Government
- Young Judaea - Zionist youth organization
- Youth Activism Project - founded in 1992

== Age groups ==
-	5	6	7	8	9	10	11	12	13	14	15	16	17	18	19	20	21	22	+
Adventure Corps
	Explorers (grades 1-4)				Rangers (5 to 8)														
AWANA
Cubbies; Puggles (toddlers)	Sparks (K-2nd grade)					Truth & Training			Junior Varsity			Varsity or "24-7"							
Baden-Powell Service Association (Note: 187. United States. Page 6. "All Scouting Associations in Every Country (continued)". International Scouting. Troop 97 BSA.)
	Otters (ages 5 to 7)			Timberwolves (8 to 10)			Pathfinders (11 to 17)							Rovers (18+)					
Calvinist Cadet Corps
Kingdom Kids (only coed level)		Junior Cadets (grades 1-3)			Recruit-Pathfinder-Builder (grades 4-6)			Guide Trails (grades 7-9)			Voyageurs (grades 9-11)								
Caravan
	Searchers (grades 1-2)			Explorers (3-4)		Adventurers (5-6)													
Christian Service Brigade
Tadpoles (ages 4-5)		Tree Climbers (ages 6-7)		Stockade (ages 8-11)				Battalion (ages 12-18)											
Frontier Girls
Penguin age 3-5 (min age 3)		Otter; Grades K-2 (min. age 5)			Dolphin; Grades 3-5			Butterfly; Grades 6-8			Eagle; Grades 9-12								
GEMS Girls' Clubs
Kingdom Kids (only coed level)		Awareness (grades 1-3)			Discovery (grades 4-6)			Advanced (grades 7-8)			Counselor-in-Training (CIT) (grades 9-11)								
Navigators USA
			Junior Navigators (age 7-10)				Senior Navigators (age 11-18)												
Pioneer Clubs
Skipper (ages 2-3)	Scooter (ages 4-5)	Voyager (grades 1–2)		Pathfinder (grades 3–4)		Trailblazer (grades 5–7)													
Discovery (grades K-6)																			
	Exploring (grades 1-6)																		
Royal Rangers
Ranger Kids (K-2nd grade)					Discovery Rangers (3-5)			Adventure Rangers (6-8)			Expedition Rangers (9-12)								
SpiralScouts International
FireFlies (ages 3-8)					SpiralScouts (9-13)					PathFinders (13-18)									
Southern Baptist Convention
								Challengers											
Royal Ambassadors
	Lads (grades 1-3)				Crusaders (4-6)														
Moriya
	Moriya modified (ages 5-6)		Moriya (7 to adult)																

== Other groups' external links ==
- Keepers of the Faith is an independent, decentralized purchasable Christian Scout-like program that originated in the United States with separate programs for boys (Contenders for the Faith), and girls (formerly Keepers at Home), though they can be coordinated, and there can be overlap in the skills learned and activities.
- Young Vikings Club is a Norse heathen Scout-like organization for youth from 6–18 years old.
- Moriya is a learning program for Jewish young girls.
- The United States Youth Government is a youth advocacy organization representing U.S. citizens and residents aged 0–29, with a structure based on the Constitution of the United States. Its members, who must be younger than 29, are elected by the public aged 0–29 to represent individual U.S. states and territories in the organization's legislature, the Youth Assembly. The public also elects a Youth President and Vice-President, who lead the organization and appoint Justices to the Supreme Youth Court.
