= List of non-aligned Scouting organizations =

Non-aligned Scouting and Scout-like organisations have been created over the years, separate and often distinct from the mainstream Scout Movement served by the World Association of Girl Guides and Girl Scouts (WAGGGS) and the World Organization of the Scout Movement (WOSM).

== International Scouting organizations (excluding WAGGGS and WOSM) ==
- Confédération Européenne de Scoutisme
- International Scout and Guide Fellowship
- Order of World Scouts
- Skolta Esperanto Ligo
- Union Internationale des Guides et Scouts d'Europe
- World Federation of Independent Scouts
- World Organization of Independent Scouts

== Scouting organizations ==
- Afghanistan Scout Association
- American Heritage Girls
- Associação dos Escuteiros de São Tomé e Príncipe
- Association des Scouts de Djibouti
- Association des Scouts et Guides de Riaumont
- Baden-Powell Scouts' Association
- Belarusian Scout Association
- Canadian Traditional Scouting Association
- Conférence Française de Scoutisme
- Corpo Nacional de Escutas da Guiné-Bissau
- Eclaireurs Neutres de France
- Fédération du scoutisme centrafricain
- Hashomer Hatzair
- Homenetmen
- Iran Scout Organization
- Katholische Pfadfinderschaft Europas
- Kyrgyz Respublikasynyn Skaut Kengesh
- Kyrgyzstan Skaut-Kyzdar Assotsiatsiyasy
- National Organization of Russian Scouts
- National Scout Association of Eritrea
- Organization of Russian Young Pathfinders
- Pathfinder Scouts Association
- Sahraoui Scout Association
- Scout Club of Hainan
- Scouts du Mali
- União Dos Escoteiros Portugueses
- Vietnamese Scout Association-Hội Huớng Đạo
- Związek Harcerstwa Rzeczypospolitej
- The Scouts/Guides Organisation in India

=== Inactive ===
- American Boy Scouts
- Bleimor (Scouting)
- Sturmtrupp-Pfadfinder

== Notable Scout-like organizations ==
=== Active ===
- Awana US evangelical Scout-like organization
- Boys' Brigade (The predecessor to the Scout Movement, created in the UK in 1883, 25 years before Baden-Powell's Scouts)
- Camp Fire (nationwide US youth organisation)
- Christian Service Brigade (non-denominational Christian youth organisation for boys in the USA and Canada)
- Fianna Éireann (name used by various Irish republican youth organisations in the past)
- Habonim Dror (Jewish youth organization, active in several countries)
- Hanoar Hatzioni (Jewish youth organisation, active in several countries)
- Hashomer Hatzair (Jewish youth organization, active in several countries)
- Movimiento Exploradoril Salesiano (Argentina-Paraguay)
- National Association of Russian Explorers (Russian émigré youth organisation in the USA)
- National Catholic Committee for Trail Life USA (Trail Life USA in Roman Catholic parishes)
- Navigators USA (Formed in 2003 in USA, open to all children and communities now also in Uganda and United Kingdom)
- Pathfinders (Seventh-day Adventist youth organisation in several countries) *
- Pioneer movement (Communist youth organisation in several countries)
- Royal Rangers (Pentecostal youth organisation in several countries = Exploradores del Rey) *
- SpiralScouts International (neo-pagan youth organisation in the USA)
- Trail Life USA (Evangelical Christian youth organization)
- Wandervogel (old German youth movement that re-emerged after World War II after having been banned in 1935 by the Nazis)
- The Woodcraft Folk (Modern version of British Kibbo Kift)

* considered Scouting in most European countries

=== Inactive ===
- Kibbo Kift (British anti-war and anti-capitalistic youth organisation between 1920 and 1951)
- TUXIS (Canadian Protestant youth organisation between the 1920s and the 1970s)
- Hitler-Jugend (German Nazi youth organisation that existed from 1922 to 1945)
- Vladimir Lenin All-Union Pioneer Organization (the largest youth organisation in the Soviet Union between 1922 and 1991)

== See also ==
- Traditional Scouting
- List of World Organization of the Scout Movement members
- List of World Association of Girl Guides and Girl Scouts members
