= Girl Scouts (disambiguation) =

Girl Scouts are female members of scout organizations. In some organization, they are called Girl Guides.

Girl Scouts may also refer to:

- Girl Scouts of the USA, the United States organization founded by Juliette Gordon Low

There are thousands of national Scout and Guid organizations or federations; these are grouped into six international Scouting or Guiding associations with some non-aligned organizations:

- Confédération Européenne de Scoutisme
- Order of World Scouts
- International Union of Guides and Scouts of Europe
- World Federation of Independent Scouts
- World Association of Girl Guides and Girl Scouts
  - List of World Association of Girl Guides and Girl Scouts members
- World Organization of the Scout Movement
  - List of World Organization of the Scout Movement members
- List of non-aligned Scouting organizations

== Other uses ==
- Girl Scout (film), a 2008 South Korean film
- "Girl Scout", a song from the stage musical Beetlejuice
- "Girlscout", a song by Jack Off Jill from the 1997 album Sexless Demons and Scars
