= Wood car racing =

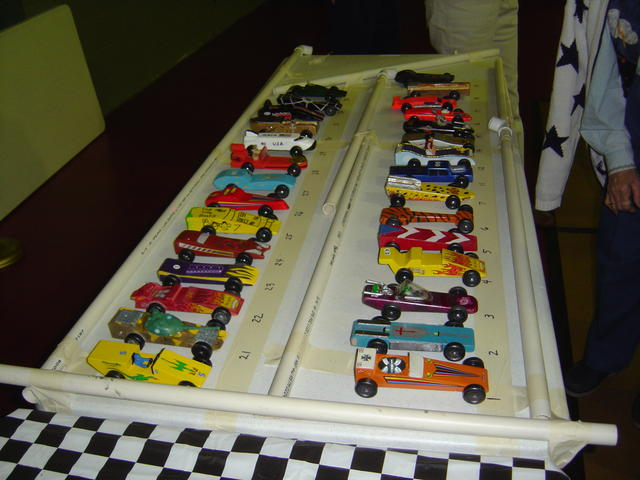
Pinewood derby cars ready to race

Wood car racing is a racing event for youth who build small cars from wood, usually from kits containing a block of pine, plastic wheels and metal axles. Kids from all over the world participate in events related to wood car racing.

== History ==
The pinewood derby was created as an event for Cub Scouts in the Boy Scouts of America. The first pinewood derby was held on May 15, 1953 at the Scout House in Manhattan Beach, California by Cub Scout Pack 280C (the present Pack 713). The concept was created by the Cub Pack’s Cubmaster Don Murphy, and sponsored by the Management Club at North American Aviation.

Murphy's son was too young to participate in the popular Soap Box Derby races, so he came up with the idea of racing miniature wood cars. The cars had the same gravity-powered concept as the full-size Soap Box Derby cars, but were much smaller and easier to build.

The pinewood derby had a sensational first year. The originator of the idea—Don Murphy and the Management Club of North American Aviation—sent out thousands of brochures to anyone who requested more information. The idea spread rapidly, and competitions were held across the country, mainly with recreation departments and nonprofit organizations including the Los Angeles County Department of Recreation. Of all that early enthusiasm, however, only the Boy Scouts of America made it part of an official program.

== Other races ==
As the popularity of the pinewood derby grew, other organizations adopted the concept. Pinewood derby is a registered trademark of the BSA, so most use different names. Each derby has slightly different rules for making and racing their cars.

- Awana has the Awana Grand Prix.
- Calvinist Cadet Corps hold Model Car Derbies
- Christian Service Brigade uses the name Shape N Race Derby.
- Girl Scouts of the USA has the Girl Scout Grand Prix. and Powder Puff Derby. Some GSUSA troops compete against Cub Scout packs.
- Pioneer Clubs and the Lutheran Girl/Boy Pioneers call their races, Pine Car Derby.
- Royal Ambassadors have RA Racers or RA Racer Derby.
- Royal Rangers's event, the Pinewood Derby, use a different kit with an original style narrow wheel, adjustable screw axle and wooden dowel axle housing.
- Scouts Canada has the Kub Kar Rally for Cub Scouts, Beaver Buggies for Beaver Scouts, and Scout Express trucks for Scouts.
- Trail Life USA's similar event is called the Trail Life Grand Prix.
- Valve cover racing is an event at some car shows using vehicles made from valve covers.
- Woodcar Independent Racing League open to anyone of any age
- YMCA Y-Guides' and Y-Princesses' (formerly YMCA Indian Guides) "chule car" (pine car) races use the same kit as the Royal Rangers.
- BSA has recently added an 18-wheeler category to Pinewood Derby, similar to Scout Express trucks from Scouts Canada.
