= The Scout Association (disambiguation) =

The Scout Association is the largest Scouting organisation in the United Kingdom.

The Scout Association may also refer to:

- World Organization of the Scout Movement
  - List of World Organization of the Scout Movement members
- World Association of Girl Guides and Girl Scouts
  - List of World Association of Girl Guides and Girl Scouts members
- International Union of Guides and Scouts of Europe
- World Federation of Independent Scouts
- Order of World Scouts
- Confederation of European Scouts
- List of non-aligned Scouting organizations
