= Non-aligned Scouting and Scout-like organisations =

Scouting organisations unaligned with WOSM or WAGGGS

Non-aligned Scout organization is a term used by the World Organization of the Scout Movement (WOSM), World Association of Girl Guides and Girl Scouts (WAGGGS) and their member national organizations to refer to Scout organizations that are not affiliated with them. See list of non-aligned Scout organizations.

Scout-like organisations are organizations that resemble Scouts in some way. Scout-like organizations have been created both prior to and after the origin of the Scout Movement and are characterized by use of or similarity to part of the Scout Method.

The Scout Movement is a pluralist movement, not a single organization. Since its origins, the Scout Movement has been composed of many Scout organisations. However, WOSM and WAGGGS, to protect their founding organizations, register only one Scout organization per country, and, although some member organization are federations of several organizations, WOSM has never required any of its founding member organizations to form a federation with other scout organizations.

Terminology used in this article:
The terms "aligned", "non-aligned", "Scout-like" and "breakaway" used in this article reflect the usage of WOSM, WAGGGS and their member national organizations. WOSM, WAGGGS and their member national organizations refer to organizations that had a common origin or were once associated with them in some way but are no longer associated with them as breakaway organizations. A breakaway organization may also be a Scout or Scout-like organization.

== Aligned and non-aligned Scout organisations ==
Since its inception in 1907, the Scout Movement has spread from the United Kingdom to 216 countries and territories around the world. There are at least 520 separate national or regional Scout associations in the world and most have felt the need to create international Scout organisations to set standards and to coordinate activities among member associations.

Six international Scout organisations serve 437 of the world's national associations. There is a seventh that is only for adults. The largest two international organisations, WOSM and WAGGGS, have 362 national associations as members, encompassing 38 million Scouts and Guides. Other multinational Scout organisations include the Confédération Européenne de Scoutisme, Union Internationale des Guides et Scouts d'Europe, and World Federation of Independent Scouts.

There are over 80 Scout associations or umbrella federations that are not aligned with any international Scout organisation, including the Eclaireurs Neutres de France. There are also many single groups that are not affiliated with any regional or national association and the majority of these are in Germany, where the Scout Movement is very fragmented. Membership in non-aligned Scout organizations worldwide is roughly 300,000 to 500,000 individuals.

== Scout-like youth organisations ==
The Scout Movement was well established for both boys and girls internationally by 1910. Subsequently, some Scout organizations began other Scout-like organizations for younger children, such as Wolf Cubs. Robert Baden-Powell insisted that his Wolf Cubs were not junior Scouts and must have an identity and program distinct from Scouts.

Some Scout organizations changed away from traditional Scout programs, schemes, ideals and identity and, while retaining “Scout” in their name, they are now Scout-like organizations.

There are also Scout-like organisations linked to faiths and churches, such as the Salvation Army's Adventure Corps, Pioneers and SAGALA Guards and Legion, Adventism's Pathfinders, the Nazarene Caravan, the Pentecostal Royal Rangers and Awana. Trail Life USA and American Heritage Girls are parallels of the Boy Scouts and Girl Scouts which have a Christian emphasis and are found in Roman Catholic, Anglican, Eastern Orthodox, and other trinitarian Protestant denominations and churches. SpiralScouts International is neo-pagan organisation. Some of these organisations refer to their programs as Scouts.

Other Scout-like organisations are faith-wide like the Camp Fire. TUXIS and Trail Rangers movements were Scout-like organisations which originated about the same time as Scouts; however, these organisations were unable to recover from the disruption of World War II and post-war competition with the Scout movement. A uniquely Canadian Scout-like organization existing since the 1920s is the Junior Forest Wardens which uses forest rangers and forest fire lookouts as role models rather than frontier and military scouts. The Junior Forest Wardens has more direct ties to ecological conservation, and is popular in British Columbia and Alberta. South Africa's Voortrekkers are an Afrikaner youth movement founded in 1931 as some Afrikaners found it difficult to join The Boy Scouts Association's South African branch, an organization founded and led by their Boer War opponent, Baden-Powell. In 2003 Navigators USA was formed to enable people to take part in Scout-like activities which was open to all children and communities. There are over 64 chapters in the US, with new ones being started up in Uganda and in the United Kingdom.

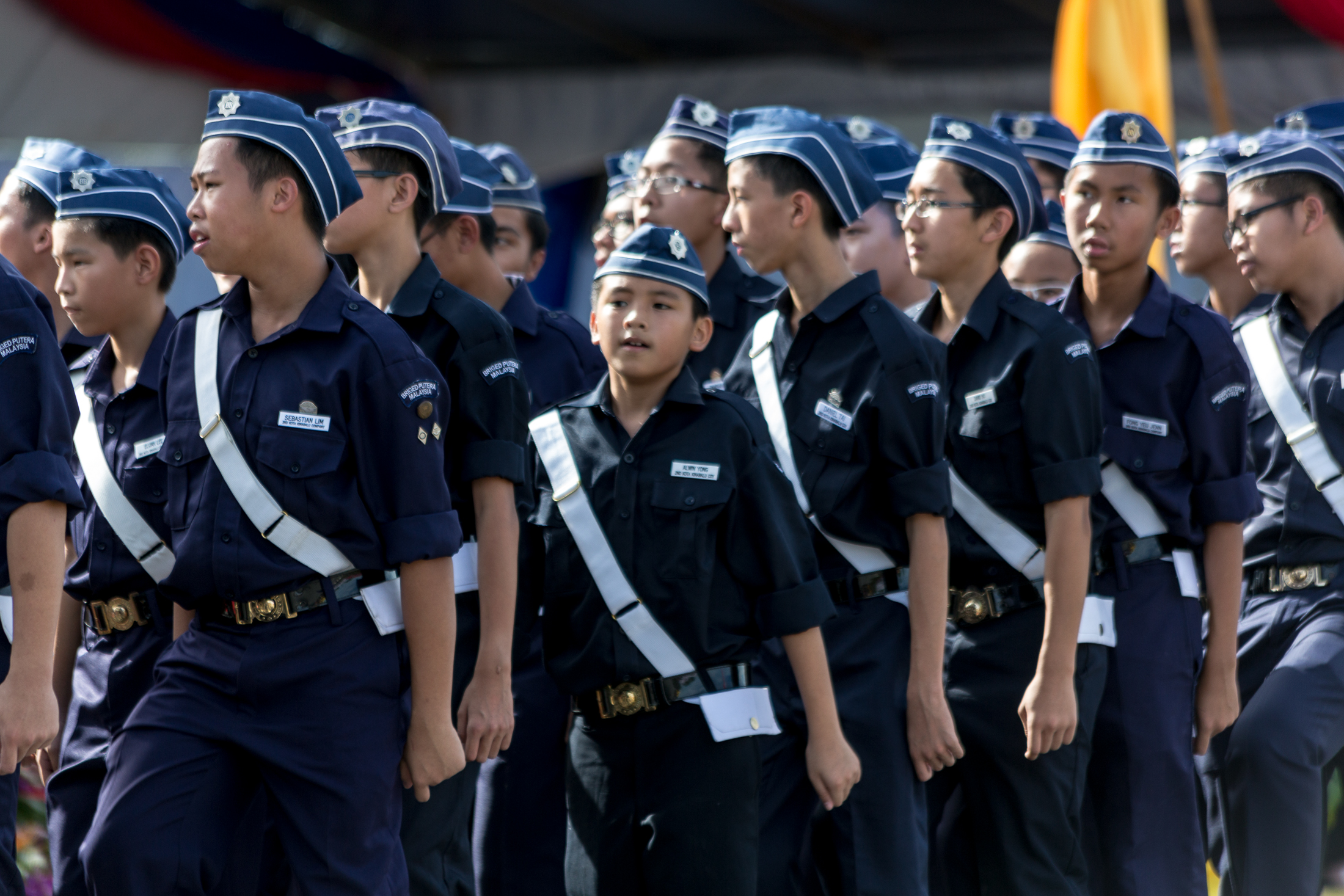
Parade of Boys' Brigade during Celebrations of Hari Merdeka 2013 in Likas, Malaysia

The Brigade Movement including Boys' Brigade, Girls' Brigade and Church Lads and Church Girls Brigade, Jewish Lads' and Girls' Brigade pre-date and have few similarities with Scouts but some Brigades operated early Scout programs. Other groups such as YMCA, YWCA, Sokol, Rotaract and the National FFA Organization and 4-H have few similarities to Scouts.

=== Political and military Scout substitutes ===
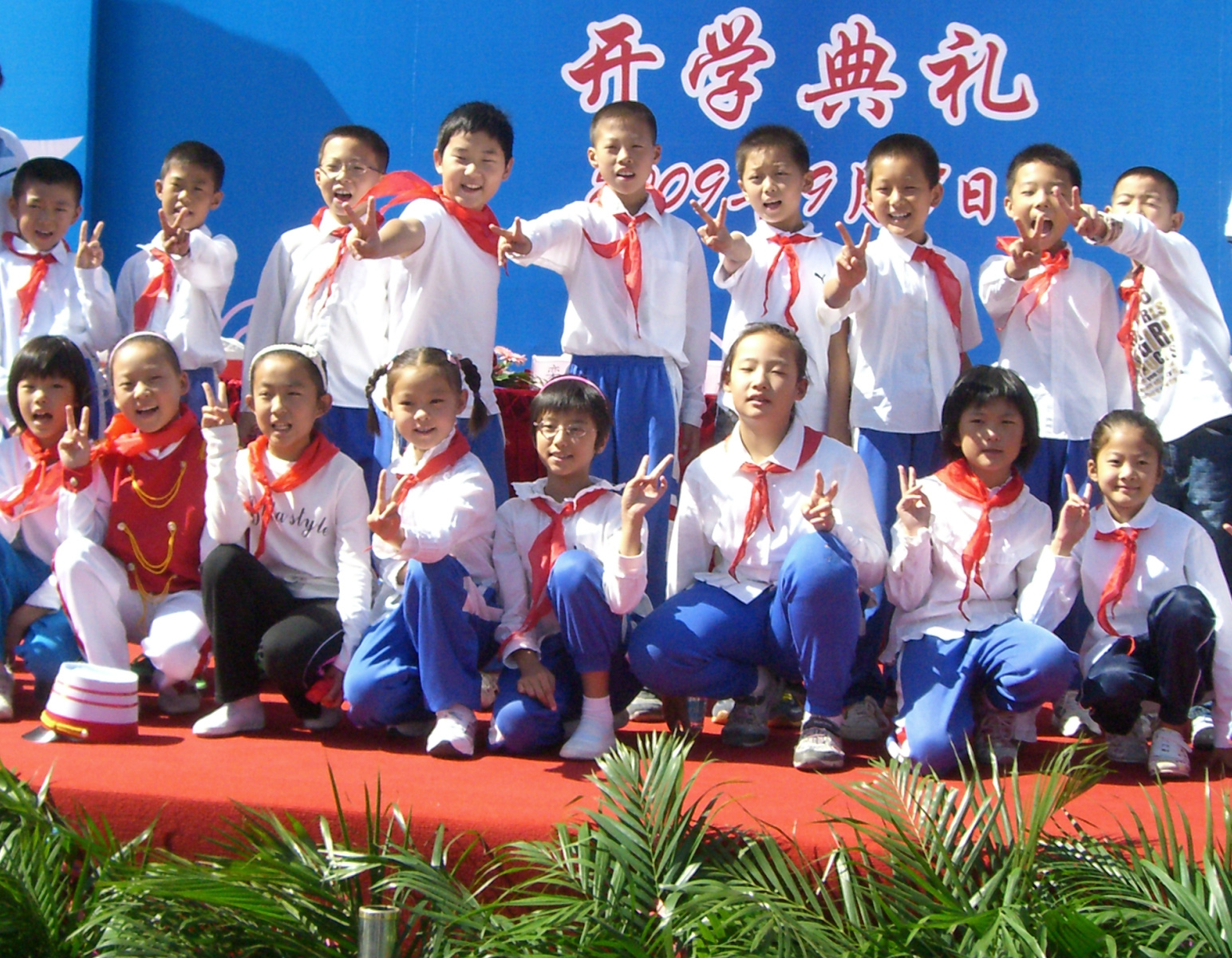
Young Pioneers of China, School Opening in 2008

Scouts have been banned in certain nations and remains banned in some of them. Some countries that have banned Scouts replaced it with youth organisations that are not considered part of the Scout Movement. The Soviet Union banned Scouts in 1922, creating a separate Young Pioneer organization of the Soviet Union, which gave birth to the Pioneer Movement. It still exists in some fashion in the People's Republic of China, Cuba, North Korea and Vietnam and has been turned into a nationalist movement in Tajikistan-the King Somoni Inheritance. There are no externally recognised Scout organisations in Cuba, North Korea, Laos, and the People's Republic of China (except Hong Kong and Macau, which each have a Scout organisation).

In many parts of Europe the socialist Red Falcons form the International Falcon Movement - Socialist Education International (IFM-SEI). The Woodcraft Folk is the UK associate of IFM-SEI. These organisations adapt many of the methods of Scouts in a socialist orientation. Examples are the Children's Republic, camps run by the SJD-The Falken in Germany in the 1920s, however unlike the concurring Pioneer Movements, IFM–SEI works to further democracy.

Other politically based youth movements still in existence include Fianna na hÉireann, an Irish republican youth movement.

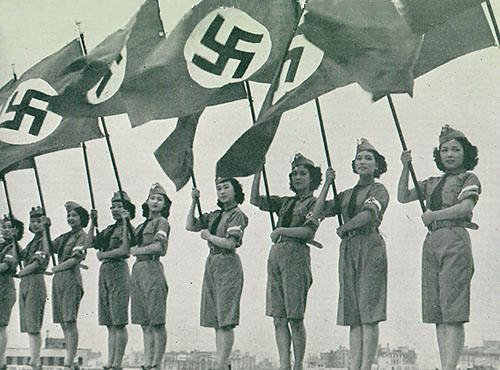
Japanese young ladies stage show for Hitlerjugend in 1938

Prior to World War II, Germany, Italy, Japan, Hungary and Romania disbanded Scout organizations. Germany created the Hitler-Jugend (Hitler Youth) organisation; Italy had a fascist youth organisation, the Balilla; and Romania under the Iron Guard had the Străjeria.

== Breakaway organisations ==
The Scout Movement is a pluralist movement not a unitary organisation. Before the formation of national Scout organisations and long before the formation of the World Organization of the Scout Movement in 1922, the Scout Movement had been well established for both boys and girls and Scouts was the purview of the world's youth. Boys and girls and adult leaders formed their own Scout patrols and only later were local Scout associations and national Scout organisations formed. Baden-Powell, in his book, Scouting for Boys, had not intended his Scout scheme to be containable by any one school of thought.

The Boys' Brigade Scouts, Church Scout Patrols, Church Lads Brigade Scouts, London Diocesan Boy Scout Corps, Chums Scout Patrols, YMCA Boy Scouts, Boys' Life Brigade Scouts, Salvation Army Corps Boy Scout troops (later formed into the Life-Saving Scouts), early Scout patrols, Scout troops and local Boy Scout associations such as the Battersea Boy Scouts (which became the British Boy Scouts in May 1909) and Baden-Powell's Boy Scout organization formed separately with some later affiliating or amalgamating.

Many groups have formed since the formation of the Scout "Boy Patrols." Some maintain that the WOSM is far more political than youth-oriented. They believe that WOSM and its member organizations have moved away from the original intent of the Scout Movement, because of political machinations that happen to longstanding organisations and they seek to return to the earliest, simplest methods. Others are a result of groups or individuals who refuse to follow the original Scout ideals but still desire to participate in Scout-like activities.

As the Scout Movement already existed as a pluralist movement, the formation of Baden-Powell's The Boy Scouts Association was a breakaway organisation from the Scout Movement. An early schism within the Scout Movement occurred from April 1909, when the Battersea Boy Scouts broke away after a brief affiliation with the Baden-Powell Boy Scouts organisation and was reconstituted as the British Boy Scouts and grew to comprise an estimated 25 percent of all Scouts in the United Kingdom but rapidly declined from 1912.. The Battersea Boy Scouts broke away because of perceptions of bureaucracy and militaristic tendencies in Baden-Powell Boy Scout organisation. The British Girl Scouts were the female counterpart of the British Boy Scouts. The British Boy Scouts allied with Scout organisations in the United States, Italy, Hong Kong, Canada, South Africa, Australia, New Zealand, South America and India and, in 1911, formed the 'Order of World Scouts' (OWS). In the United Kingdom, the British Boy Scouts with several smaller organisations, such as the Boy's Life Brigade Scouts, formed the National Peace Scouts federation. The OWS and British Boy Scouts survive to this day. The later formation of the World Organization of the Scout Movement in 1922, particularly by excluding many Scout organizations, was another breakaway organization from the Scout Movement.

In 1916 a group of Scoutmasters in Cambridge, led by Ernest Westlake and his son Aubrey, who believed that the movement had moved away from its early ideals and had lost its woodcraft character, founded the Order of Woodcraft Chivalry. The order survives to this day in England.

In the years following the First World War, the Commissioner for Camping and Woodcraft John Hargrave, broke with what he considered to be the Scouts' militaristic approach and founded a breakaway organisation, the Kibbo Kift, taking a number of similar-minded Scoutmasters and troops with him. This organisation was the direct antecedent of the Woodcraft Folk.

Many of the Woodcraft Folk's founders, including the prominent Leslie Paul, had been Boy Scouts and Scout leaders who left the Scout Movement to join the Kibbo Kift but then formed the Woodcraft Folk in 1925.

=== Traditional Scouts ===
Baden-Powell Scouts were formed in 1970 in the United Kingdom and later elsewhere, when it was felt that the "modernisation" of The Scout Association was abandoning the traditions and intentions established by Baden-Powell. Another modern breakaway group is the Christian American Heritage Girls, formed in 1995 in response to the perceived growing liberalism in the Girl Scouts of the USA. In Canada and to some extent in the United States, there is a traditional Scout movement, seeking to take the Scout Movement back to its origins of ideals and methods.

=== Scouts-in-Exile ===
Scouts-in-Exile groups were formed overseas from their native country as a result of war and changes in governments. For the Scouts-in-exile groups, serving the community outside their homelands, there is resentment that they were not recognised during their nations' totalitarian periods. These groups often provided postal delivery and other basic services in displaced-persons camps. A number of exile Scout groups have their own national and multinational organizations, hold regional and world jamborees, issue training materials, and furnish leadership.

== See also ==
- List of non-aligned Scouting organizations
- Scouting controversy and conflict
