= Raingutter regatta =

US sailboat competition for Cub Scouts

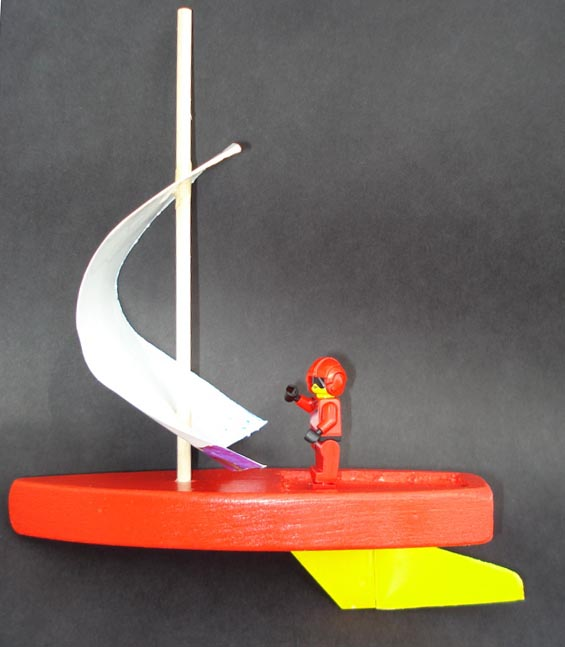
- A raingutter regatta sailboat
- Owner: Boy Scouts of America
- Country: United States of America
- Date: Annual

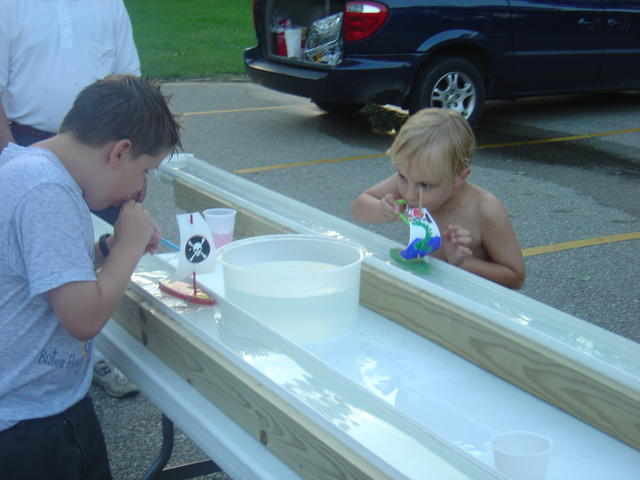
Cub Scouts compete in a raingutter regatta race

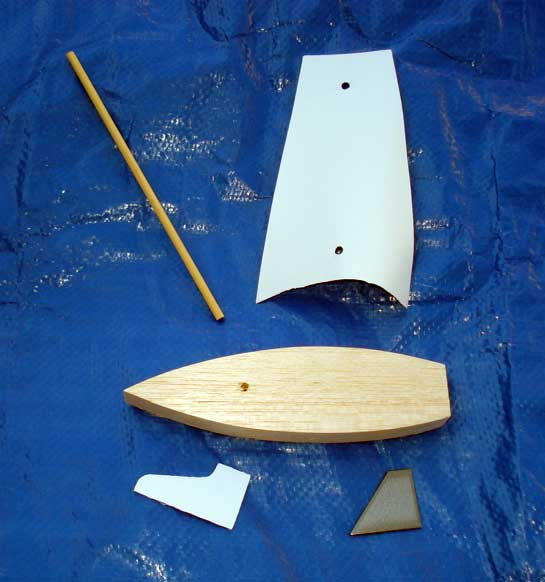
Raingutter regatta kit parts: mast, sail, hull, rudder and keel

The raingutter regatta is a racing event for Cub Scouts in the Boy Scouts of America that is the sailboat equivalent of the pinewood derby.

The sailboat kit consists of a seven-inch (178 mm) long balsa wood hull, a 6 1/2-inch mast, plastic sail, plastic rudder, and metal keel. Within the basic design rules, Scouts are free to paint and decorate their sailboats as they choose. Modifications for speed include the placement of the keel and rudder and the size, shape and location of the sail. A catamaran is an exceptionally fast design, although this modification is not allowed in all races.

== Racing ==
The boats are raced in a standard rain gutter that is ten feet long, placed on a table or saw horses, and filled to the top with water. The boats are propelled by blowing on the sail, either directly or through a drinking straw; the boat cannot be touched with hands or the straw. The first boat to reach the end of the gutter is the winner. The overall winner is determined by an elimination system.

== Other races ==
Other youth groups have adopted the event for their programs under different names:

- Pioneer Clubs: Sailboat Race
- Awana Clubs: Awana Regatta, Sail On Night
- Christian Service Brigade: Shape N Sail Derby

== See also ==
- Space derby
- Kon-Tiki (Scouting)
- Model yachting
- Ship model
- Radio-controlled boat
- Bicycle rodeo
