= Space derby =

Toy racing event for Cub Scouts

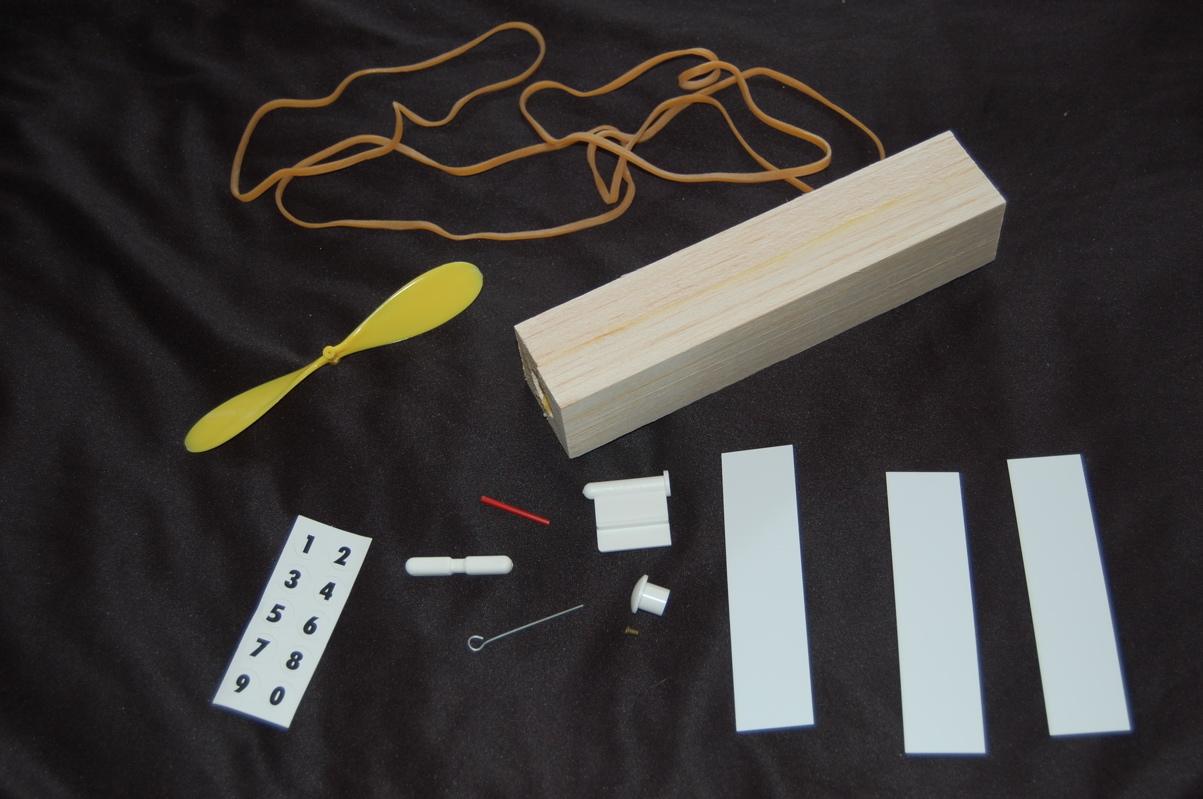
- Space derby kit
- Owner: Boy Scouts of America
- Country: United States
- Dates: Annual

The space derby was a racing event for Cub Scouts in the Boy Scouts of America that is similar to the pinewood derby car race. Cub Scouts (the young-age division of the Boy Scouts) race miniature balsa wood gliders that are propelled by a rubber band and propeller. During the 1960s, this was also known as the "rocket derby".

== Construction ==
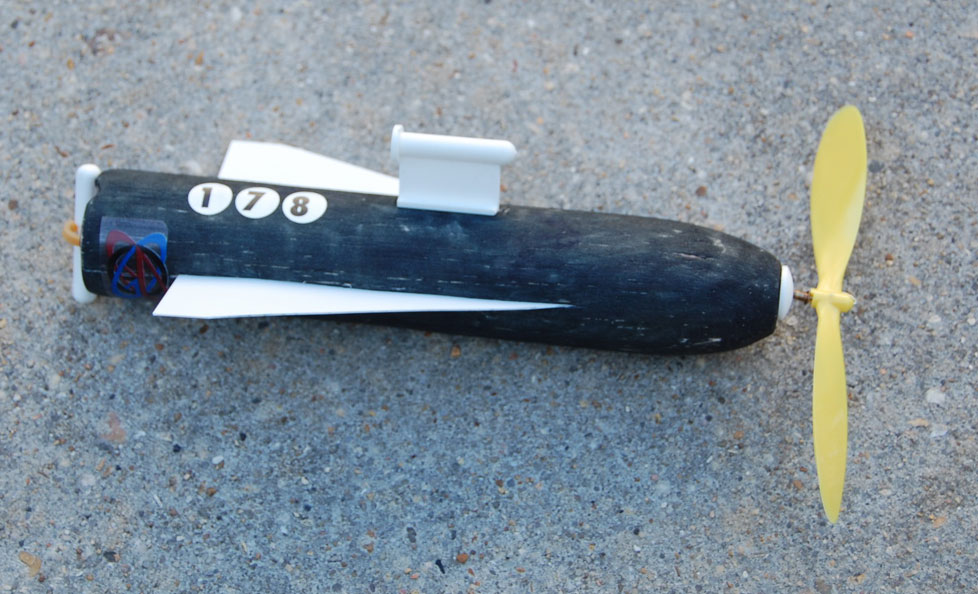
Space derby glider

The space derby kit consisted of a balsa wood block, propeller assembly, rubber bands, plastic sheet (for fins), and a mounting bracket. The wood block came out of the box with a drilled out center hole. The block was carved into the desired shape, sanded and painted. The mounting bracket and fins could be added either before or after painting. The rubber band was inserted through the center hole with one end on the propeller and the other held in a cross-piece at the rear.

== Race ==
The completed gliders were wound up with as many as 100 or more turns on the propeller and suspended on a string from a separate bracket with the propeller held in place. Two, three or four string lanes were typically used. The gliders were held in place and launched when the mechanism released the propeller.

== Retirement ==
In 2022, the supplier of space derby kits experienced supply-chain issues and was no longer able to make the kits available. After a review of participation in the program over the previous several years, the National Council decided to retire the space derby program.

== See also ==
- Raingutter regatta
