= Students Today Leaders Forever =

- Abbreviation: STLF
- Founded: 2003
- Founder: Brian Peterson; Greg Tehven; Irene Fernando; Nick Lindberg
- Dissolved: May 2018
- Type: Youth development
- Purpose: To reveal leadership through service, relationships, and action.
- Location: Minneapolis, MN
- Region served: United States
- Product: Pay It Forward Tour; Leadership Camp
- Key people: Joe Delgado, Board Chair
- Revenue: $1,000,000
- Employees: 8
- Volunteers: 30,375

Students Today Leaders Forever's (STLF) was a non-profit organization that engaged in and encouraged servant leadership, primarily carrying this out through facilitating cross-country service trips, called "Pay it Forward Tour"s, for students within the United States. The mission of the organization was to reveal leadership through service, relationships, and action as a result of these tours. STLF allowed voluntary participation to students in the middle school, high school, and collegiate level. STLF stated its purpose was to provide leadership experience and encourage students to become catalysts for positive change in their own lives, schools, and communities. Before dissolving, it had chapters at 32 universities in 10 states. It dissolved in May 2018, citing "challenges in program participation and fundraising".

== History ==
STLF was founded in September 2003 at the University of Minnesota by four Carlson School of Management freshmen. STLF's first Pay It Forward Tour went out in March 2004. In total, 788 Pay It Forward Tours were completed with 30,375 total participants. STLF's national office was headquartered in Minneapolis, with student-led college chapters and programming partnerships with many high schools and middle schools across the United States. The following is a timeline of various STLF milestones:

Date	Milestone
September 2003	STLF Founded
March 2004	First Pay It Forward Tour
May 2005	Incorporated as Non-Profit
September 2007	First Full-Time Employees Begin
June 2008	Awarded Social Entrepreneur's Cup

== Programs ==
The Pay It Forward Tour was a multi-day volunteer trip focused on service, education, and reflection. Groups of students traveled by charter bus across the United States and volunteered in a new city each day of a 9-day trip, intentionally coinciding with Spring Break for many universities. Lodging accommodations were organized through non-profits who willingly allowed STLF volunteers to sleep overnight in their facilities without pay. On arrival, students participated in a single or variety of group service activities, toured the city, and participated in leadership exercises and bonding activities. As tours continued, leadership activities were to become more personal to the groups of students in conjunction with attempts at increased internal bonding and exploration of concepts such as personal struggles, societal pressures, and individual growth. While city destinations were unique for each tour, all tours concluded with a final stop at one of each year's "destination cities" where an organization-wide service project was held with all schools arriving, in addition to celebratory activities, titled the "Yeah Buddy Bash". Use of the phrase "Yeah Buddy" and the Sign of the horns together was encouraged as part of the culture of the organization. Each attendee paid $525 per trip to accommodate for gasoline expenses and twice-daily meals.

Each "Pay it Forward Tour" was planned and facilitated by volunteer student leadership within a chapter. Three to five individuals worked together in a shared leadership model called the Core Model. The Core Model allowed the individuals involved to work toward a common purpose. The purpose of the model was for the "Core" to work together to share overarching areas, while opting into individuals strengths and role-specific responsibility areas.

In addition to the Pay It Forward Tour, STLF held Summer Leadership Camps for college chapter leaders. Leadership Training was also hosted for students.

== Accomplishments ==
The Engaged Philanthropy Conference awarded STLF the 2008 Social Entrepreneur's Cup – an honor recognizing Minnesota's top innovator for social change. TIME Magazine used STLF and the Pay it Forward Tour as an example within its #2 Way to Serve America in ’21 Ways to Serve America.' In 2010, STLF was recognized as the first organization to complete its Accountability Wizard review featuring the Council's new Accountability Standards.
