= Pinewood derby =

Wood car racing event

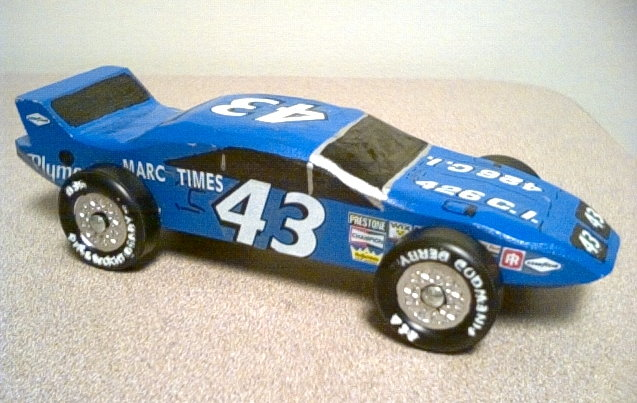
- Petty Superbird
- Owner: Scouting America
- Country: United States
- Dates: Annual
- Website pinewoodderby.org

The Pinewood Derby is the wood car racing event of the Cub Scout Program of Scouting America. Pinewood derbies are often run by packs of the Cub Scouts program. With the help of adults, Cub Scouts build their own unpowered, unmanned miniature cars from wood, usually from kits containing a block of pine wood, plastic wheels, stickers with numbers, and metal axles. With the popularity of the pinewood derby, other organizations have developed similar events. Pinewood derby is a registered trademark of Scouting America so most use different names. Each derby has slightly different rules for making and racing their cars. A small industry has developed to provide organizer equipment (e.g. tracks, timers, and scales) and awards (e.g. trophies and ribbons).

Similar Cub Scouting events include the raingutter regatta (a race for miniature boats) and the space derby (a race for rubber band-driven propeller shuttles).

== Origins ==
2003 patch honoring Don Murphy and celebrating the 50th anniversary of the derby

The first pinewood derby was held on May 15, 1953 (73 years ago) at the Scout House in Manhattan Beach, California, by Cub Scout Pack 280C (the present Pack 713). The concept was created by the Pack's Cubmaster Don Murphy, and sponsored by the Management Club at North American Aviation.

Murphy's son was too young to participate in the popular Soap Box Derby races, so he came up with the idea of racing miniature wood cars. The cars had the same gravity-powered concept as the full-size Soap Box Derby cars, but were much smaller and easier to build.

Murphy and the Management Club of North American Aviation sent out thousands of brochures to anyone who requested more information. The idea spread rapidly, and competitions were held across the country, mainly with recreation departments and nonprofit organizations, including the Los Angeles County Department of Recreation. Of all that early enthusiasm, however, only the Boy Scouts of America made it part of an official program. The National Director of Cub Scouting Service, O. W. (Bud) Bennett, wrote Murphy: "We believe you have an excellent idea, and we are most anxious to make your material available to the Cub Scouts of America." Within the year, the Boy Scouts of America adopted the pinewood derby for use in all Cub Scout packs.

In its October 1954 issue, Boys' Life publicized the event and offered plans for the track and a car, which featured "four wheels, four nails, and three blocks of wood."

Murphy continued to run the derby program through the Management Club until his retirement from North American Aviation in 1978. He died in 2008.

In 2003, Pack 713 celebrated the 50th Pinewood Derby along with Packs 287, 759, 275, and former Cub Scouts from the 1953 Pack 280c. A shoulder patch for the Western Los Angeles County Council that depicted a pinewood derby car and a message of honor to Murphy was released to celebrate the 50th anniversary of the event.

In 1980, the design of the block was changed from a cutout block, consistent with a 1940s style front-engined Indy 500 car, to a rectangular block. The tires were also changed from narrow, hard plastic, to wider "slicks."

In May 2005, the Boy Scouts of America registered Pinewood Derby as an official trademark.

On May 28, 2018, the City of Manhattan Beach, CA held a 65th Anniversary Pinewood Derby Day at the original Scout House (the very place the first Boy Scout PWD race was held in 1953). There were three 35 ft tracks and all cars competing were required to meet official BSA rules. “Pinus Ferrari”, built by Henry M. Caroselli, set Fast Time of Day of 2.501 sec. This fundraising event was well attended (nostalgically, even a few participants showed up with their over-60-year-old cars), with all proceeds going to support the building of a new Senior and Scout Community Center.

== Construction ==
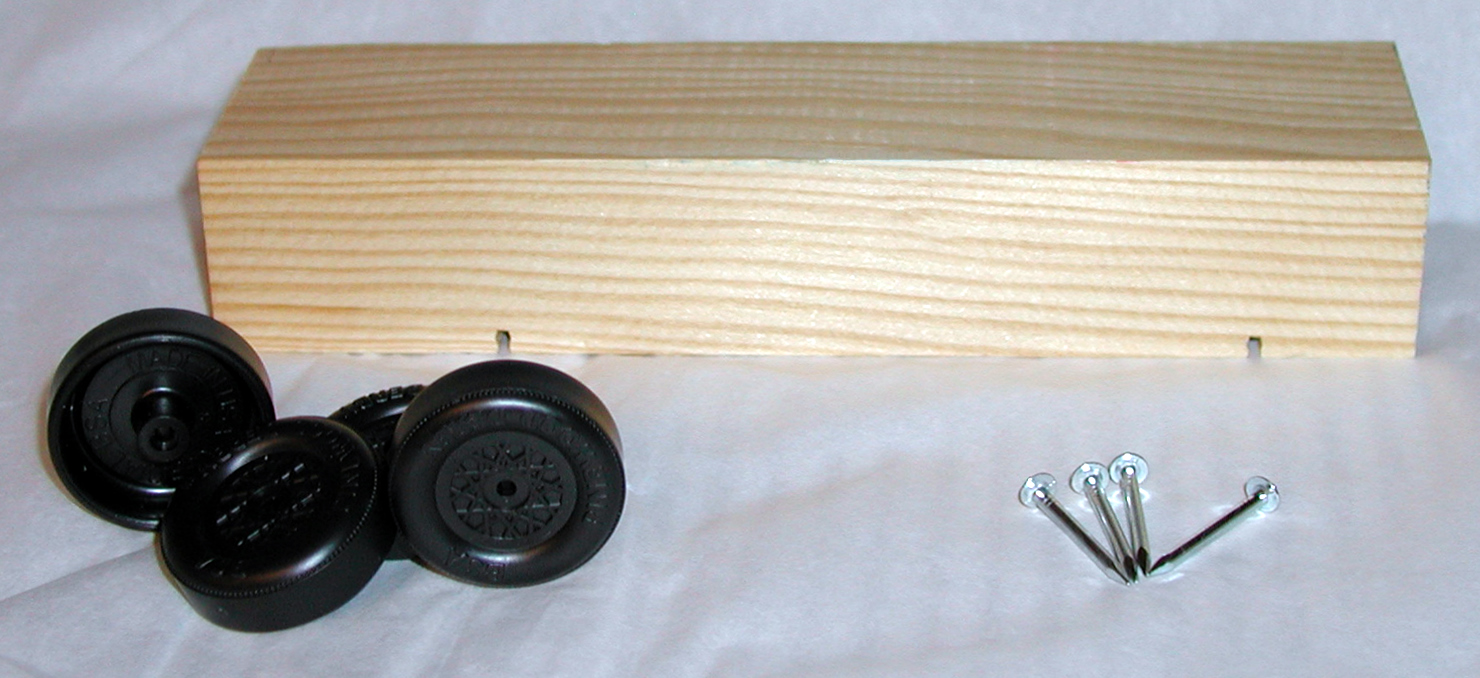
Official car kit

When using a kit sold through Boy Scouts of America (BSA), the Scout begins with a block of wood, four plastic wheels, and four nails for axles. The finished car must use all nine pieces, must not exceed a certain weight (usually five ounces (140 grams)), must not exceed a certain width (usually 2 3/4 inches (7.0 cm)) and length (usually 7 inches (18 cm)) and must fit on the track used by that particular Scout pack.

Blocks can be whittled with a hand knife, bandsaw, or a carving tool. Other than the previous basic design rules, the Cub Scout is able to carve and decorate the car as he or she chooses. Cars vary from unfinished blocks to whimsical objects, to accurate replicas of actual cars. Weights can be added to the final design to bring the car to the maximum allowable weight. A high-density metal weight, such as tungsten carbide which is not toxic like lead, reduces the volume of wood, which reduces air friction and increases speed. Axle friction can be reduced by polishing the nails and applying graphite as a lubricant.

== Competition ==
The track usually has two to eight lanes and slopes down to the ground, since the cars are powered by gravity. Tracks may be owned by the pack or rented. The race is run in heats, giving every car the chance to run on each lane. The racers can be grouped with others from the same rank (Tiger Cubs, Wolf Cubs, Bear Cubs, etc.), or can compete against the pack as a whole.

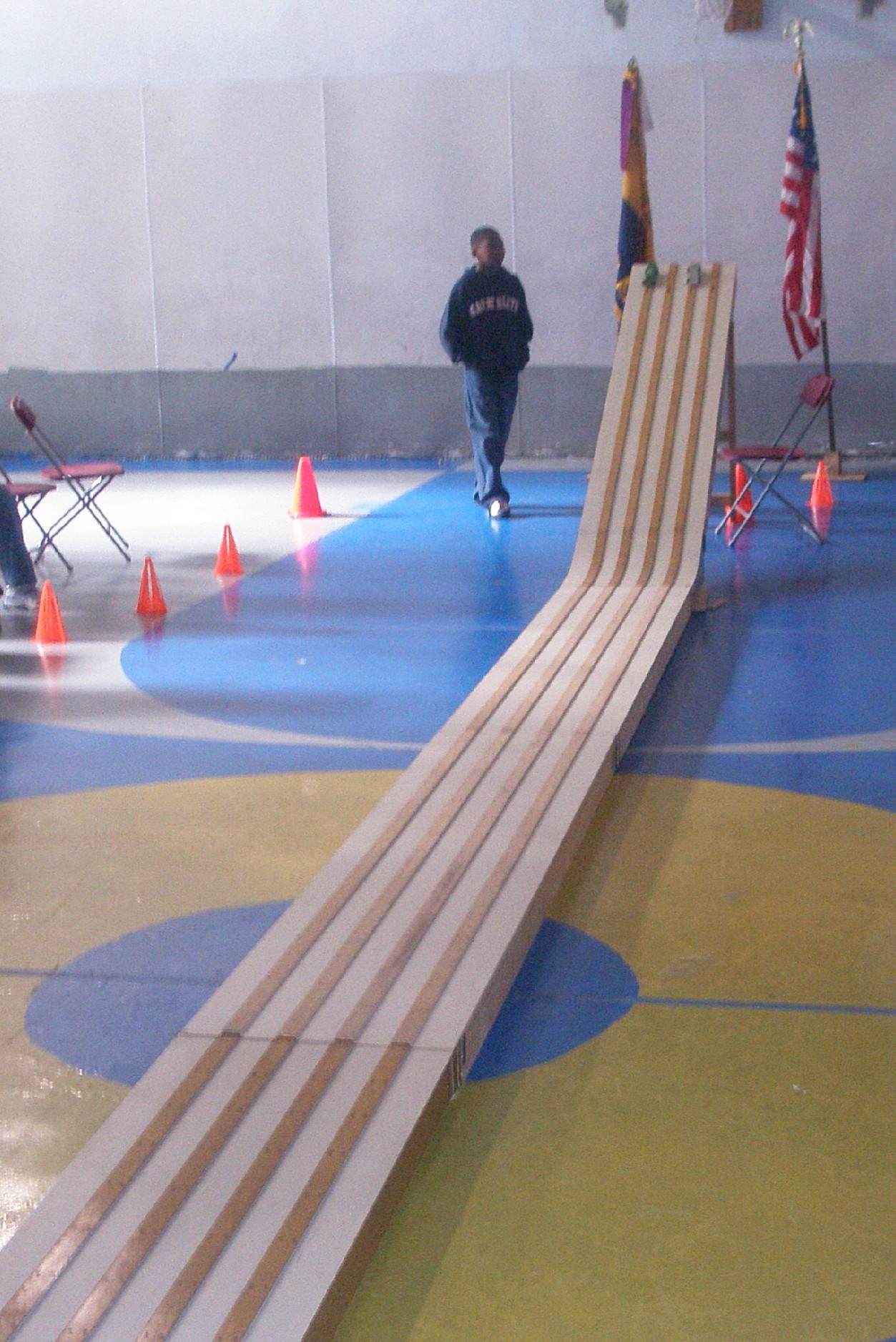
Car track in Philadelphia

First, second, and third-place winners usually receive ribbons, medals, or trophies. Some packs also award on the basis of car design or styling. The first place race winners get to advance to the district level, then each of the district-wide race winners get to race each other from across the entire council.

== Car modifications ==
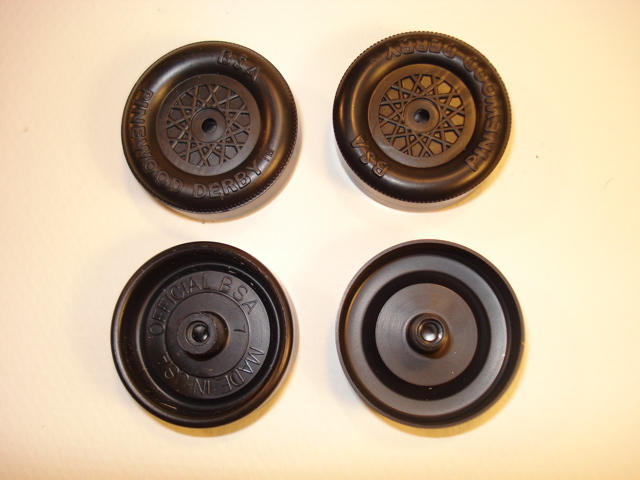
Stock wheels (left) and modified (one gram) wheels (right)

The force accelerating a pinewood derby car is gravity; the opposing forces are friction and air drag. Therefore, car modifications are aimed at maximizing the potential energy in the car design and minimizing the air drag and the friction that occurs when the wheel spins on the axle, contacts the axle head or car body, or contacts the track guide rail. Friction due to air drag is a minor factor worthy of attention. The wheel tread can be sanded or turned on a lathe and the inner surface of the hub can be tapered to minimize the contact area between the hub and body. Polishing the wheel, especially the inner hub, with a plastic polish can also reduce friction. Often one front wheel is raised slightly so that it does not contact the track and add to the rolling resistance. Axles are filed or turned on a lathe to remove the burr and crimp marks and polished smooth. More extensive modifications involve tapering the axle head and cutting a notch to minimize the wheel-to-axle contact area. Packs can establish additional rules for what, if any, modifications are allowed. In some areas, no changes can be made to the axles or wheels.

A second consideration is the rotational energy stored in the wheels. The pinewood derby car converts gravitational potential energy into translational kinetic energy (speed) plus rotational energy. Heavier wheels have a greater moment of inertia and their spinning takes away energy that would otherwise contribute to the speed of the car. A standard wheel has a mass of 2.6 g, but this can be reduced to as little as 1 g by removing material from the inside of the wheel. A raised wheel can reduce the rotational energy up to one-quarter, but this advantage is less with a bumpy track.

Another consideration is the track itself. A track that is mostly sloping, with little flat at the end, can allow cars with minimal mass in their wheels to shine. However, a track with a steep slope and then a long flat section can penalize such cars due to the quick loss of energy they experience once they have reached the bottom, when all potential energy has been transferred to kinetic and rotational energy. Such cars will take a lead on the downslope, but may be passed by cars with more energy "stored" away as rotational energy on the flat.

A proper lubricant, typically graphite powder, is essential. Wheel alignment is important both to minimize wheel contact with the axle head and body as well as to limit the contact between the wheels and guide rail as the car travels down the track. There are 32 friction causing surfaces on a pinewood derby car. These include the surfaces of all four wheels which touch either the axle, the body, or the track and the surfaces of all four axles which touch the wheel. Neglecting to polish and lubricate any of these 32 surfaces will result in degraded performance. The center of mass of a typical car is low and slightly ahead of the rear axle, which helps the car track straight as well as providing a slight advantage due to the additional gravitational potential energy.

== Adult Professional League Racing ==
Things have certainly changed over time as designs and techniques have improved and cars have become progressively faster, the birth of the national professional adult racing leagues in the early 2000s ushered in a new level of pinewood derby car performance. These leagues, consisting of racers from all over the country with varying backgrounds (engineers, scientists, mechanics, educators, computer programmers, technology enthusiasts, etc.), have raised the bar on what makes a fast pinewood derby car. As reported in Popular Science "Having assembled the racers as kids and guided their own children through the sport, these grown men now want to earn their own bragging rights." The current national racing league is the Association of Pinewood Racers (APR) https://apr.boards.net/. Races are held 6-8 times per year with a point system and a Championship at the end of the season. There are trophies and prize money for winners. There are multiple classes with different rules for each. The racer can enter as many cars in whatever category they choose. The racer builds their car(s) and mails them to the race location; the race is streamed live online. The cars are sent back to the racer to make any needed adjustments to improve for the next race.

== Legacy ==
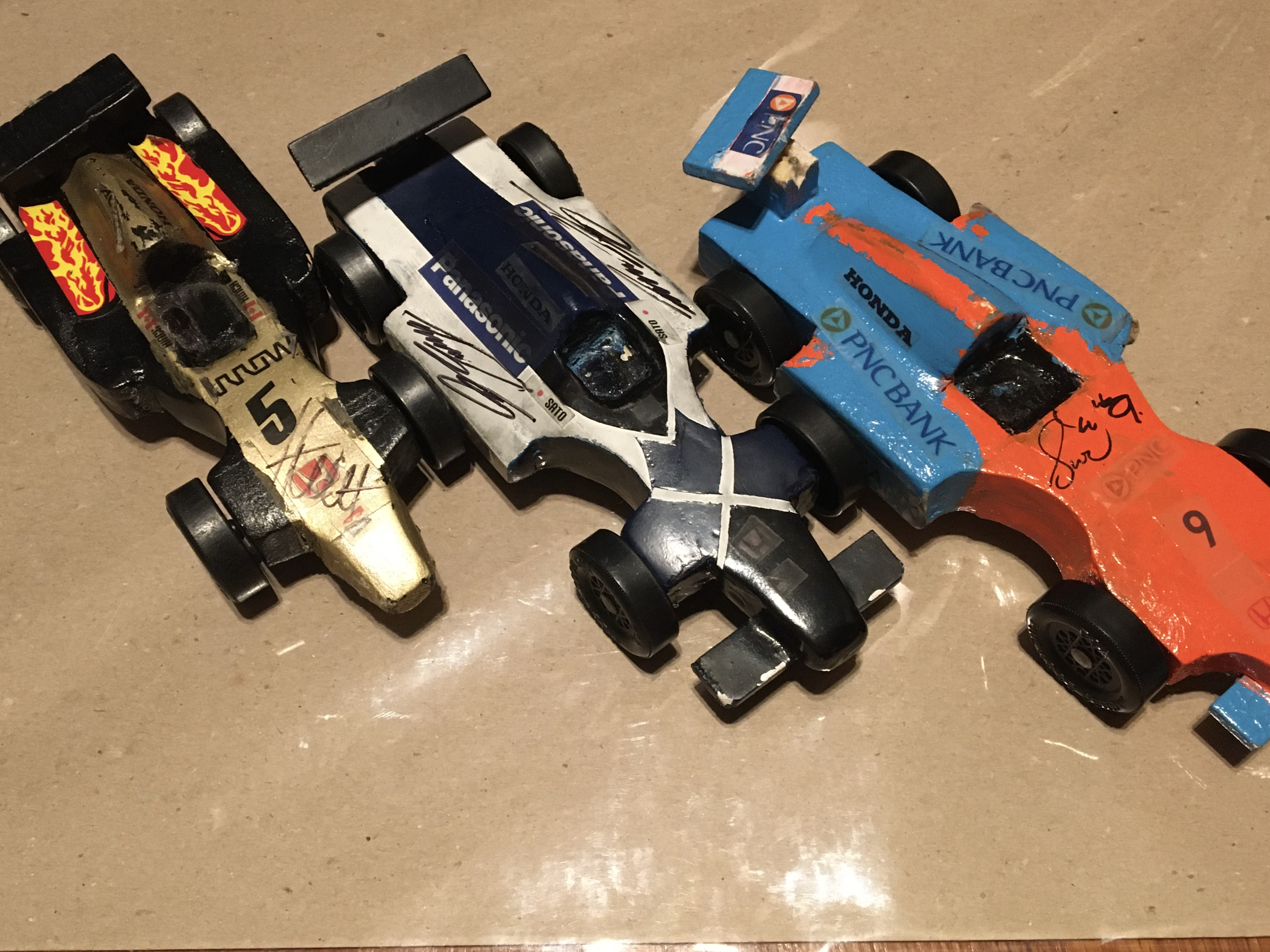
Pinewood Derby cars modeled after James Hinchcliffe's, Takuma Sato's, and Scott Dixon's Indycars with each signed by the respective driver.

The pinewood derby was selected as part of "America's 100 Best" in 2006 as "a celebrated rite of spring" by Reader's Digest. The event has also been parodied by South Park in the episode "Pinewood Derby" and in the film Down and Derby.

== Gallery ==
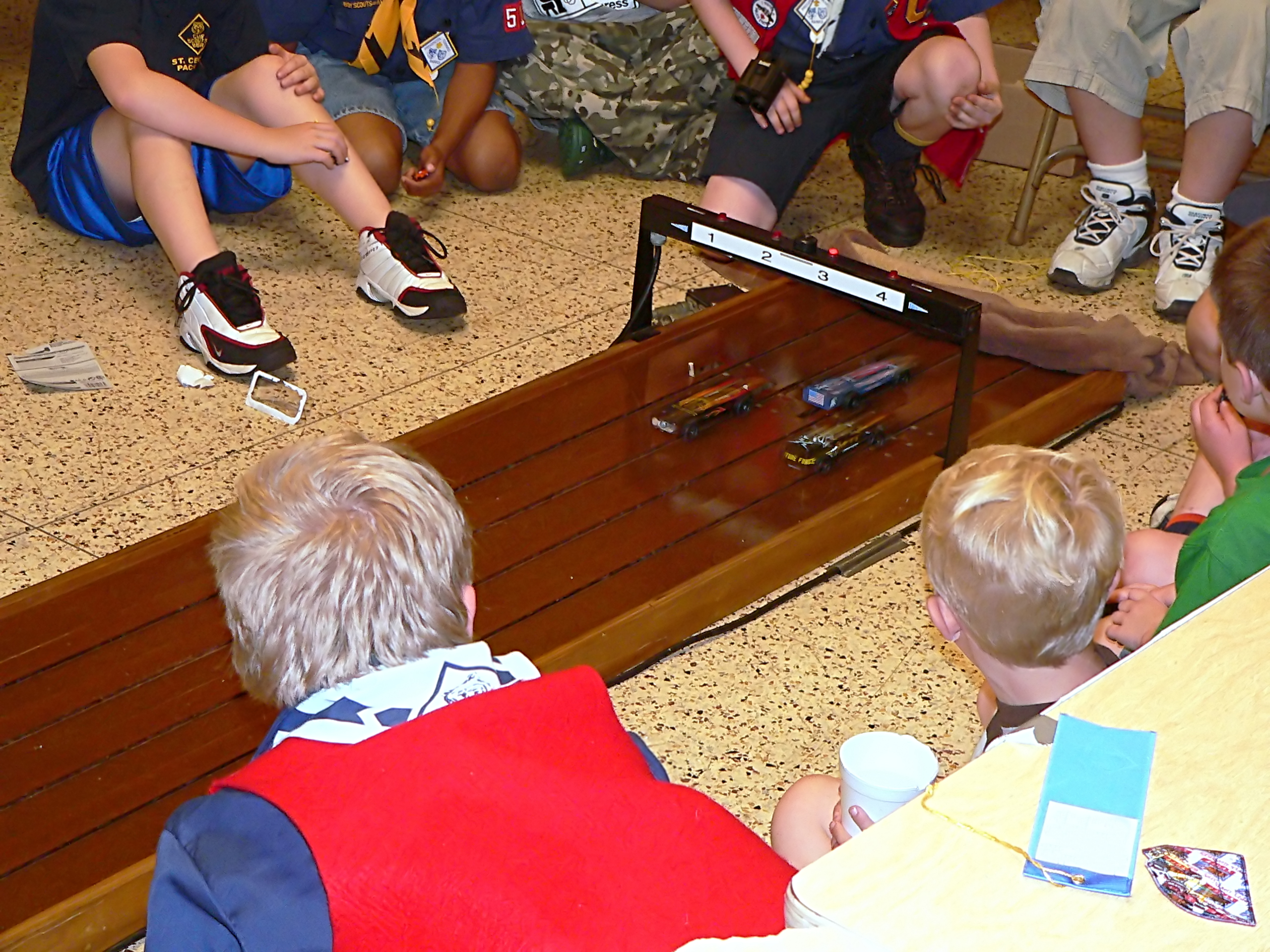
Finish of a Pinewood Derby heat.

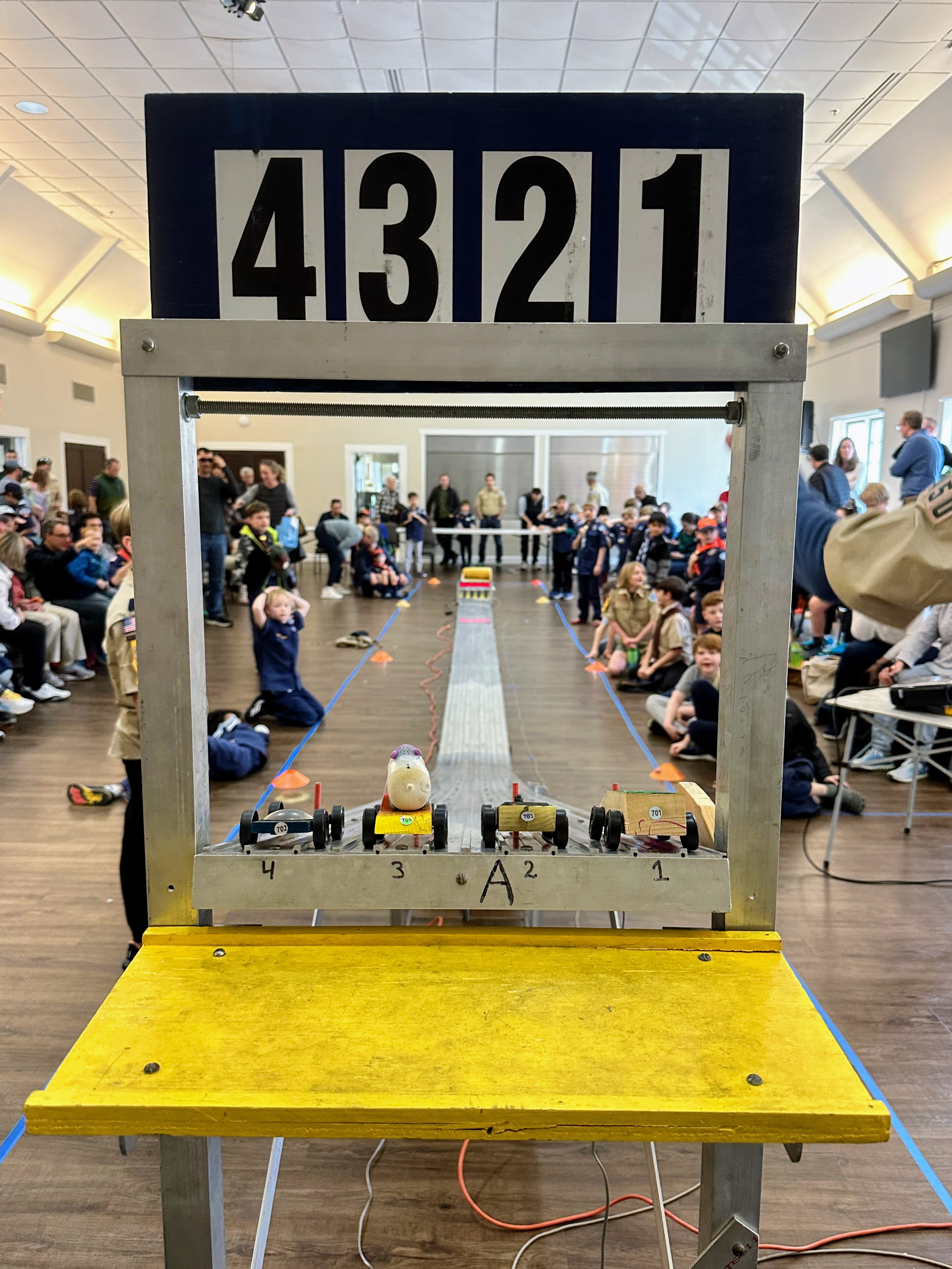
Starting blocks of a race.

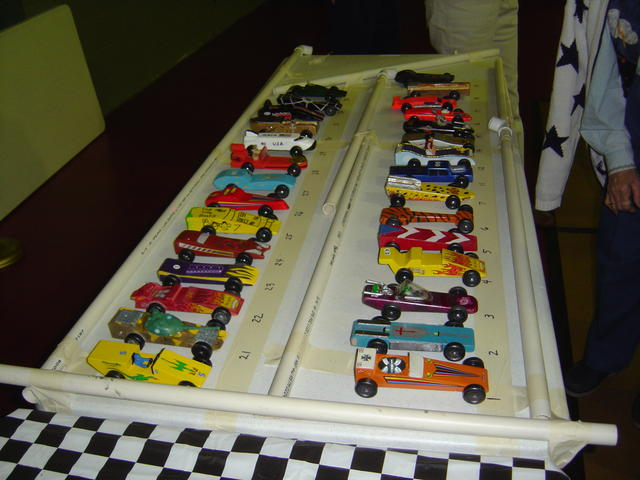
Pinewood derby cars ready to race

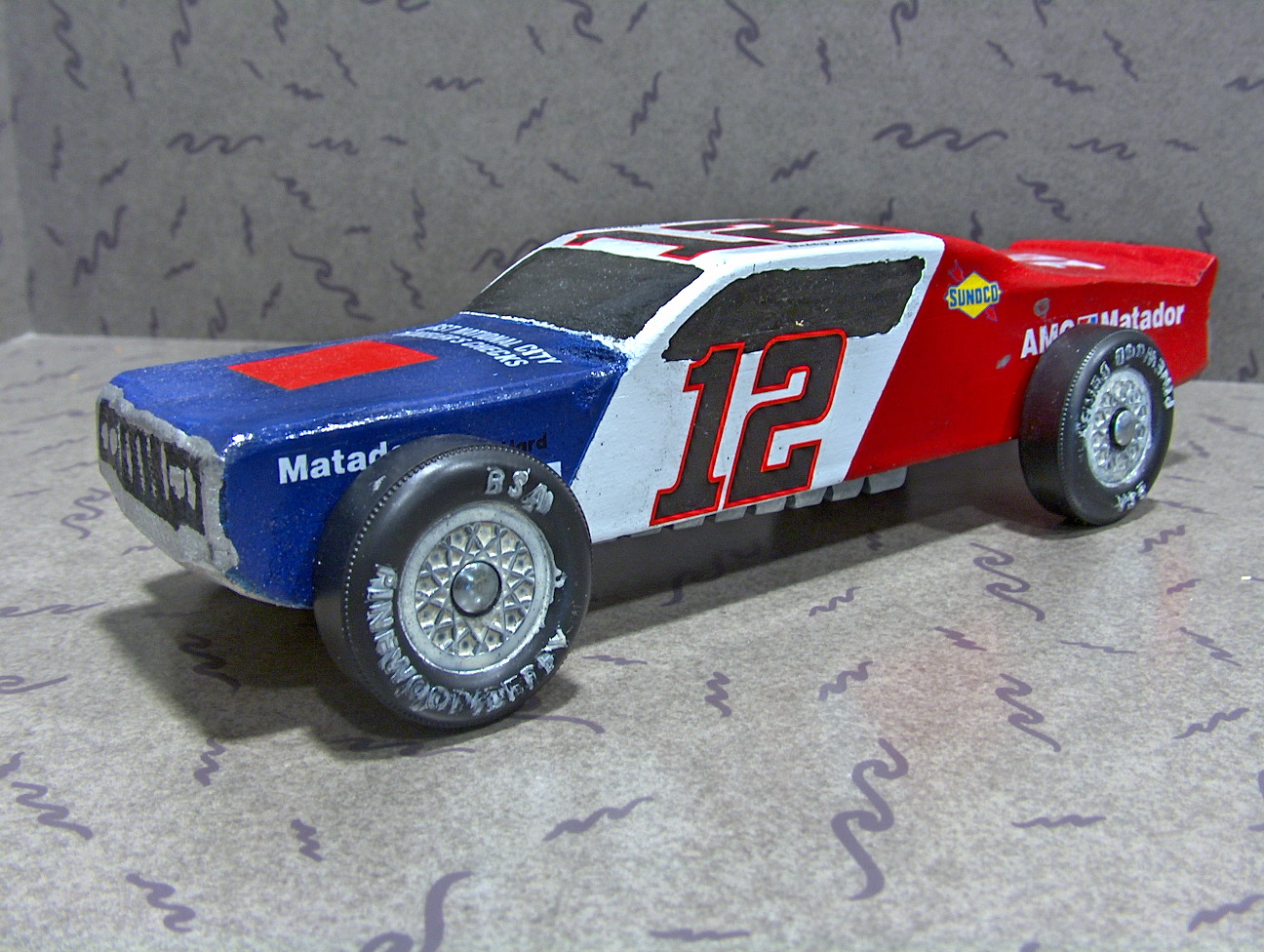
Pinewood Derby Donahue 1972 AMC Matador

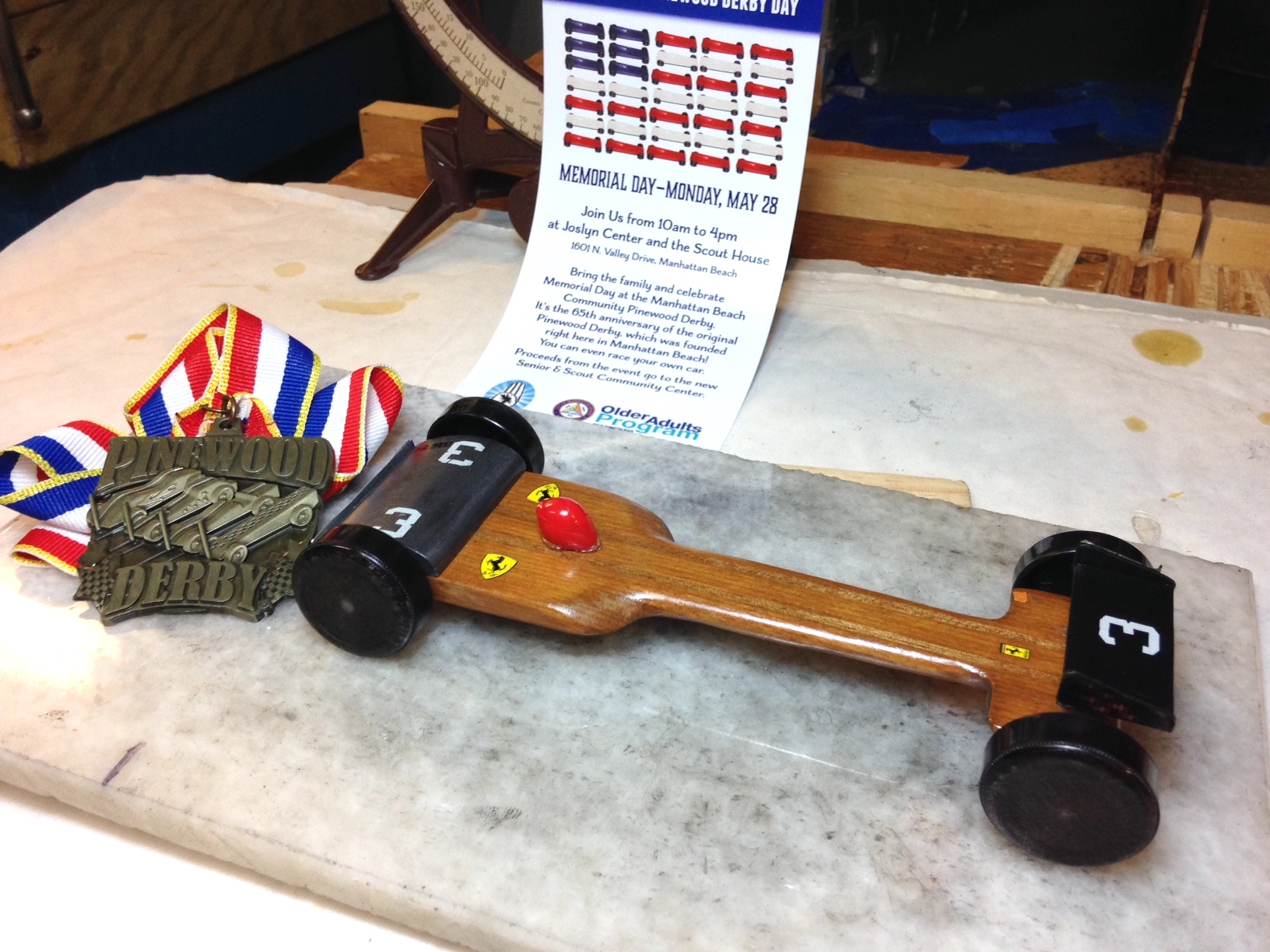
"Pinus Ferrari" Winner 65th-Anniv. Manhattan Beach Pinewood Derby Day 2018, built by Henry M. Caroselli

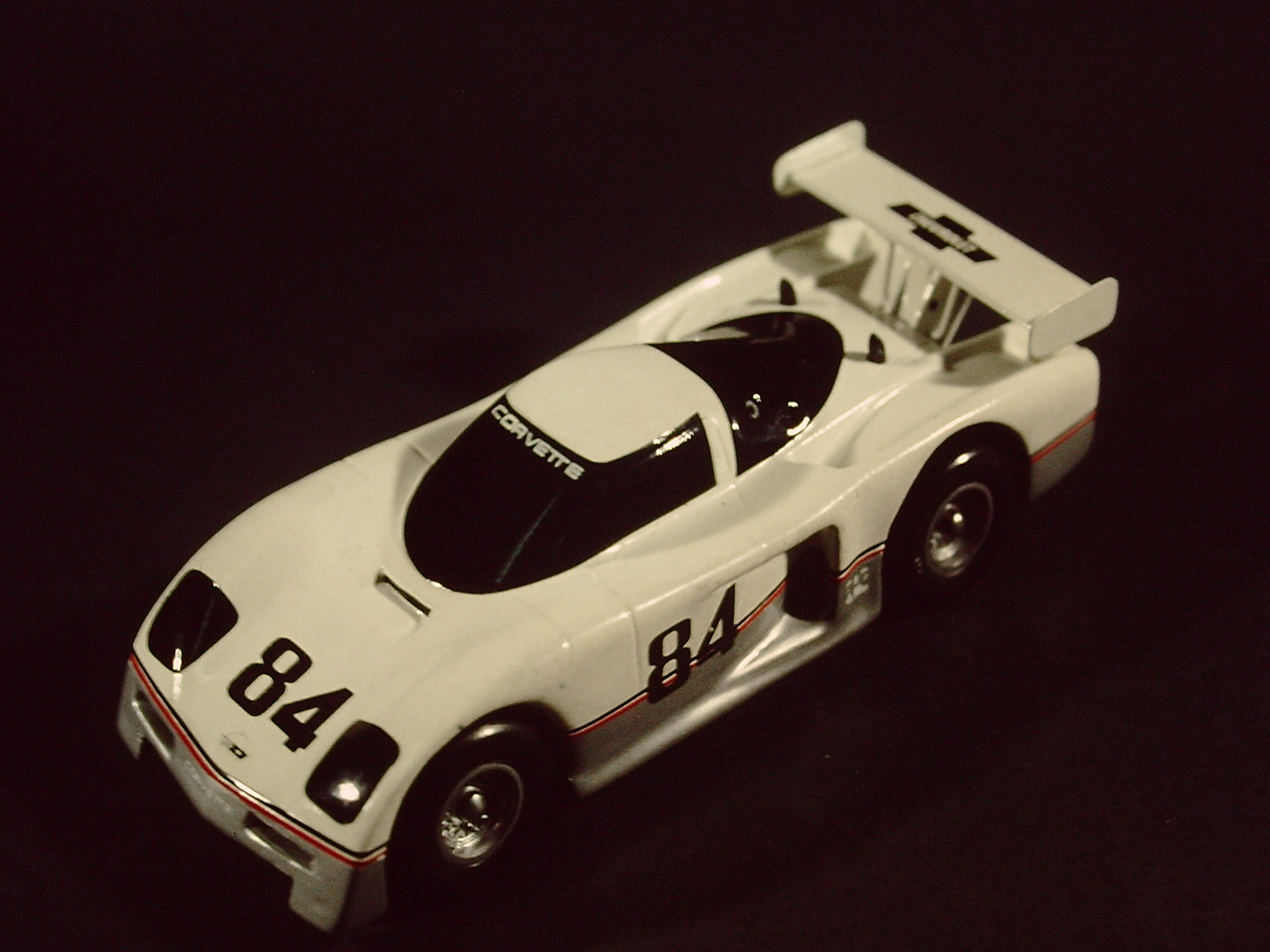
Pinewood derby car modeled after the IMSA GTP Corvette
