= Navigators USA =

American Scouting organization

- Age range: Stargazers: 4-6 (All genders); Junior Navigators: 7–11 (All genders); Navigators: 11–18 (All genders)
- Location: United States, United Kingdom
- Country: United States
- Founded: 2003
- Membership: 167 chapters
- Executive Director: Robin Bossert
- Website navigatorsusa.org

Navigators USA is an American non-aligned Scouting organization that was founded in 2003 in New York City.

As of 2011, Navigators USA has more than 100 chapters across the United States and further groups in Europe. Navigators is open to all genders between ages 4 and 18. Navigators is based on ideas of consensus and allows for multi-age interactions where children can mentor each other. It is open to all regardless of sexual orientation or religious belief.

The mission of the Navigators is:

- To bring nature to boys and girls ages 7–18, whether it's in their own backyard or the Rocky Mountains.
- To create a safe environment for children to test the skills they will need to navigate life.
- To help children build their own community to achieve goals they set for themselves.

== History ==
In 2003, Navigators USA was founded by a group of volunteers serving children in need in East Harlem, New York. They wanted to offer a Scouting experience for boys and girls that was non-discriminatory and secular. They felt there was a need for an alternative organization that approached Scouting from a different perspective than the established organizations.

Robin Bossert started the Navigators after facing a moral dilemma. The Boy Scouts of America, besides not allowing girls or gay youth, also required that boys believe in a supreme being. Due to these exclusionary practices, Bossert created the alternative Scouting group that would become the Navigators USA.

In the fall of 2010 a 188-page Navigators guidebook was completed and the new group became public. Bossert credits the guidebook for an increase in current interest. Not only does the guidebook teach outdoor skills it also has all the information to start Navigators.

In 2011, incumbent Mayor of New York City Michael Bloomberg stated at a fund-raiser at Christie's that "by belonging to the Navigators, boys and girls get the guidance and adult-supervised adventure that only Scouting can offer—in an atmosphere free of any stigma about sexual orientation. And as a proud Eagle Scout who has publicly told the Boy Scouts to change their wrong-headed anti-gay policy, I say 'Amen' to that!"

In 2017, Navigators USA won a $9,500 grant for the completion of their Badge Book.

== UK Navigators ==
The first Navigators Chapter in the United Kingdom started in January 2014 in Kingskerswell, Devon, with groups subsequently opened in Cornwall, Devon, Hereford, Kent and Yorkshire. In 2019, there were five Navigator groups operating in England.

== Program ==
The Navigators USA Moral Compass

As a navigator I promise to do my best
To help create a world free of prejudice and ignorance,
To treat people of every race, creed, lifestyle and ability with dignity and respect,
To strengthen my body and Improve my mind to reach my full potential,
To protect our planet and preserve our freedom.

— The Navigators USA Guidebook, page 3

The organization has three program sections: Stargazers, for children ages 4–6; Junior Navigators, age 7–10; and Senior Navigators age 11–18.

Junior Navigators have three levels:

- Mira
- Vega
- Polaris

The Senior section has four levels:

- Shadow
- Tracker
- Pilot
- Navigator

The program's top award is the Summit Achievement Award.
