= American Heritage Girls =

Christian Scouting-like organization

- Headquarters: Cincinnati, Ohio
- Country: United States
- Founded: 1995
- Founder: Patti Garibay
- Membership: 52,000 (2020)
- Executive Director: Patti Garibay
- Website americanheritagegirls.org

The American Heritage Girls (AHG) is a Christian Scout-like organization for Americans. The organization has more than 52,000 members (2020) with troops or individuals ("trailblazers") in all 50 states of the United States and for American expatriates in fifteen other countries.

Their stated youth membership standard is that it is for "All biological girls of any color, race, national origin and socioeconomic status who agree to live according to the standards of the AHG Oath and the AHG Creed". Adult leaders must subscribe to a Trinitarian Christian statement of faith.

== History ==
Year	Units	Adults	Girls
1995			100
2005	210		8,000
2011		4,512	16,383
2013			30,000
2017	1,000		43,000
2019			52,000

The American Heritage Girls was founded in 1995 by Patti Garibay and other parents from West Chester, Ohio to form a Christian alternative to the Girl Scouts of the USA after the Girl Scouts allowed individual Scouts and Scouters to use wording appropriate to their own beliefs for the word "God" in the promise and supposedly banned prayer at meetings. The organization started with 100 girls.

In June 2009, the AHG formed a partnership with the Boy Scouts of America (BSA). The Memorandum of Mutual Support recognized the common values and goals of both organizations and formally established a relationship, as AHG had been working with the BSA on projects and utilized BSA camps especially with the BSA mixed-sex Venturing membership division.

In May 2013, the AHG dissolved its relationship with the BSA in reaction to the BSA's new policy on gay youth, which removed the restriction denying membership to youth on the basis of sexual orientation. Also that month, American Heritage Girls joined the Faith Based Boys Coalition. The Faith Based Boys joined with other groups to form an alternative Boy Scout program. A leadership meeting was held in Louisville, Kentucky on June 29, 2013, to discuss forming a new boys group. The AHG cofounder Patti Garibay was invited to the Kentucky meeting as an advisor. It was revealed in September that American Heritage Girls would be partnering with Trail Life USA, a boys' Scout-like group which was modeled on AHG.

== Program ==
The American Heritage Girls program is divided into several levels based primarily on age. Girls participate in troop activities and work toward earning 80 badges, learn leadership skills, social and spiritual development:

- Pathfinder— 5–6 years old: The Pathfinder Level is intended to give a girl a chance to try out the AHG Program and learn more about it. A Pathfinder girl earns necklace beads for attendance, participation and Bible verse memorization while learning the four parts of the AHG Oath. She may earn the Fanny Crosby Award upon completion of this Level.
- Tenderheart— 6–9 years old: A Tenderheart earns Badges and Sports Pins in any of the six Frontiers of Skill and receives activity patches for participating in Troop activities or special events. She may earn the Sacagawea Award for achieving the highest level of skill and service at this Level. Blue Service Stars are awarded for every five hours of community service.
- Explorer— 9–12 years old: An Explorer earns Badges and Sports Pins in any of the six Frontiers of Skill and receives activity patches for participating in Troop activities or special events. She may earn the Ida Scudder (previously Lewis and Clark) Award for achieving the highest level of skill and service at this Level. Red Service Stars are awarded for every 10 hours of community service. Explorers are allowed to participate in overnight camping events
- Pioneer— 12–14 years old: A Pioneer continues to earn Badges, Sports Pins, Service Stars and activity patches. She may earn the Harriet Tubman Award for achieving the highest level of skill and service at this Level. Silver Service Stars are awarded for every 15 hours of community service. A Pioneer is also eligible for the roles of Camp or Event Aide. The Pioneer Level is where girls really begin to show leadership skills by assisting their leaders with planning, organizing and staffing special events for AHG in the community or within their Troop.
- Patriot— 14–18 years old: Patriot is the highest Program Level in AHG. A Patriot still earns Badges, Sports Pins, Service Stars and activity patches. She may earn the Abigail Adams Award (previously the Dolly Madison award) for achieving the highest level of skill and service at this Level. Gold Service Stars are awarded for every 20 hours of community service. Patriot girls plan and carry out activities with Unit Leaders who function as “facilitators”, allowing girls to make decisions on a regular basis.

Girls proceed through various ranks as they get older, each year girls moving to an older unit will bridge over to the new unit. Members can earn a religious award, such as the PRAY award or the REAL religious award. Troops must do 3 community service projects per year. The first award girls earn after joining AHG is their joining award, which gives them the opportunity to learn about flag etiquette, AHG history, the buddy system, and uniforms.

Pathfinder's uniforms consist of a pathfinder shirt, pathfinder necklace, closed toe shoes, and navy slacks or a skirt. Tenderhearts wear white polos, closed toe shoes, a navy neckerchief, a red vest, and navy shorts or a skirt. Explorer uniforms are a white polo, closed toe shoes, a red neckerchief, a navy vest, and khaki slacks or a skirt. Pioneers wear a white polo, a navy sash, closed toe shoes, and a khaki/navy/or black skirt or slacks. Patriots wear the same uniform as Pioneers, except for a red polo.

The American Heritage Girl program emphasizes life skill enhancement, developing teamwork & building confidence, social development, girl leadership, character development, and spiritual development. AHG ascribes to progressive programing, where everything a girl does will be appropriate for her age and ability. As a girl moves through the program, requirements for badges and other achievements will become more challenging.

American Heritage Girls have the opportunity to earn badges from 6 frontiers:

- Heritage Frontier - includes badges such as Citizenship and Government, Native American, and Caring For My Environment
- Family Living Frontier - includes badges such as Cooking, Home Care & Repair, Auto Care and Safety, and Money Management
- Arts Frontier - includes badges such as Cinematography, Creative Writing, Music Performance, and Theater
- Outdoor Skills Frontier - includes badges such as Archery, Canoeing, Cycling, Fishing, Golf, Horsemanship, and Snow Skiing & Snowboarding
- Personal Well-Being Frontier - includes badges such as Book Adventurer, Emergency Preparedness, Physical Fitness, Sign Language, and Travel
- Science and Technology Frontier - includes badges such as Aviation, Geology, Internet Adventure, Space Exploration, and Zoology

Pathfinders earn necklace beads for attendance, memorizing verses, and participation instead of badges.

In addition to badges, girls are encouraged to earn level awards, sports pins, service stars, and patches. In the last year a girl is in each level (3rd grade, 6th grade, 8th grade, etc.), they have the opportunity to work towards a level award. Pathfinders earn the Fanny Crosby Award, Tenderhearts earn the Sacagawea Award, Explorers earn the Ida Scudder Award (formerly Lewis and Clark), Pioneers earn the Harriet Tubman Award, and Patriots earn the Dolly Madison award. Level awards typically include earning one badge from each frontier, earning a service star every year, attending and planning special events, and a board of review.

Sports pins include sports such as bowling, gymnastics, martial arts, skating, tennis, and volleyball. Service stars award girls for serving in their community. Tenderhearts earn blue stars for every five hours of service, Explorers earn red service stars for every ten hours of service, Pioneers earn silver service stars for every 15 hours of service, and Patriots earn gold service stars for every 20 hours of service. AHG awards patches for troop activities, such as mother/daughter event, clean up day, pen pal, summer fun, fundraising top seller, respect life, food drive, father/daughter events, and camping patches.

As a Patriot, they are given the chance to work toward earning the Stars and Stripes Award, the highest honor achievable in the program. It requires earning a minimum of 16 badges, earning the Abigail Adams Level Award (formerly Dolly Madison), performing a service project with a minimum of 100 hours of service that demonstrates leadership, leadership development, writing a life ambition/spiritual walk essay, earning a religious recognition, completing a mini-resume, and asking for and receiving reference letters. Girls must have earned the Abigail Adams Award, which you can earn at 15, and be more than 6 months away from 18 before completing the requirements and completing a board of review.

== See also ==
- Religious emblems programs
- Trail Life USA
