= Trail Life USA =

American Christian Scout-like organization for boys

- Headquarters: Belton, South Carolina
- Country: United States
- Founded: June 2013
- Chief Executive Officer: Mark Hancock
- Affiliation: Christian
- Website traillifeusa.com

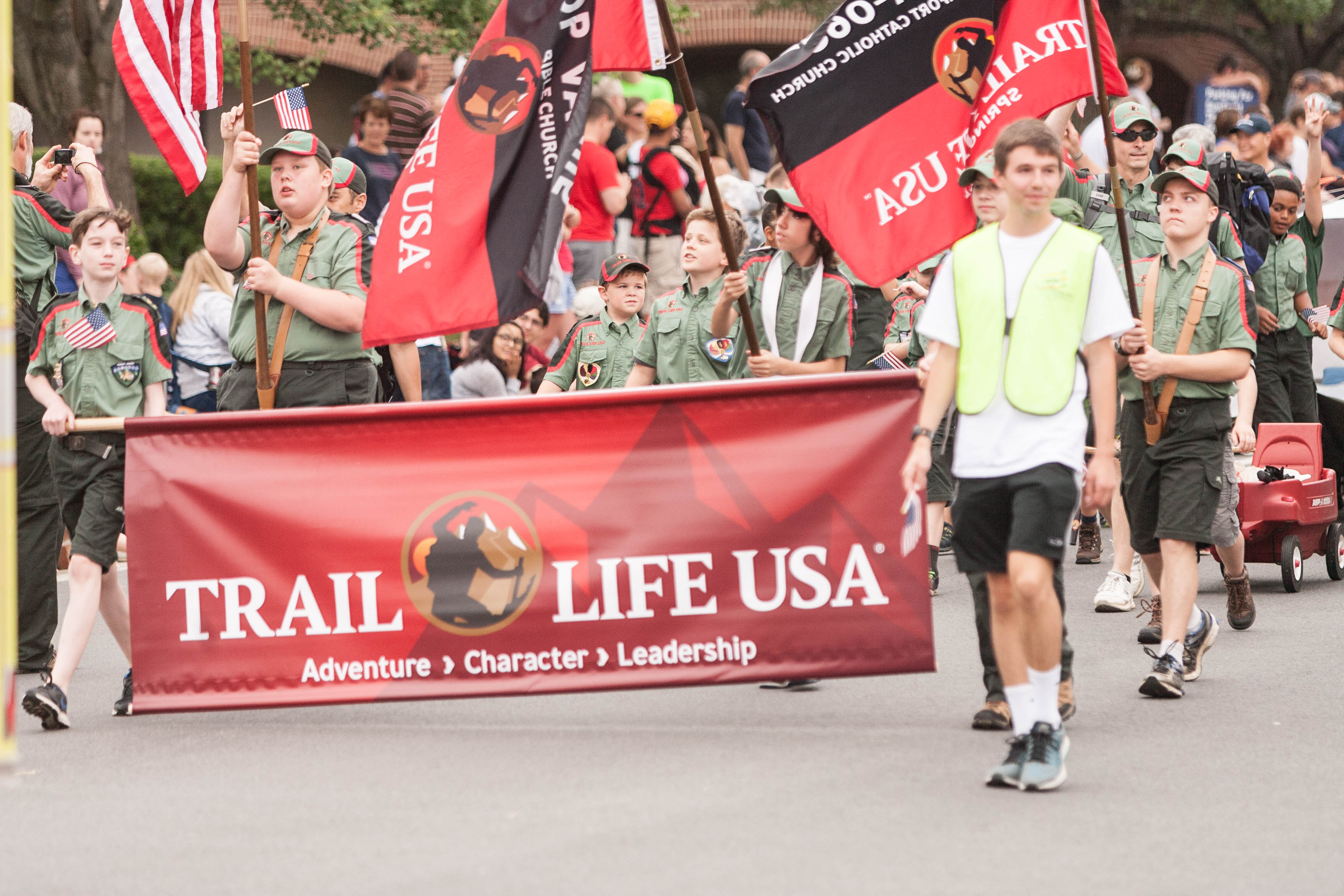
Trail Life USA members at 4th of July parade in Fairfax, Virginia

Trail Life USA (TLUSA or commonly Trail Life) is a faith-based Scout-like organization providing youth mentorship and character development to boys in the United States. The organization was founded in 2013 in reaction against the Boy Scouts of America (BSA) changing its membership policy to allow gay youth, adults, and scoutmasters in boy scout Troops. As of late 2026, Trail Life has grown to over 70,000 members. All charters of Trail Life USA must pledge to follow its "Statement of Faith"; the organization is Trinitarian Christian. Youth of all or no religious backgrounds are allowed to join, but individual Charter Organizations may limit Troop membership to boys of a certain faith or membership in a certain organization.

== Background ==
In May 2013, Boy Scouts of America (BSA) voted to change its membership policy to allow youth of any sexual orientation. Following the vote, John Stemberger changed the mission of OnMyHonor.net to start a new alternative Scouting program to be the premier national character development organization for young men which "produces godly and responsible husbands, fathers, and citizens". OnMyHonor.net was a group formed by John Stemberger to oppose the proposed membership policy change in March 2013 and consisted of parents, Scoutmasters, Eagle Scouts and other Scouting leaders.

Following the vote, the Faith-Based Boys (FBB) was founded. In May 2013, American Heritage Girls (AHG) joined the FBB. FBB official Thomas Dillingham indicated that the group would start accepting applications in August for youth memberships and group leaders.

OnMyHonor.net, Faith Based Boys and other regional and national groups, TrailHead USA and Frontier Service Corps, joined to form the new group. A leadership meeting was held in Louisville, Kentucky on June 29, 2013, to discuss forming a new group. The AHG cofounder Patti Garibay was invited to the Kentucky meeting as an advisor. The organization would be based on the AHG program.

In a July 2013 interview, Stemberger said, "If a young man has a same-sex attraction he would not be turned away in the program, but he's not going to be allowed to kind of openly flaunt it and carry a rainbow flag", and stated, "we're going to focus on sexual purity, not sexual orientation". They will have a policy that "the proper context for sexual relations is only between a man and a woman in the covenant of marriage."

== History ==
Trail Life motto/slogan

Walk Worthy (from Colossians 1:10)

— NPR

Trail Life USA was formed in July 2013. On September 6–7, 2013, a national convention was held for the new group where chartering rules, programs, rankings, and uniforms were adopted and its name revealed. Over 300 names were considered for the new organization. The group selected Trail Life USA as its name and chose to start in January 2014 with an expected 1000 incubation troops formed by then. It was also revealed in September that Trail Life would be partnering with American Heritage Girls. During the national convention announcing Trail Life USA, Stemberger told the audience "Real men value truth over tradition," and "Real men value principle over program, and they value integrity over institutions."

In October 2013, Lutheran Church–Missouri Synod leaders indicated that member churches may affiliate with any Scouting program including Trail Life.

Year	Units	Members
2015	524	20,000
2017	727	23,390
2020	841	31,078
2021	875	37,350
2023	1,000	49,000
2024	1,250	60,000
2026	1,500	70,000

Richard Mathews, BSA's former general counsel, joined Trail Life USA as its acting general counsel.

Trail Life USA reported that almost 500 troops were pre-chartered by the January 1, 2014, official launch date. After its first full year of operation, Trail Life USA had 524 officially chartered troops in 48 states and just under 20,000 members.

Trail Life USA's headquarters (known as the "Home Office") is located on a 127-acre dedicated camping facility known as Camp Aiken, south of Greenville, South Carolina. The property features a full gymnasium, chapel, trails, fishing ponds, bonfire areas, and numerous campsites.

== Program ==
The Trailman Oath

"On my honor I will do my best to serve God and my country, to respect authority, to be a good steward of creation, and to treat others as I want to be treated."

— The Trailman's Handbook, page xiv

Trailmen fall into various categories based on the grade they are in corresponding to their age:

- Woodlands Trail, grades K–5 (elementary school)
- Navigators, grades 6–8 (middle school)
- Adventurers, grades 9–12 (high school)
- Guidons, age 18 through 25 years

The Trail Life salute is based on the Military salute while its sign is a five-finger sign similar to the three-finger Scout sign.

== Freedom Award ==
Trail Life USA's highest award is the Freedom Award for which the potential recipients must choose a "major" and two "minor" subjects and lead the development and implementation of a community-oriented Servant Leadership Project. The award is characterized by Biblical symbolism from the Old and New Testaments of the Christian Bible, primarily John 8:36 referring to a Christian's Freedom.

The award is achieved when the Trailman has completed all necessary levels of Trail Life. The Trailman, to show that he has received the Freedom Award, is given a Freedom Topper. This is a marker that screws onto the top of the Trailman's staff.

== Potential Department of War Support ==
In a video released by the U.S. Department of War (DoW) in early 2026, Secretary Pete Hegseth stated the Department "may eventually support" "groups like Trail Life USA." The statement followed much criticism from Hegseth and the DoW regarding current policies of Scouting America (formerly Boy Scouts of America), the current federally-supported scouting organization in the United States. While no final decision has been made yet, the department plans to "watch closely" and evaluate whether a partnership between Trail Life and the DoW aligns with federal youth development goals and policies set forth by the Trump Administration.
