= History of Scouting America =

- Current logo of Scouting America
- Founded: 1910

Scouting America (formerly the Boy Scouts of America [BSA]) was inspired by and modeled on The Boy Scouts Association, established by Robert Baden-Powell in Britain in 1908. In the early 1900s, several youth organizations were active, and many became part of Scouting America (see Scouting in the United States).

Scouting America was founded as the Boy Scouts of America (BSA) in 1910 at the "first encampment" in Silver Bay, NY, and grew rapidly and became the largest youth organization in the United States. Early issues involved race, the "younger boy problem," and the "older boy problem." Troops initially followed local community policy on race. For younger boys, the Cubbing program arose, and for older boys, Rovering and Exploring programs were developed. Additional programs and changes have occurred over the years to adapt the program to the youth of the day.

== W. D. Boyce and the Unknown Scout ==
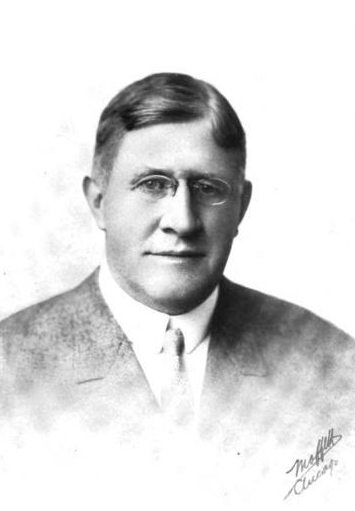
W. D. Boyce in 1912

W. D. Boyce was an American newspaper man and entrepreneur. According to legend, he was lost on a foggy street in London when an unknown Scout came to his aid, guiding him back to his destination. The boy then refused Boyce's tip, explaining that he was merely doing his duty as a Boy Scout. It is said that immediately afterward, Boyce met with General Robert Baden-Powell, who was the head of the Boy Scout Association at that time. Boyce returned to America, and, four months later, founded the Boy Scouts of America. This version of the legend has been printed in numerous BSA handbooks and magazines. There are several variations of this legend, such as one that claims he knew about Scouting ahead of time.

In reality, Boyce stopped in London en route to a safari in British East Africa. It is true that an unknown Scout helped him and refused a tip. But this Scout only helped him cross a street to a hotel, did not take him to the Scout headquarters, and Boyce never met Baden-Powell. Upon Boyce's request, the unknown Scout did indeed give him the address of the Scout headquarters, where Boyce went on his own and picked up information about the group. Weather reports show that London had no fog that day. Boyce returned to London after his safari and visited the Scout headquarters again and gained the use of Scouting for Boys in the development of a US Scouting program. This and other elements of the legend were promoted by James E. West in 1915 to help build up Boyce as the true founder of the BSA in order to defuse an escalating conflict between Daniel Carter Beard and Ernest Thompson Seton over who should be considered the founder of the BSA. Elements of this story, including the fog, may have been borrowed from a story concerning the Rhode Island Boy Scouts.

== Scouting comes to the United States ==
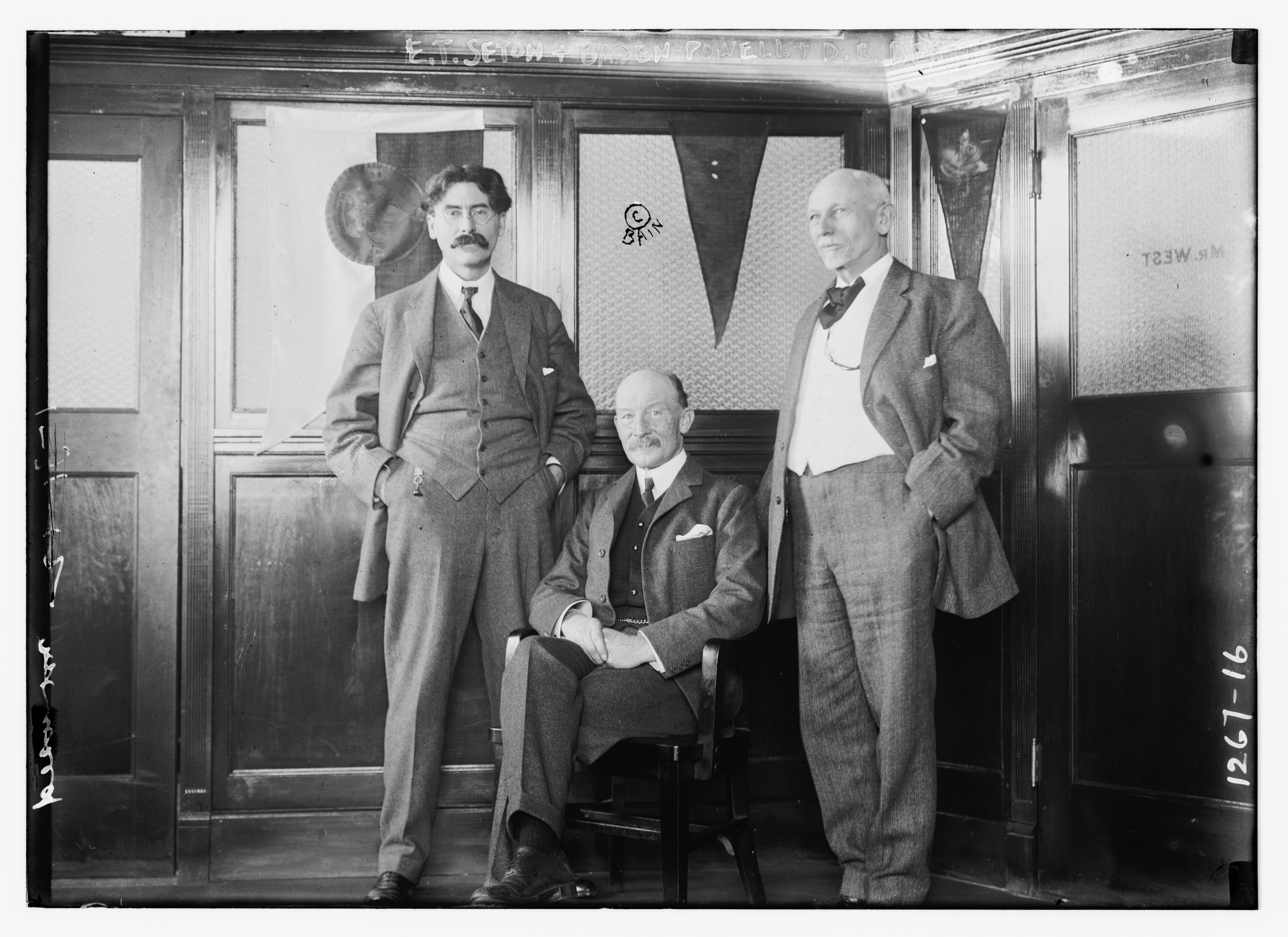
Seton, Baden-Powell, and Beard in West's office - unknown date

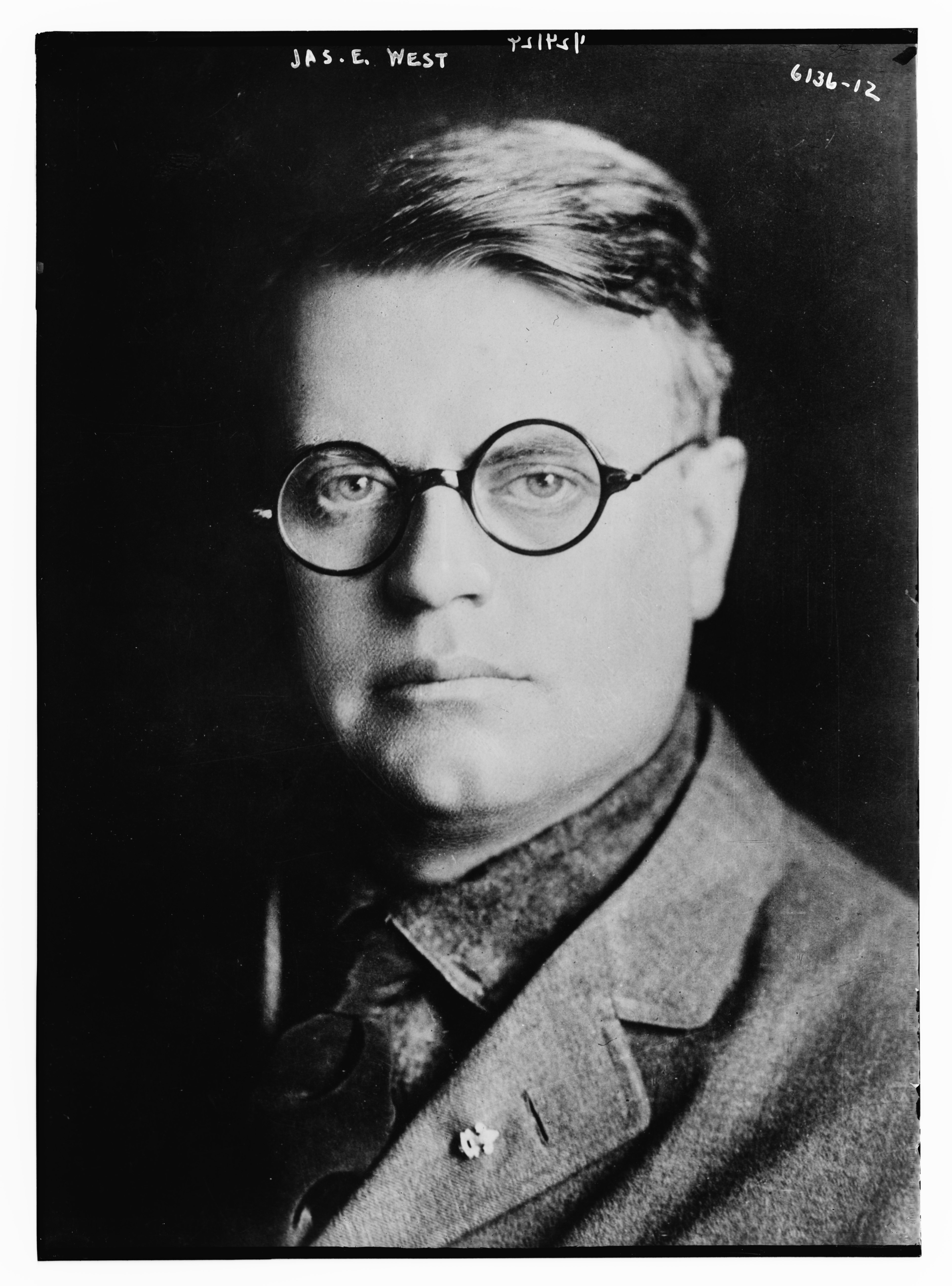
James E. West circa 1918

Boyce returned to the United States and with Edward S. Stewart and Stanley D. Willis. He incorporated the Boy Scouts of America on February 8, 1910, and applied for a congressional charter. The bill was tied up with a charter for the Rockefeller Foundation and Boyce withdrew it after many delays. Around this time, William Randolph Hearst, a rival newspaperman, formed the American Boy Scouts (ABS), a group that lasted through 1918. Between business and travel, Boyce did not spend much time on the new organization. Edgar M. Robinson, a senior administrator of the YMCA in New York City, learned of the new Boy Scout program and traveled to Chicago where he agreed to help Boyce organize the Boy Scouts as a national organization. Boyce pledged $1000 a month for a year to support the program– but reports indicate only three or four payments were actually made. Robinson returned to New York to begin the search for members. After a series of meetings in early 1910, the Woodcraft Indians led by Ernest Thompson Seton, the Boy Scouts of the United States headed by Colonel Peter Bomus and the National Scouts of America headed by Colonel William Verbeck were absorbed into the BSA. The National Highway Patrol Association Scouts headed by Colonel E. S. Cornell and the Boy Pioneers (formerly known as the Sons of Daniel Boone) headed by Daniel Carter Beard were folded. The BSA National Office opened in the 28th Street YMCA in New York City on June 1, 1910. The first managing secretary (the precursor to the Chief Scout Executive) was John Alexander, a YMCA administrator from Philadelphia, Pennsylvania. By autumn BSA had 2,500 leader applications from 44 states and 150,900 youth inquiries.

The National Council was formed in the fall of 1910 with Colin H. Livingstone as the national president, Robinson becoming the managing secretary (on a temporary leave from the YMCA) and Seton as Chief Scout. Beard, Bomus and Verbeck became the National Commissioners. Robinson wanted to return to his full-time position at the YMCA, so Livingstone put out inquiries for a replacement.

James E. West was a federal government lawyer known as a leading advocate of children's rights. In 1910, with the endorsement of President Roosevelt, West was hired on a six-month temporary basis by Boy Scouts of America starting on January 1, 1911. This employment would end up lasting 35 years.

== 1910s ==
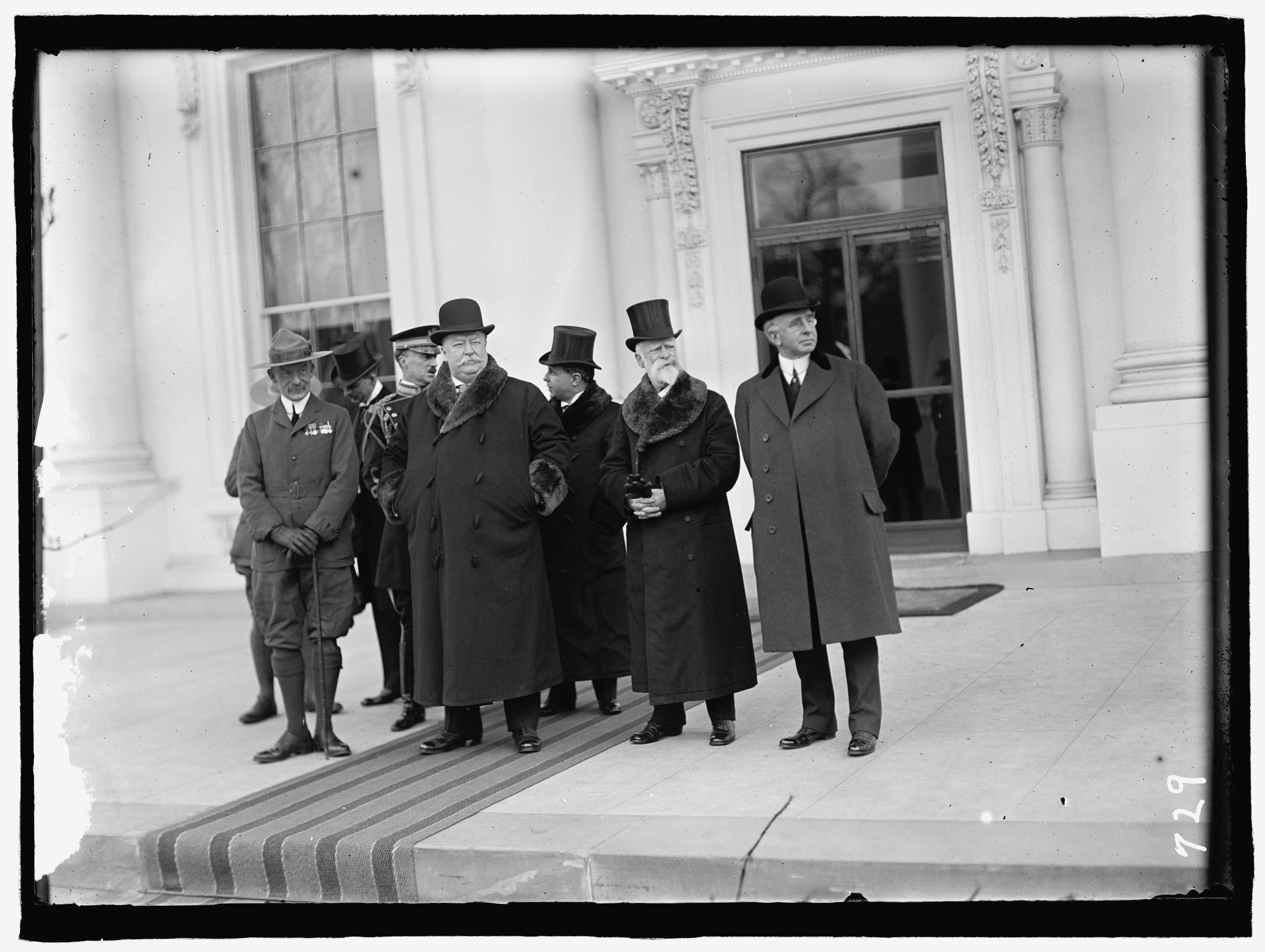
Left to right: Sir Baden-Powell, President Taft, British Ambassador to the United States James Bryce (British Ambassador) and Colin H. Livingstone at the White House in Washington, DC in 1911

The new BSA office at 200 Fifth Avenue opened in January 1911, with West at the helm and the movement began to grow at a rapid pace. One of West's first tasks was to revise the British-based program outline in Seton's handbook and adapt it for American boys. West was instrumental in expanding the third part of the Scout Oath:

To help other people at all times; to keep myself physically strong, mentally awake and morally straight.

He also pushed to add three parts to the Scout Law: brave, clean, and reverent. He then pressed article III of the constitution of the BSA, now known as the religious principle:

Boy Scouts of America believes that no member can grow into the best kind of citizen without recognizing an obligation to God.

=== Emblem ===
Original Boy Scouts of America emblem

The fleur-de-lis was used early on by Lord Baden-Powell in the Scouting movement. This symbol was criticized by some early on, as Baden-Powell explained in 1933. He explained that some had accused scouting to be a military movement and as proof that the fleur-de-lis was nothing more than a spear-head, the emblem of battle. He defended the movement by stating that, while Scouts support the military, Scouting is not soldiering. In Lessons From The Varsity Of Life, he stated that "The crest is the fleur-de-lys, a lily, the emblem of peace and purity." He further explained that he "chose the Fleur-de-Lys, which marks the North point on the compass, as the Scout is the man who can show the way like a compass needle." It was used to remind the scouts of the three promises he made: Duty to Others, Duty to God and Duty to Self. This international symbol of scouting was embraced by the American Leaders. An eagle and the shield were superimposed to represent American Scouting.

=== Organization ===
As the BSA grew, the concept of the local council grew as a method of administration. With the local council came the beginning of the Commissioner Service. Local commissioners formed the first councils and started the tradition of direct support to the Scoutmaster. A first-class council had a paid commissioner, and could keep 15 cents of each 25-cent registration, while second-class councils with volunteer commissioners could keep five cents.

The first Annual Meeting took place on February 14 and 15, 1911 in Washington, DC. The council arrived at Union Station by a patrol of boy scouts. The meeting took place mostly at the New Willard Hotel. On the afternoon of February 14, the delegation walked to the White House to meet President Taft, the honorary president of the BSA who "addressed the council, expressed his interest in the movement, and his approval of its purposes to develop the American youth into potential defenders of the Nation. Were also in attendance, Sir Baden-Powell and British Ambassador James Bryce. According to Mr. West, the Boy Scouts of America had approximately 300,000 members at that point.

=== Handbook ===
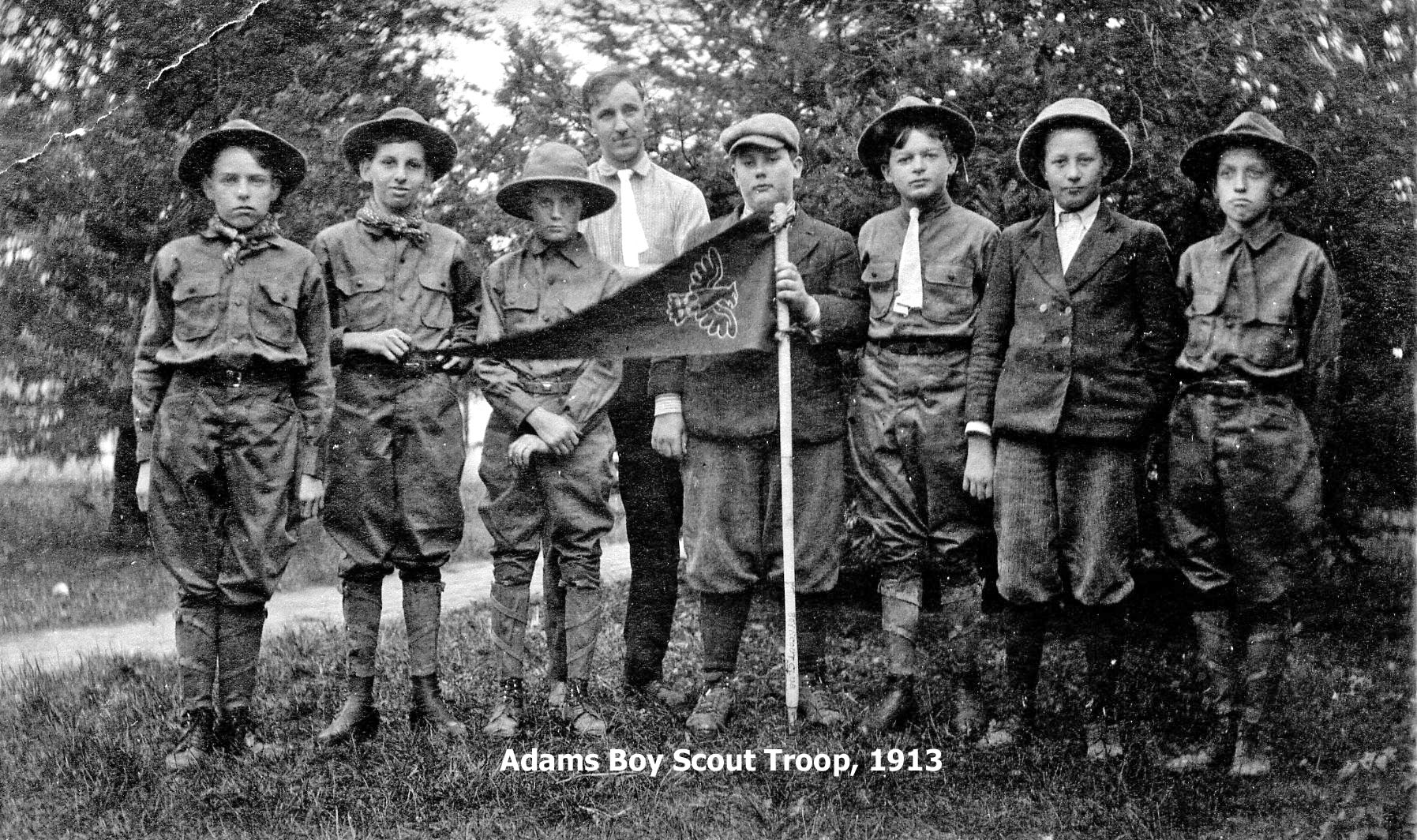
Adams, Nebraska Boy Scout troop 1913

Seton wrote A Handbook of Woodcraft, Scouting, and Life-craft (now known as the 1910 Original Edition Handbook) which was the first version of the current Boy Scout Handbook. It borrowed heavily from Lord Baden-Powell's Scouting for Boys who in turn was based heavily on Seton's handbook The Birch Bark Roll for his youth group The Woodcraft Indians. Published from July 1910 to March 1911, it covered the Scouting organization and camping skills but did not talk of first aid, knife and axe safe use or how to use a compass and map. The new edition of the handbook renamed The Official Handbook for Boys was published in June 1911 and covered similar topics.

The original handbook a lot of material from Baden-Powell's Scouting for Boys. The Scout Law in this original source included that boys needed to be loyal to "his employers" and this was repeated in some early editions of the BSA material. Some union leaders understood this as BSA opposing the right to strike and the right to Collective bargaining. This loyalty was removed from the 1911 edition, but it took several years for some labor organizations to allow their members' sons to join Boy Scouts of America.

West was elevated in prestige through a change in his title when in November 1911 he became the Chief Scout Executive. He and his staff created requirements that became fundamental to the structure of the organization, including the requirement that troop charters be issued to a community organization or established group of citizens (first known as the sponsoring institution and now known as a chartered organization), and that each Scoutmaster would be under the supervision of a troop committee.

In February 1912, Baden-Powell returned to the United States and West accompanied him on tour. Baden-Powell remarked that the BSA needed better communications. After discussions with the executive board, Boyce offered to fund a magazine if it were published by his company in Chicago. Livingstone declined the offer, noting that the board wanted the magazine to be published from the New York office. Boyce withdrew from all administrative duties and returned to newspaper management. West learned of a Scouting magazine called Boys' Life and recommended it for purchase. The first cover by Norman Rockwell, Scout at Ship's Wheel, appeared on the September 1913 issue.

In 1912, Sea Scouting became an official program, based on the British Sea Scout program. Arthur Rose Eldred became the first Eagle Scout in 1912.

=== African-American Exclusion ===
From the beginning Boy Scouts of America was of the position to allow African-Americans into its ranks. Some African-American community leaders in the South created troops even before BSA existed and some African-American boys were accepted in mostly white troops in the North. However, the social attitudes were still rooted in segregation, especially in the South. Some white leaders in the South feared that they would be unable to keep white boys in the troops if segregation was not kept as the parents would oppose it.

When Boyce departed, he turned the Boy Scout corporation over to the members of the executive board with the stipulation that the Boy Scouts would not discriminate on the basis of race or creed. The BSA established the position that African Americans should be included, but that local communities should follow the same policies that they followed in the school systems. Thus, much of the American South as well as many major northern communities had segregated programs with "colored troops" until the late 1940s. Some troops in the South threatened to leave BSA and burn their uniforms if African American Scouts were permitted, but West was key in overcoming those obstacles.

Scouting in the South remained largely segregated until World War II.

=== Church Support ===
From the very beginning, the program was endorsed by most Protestant churches. The adoption was much slower for the Catholic church, though some troops could be found in the very beginning in some parishes. However, there were some fears among some members of the Catholic church that the close ties between the YMCA and the new program could be a problem. An accusation was made in 1912 that Catholics were barred from leadership in the organization. James E. West denied it, pointing to the fact that many Catholics were in positions of leadership, including priests being Scoutmasters, saying, "This organization is not Protestant, nor is it Catholic, nor is it Hebrew, but it is a character-building organization for boys, to be used by all religions and institutions who can see in it a means of helping and assisting the boys of their communities." Finally, in 1917, several archbishops endorsed Scouting.

The Church of Jesus Christ of Latter-day Saints embraced BSA in 1913 when each of their Mutual Improvement Association formed a troop.

=== Pacifism ===
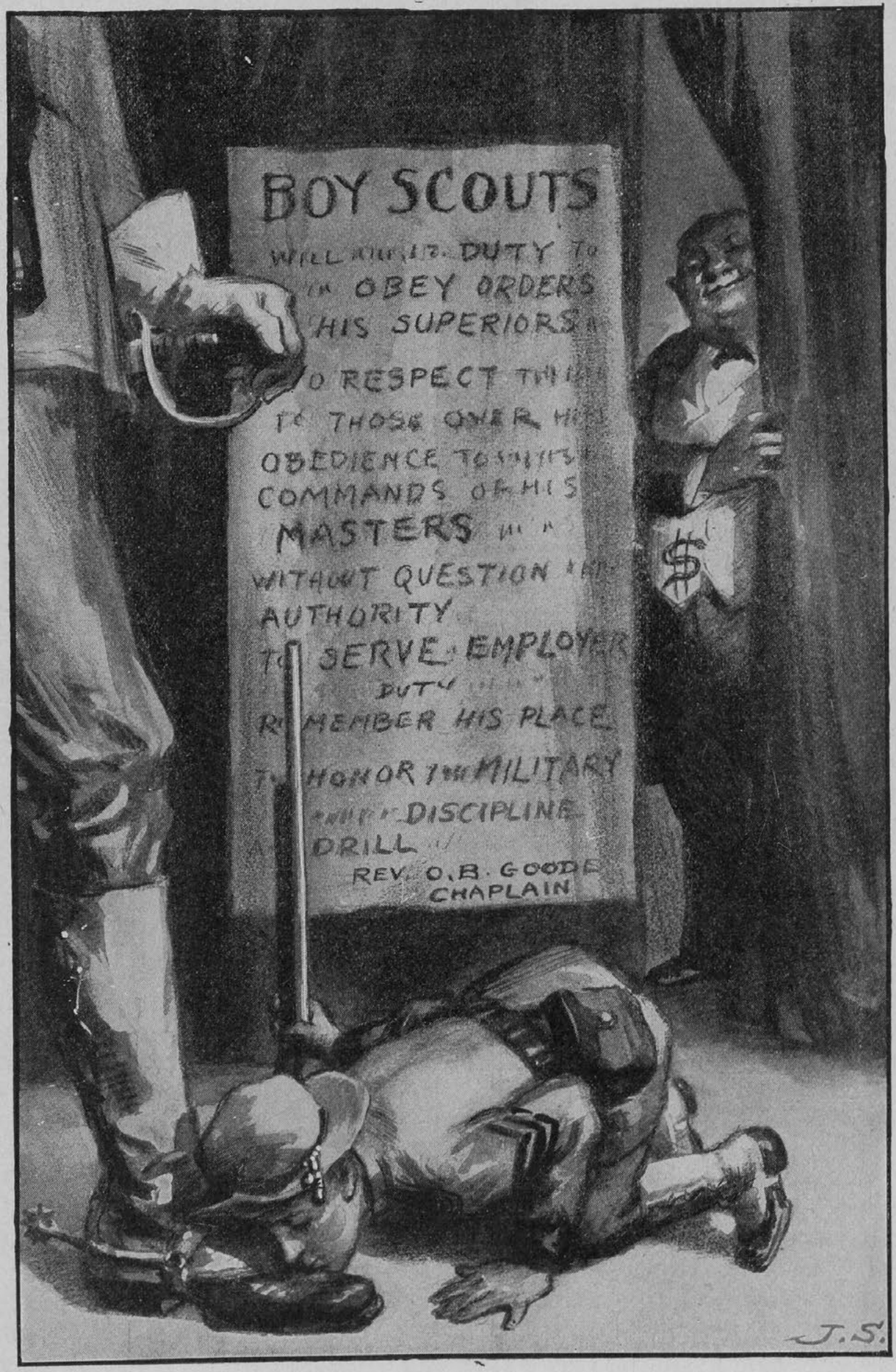
"A Boy Scout—In the Making", a 1911 political cartoon by John Sloan, published in The Masses, criticizing the militaristic nature of the early Boy Scout movement in America

In the years before World War I, pacifism and patriotism often came into conflict, and the BSA was sometimes in the middle. Some thought that the BSA was too militaristic, especially as characterized by their military style uniforms and discipline, while others felt that the BSA was unpatriotic in their stance against military training. In 1912, a member of another organization, the American Boy Scouts, shot another boy with a rifle. West quickly distanced the BSA from the ABS program and any military training or discipline. He refused to allow the BSA Supply group to sell the Remington rifle endorsed by the ABS and de-emphasized the Marksmanship merit badge. The National Rifle Association of America lobbied the executive board to issue the badge. In 1914, Colonel Leonard Wood resigned from the Board after a pacifistic article was published in Boys' Life that he considered to be "almost treasonable". Eventually, the rhetoric calmed down, and the BSA began to issue the Marksmanship merit badge. On the issue of militarism and Scouting, Baden-Powell said he had seen enough of war and that "...the boys should be kept away from the idea that they are being trained so that someday they might fight for their country. It is not war Scouting that is needed now, but peace Scouting." Baden-Powell also thought the BSA was too bureaucratic.

=== Scouting Competition ===
As early as 1910, Beard and Seton had an argument over who was the founder of Scouting. Programs for boys had been advanced by Seton in 1902, Beard in 1905 and Baden-Powell in 1906. Since Baden-Powell had based parts of the program on Seton's work, Seton claimed to be the founder. By 1915, the conflicts between had escalated and in an attempt to defuse the situation, West began promoting the story of the Unknown Scout that emphasized Boyce as the founder of the BSA. Seton still had Canadian citizenship, and this chafed some in the BSA, including West who often referred to him as "our alien friend". The board did not re-elect Seton as Chief Scout in 1915 and he soon stopped publishing in Boys' Life. By early 1916, Seton was officially out of the BSA program, and most of his contributions were removed from the 1916 edition of the handbook. Seton later established the Woodcraft League based on his older works and claimed he had not actually merged them into the BSA.

Boyce had argued for a program to serve boys who could not participate in a troop because of time or location, but West was against any such a program. In 1915, Boyce incorporated the Lone Scouts of America (LSA) and invested all of his new boys as members and himself as the "Chief Totem". The BSA later formed the Pioneer Scouts in 1916 as an outreach to mostly rural areas with only moderate success. In 1924, the LSA merged into the BSA and was run as the Rural Scouting Division for the next decade.

West fiercely defended the use of the term Scout and the right to market Scouting merchandise. When the American Boy Scouts re-emerged as the United States Boy Scouts (USBS), West sued and won. The USBS renamed to the American Cadets but soon folded. The Salvation Army Life-Saving Scouts folded in the 1930s. By 1930, West claimed to have stopped 435 groups from unauthorized use of Scouting as part of an organizational name and as part of commercial products. When the Girl Guides of America started, West discouraged the program. West had earlier worked with Luther Gulick when the Camp Fire Girls were established and always considered them to be the sister program of the BSA. When the Girl Scouts refused to give up their name in 1918, West appealed to Baden-Powell with no results. Lou Henry Hoover became the president of the Girl Scouts in 1922 and First Lady in 1929; West stopped his campaign to rename the Girl Scouts.

With the strict control exerted by West, relations between the BSA and YMCA worsened leading to YMCA sponsored troops lapsing. In 1918 Robinson proposed that the YMCA troops form a branch of the BSA, as the Red Triangle Scouts, which was turned down by West as he would not allow any other structure than that of the national organization and the troops.

=== World War I and Beyond ===
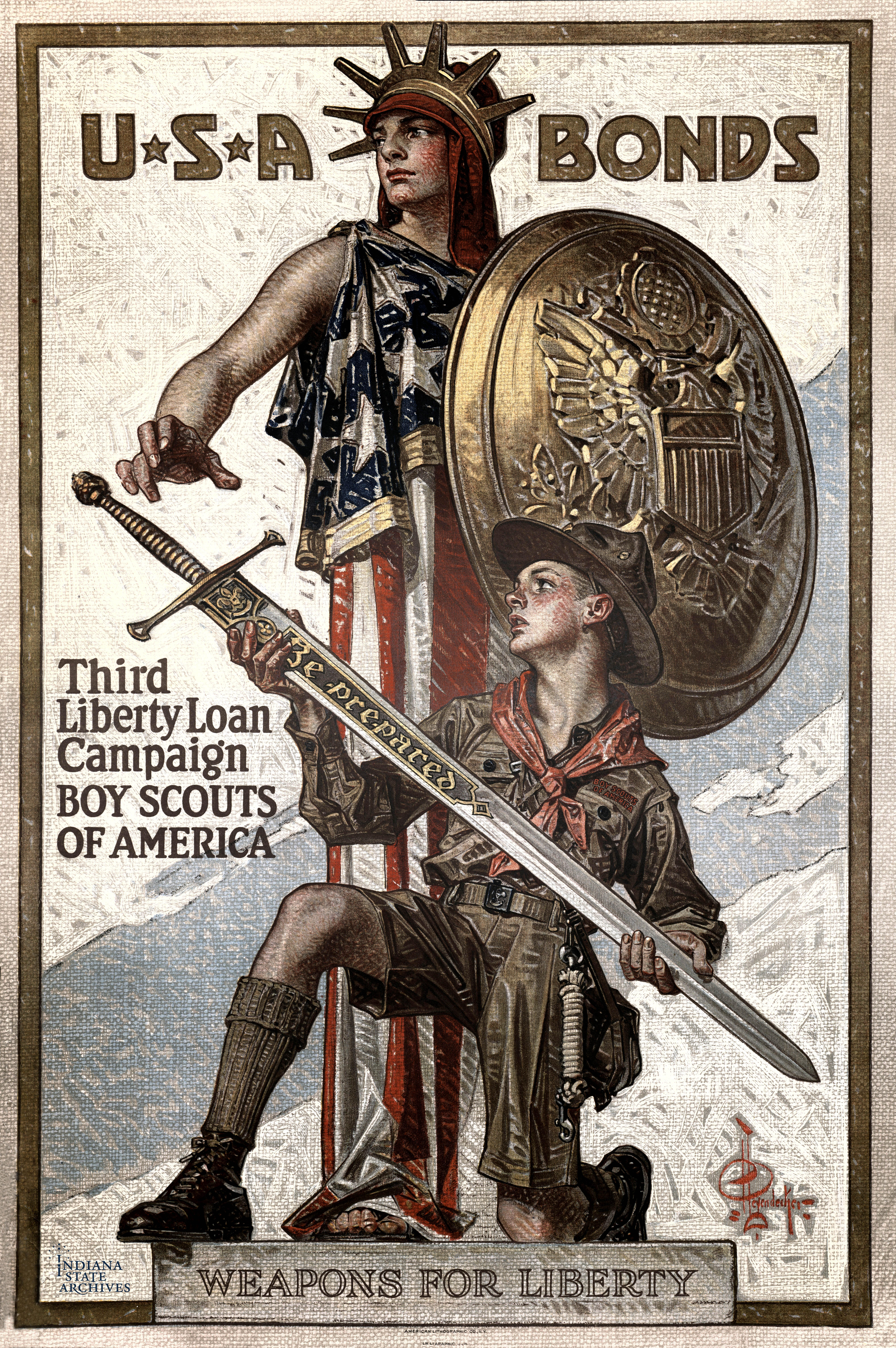
A war bonds poster published by the Boy Scouts of America during World War I

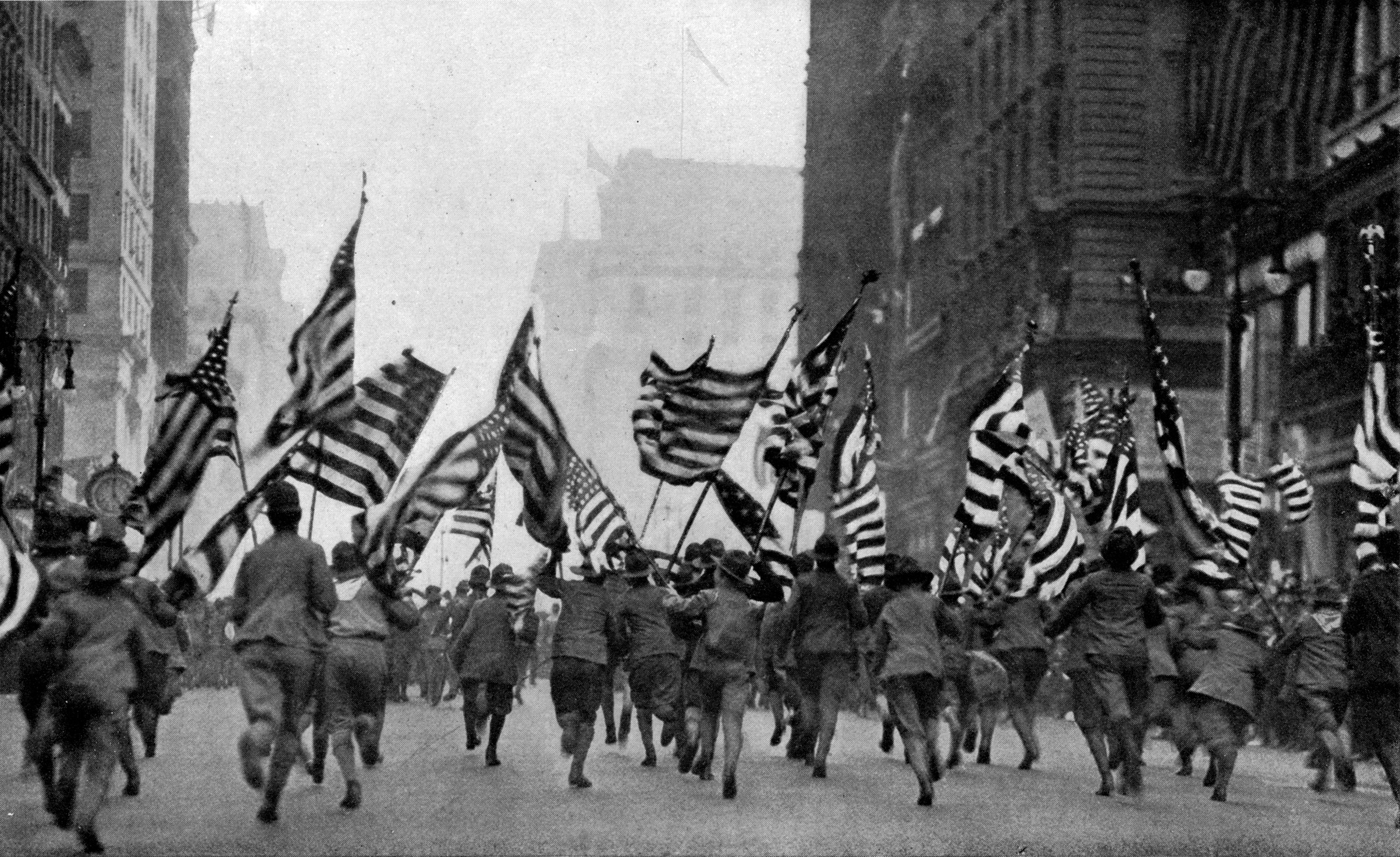
Boy Scouts take to the streets in New York City, 1917

Boy Scouts served as crowd control at the inauguration of President Woodrow Wilson in 1913, and have served at every inauguration since in some ceremonial role. The Philadelphia Area Council started a Summer Camp fraternity called the Order of the Arrow in 1915 that eventually became the Honor Society of the Boy Scouts of America.

Paul Sleman, Colin H. Livingstone, Ernest S. Martin and James E. West successfully lobbied Congress for a congressional charter for the BSA–partly as a way to deal with competition from the Lone Scouts of America, which President Woodrow Wilson signed on June 15, 1916. It reads:

That the purpose of this corporation shall be to promote, through organization and cooperation with other agencies, the ability of boys to do things for themselves and others, to train them in Scoutcraft, and to teach them patriotism, courage, self-reliance, and kindred virtues, using the methods which are now in common use by Boy Scouts.

In addition, the following: Warren Gard (1873–1929) from Hamilton, Ohio, served as a United States Congressman from 1913 to 1921. He was also a lawyer and judge in Hamilton. One of Representative Gard's accomplishments was writing, introducing and securing the passage of H.R.755 which incorporated the Boy Scouts of America and created their national charter. Congress passed the Bill unanimously, and President Wilson sign it into law on June 15, 1916. On November 12, 2016, one hundred years later, an Ohio Historical Marker honoring Warren Gard was placed close to his grave stone in Greenwood Cemetery in Hamilton to honor Gard's accomplishments during his lifetime. His great niece, Kathleen Stuckey Fox, did all the background and leg work to create this marker for her Great Uncle Warren, whom she never had the privilege of knowing personally.

During the war, radio transmitters were regulated, and Scouts were called to look for unauthorized units. Scouts were used as message runners, coast watchers, and were to be alert for men who had not reported for duty. Over $352 million of war bonds were sold by Scouts along with $101 million War Saving Stamps. They collected fruit pits to be processed into charcoal for gas masks and inventoried black walnut trees for use as propellers and gun stocks. The War Garden program was intended for Scouts to raise food at home, but was only moderately successful.

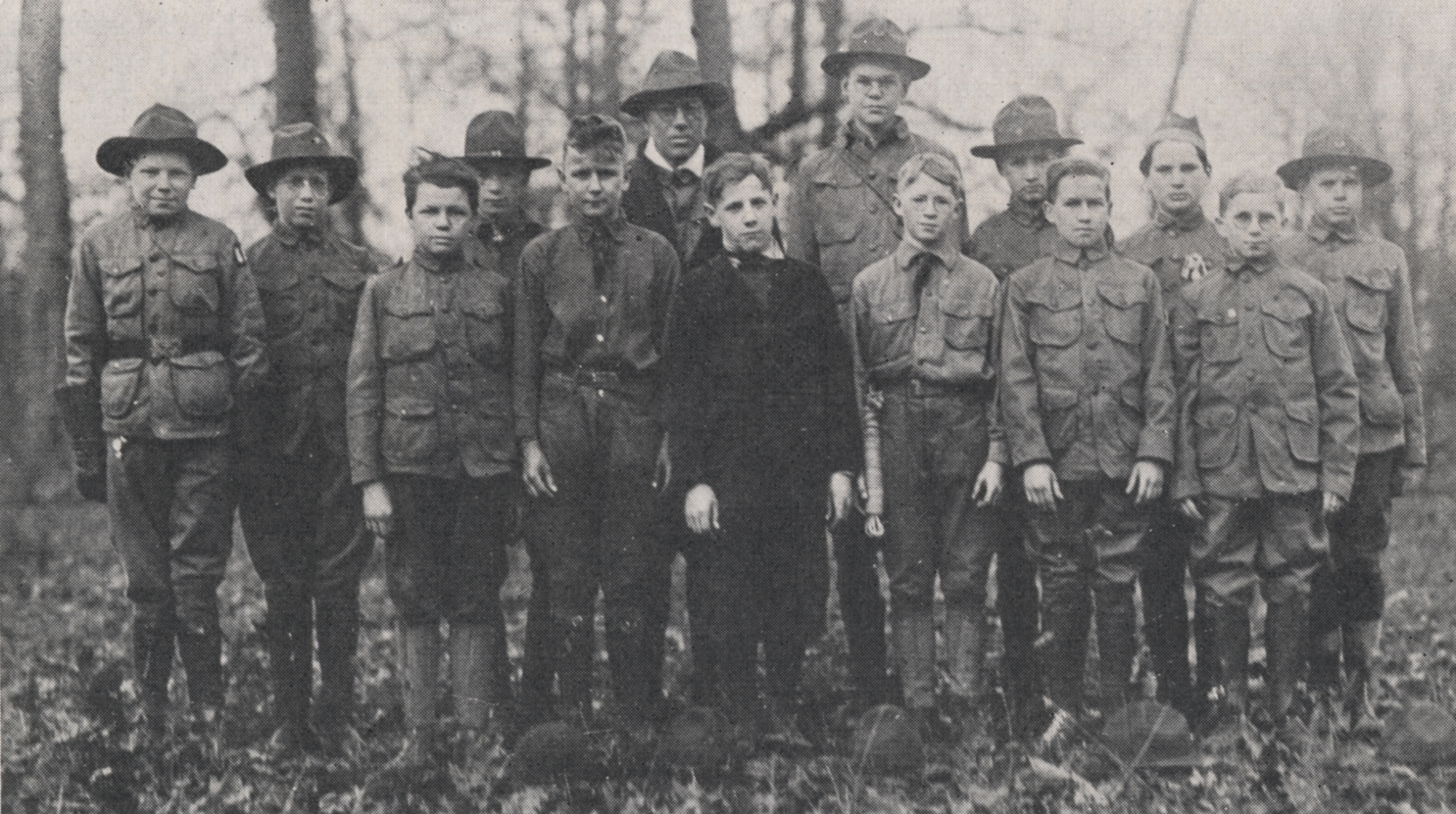
Troop 10 from Columbus, Ohio, 1918

When Baden-Powell returned to the US in 1919, the BSA held a huge rally in Central Park, and later a rally for the return of General John J. Pershing. During the war, it was noted that troops tended to fold if the Scoutmaster was called for service. Changes in the troop structure included limiting the size to 32 Scouts, the introduction of the troop committee and the senior patrol leader position. The Associate Scout, Veteran Scout and Pioneer Scout programs were introduced for Scouts with loose or no troop affiliation. Select paid commissioners in first class councils started to become the first Scout executives and an early professional development program was implemented.

Theodore Roosevelt died on January 16, 1919. Scouts often led by Dan Beard go on pilgrimage at Oyster Bay, Long Island for decades to come.

1910s Boy Scouts of America Membership
	1910	1911	1912	1913	1914	1915	1916	1917	1918	1919
Scout and Scouters Membership	n/a	61,495	98,647	114,882	132,741	262,043	344,290	498,167	599,518	680,088
Net Membership (December 31)	n/a	n/a	n/a	n/a	132,741	182,303	245,073	356,609	420,006	462,781

== 1920s ==
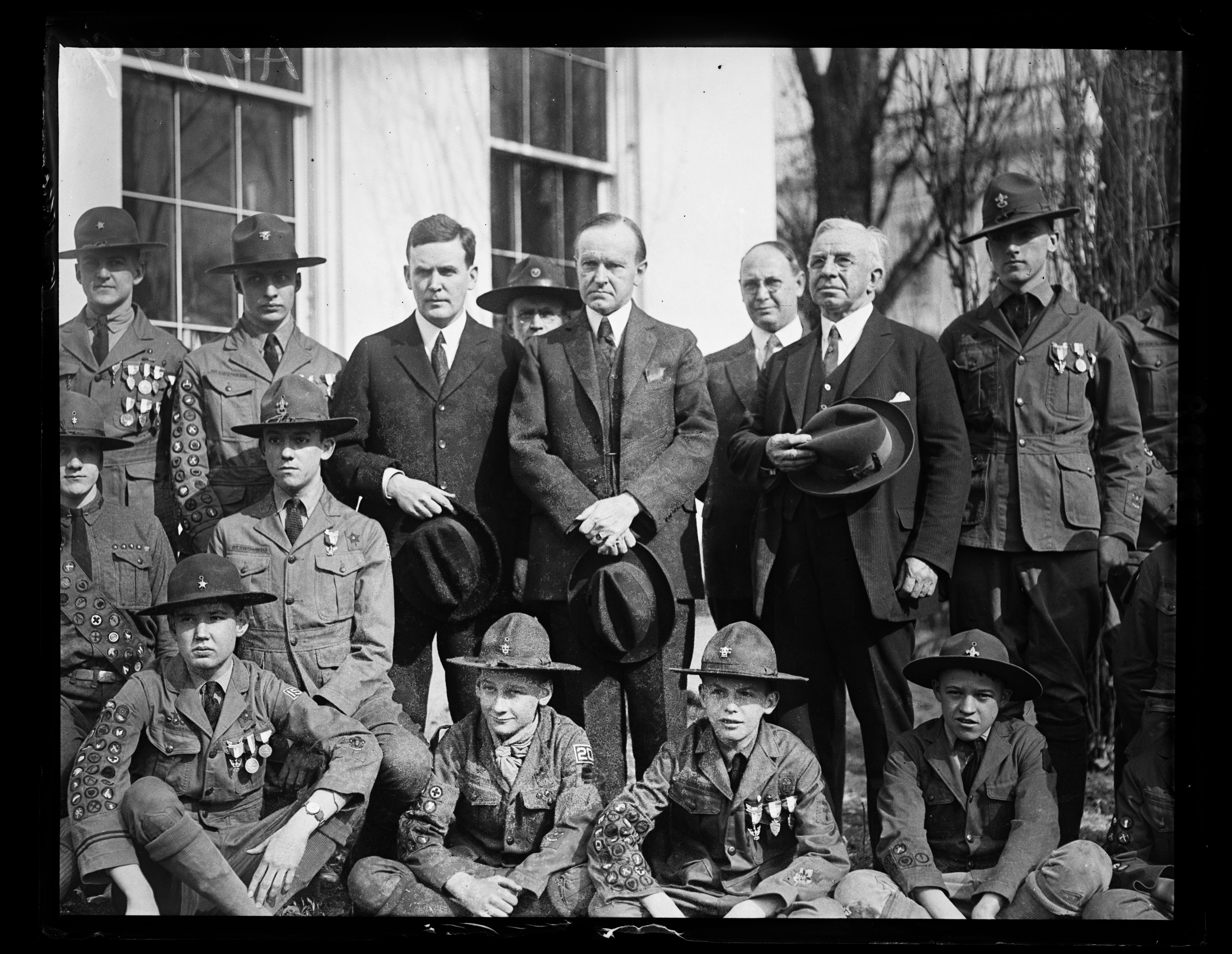
President Coolidge (honorary president of BSA) surrounded by Colin H. Livingstone, BSA Officers and Boy Scouts at the White House on February 15, 1925, for the 15th Anniversary of BSA

The BSA sent a large contingent to the 1920 World Scout Jamboree Baden-Powell presented the Silver Wolf to West and Livingstone. West was persuaded to write the constitution and by-laws for what became the World Organization of the Scout Movement (WOSM). As part of the world movement, the BSA adopted the left handshake and a new uniform: the high collar jacket was replaced by a shirt and neckerchief and shorts were added as an option.

With a high concentration of troops in the New York City area, administration started to become burdensome. In 1921, Franklin Delano Roosevelt was persuaded to head a foundation overseeing the New York borough councils. Dr. George J. Fisher, a YMCA administrator, was recruited as the Deputy Chief Scout Executive. The US was divided 12 regions and then into areas directly reportable to the National Council. Boys' Life was in financial trouble by 1923 and West took over as editor. James J. Storrow replaced Colin Livingstone as president in 1925 and William Hillcourt, later known as "Green Bar Bill" began his association with the BSA. The first program for Scouts with disabilities was introduced in 1923. After Storrow died in 1926, Milton A. McRae became the president briefly, followed by Walter W. Head. The Silver Buffalo Award was created in 1926: the first awards were to Baden-Powell, the Unknown Scout (presented as a statue at Gilwell Park), W. D. Boyce, Livingstone, Storrow (posthumously) Beard, Seton and Robinson. Charles Lindbergh was elected as the 18th Honorary Scout in 1927 and awarded the Silver Buffalo in 1928.

A number of "Industrial Troops" to reach boys already out of school and employed. The Rural Scouting program was expanded with the Railroad Scouting program in 1926. The BSA began expanding the Negro Scouting program: by 1927 thirty-two communities in the south had "colored troops", with twenty-six troops in Louisville, Kentucky. The junior assistant Scoutmaster position was created in 1926 and Eagle Palms were added in 1927. Boys' Life promoted a photo safari to Africa for three Scouts in 1928. The three Scouts, Robert Douglas, David Martin, and Douglas Oliver, wrote the book Three Boy Scouts in Africa upon their return as part of their requirement of being selected for this trip with Martin and Osa Johnson, American photographers known for their African safari movies and photographs. Later in 1928, a trip to the Antarctic with Commander Byrd was promoted and Eagle Scout Paul Siple was selected for the expedition. Hillcourt wrote the first Patrol Leader Handbook, published in 1929. The Silver Wolf was presented to Beard and Mortimer L. Schiff. The first Silver Buffalo Awards were presented in 1926. Membership registration and fees for volunteers began in 1929. By December 31 of that same year, the BSA had a net membership of 842,540.

Starting in the 1920s, Johnson & Johnson started giving out free Band-Aids to BSA troops all over the country. Sales of Band-Aids grew tremendously thanks to this marketing strategy. In 1925, the manufacturer started producing the original first aid kit for Boy Scouts of America. The cardboard box contained a triangular bandage which could be used as a sling, a compress and two safety pins. The following year, silent film star Fred Thomson provided a demonstration of the kit by bandaging the leg of his horse Silver King. Later on the kit was upgraded to a tin box with additional burn and antibiotic creams, first aid instructions and several kinds of bandages (including Brand-Aids). This marketing partnership would continue for decades to come.

1920s Boy Scouts of America Membership
	1920	1921	1922	1923	1924	1925	1926	1927	1928	1929
Scout and Scouters Membership	780,170	630,314	744,009	812,444	925,358	1,006,586	1,073,025	1,169,413	1,183,105	1,181,227
Net Membership (December 31)	503,726	530,203	614,465	661,452	696,420	756,857	811,268	814,481	819,791	842,540

== 1930s ==
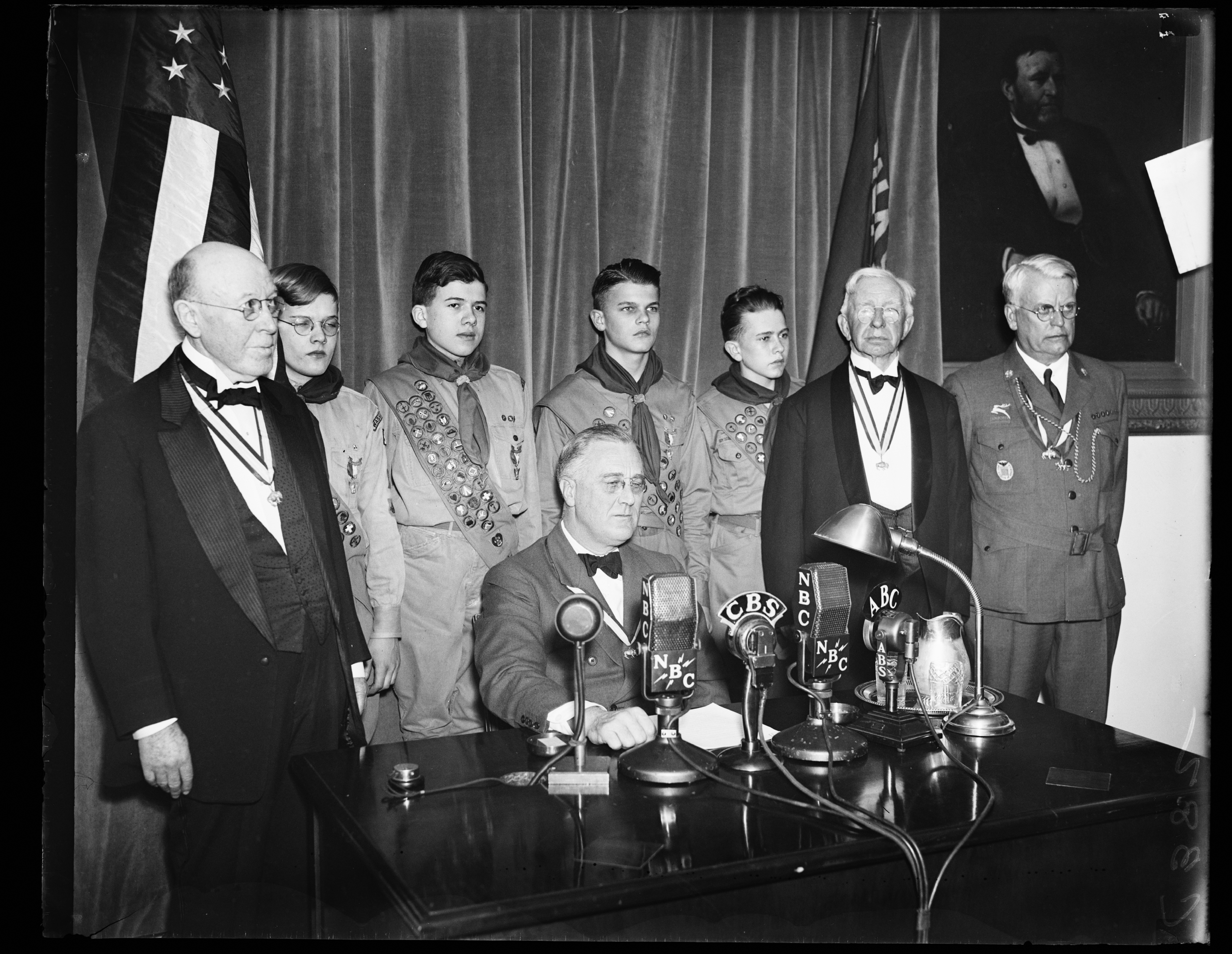
FDR Congratulates Boy Scouts on the 25th Anniversary in 1935

Mortimer Schiff was elected as president in 1931 but died after serving one month and Walter Head returned until 1946. Schiff's mother purchased 400 acres (1.6 km^{2}) of land in New Jersey and donated it to the BSA, thus creating Mortimer L. Schiff Scout Reservation as a national training center. President Roosevelt encouraged Scouts to do their part during the Great Depression. Scouts responded by providing services to assist relief agencies and Scout leaders provided training for the Civilian Conservation Corps. The Senior Scout program within the troop and the Rovering program for older Scouts was introduced in 1933, but was not promoted and was discontinued in 1947.

In 1935, the "Senior Scout" division was created by BSA. This was for boys 15 years and older and focused on advanced camping and worked on advancement leading to the Ranger Award for Sea Scouts, Air Scouts, Explorer Scouts, Rover Scouts and several others. Also, the organization celebrated its silver jubilee.

=== First National Jamboree ===
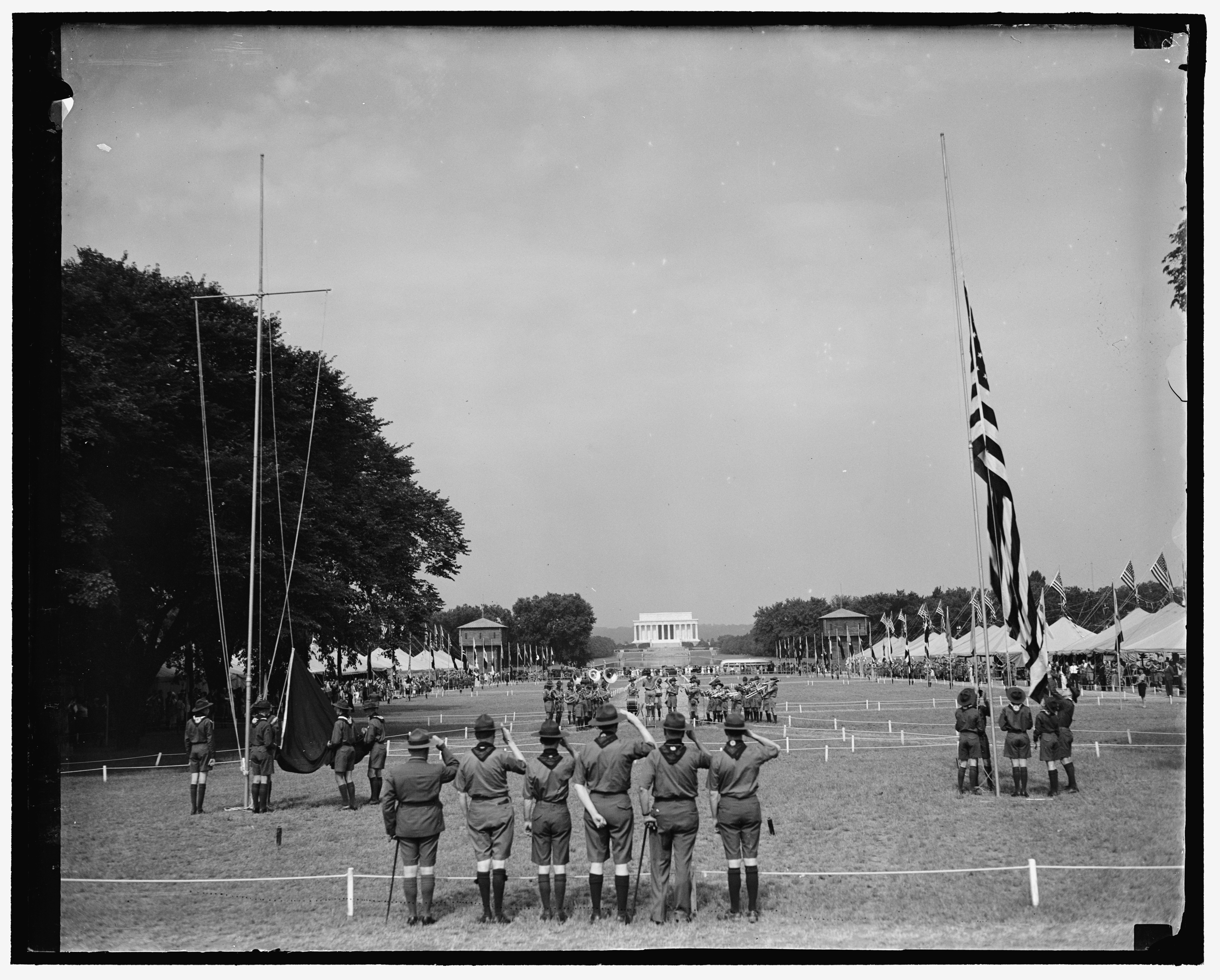
Opening of the first National Scout Jamboree, on the Mall in Washington, D.C., June 30, 1937

The BSA planned to celebrate their 25th anniversary with a jamboree in Washington, D.C., but it was canceled due to an outbreak of polio. It would eventually take place in the summer of 1937 and would set the precedent for other National Jamborees across America. The 1937 National Scout Jamboree was opened by Dan Beard who lit a fire with flint and steel using wood brought by Scouts from all 48 states.

An experimental Wood Badge course was conducted in 1936 along with a Rover Wood Badge Course– both were based on the then current British syllabi. In 1937, oil magnate Waite Phillips donated to the BSA a large tract of land in the Rocky Mountains of New Mexico that became the Philmont Scout Ranch. Scouts participated at the 1939 New York World's Fair. Just under 4,000 Scouts camped on site and served as ushers, guides and honor guards. A rally attracted 630,000 Scouts. The decade ended with a membership of 1,391,831.

=== First Wood Badge Attempt ===
In May and June 1936, a first attempt at the Wood Badge was tried in the United-States. Based on Lord Baden-Powell's UK curriculum, it took place at Schiff Scout Reservation in the form of two courses: the Rover Scout Wood Badge (May 12–20, 1936) and the Scout Wood Badge (May 24-June 3, 1936). The first course went well but the second had issues and it was determined that in the end the Wood Badge would not work in the US. It would return in 1948.

== 1940s ==
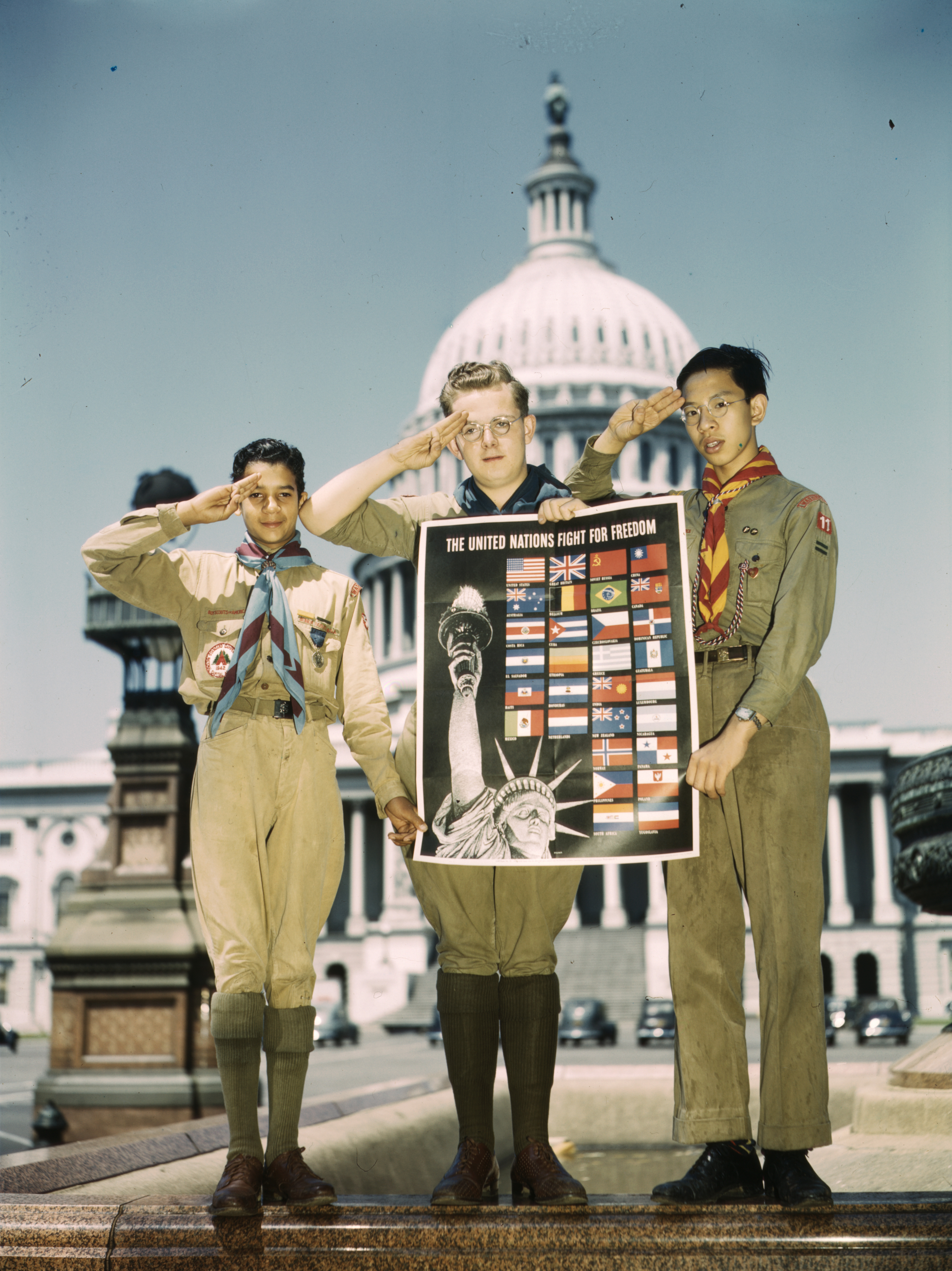
Boy Scouts support the creation of the United Nations, 1941

In 1940, composer Irving Berlin wrote to West expressing a desire to further the aims of Scouting. He created a foundation to distribute the royalties from his song "God Bless America" to the Boy Scouts and Girl Scouts.

=== Japanese American Internment ===
Following the attack on Pearl Harbor on December 7, 1941, 110,000 people of Japanese origins were forced to leave their homes and were segregated in 10 detention camps in seven States: two in California, Arizona, and Arkansas and one in Colorado, Idaho, Utah, and Wyoming. Two thirds of them were American citizens. Many of the boys were enrolled in Boy Scouts of America and had to leave their troops. They reorganized in troops in all 10 camps in spite of the limited access to cooking equipment and supplies. Advancement was difficult for these Scouts. Swimming tests were impossible until the Heart Mountain Scouts made their own 150 by 300 feet 15-feet deep pool by hand.

On December 6, 1942, on the eve of the anniversary of Pearl Harbor, tensions were high between pro-Americans and pro-Japanese internees in the Manzanar Camp with a thousand protesters present. As they made their way to the US flagpole to take down the flag, the Scouts came to the rescue. The camp's director told the Associated Press: "The Boy Scouts surrounded the base of the flagpole. [...] They had armed themselves with stones the size of baseballs [and] defied the agitators or the whole mob to touch the flag. And the flag was not hauled down." The Military Police had to intervene to stop the revolt resulting in one dead and several injured and wounded.

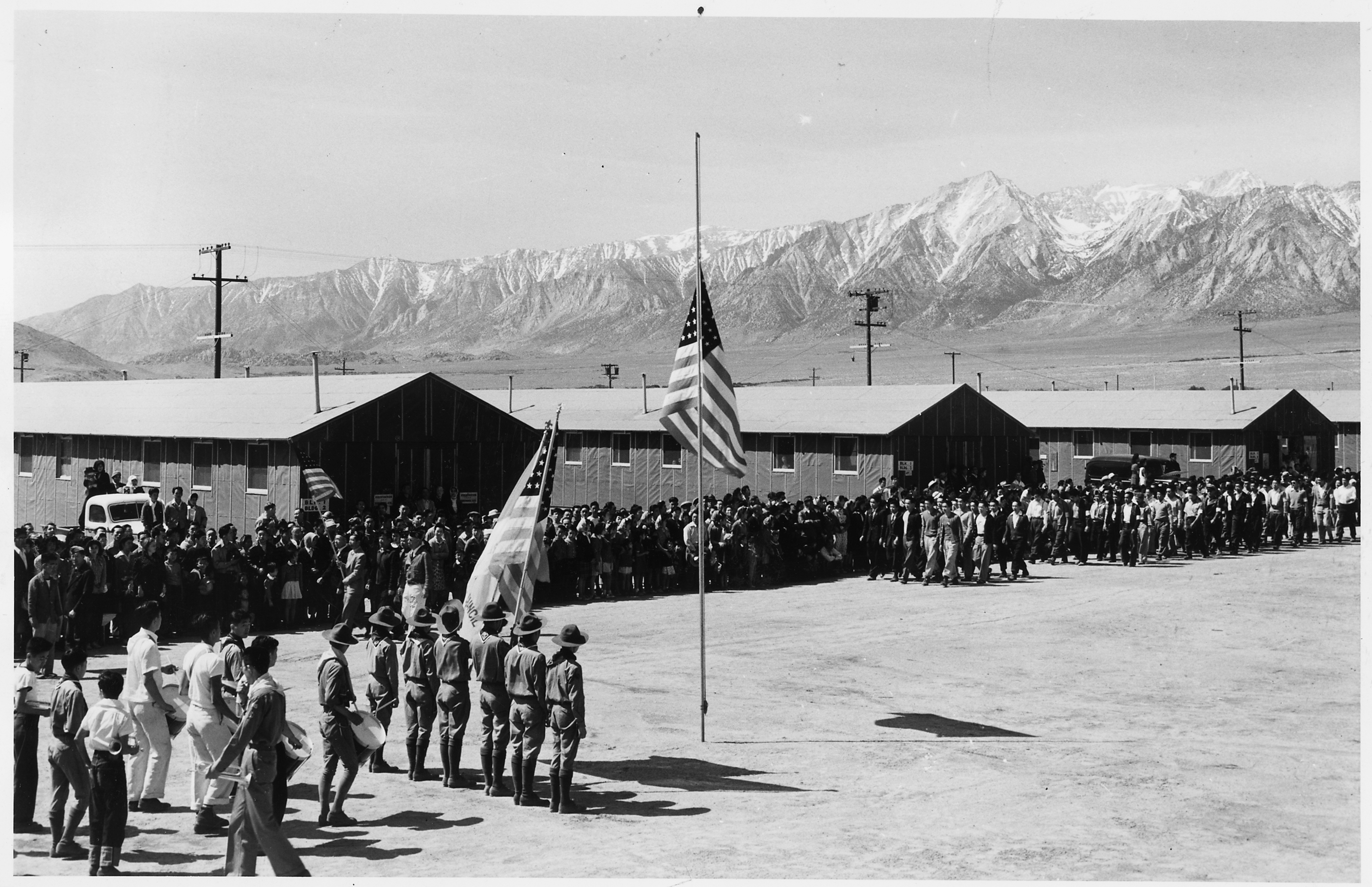
Memorial Day services at Manzanar Camp in 1942 with Boy Scouts performing the flag ceremony

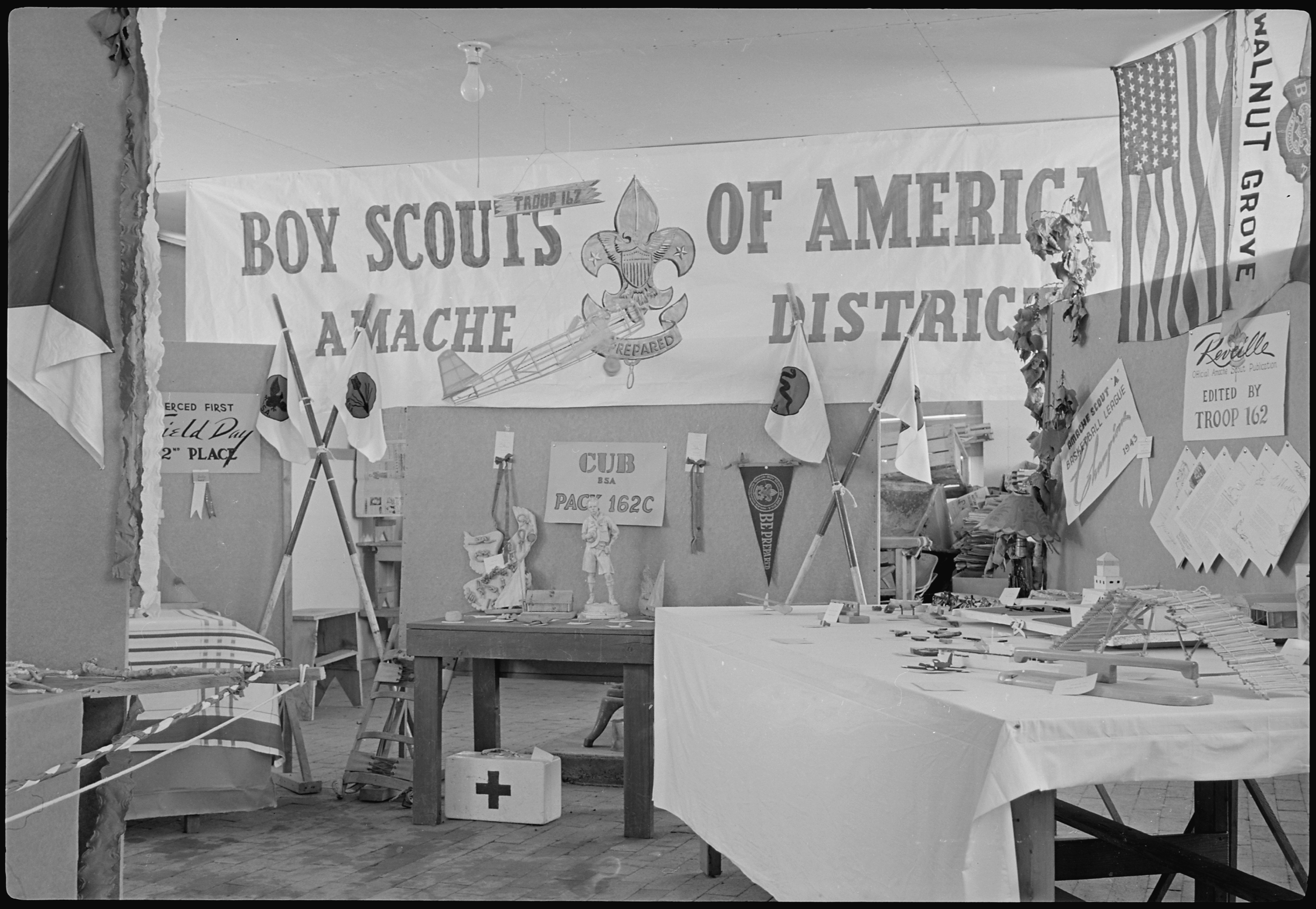
Exhibits of work done by the various boy scout troops at Granada Relocation Center in May 1943

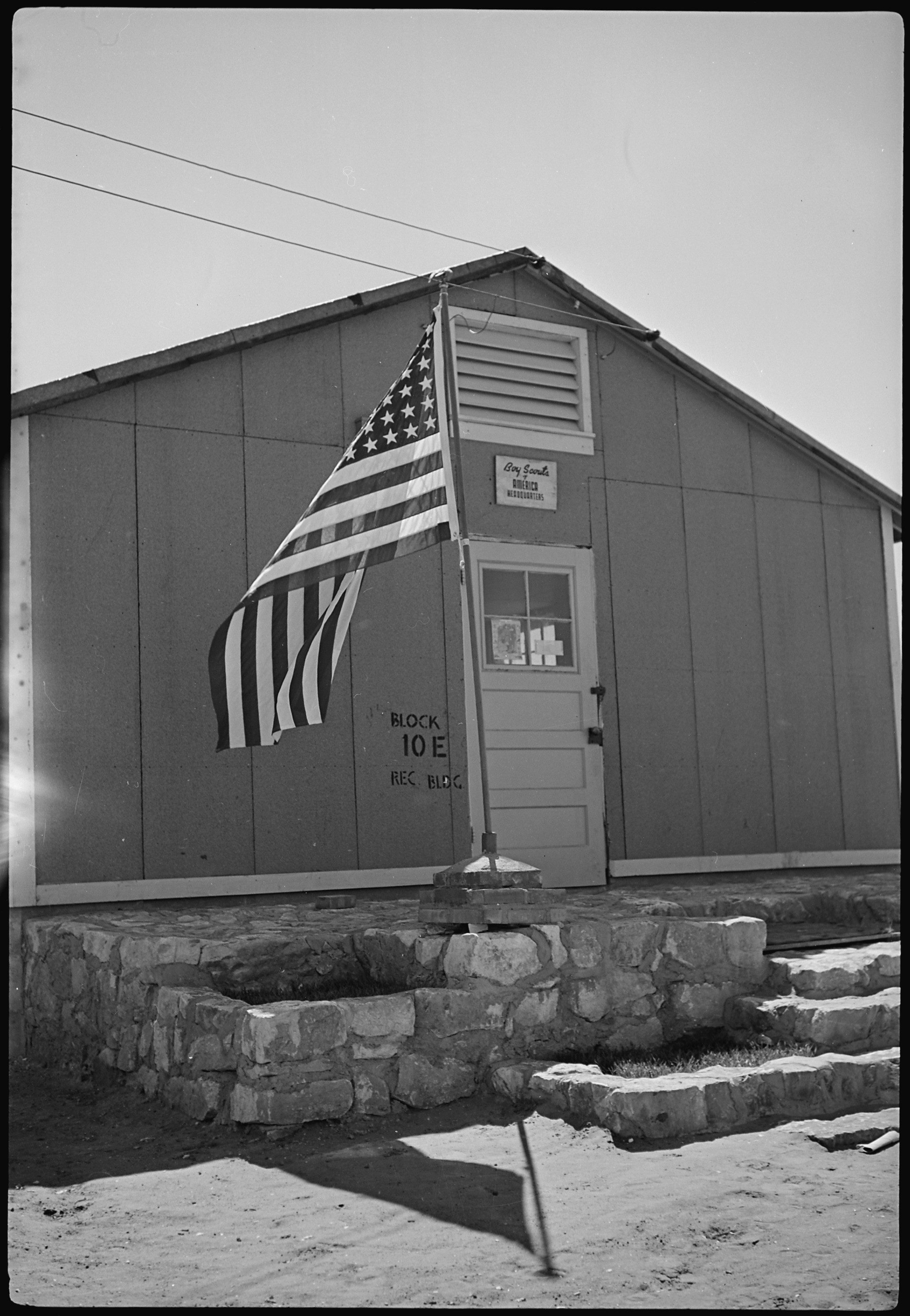
Amache District Headquarters, Boy Scouts of America, Granada Relocation Center in 1943

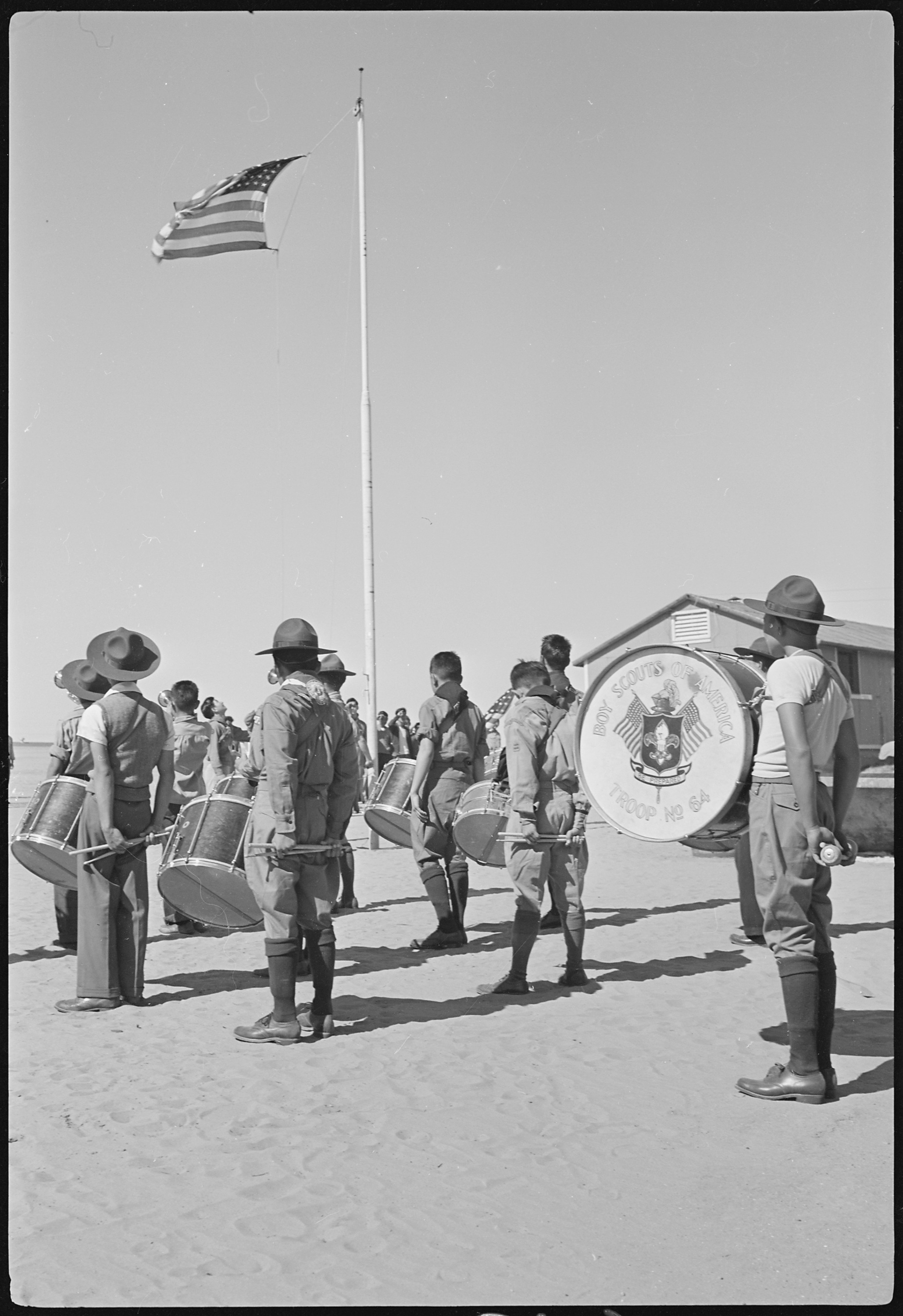
Granada Relocation Center Boy Scout Memorial Day Parade, which was held at this center on May 30, 1943

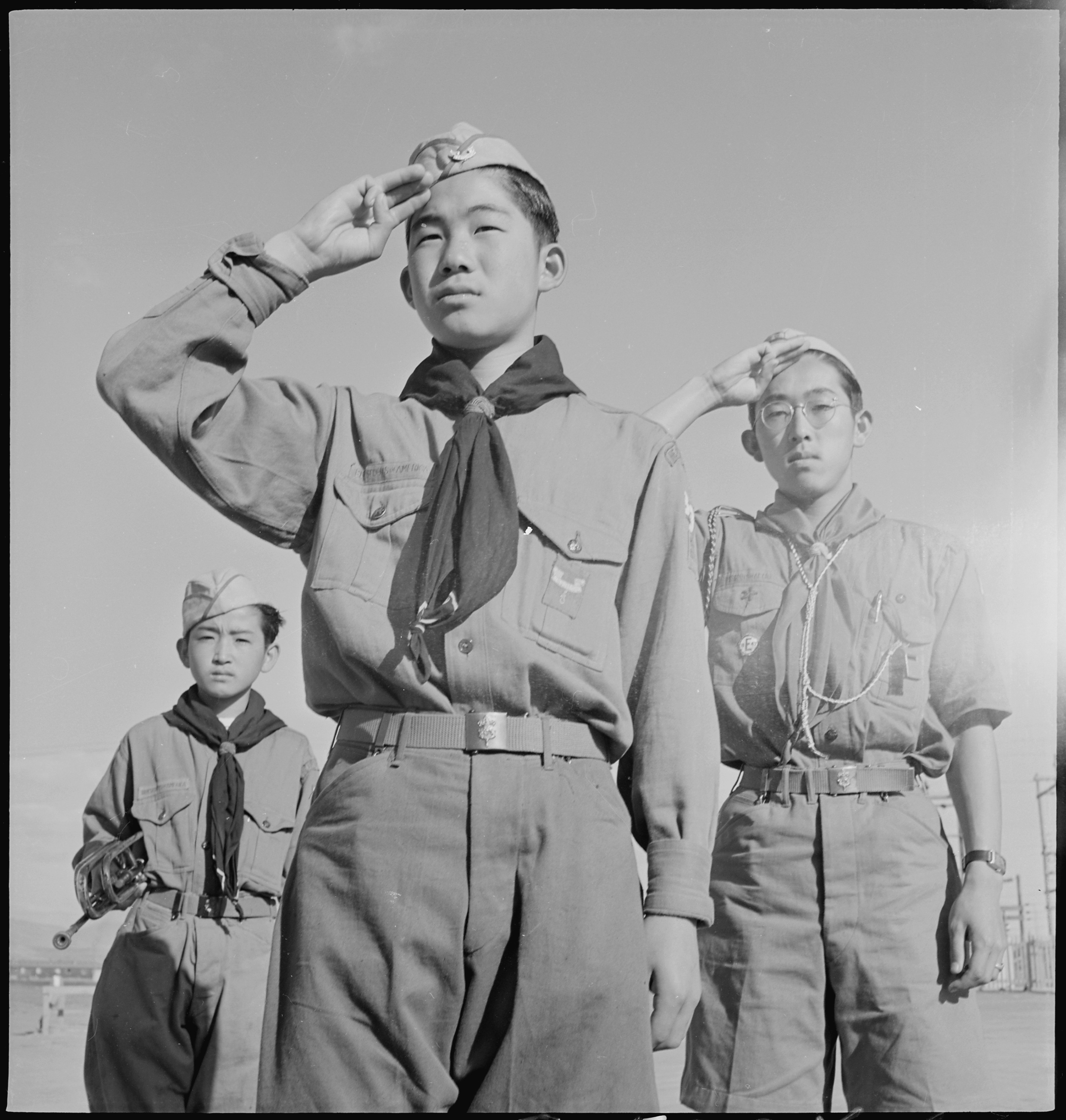
Boy Scouts conducting a morning flag raising ceremony at the Heart Mountain Relocation Center on June 5, 1943

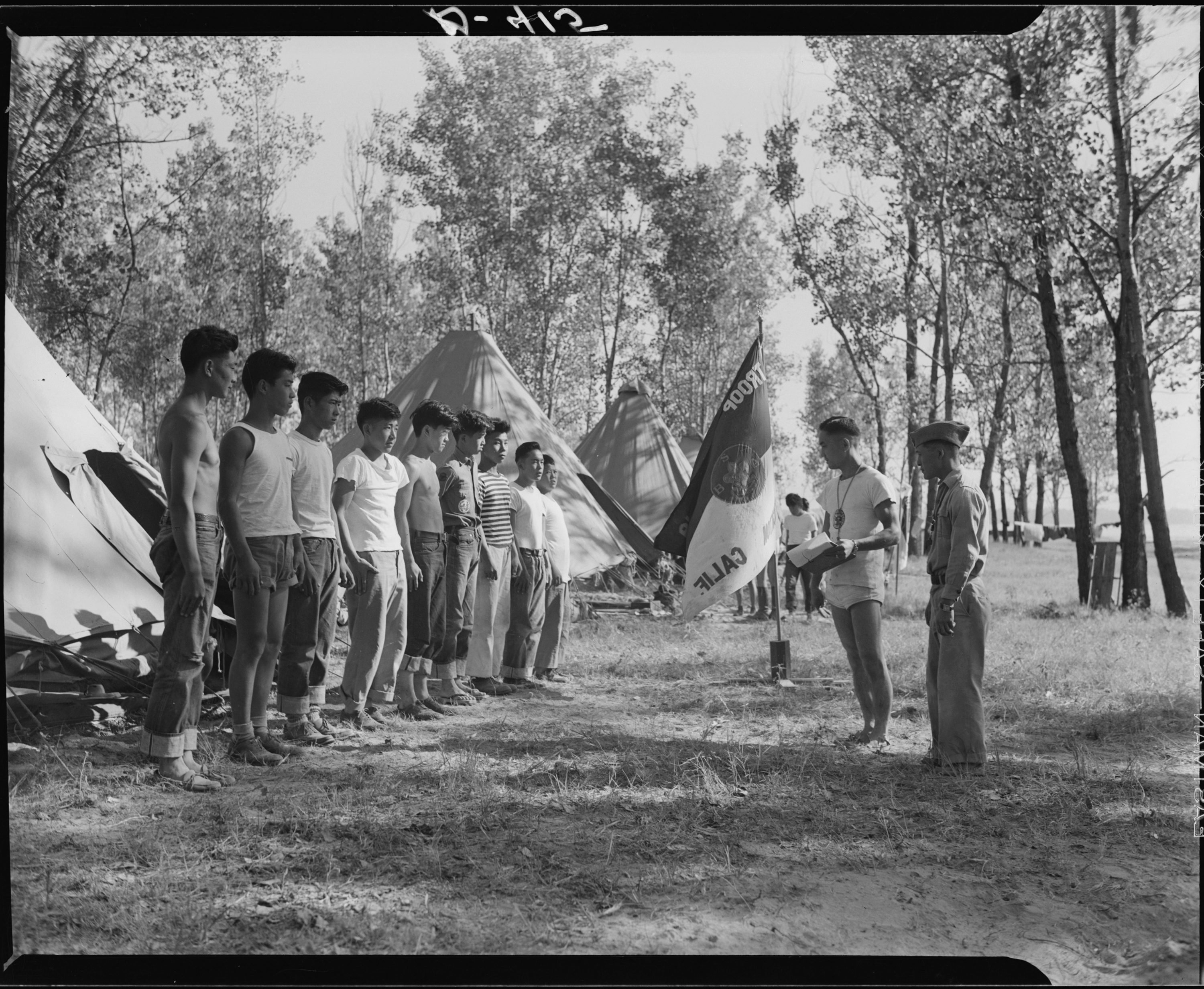
A 5-day Boy Scout Camp on the bank of the Mississippi River was composed of nearly a hundred boys from the Rohwer Center, a few less form the Jerome Center, together with a small troop from the nearby town of Arkansas City in August 1943

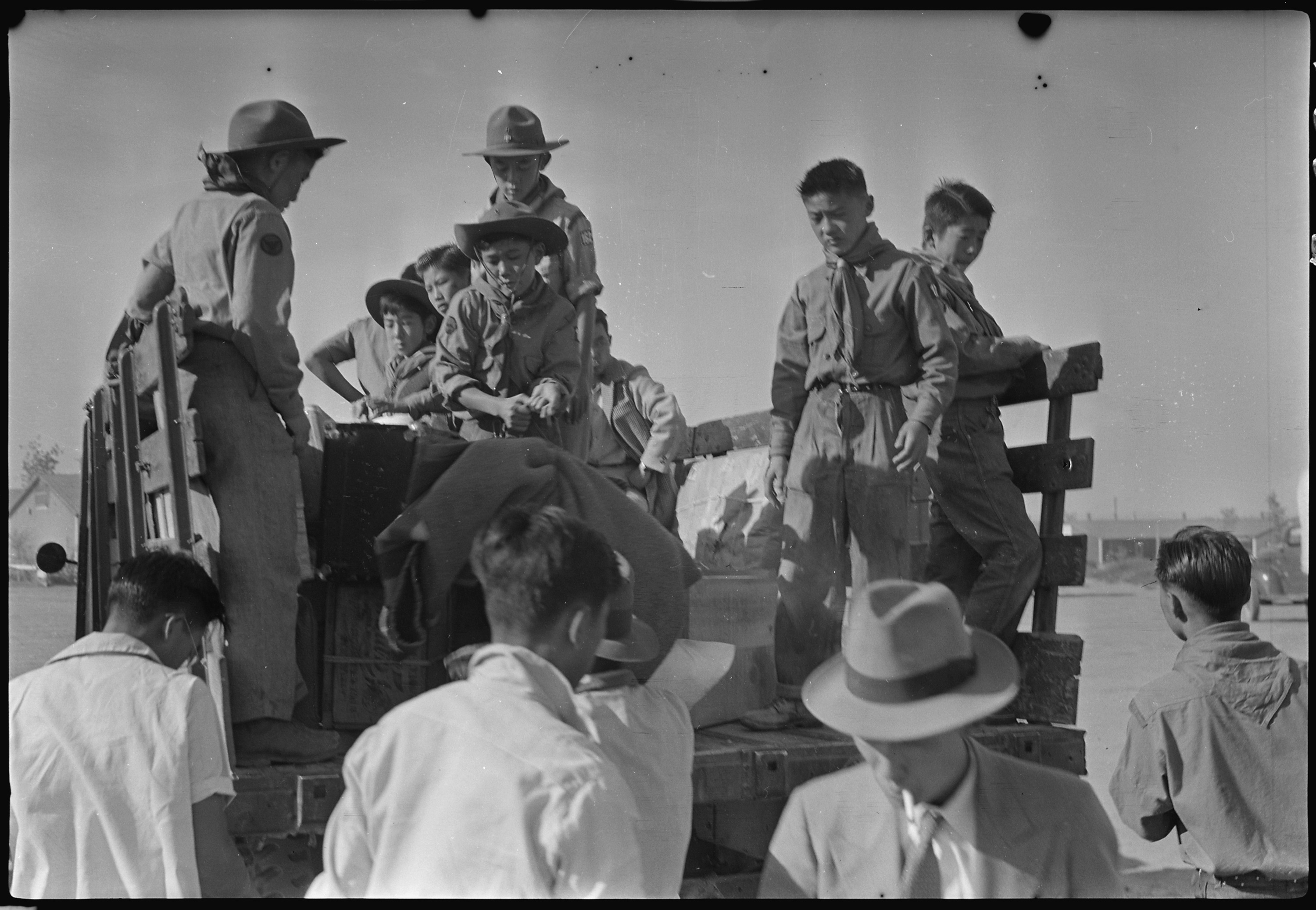
Granada Relocation Center Boy Scouts help with the check baggage in September 1943

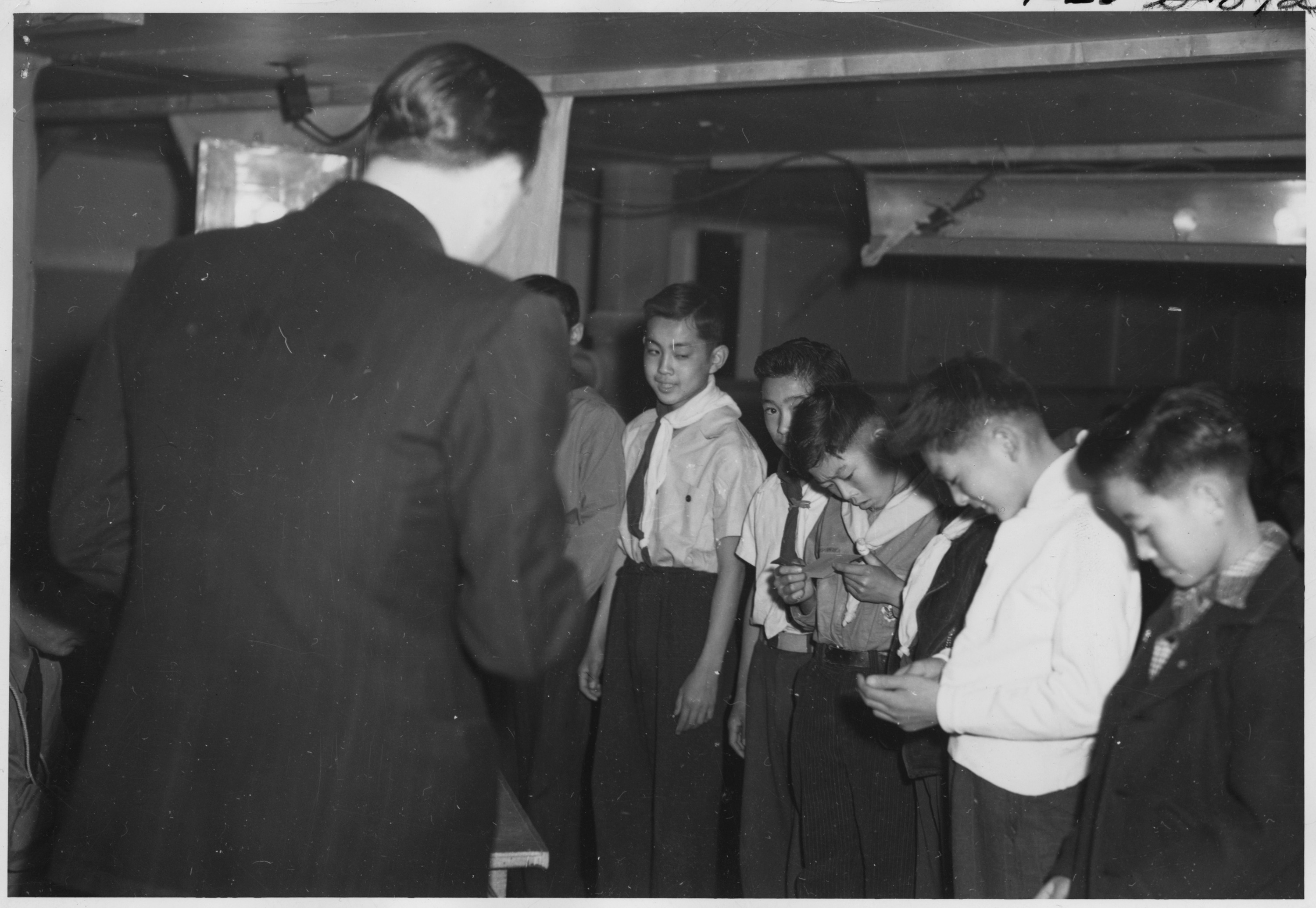
Boy Scouts hold court of Honor at Central Utah Relocation Center at Topaz. Deputy Director, James F. Hughes, presents merit badges to first class scouts.

=== Program Changes ===
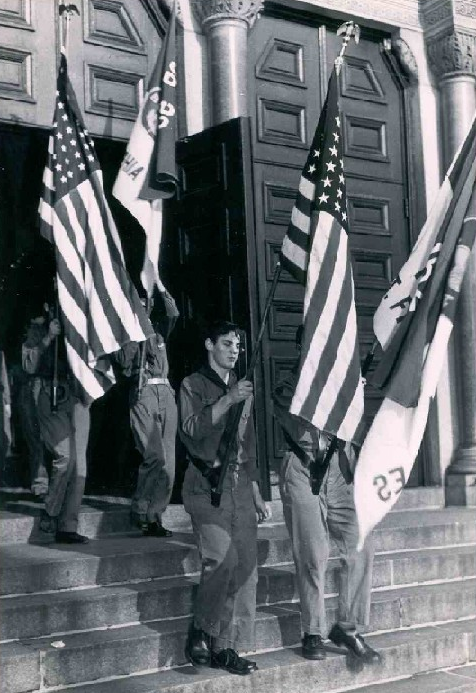
Scout colors in Philadelphia, PA in 1949

In 1941, the Webelos rank was created for 11-½ year-old boys. The first Webelos badge used the emblem today known as the Arrow of Light and was worn on the left pocket flap. Den mothers became optional Cubbing leaders in 1936, eventually becoming a registered position in 1948. The Bob Cat rank was introduced in 1938 as the entry-level badge for a new Cub, with a pin for non-uniform wear. Until 1942, boys joining Cubbing at any age were required to work their way through the ranks, first earning Bob Cat, then Wolf, Bear and Lion, wearing only their current rank and arrow points. After 1942, Bob Cat became a joining rank, then the Cub Scout progressed to the next rank for his age level and all earned rank badges were worn. In 1945, the Cubbing program was renamed to Cub Scouts. 1947 saw the uniform change from knickers to trousers. The age groups were changed to 8, 9 and 10 in 1949. Bob Cat became Bobcat around 1950.

In 1949 the minimum age for a Boy Scout was lowered from 12 to 11 and adults were now proscribed from earning merit badges and youth ranks.

Also in 1949, BSA consolidated the Senior Scout programs into Explorer Scouts. This did not include Sea Scouts and Air Scouts who remained distinct but were renamed Sea Explorers and Air Exploreurs. As part of this transition, the joining age was lowered to 14 instead of the previous 15 year requirement. This new version of the program included three awards: Bronze Award, Silver Award and Gold Award.

=== Order of the Arrow, an Official Program ===
In 1948, the Order of the Arrow became an Official Program of the Boy Scouts of America. It had gones through an extensive revision of its terminology to remove all Masonic terminology that could offend religious groups through the 1930s as a pre-requisite to being integrated to BSA.

=== Second Wood Badge Attempt ===
In 1948, after the war and following West's retirement, a second attempt to bring the Wood Badge to the US took place. A small committee put together a truly American Wood Badge syllabus using the Boy Scouts of America interpretation of the patrol method with the patrol names picked from birds and animals found in every State of the country" Eagle, Bob White, Fox, and Beaver. The first course took place at Schiff Scout Reservation from July 31 to August 8, 1948, with a second one taking place at Philmont Scout Ranch from October 2 to October 10, 1948. Until 1958, this was a mostly national course run but BSA's Volunteer Training Division.

== 1950s ==
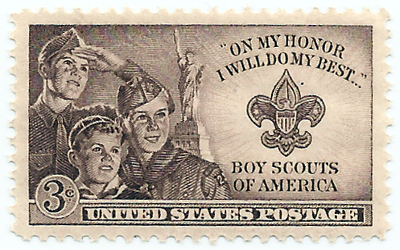
Commemorative BSA stamp first issued in 1950

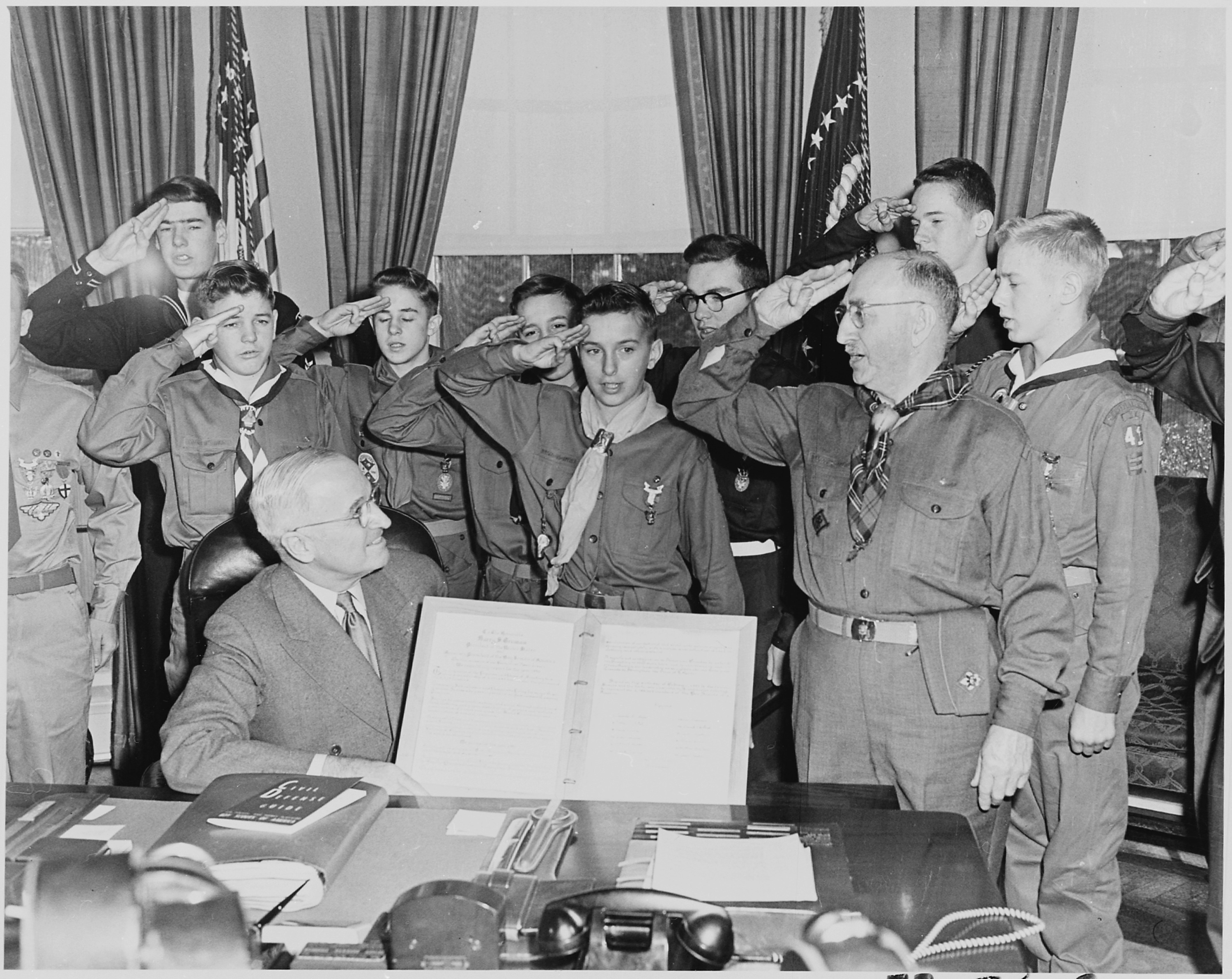
President Truman in the Oval Office receiving some Boy Scouts in February 1951

BSA membership rose dramatically between 1950 and 1960, from 2.8 million to 5.2 million. The 40th anniversary celebrated the theme of "Strengthen the Arm of Liberty." As part of the theme, the BSA distributed over 200 replicas of the Statue of Liberty. The 8-foot-4-inch (2.54 m) copper statues are known as the "Little Sisters of Liberty".

The first pinewood derby was held in 1953, becoming an official part of the program in 1955. In 1954, the Webelos den program was started for 10-½ year olds and a Webelos den emblem was introduced, used on the Webelos den flag and replacing the den number on the uniform. In 1954, the National Council moved its offices from New York City to the southwest corner of U.S. Route 1 and U.S. Route 130 in North Brunswick, New Jersey. The Bobcat pin was approved for uniform wear in 1959.

In 1956, Scouts and Scouters who participated in an approved international activity or event were allowed to wear the World Crest (a white fleur-de-lis surrounded by a white cord with a square knot on a purple background) as a permanent award. Local councils were allowed to present the crest in 1957. Until then, it has been reserved to the BSA's International Service only. Until 1989, the requirements were: "Take part in an organized international activity or event with Scouts from another member nation of the World Association". After that date, all youth members and adults, both volunteer and professional would wear it as a "sign of world brotherhood and unity with other members of the international Scouting community."

In 1959, the Boy Scout Handbook's dimensions increased to their present size and it was printed in full color for the first time. Cub Scouts and Boy Scouts lowered their age limits, and Exploring was extensively modified to include vocational exploration.

That same year, the Explorer Program was renamed the Exploring Program.

== 1960s ==
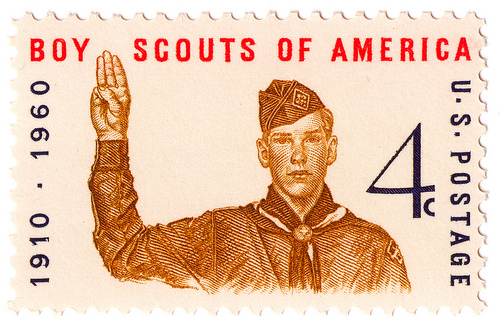
Stamp US 1960 4c Boy Scouts of America to commemorate the 50th Anniversary of BSA

In 1960, the organization celebrated its golden jubilee. The 1960s saw the peak periods of membership for the BSA in almost every category, as the Baby Boomer generation had its Scout-age boys joining packs and troops across the country. Exploring was becoming more oriented to career-exploration as a primary emphasis. The BSA was applauded by most for firmly prohibiting racial discrimination in its rules and regulations.

The Air Scouts program established in 1941 and renamed Air Explorers in 1949, was disestablished in 1965 and fully merged into the then existing Explorer program of the BSA as a specialty called 'Aviation Explorers', eventually discontinuing its uniforms by the early 1970s. It still exists today as part of the BSA's Learning for Life Explorer program. A parallel program with a nautical emphasis known as Sea Scouts continues to exist today as Sea Scouting, part of the Venturing program that the Boy Scouts of America offers for young men and women.

Most of the big changes in program elements during the decade of the 1960s were in Cub Scouting, and were directed at retaining the oldest Cub Scouts who were dropping out before they were old enough to graduate to Boy Scouting. In 1967, the Lion badge and traditional parent-directed advancement for 10-year-olds was discarded for the new Webelos program, which became more focused on the transition to Boy Scouting. The Webelos program introduced 15 topical activity badges alongside the Arrow of Light badge requirements. A new Webelos colors badge was developed to hold the activity badge pins, and the hat and neckerchief featured the new Webelos symbol. The meaning of Webelos was changed to We'll Be Loyal Scouts.

Also in 1967, the den mother position was changed to den leader and opened to males and females, and the den leader coach position was added as a trainer of den leaders.

In 1969, young women between the ages of 14 and 20 were allowed to join special-interest Explorer posts.

1960s Boy Scouts of America Membership
	1960	1961	1962	1963	1964	1965	1966	1967	1968	1969
Cub Scouts	1,865,120	1,868,693	1,892,797	1,931,130	1,982,280	2,063,743	2,125,394	2,243,174	2,351,356	2,380,336
Boy Scouts	1,647,327	1,658,193	1,708,707	1,771,134	1,823,302	1,850,488	1,853,316	1,908,183	1,944,641	1,909,299
Explorers	270,626	286,341	307,981	314,030	317,614	316,805	310,669	309,754	312,022	302,349
Total Youth Membership	3,783,073	3,813,227	3,909,485	4,016,294	4,123,196	4,231,036	4,289,379	4,461,111	4,608,019	4,591,984
Total Adult Leaders	1,377,885	1,397,067	1,412,682	1,430,611	1,462,504	1,501,672	1,542,162	1,597,397	1,639,141	1,591,102
Total Units	130,368	132,626	135,389	136,844	140,191	144,538	147,188	149,454	152,312	152,884

== 1970s ==
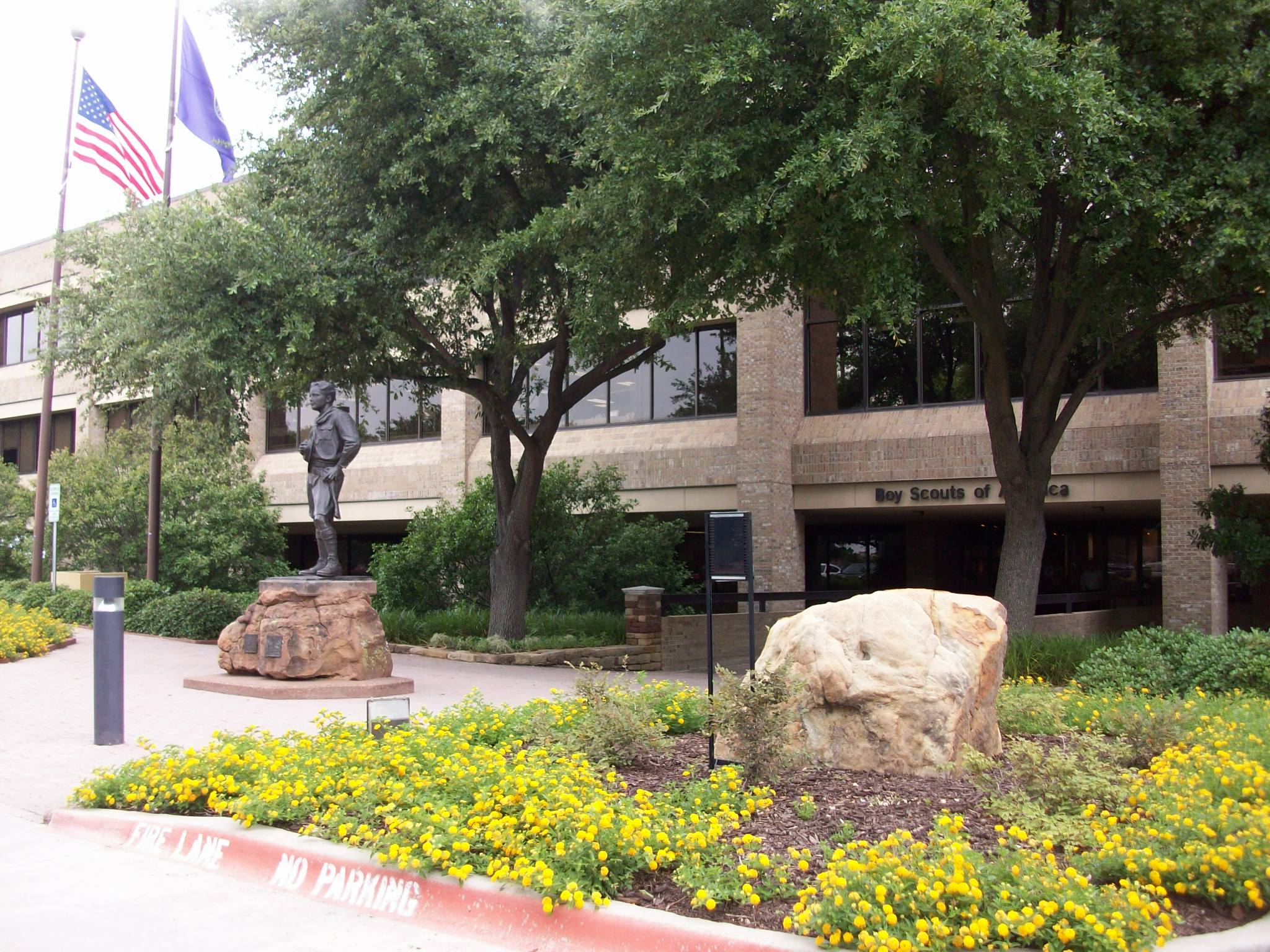
BSA National Office in Irving, Texas

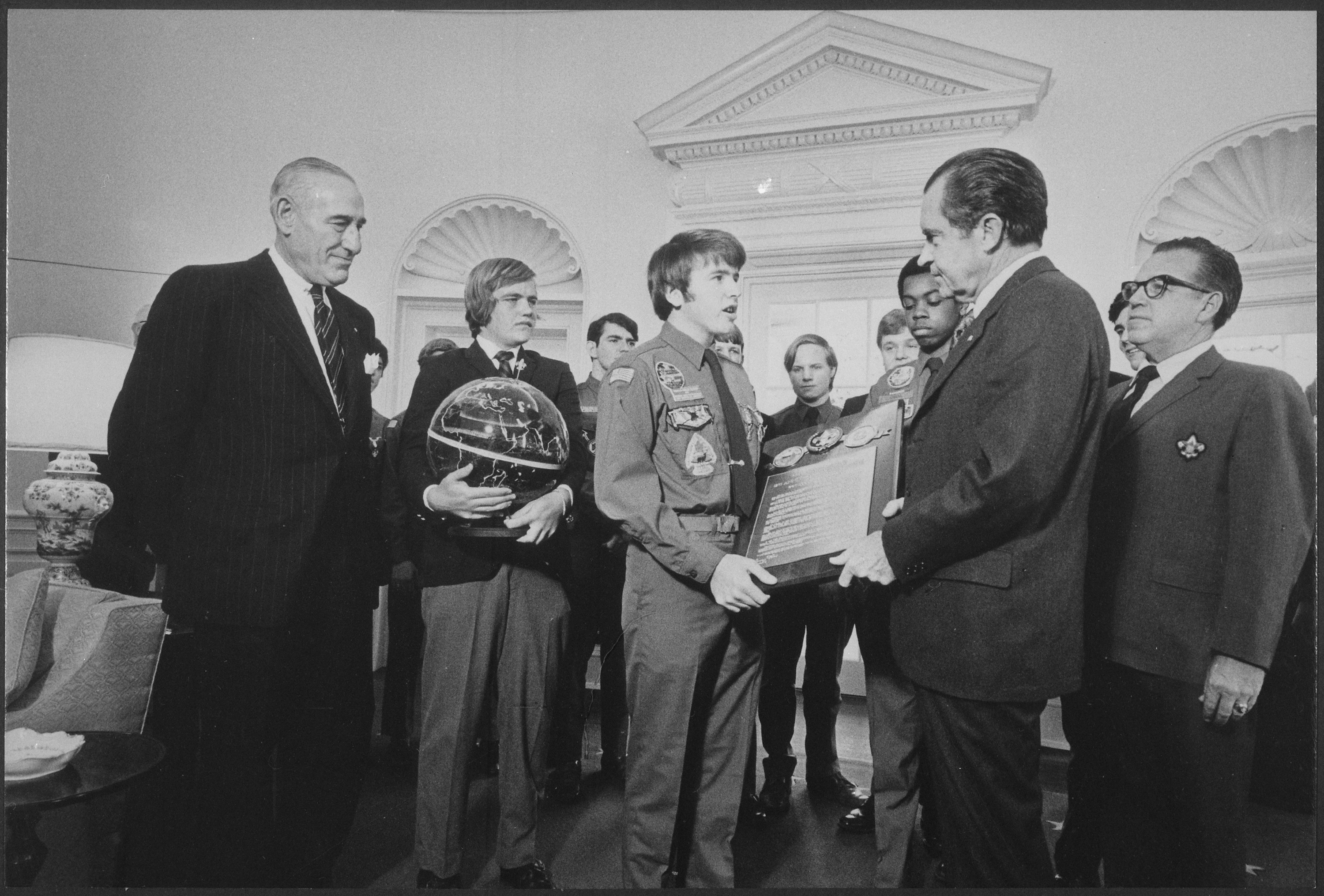
Boy Scouts of America present the 1971 Report to President Nixon

The BSA commissioned a series of studies and developed an updated program to modernize Scouting in a manner similar to the changes the British Boy Scout Association had introduced in 1967.

In the 1970s, the BSA made a move to rebrand itself as "Scouting/USA." They abandoned this effort by 1980.

The national headquarters moved to Irving, Texas in 1979.

=== Outdoors skills de-emphasized ===
In September 1972 the Boy Scouts launched the "Improved Scouting Program," publishing a radically revised handbook with less emphasis on outdoor skills for the three lower ranks. Skill Awards for Hiking, Camping, and Cooking included outdoor skills requirements and were required for Second Class and First Class Scouts. Several outdoor merit badges were removed from the list of those required to become an Eagle Scout; those removed from the list included Camping, Cooking, Nature, Swimming, and Lifesaving. The Scoutcraft information and requirements were replaced by information on drug abuse, family finances, child care and community problems. The use of boy was de-emphasized: the eighth edition of the handbook was titled simply Scout Handbook and the new strategic logo used Scouting/USA. The concept of the personal growth agreement conferences was introduced as a requirement for each rank.

Other changes included new colored cloth badges for all ranks and positions and "skill awards", represented by a metal loop worn on the belt, that were awarded instantly at the time they were earned. They supplemented individual rank requirements which along with merit badges were also presented immediately, and recognized later at the court of honor. The merit badge program—previously only available to First Class and above—was opened to all ranks, and merit badges were required for Tenderfoot, Second Class and First Class. The number of required merit badges for Eagle Scout was increased to 24, and Camping merit badge was dropped from the required list. The entry age was changed to 11 or 10-½ if a boy had finished fifth grade.

In 1971 the Cub Scout Promise was changed from "to be square" to "to help other people", as the term square went from meaning honest to rigidly conventional. The Boy Scouts also introduced a new Webelos badge and converted the former Webelos badge into the Arrow of Light.

For the first time the handbook emphasized modern conservation practices, de-emphasizing pioneering and introducing modern knife and ax usage. It eliminated the destructive practice of ditching around tents.

The Senior Boy Scout program was replaced by the Leadership Corps. Initially the Leadership Corps was limited to leaders 14–15; older boys were expected to become junior assistant Scoutmasters or move to Exploring. The Leadership Corps could wear the forest green shirt with a Scout BSA strip until it was discontinued in 1979. The Leadership Corps patch was worn in place of the patrol patch, The first version of the patch was trapezoidal, replaced by a round patch in 1987. The red beret was initially introduced for the Leadership Corps, and extended for troop wear in 1973.

=== Junior leader training revised ===
Troop Leader Development (TLD), adapted from the White Stag Leadership Development Program, was introduced in 1974 to train youth leaders. The Cornerstone program was introduced to train adult leaders. Leaders who completed the course were recognized by a special version of the leader's emblem that was embroidered with mylar thread, giving a shiny look.

From the early 1920s, the BSA had been divided into 12 numbered regions, each designated by a Roman numeral, which consisted of territories of several states. The 12 regions followed the organization of the federal reserve system at that time. In 1972, the 12 regions were consolidated into a new alignment of six geographic regions (Northeast, East Central, Southeast, North Central, South Central, and Western).

In 1973, most Cub Scout leadership positions were opened to women, and in 1976 the Cubmaster, assistant Cubmaster, and all commissioner positions could also be filled by women.

Catherine Pollard was the first female Scoutmaster in the Boy Scouts of America; she led Boy Scout Troop 13 in Milford, Connecticut from 1973 to 1975, but the Boy Scouts of America refused to recognize her as a Scoutmaster until 1988.

=== Return to traditional Scouting ===
1970s-era Scouting/USA branding

The changes in the advancement requirements were a disastrous failure for Scouting and membership plummeted. The BSA lured William "Green Bar Bill" Hillcourt out of retirement in 1979 and he spent an entire year writing the 9th Edition of the Boy Scout Handbook. It was a return to the traditional Scouting program after the disastrous membership losses suffered by the 1970s program. From a peak of 6.5 million Scouts in 1972, membership declined to a low of 4.3 million in 1980. The 9th Edition has a great deal in common with prior editions of the handbooks that Hillcourt had helped write. The new edition reproduced entire paragraphs and pictures from the earlier editions.

In 1976 the National Boy Scouts discontinued the Improved Scouting Program and introduced "All Out for Scouting", a back-to-basics program developed by Hillcourt. The program was launched with "Brownsea Double-Two", a week-long course for the senior patrol leader who would then introduce the troop-level "Operation Flying Start" to their units. It emphasized teaching and practicing Scout skills, the purposes of Scouting, and the role of the patrol method within the troop program. Many councils ran both Brownsea and Troop Leader Development, but some councils held only one or the other. The number of Eagle required merit badges was reduced back to 21, and Camping was restored to the required list.

In 1979, the next iteration of junior leader training was introduced in the Troop Leader Training Conference. It replaced TLD and Brownsea Double-Two. It was published with the intent "to eventually replace Troop Leader Development (#6544) and also provide the Scoutcraft skills experiences of Brownsea Double Two." This paralleled a roll-back of an urban emphasis in Scouting which had removed mention of the word "campfire" from the 8th edition of the Boy Scout Handbook.

While the stated aim was to consolidate the two programs, many councils continued to put on both programs or used elements from the previous programs, producing inconsistency in how junior leader training was delivered nationwide.

=== Explorers ===
In 1971, full membership in Exploring was opened up to women in Exploring. The maximum age limit was also raised to 21. In addition, at every level Explorer Presidents' Association were developed. This provided election of national officers, program workshops, youth involvement and leadership training.

== 1980s ==
In 1980, the new Boy Scout uniform designed by Oscar de la Renta was introduced.

Tiger Cubs were started in 1982 as a pack associated program for seven-year-old boys; the uniform consisted of an orange T-shirt and a cap. The Tiger Cub Promise was "I promise to love God, my family and my country, and to learn about the world." The Tiger Cub Motto was "Search, Discover, Share."

In 1984, the Varsity Scouts program was launched. Stemming from an idea dating back to the mid-1970s and developed by Scouting leaders in The Church of Jesus Christ of Latter-day Saints, its goal was to retain older Boy Scouts. Using sports terminology, the program was focused on high adventure, sports and service. The target audience was boys from 14 to 17 of age. Instead of a patrol, they were organized in squads in a team (instead of a troop) and were led by a coach (in place of a Scoutmaster).

In 1984, several uniform changes were brought in. Webelos Scouts were given the option to wear the Boy Scout uniform with Webelos cap, neckerchief, insignia and blue shoulder loops. The original yellow Cub Scout neckerchief became the Wolf Cub Scout neckerchief and Bear Cub Scouts got their own light blue neckerchief. In 1986, Cub Scout membership was changed from age-based to school grade-based and the Webelos Scout program was expanded to two years.

President Reagan's Remarks on the 75th Anniversary of the Boy Scouts of America on February 8, 1985

In 1985, the organization celebrated its diamond jubilee. On February 8, 1985, President Ronald Reagan and the First Lady hosted a lunch to celebrate the event. Nancy Reagan was made honorary Boy Scout. Proclamation 5421 was issued by the White House on December 15, 1985.

In 1989, some of the last elements of the Improved Scout Program ended when the skill award program was discontinued and the individual requirements were returned to the ranks. The Leadership Corps program was eliminated and the Venture crew and Varsity team programs for older boys 14–17 within the troop were introduced. Initially, girls were allowed to participate in team and crew activities, but this was later quietly dropped. These programs used the Venture/Varsity Letter with activity pins for recognition. The Varsity team program within the troop was discontinued in 1996. When the Venturing program was introduced in 1998, Venture crews were redesignated as Venture patrols. In early 2005, confusion has been raised over whether the BSA quietly stopped allowing Venture Patrols to use the Venture/Varsity Letter and activity pins, restricting them to just Varsity Scouts. The published statement said "only Varsity Scouts can earn the program's Varsity letter...". The statement omits the point however that members of a Venture patrol can still earn a Venture letter and activity pins. The BSA's 2007 Official Placement of Insignia specifies the placement of the Venture letter on the merit badge sash. Initially, the youth leaders were the Venture crew chief and assistant crew chief and the Varsity team captain and team co-captain. The adult leaders were the assistant Scoutmaster Venture and the assistant Scoutmaster Varsity. All of these positions and the emblems were eliminated except for assistant Scoutmaster Venture.

== 1990s ==
In 1990, requirements for the World Crest were changed to taking part in an international exhibit or display or an international event. The requirements were eliminated in 1991, and all Scouts now wear the World Crest as a display of world brotherhood in Scouting. The International Activity Patch replaced the World Crest as an emblem of participation in an international event.

In 1992, the six regions were consolidated into four to reduce manpower needs: Western, Central, Southern and Northeast.

The Cub Scout Academics program, introduced in 1992, became the Cub Scout Academics and Sports program in 1996.

In 1996, the Tiger Cub was presented with a Tiger Cub BSA emblem for wear on the blue Cub Scout uniform after graduating into the pack.

On February 9, 1998, the Venturing program was created by BSA. The Exploring program was completely overhauled and split in two categories. Career-oriented posts were moved to Learning for Life under Exploring while the others including outdoor-oriented posts went under the Venturing program. Sea Exploring became Sea Scouting under Venturing. This new program retained the green uniform used by Exploring as well as the renamed Explorer Code and a new Oath. That same year in August, the Venturing Silver Award (based on the Explorer Silver Award) was created alone with the Gold Award. Five Bronze Awards were also introduced: Arts and Hobbies, Sea Scouts, Sports, Outdoors and Religious Life. The Venturing Ranger Award was introduced for recognition of Venturers with a high level of expertise in outdoor skills.

In 1994, in Commerce Township, Michigan, David Hahn, an Eagle Scout and later known as Radioactive Boy Scout or Nuclear Boy Scout, built a homemade neutron source in his mother's shed. The Federal Bureau of Investigation (FBI) and the Nuclear Regulatory Commission (NRC) issued a Federal Radiological Emergency Response and the house where Hahn lived was quarantined. The site of his family's property was declared a Superfund for cleanup. His neutron source, the shed where he made it, and the contents were buried in Utah as low-level radioactive waste.

== 2000s ==
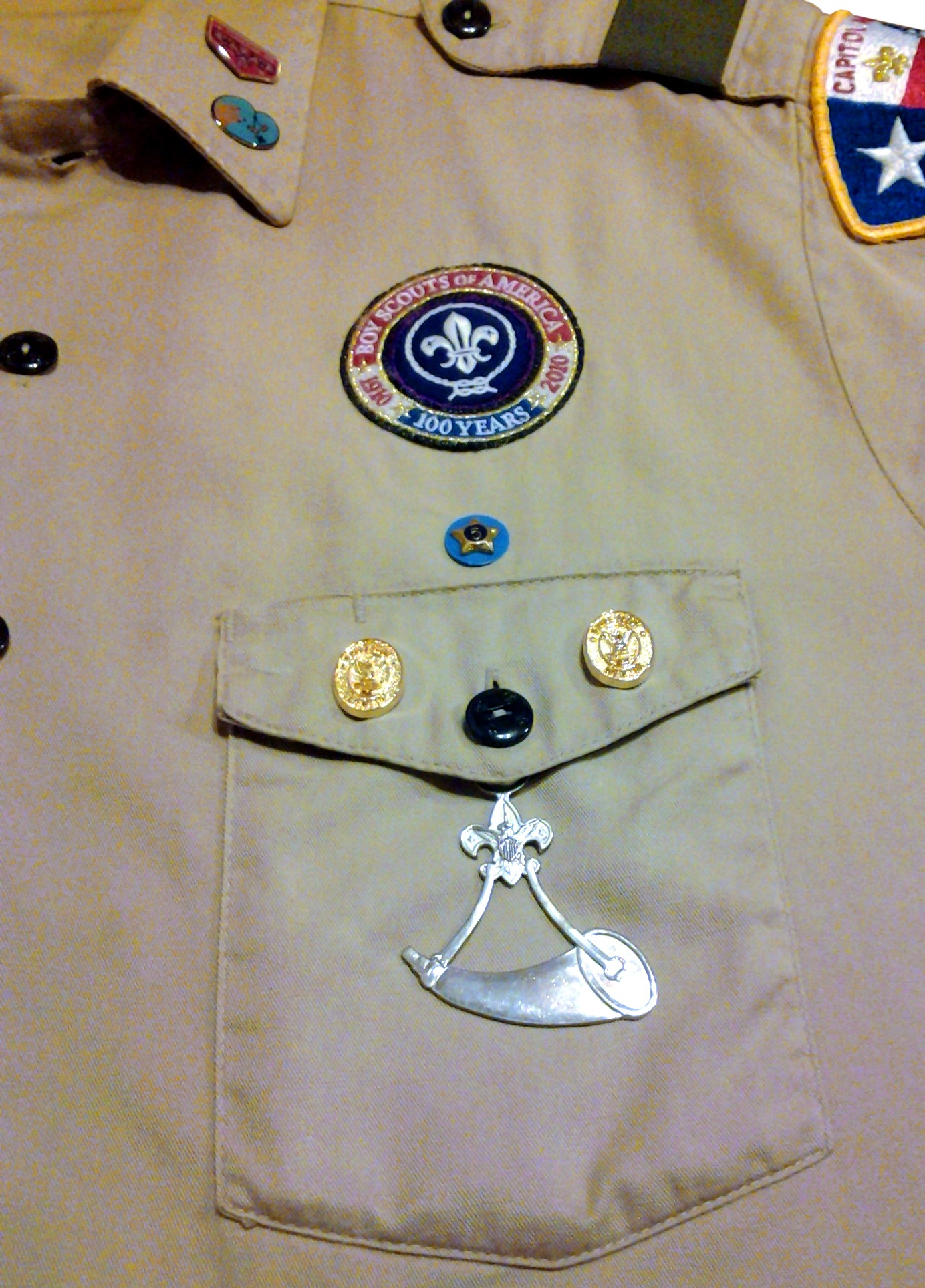
World Crest with the 1910 Anniversary Ring in 2013

The Tiger Cub Den became an integrated part of the pack in 2001 and the standard blue uniform was adopted with Tiger Cub hat, neckerchief and slide. The Tiger Cub strip was replaced by the diamond shaped badge and the Tiger Cub Promise was replaced by the Cub Scout Promise.

In June 2000, the question of homosexuality in the Boy Scouts made it to the Supreme Court of the United States. In Boy Scouts of America v. Dale, the Court ruled that BSA could bar homosexuals from being troop leaders because as a private organization, it has the First Amendment Right to associate with anyone.

In 2004, the Scoutreach division launched the Scouting and Soccer program with an emphasis on outreach to Hispanic/Latino youth and families. The Tiger Cub Motto was replaced by the Cub Scout Motto in 2006. A new version of the Webelos badge was introduced, oval shaped like the Boy Scout badges and worn only on the khaki shirt. In June 2006, in a move to align Tiger Cubs with the rest of the Cub Scout program, Tiger Cubs were required to earn the Bobcat badge first.

In 2008, a special ring was designed to go around the 1957 World Crest. It was designed to commemorate the 100th anniversary of Boy Scouts of America. Like the World Crest it can be worn by any scout, venturer, volunteer or professional.

== 2010s ==
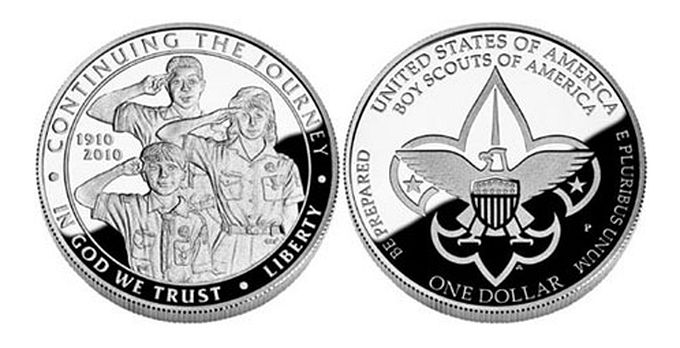
Boy Scouts of America, 100th Anniversary Commemorative Silver Dollar

In 2011, the BSA's Messengers of Peace program was launched. The World Organization of the Scout Movement (WOSM) wanted to encourage Scouts around the world to do what they could to make the world a better place. The BSA program utilizes the framework offered by WOSM to encourage all youth (including cub scouts) and adult leaders. A special Ring to be place around the World Crest (and in lieu of the 100 Anniversary Ring) was issues for those who fulfilled the requirements.

On May 23, 2013, the 1,400 voting members of the National Council of the Boy Scouts of America voted, 61% to 38%, to allow openly gay boys to join the Scouts, beginning in January 2014. Openly gay adults were still forbidden to be leaders.

In 2014, Pascal Tessier, a 17-year-old from Chevy Chase, Maryland, became the first known openly gay Boy Scout to be an Eagle Scout.

In 2015, Tessier became the first openly gay adult Boy Scout to be hired as a summer camp leader when he was hired by the Boy Scouts’ New York chapter, Greater New York Councils.

On July 27, 2015, the BSA National Executive Board removed the national restriction on openly gay adult leaders and employees, but allowed local organizations to continue to discriminate. The new policy said, "Chartered organizations continue to select their adult leaders and religious chartered organizations may continue to use religious beliefs as criteria for selecting adult leaders, including matters of sexuality. This change allows Scouting’s members and parents to select local units, chartered to organizations with similar beliefs, that best meet the needs of their families. This change also allows religious chartered organizations to choose adult volunteer leaders whose beliefs are consistent with their own."

On October 11, 2017, the BSA Board of Directors unanimously voted to allow girls to join all of its programs. "This decision is true to the BSA’s mission and core values outlined in the Scout Oath and Law. The values of Scouting – trustworthy, loyal, helpful, kind, brave and reverent, for example – are important for both young men and women," said Michael Surbaugh, the BSA's Chief Scout Executive. "We believe it is critical to evolve how our programs meet the needs of families interested in positive and lifelong experiences for their children. We strive to bring what our organization does best – developing character and leadership for young people – to as many families and youth as possible as we help shape the next generation of leaders."

On May 2, 2018, the BSA announced a new name for its Boy Scout program: Scouts BSA. The Cub Scout program had already started admitting girls and Scouts BSA would begin accepting girls in February 2019.

In fall 2018, after a two-year pilot program, the Lion Cub den was added. The Lion Den is for kindergarten-age kids, with reduced requirements compared to other dens.

On Feb 1, 2019, the Scouts BSA program began admitting girls and chartering new girl troops.

== 2020s ==
From 2019 to 2020, membership in the BSA programs dropped by 43%, from 1.97 million to 1.12 million. This was due in part to the COVID-19 pandemic but also to children being interested in other activities such as sports leagues, busy life schedule and the perception that BSA is "old fashioned". The Girl Scouts also experienced a similar drop in numbers. As a response to the drop in membership and therefore funding (dropping from $394 million in 2019 to $187 million), the membership fee rose from $66 to $72 in August 2021.

On Feb 18, 2020, the Boy Scouts of America national organization filed for Chapter 11 bankruptcy, to create a sustainable means of compensating victims of past Boy Scouts of America sex abuse cases, while also allowing scouting to continue at the local level.

In March 2020, as the COVID-19 pandemic caused difficulties around in-person scouting, the BSA launched "Scouting at Home", and published exemptions and extensions to allow flexibility in the face of quarantines and social distancing requirements.

In 2023, BSA agreed to pay $2.46 billion to settle claims by some 82,000 former Boy Scouts who said they had been sexually abused by BSA officials and volunteers.

In 2026, BSA combined the boy and girl handbooks into one unified handbook.

== Varsity Scouts ==
In 1984, the Varsity Scout program was rolled out as an official program of the BSA for boys ages 14–17. This program is designed to retain older Scouts with additional award opportunities and program elements not available to younger Scouts, as well as attract high-school age young men interested in sports and high adventure activities, but had no Scouting background. The youth leader of each Varsity Scout team is called the captain, and the adult leader is called the Varsity Coach.

In 1989, with rollout of the Venture program, the Varsity letter was redesigned for the use of the Venture Crew as well, and activity pins were added. More recently, the Denali Award was introduced to recognize outstanding achievement by a Varsity Scout. Varsity Scouts are also eligible to earn the ranks and merit badges prescribed for Boy Scouts. It is considered a subset of the overall Boy Scout program.

While remaining relatively small compared to Venturing and Exploring, the program has persisted, probably due to LDS' policy to charter Varsity Teams for all 14- to 15-year-old boys in the United States. In recent years, the number of teams chartered by other organizations has increased. In 2001, revised Varsity Scout manuals were released.

In May 2016, the LDS Church announced that effective January 1, 2018, the Church will discontinue its Varsity and Venturing Scouting programs for young men ages 14–18 in the United States and Canada, replacing them with a new activities program. In August of that year, BSA announced discontinuance of Varsity Scouting nationwide by December 31, 2017.

== Exploring and Venturing ==
Shortly after Boy Scouting was founded in the United States, its creators encountered a problem with older boys. Some grew bored with the program, usually around 14–15, while others didn't want to leave their troops after reaching the age of 18. To alleviate this problem, a number of new programs were created for older boys over time, including the Sea Scouts (1912), Senior Scouts and Explorer Scouts (1935), Rover Scouts (c. 1938), and Air Scouts (1942). Around 1935, most of these were brought together under the overall Senior Scout Division. In 1949, these programs were reworked into Exploring, which included Sea Explorers and Air Explorers. In 1958, these were further re-worked and condensed into a unified Exploring program with Air Explorers and Sea Explorers as relatively independent sub-groups.

In the 1950s and beyond, many Explorer posts chose to become specialty posts, with the encouragement of the BSA. Many of these posts were chartered to businesses and government agencies (such as police, fire departments and hospitals). In the 1960s and further into the 1970s, this career education emphasis became an important aspect of the overall Exploring program. However, outdoor-oriented posts, as well as those specializing in sports and hobbies also were popular, and some were quite large.

Continuing surveys of teenage boys done by the BSA indicated that Explorer-age teenagers, including current Explorers, were interested in including young women in their group activities. The BSA made the first change in this direction in 1969 by opening special-interest posts to young women to be "associate members". After two years, the BSA decided to allow any Explorer post to accept young women and/or young men, based on the desires of the chartered organization, and many Explorer posts became co-educational.

In the 1970s, some councils were starting Explorer posts that met during high school elective classes, primarily for career exploration classes that featured volunteer speakers representing careers. Because these posts were structurally different, with meetings being adult directed and primarily seminars and the membership being very fluid, the SSA created the membership category of Career Awareness Exploring, and these high school-based posts were moved into this category. Later, when the Learning for Life division was formed, these posts were renamed High School Career Awareness Groups, and moved from Exploring to Learning for Life.

During the 1970s, 1980s, and beyond, Exploring continued to offer the National Explorer Conferences and the Law Enforcement Explorer Conferences, as well as unique programs like the Explorer Mock Trial Competition. Explorers met in area conferences as well. Qualified Explorers were able to run for regional and national Explorer offices, with the National Explorer President and Vice President attending national meetings and participating in the annual Report to the Nation.

On July 30, 1996, the ACLU issued a statement charging that members of Explorer posts affiliated with public services had a significant advantage over non-members in finding employment with these services. Because the BSA prohibited its members from being openly homosexual or atheist, the ACLU believed these public services were discriminating against such people. On April 10, 1997, the ACLU filed a lawsuit against the city of Chicago for allowing these programs. Most of these problematic units were career-awareness posts affiliated with government agencies, especially law enforcement and fire service posts.

In August 1998, the BSA decided to reorganize the Exploring program, and moved all career-oriented Explorer posts to their Learning for Life subsidiary. Those youth and adults continued to be Explorers, but no longer would be members of the BSA. Posts that specialized in outdoor activities (including Sea Scouts, sports, hobbies, and religious activities) were retained in the BSA but moved into the new Venturing Division. Venturers would be able to continue wearing the traditional green uniform shirt and earn BSA awards.

Venturing was launched without some of the test pilot program development that normally was used by the BSA, and some believe this was because of the legal pressures. However, some of the new Venturing program elements (such as the new Silver and Ranger awards) had already been in development for over a year, and were rolled out with the first Venturing program manuals. The name Venturing was chosen since that term was being used for this age group with other national Scout associations.

Since 1998, a number of enhancements to Venturing have been introduced, and the manuals have been updated. Venturers can earn the 5 Bronze Awards (the fifth being Sea Scout), then Gold, then Silver. Additional awards such as the Ranger, Quest and Trust Awards have been added as specialty awards from the Outdoor Bronze, Sports Bronze, and Religious Bronze respectively. New changes in the recognition program are to be expected in May 2014. Leadership training programs for youth include the Introduction to Leadership Skills for Crews (ILSC), National Youth Leadership Training (NYLT), National Advanced Youth Leadership Experience (NAYLE), the new Kodiak Challenge (a combination of the old Kodiak and Kodiak-X programs), and Powder Horn (for both youth and adults)

Venturing, like Exploring, continued the tradition of having national and regional youth presidents. The last elected National Explorer President Jon Fulkerson served in that capacity for a period of two weeks, until August 1, 1998, at which time he became the first national Venturing president. His first term of office was spent promoting the infant program and working on violence prevention programs that have been adopted by the Venturing division. Currently, nominations are solicited for regional presidents, who are selected at the Annual National Meeting of the BSA in May by a subcommittee from the National Venturing Committee. The president is now selected from the pool of the four region presidents of the previous term. Many councils have council level Venturing youth cabinets (which may be called Venturing Officer Associations VOA or Teen Leader Councils) who plan and carry out Venturing events at the Council and District levels.

The BSA currently divides the United States into four regions, West, South, Central, and Northeast. Each of these regions are made up of areas. These areas are further divided in councils, then (sometimes) into districts, then finally crews.

National (President and Vice President) > Regional (full cabinet/VOA) > Area (full cabinet/VOA)> Council (full cabinet VOA) > District (full cabinet VOA) > Crew (full cabinet/VOA)

Council, District, and Crews do not need a 'full cabinet/VOA' to function, especially if the council, District, or Crew does not have a large membership. Many Councils are not further divided into Districts. Council, District, and Crews do not need a 'full cabinet/VOA' to function, especially if the Council, District, or Crew does not have a large membership. Many Councils are not further divided into Districts.

== Sea Scouts ==
The Boy Scouts of America implemented the Sea Scouts program in 1912. The program was basically a nautical/naval program for older youth.

During the early years of the program, the program was poorly defined. Each new national leader made changes.

In 1917, Scouter James "Kimo" Wilder came on board as Chief Seascout. He revamped the program and tried to make it successful. He didn't succeed, so stepped aside in 1923 for Commander Thomas J. Keane. Keane would revamp the Sea Scout program. This is the same basic program that exists today. Keane developed the naval-style uniforms, office title and insignia, four level advancement program of Apprentice, Ordinary, Able, and Quartermaster, and the like.

In 1935, Sea Scouts became part of the larger Senior Scout Division of the BSA. In 1949, Sea Scouts were renamed Sea Explorers, as part of the renaming of Senior Scouts to Explorers. In 1964, minor changes occurred to the Sea Explorer program to more fit with the new Exploring program. Over the years, National stopped promoting the Sea Explorer program. It was only through the dedication of many Sea Scout leaders that the program survived. In 1969, along with Exploring, Sea Explorers became officially coed. In 1998, with the new Venturing program, Sea Explorers returned to their name of Sea Scouts. Also, the program was revitalized and better promoted.
