= Catherine Pollard (Scouting) =

American scoutmaster (1918–2006)

- Born: June 25, 1918
- Died: December 6, 2006 (aged 88)
- Known for: First female scoutmaster in the United States

Catherine "Kay" N. Pollard (June 25, 1918 – December 11, 2006) was the first female Scoutmaster in Scouting America (formerly known as Boy Scouts of America). She led Boy Scout Troop 13 in Milford, Connecticut, from 1973 to 1975 but the BSA refused to recognize her as a Scoutmaster until 1988.

Pollard had tried to register as Scoutmaster in 1974 and 1976. Troop 13 in Milford eventually dissolved when nobody else stepped up to be Scoutmaster. Her 1980s court case was won by the BSA and drew international attention. She had acted as unofficial Scoutmaster for 4 years at that time, but at the insistence of the boys in her troop, she applied to make it official. The Boy Scouts denied her request, saying that she had all the qualifications but lacked the "character" to lead the troop.

In January 1984 the Connecticut Commission on Human Rights and Opportunities ruled she had the right to be a Scoutmaster, but in May 1986 a judge overturned that ruling on the grounds boys needed a male role model and that BSA had the right to make its own rules since it was a private organization. The Connecticut Supreme Court also ruled in favor of the BSA on July 6, 1987 (see Quinnipiac Council, BSA v. Commission on Human Rights and Opportunities, 528 A. 2d 352, 357 (Conn. 1987)).

On February 11, 1988, the Boy Scouts of America abolished gender requirements on all volunteer positions, ending Pollard's 14-year legal battle. Pollard stated: "I do think that this is marvelous," she said at the time, "because there have been women all over the United States, in fact all over the world, that have been doing these things for the Boy Scouts because they could not get a male leader, but we could not get recognition for the things we’ve done." She died on December 13, 2006, in Seminole, Florida, and was buried in Milford.

For her funeral in Milford on December 18, 2006, her casket was carried on a Milford fire truck. She had served the fire department as a volunteer in several positions, including bugler, for many years and when the BSA eventually allowed female Scoutmasters, it was the Milford Fire Department that sponsored a Boy Scout troop so she could be a Scoutmaster.

Pollard's other interests included motorcycling, supporting veteran's issues, bugling, and chicken farming.
