= Scouting in the United States =

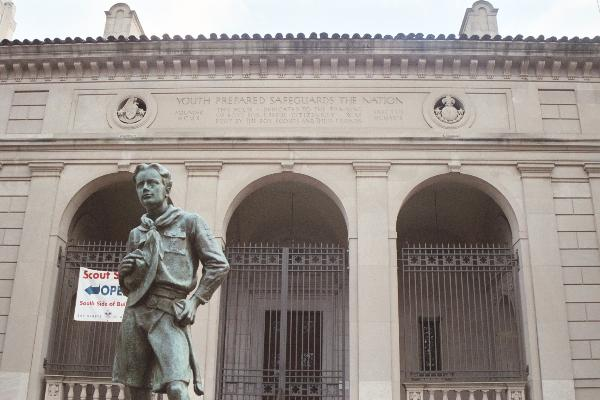
The Ideal Scout, a 1937 statue by R. Tait McKenzie in front of the Bruce S. Marks Scout Resource Center in the Cradle of Liberty Council in Philadelphia

Scouting in the United States is dominated by 1 million-member Scouting America and the Girl Scouts of the USA and other associations that are recognized by one of the international Scouting organizations. Other scouting organizations such as Trail Life USA and American Heritage Girls continue to grow steadily. There are also a few smaller, independent groups that are considered to be "Scout-like" or otherwise Scouting related.

== Scouting for boys ==
=== Origins ===
The progressive movement in the United States was at its height during the early twentieth century. With the migration of families from rural to urban centers, there were concerns among some people that young men were no longer learning patriotism and individualism. Starting in the 1870s, the YMCA was an early promoter of social welfare and other reforms involving young men around a program of mental, physical, social and religious development. Early corn clubs for farm boys began to develop into the 4-H around 1902. In 1896, years before the Scouting movement was founded by Baden-Powell he met the American born Chief of Scouts in British Africa, Frederick Russell Burnham, and learned from him the fundamentals of scouting, inspiring him and giving him the plan for the program and the code of honor of Scouting for Boys, and thus restoring the old traditions of American Youth.

Ernest Thompson Seton started the Woodcraft Indians in 1902 and published The Birch Bark Roll of the Woodcraft Indians in 1906. Daniel Carter Beard started the Sons of Daniel Boone in 1905. When Baden-Powell created the first Scouting program in 1907, he used elements of Setons' work in his Scouting for Boys. Several small local Scouting programs started in the U.S. soon after, most notably the Boy Scouts of the United States (BSUS), the National Scouts of America (NSA) and the Peace Scouts of California—these later merged into the BSA soon after it was formed. The Southern Baptist Convention's Royal Ambassadors was founded in 1908 for elementary-school-aged boys. The YMCA in Michigan was organizing Scout troops based on Scouting for Boys as early as 1909. Salvation Army founder William Booth met with Baden-Powell for discussion about a possible Salvationist Scouting program. The Salvation Army thus began its Life Saving Scouts of the World in 1913. The BSUS was started by the National Highway Protective Association and led by Peter S. Bomus. William Verbeck, Adjutant General of New York State, was leader of the National Scouts. Both the BSUS and NSA were both more military in style.

Chicago publisher W. D. Boyce was visiting London, England in 1909 where he met the Unknown Scout and learned of the Scouting movement. Boyce secured the rights to the Scouting program in the U.S., and soon after his return, Boyce incorporated the Boy Scouts of America on February 8, 1910. Edgar M. Robinson and Lee F. Hanmer became interested in the nascent BSA movement and convinced Boyce to turn the program over to the YMCA for development. Robinson enlisted Seton, Beard and other prominent leaders in the early youth movements. After initial development, Robinson turned the movement over to James E. West who became the first Chief Scout Executive and the Scouting movement began to expand in the U.S.

Other Scouting organizations were also started around 1910 and continued for some time. These include the American Boy Scouts, the Polish National Alliance Scouts of Chicago, and the Rhode Island Scouts, the YMMIA Scouts of the Church of Jesus Christ of Latter-day Saints (formed November 29, 1911 merged May 21, 1913), United Boys' Brigade of America's Scout program and California Boy Scouts. The American Boy Scouts were organized by William Randolph Hearst in May and June 1910 but by the end of the year Hearst had left followed by the New England Department as the New England Boy Scouts and the following year the Rhode Island Boy Scouts.

Other groups used the Scout name, but did not provide the Scouting program. Colonel Cody's Boy Scouts were formed in 1909 and continue as the American Cadet Alliance. The Michigan Forest Scouts were organized in 1911 as auxiliaries for forest fire service and was a model copied by New York. These Forest Scouts were considered affiliated with the BSA.

The ABS changed their name to the United States Boy Scouts in 1913 after pressure from the BSA.

Boyce created the Lone Scouts of America in 1915 and merged them into the BSA in 1924. The Boy Rangers of America, an organization for younger boys, was created with help from the BSA and mainly merged in 1930.

Seton restarted Woodcraft after departing from the BSA in 1915, but the program faded after his death in 1946. After helping to create the BSA and seeing it grow into a successful rival, the YMCA began the Indian Guides in 1926 using some of Seton's material.

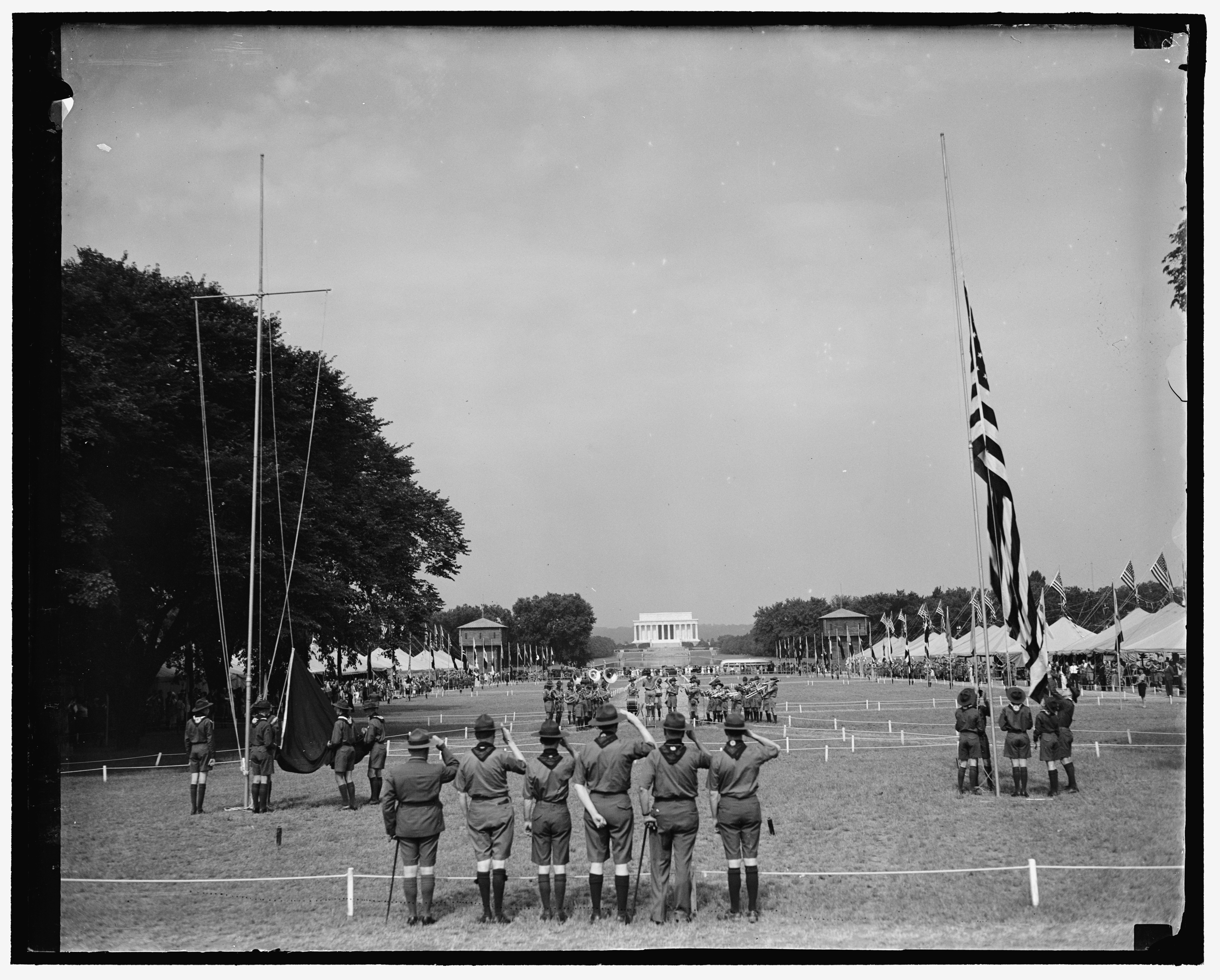
The opening ceremonies of the first National Scout Jamboree of the Boy Scouts of America, held in 1937 on the National Mall in Washington, D.C.

After the U.S. Supreme Court upheld the BSA's rights to the "Scouting" service mark, several Scouting organizations were forced to change their names. In 1918, the Life Saving Scouts changed its name to LifeSaving Guards-Boys which led to many Life Saving units transferring to the BSA. LifeSaving Guards leader began to press for affiliation with the BSA. United States Boy Scouts then changed its name to American Cadets in 1919. The ABS survived for a few more years under various names before fading away.

The Columbian Squires, run by the Knights of Columbus were formed in 1925. In 1929, a special charter was granted to the Life Saving Guards-Boys from the BSA to join the two organizations together.

John F. Kennedy was the first president to have been a Boy Scout.

In the 1930s, a leader in the Church of the Nazarene launched Boy's Works and Girl's Work in the church's Southern California district, which pick it up as a district wide program in 1934. While another set of Caravan forerunner programs, "Bluebirds" for young children and "Pioneers" for older children were also developed and promoted by a minister and an Eagle Scout. All Nazarene Scouting organizations were merged into Caravan in 1946.

=== Further history ===
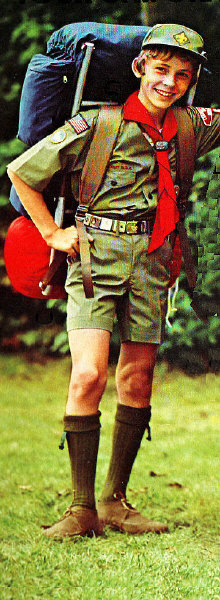
Boy Scout, 1974, wearing uniform of the time

The Calvinist Cadet Corps was officially founded in 1952 in Christian Reformed Church in North America. The Royal Rangers was founded in 1962 as a program of the Assemblies of God.

In 1975, the Camp Fire Girls of America changed its membership policy to being co-ed and its name to Camp Fire.

In 2001, SpiralScouts International was formed at the Wiccan Aquarian Tabernacle Church in Index, Washington. Although it serves a Wiccan community, it is open to members of any faith or no faith. The group is small and co-ed, claiming a membership of 150 adult volunteers and 350 scouts in 2013. With BSA membership controversies, the SpiralScouts offered their highest rank to those Eagle Scouts that turn in their badges to the BSA in protest.

In 2003, a Boy Scouts troop in New York City's East Harlem neighborhood and sponsored by the Unitarian Church of All Souls broke away from the BSA over the exclusionary membership policies to start the Navigators USA, a co-ed scouting group.

In 2008, the Baden-Powell Service Association was found after a Cub Scout Pack leader, David Atchley, in Washington, Missouri fought over adopting a nondiscrimination policy for the pack. The group reported 19 units in 2013.

== Scouting for girls ==
=== Origins ===
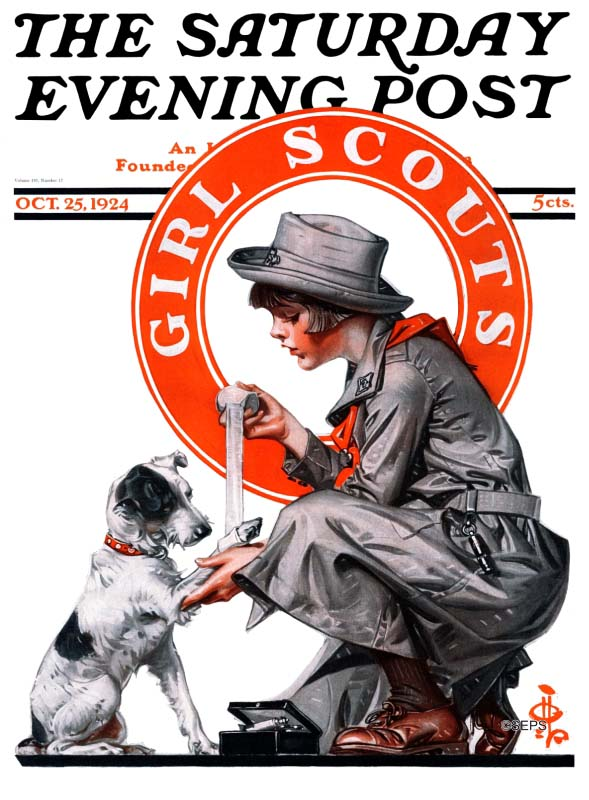
Cover story from The Saturday Evening Post on the Girl Scouts (25 Oct 1924)

Scouting for girls began when the Camp Fire Girls were incorporated in 1910 with help from the BSA. Again, Seton's influence was established with the use of his awards scheme and Indian ceremonies.

Other local girls groups formed in 1910, including Girl Scouts in Des Moines, Iowa and Girl Guides formed by David W. Ferry in Spokane, Washington. In 1911, these two groups planned to merge with the Camp Fire Girls and form the Girl Pioneers of America, but relationships fractured and the merger failed. Grace Seton quit the group over the reject of her committee's draft of a handbook followed by Linda Beard in September 1911 over difference with the Gulicks. However, there was an organizational meeting held by Lina Beard on February 7, 1912, in Flushing, New York of a Girl Pioneers of America group. Lord Baden-Powell had authorized an American version of the Girl Guides manual through the Henry Holt Publishing Company, who then approached Lina Beard to write the manual.

The Girl Guides of America, later the Girl Scouts of the United States and finally the Girl Scouts of the USA (GSUSA), were founded by Juliette Gordon Low in 1912 and were granted a congressional charter on March 16, 1950. They are a youth organization for girls in the United States and American girls living abroad. Founded by Juliette Gordon Low in 1912, it was organized after Low met Robert Baden-Powell, the founder of Scouting, in 1911. Upon returning to Savannah, Georgia, she telephoned a distant cousin, saying, "I've got something for the girls of Savannah, and all of America, and all the world, and we're going to start it tonight!"

Membership is organized according to grade, with activities designed for each level. The GSUSA is a member of the World Association of Girl Guides and Girl Scouts (WAGGGS). A 1994 Chronicle of Philanthropy poll showed that the Girl Scouts was ranked by the public as the eighth "most popular charity/non-profit in America" of over 100 charities. It describes itself as "the world's preeminent organization dedicated solely to girls".

== Scouting today ==
The main national Scouting organizations in the U.S. are the Boy Scouts of America and the Girl Scouts of the USA. The BSA is a member of the World Organization of the Scout Movement while the GSUSA is a member of the World Association of Girl Guides and Girl Scouts, the two main international Scouting associations. "Scouting" in the United States is the exclusive trademark of the Boy Scouts of America. On February 18, 2020, the Boy Scouts of America filed for a Chapter 11 financial restructuring due to sex abuse lawsuits.

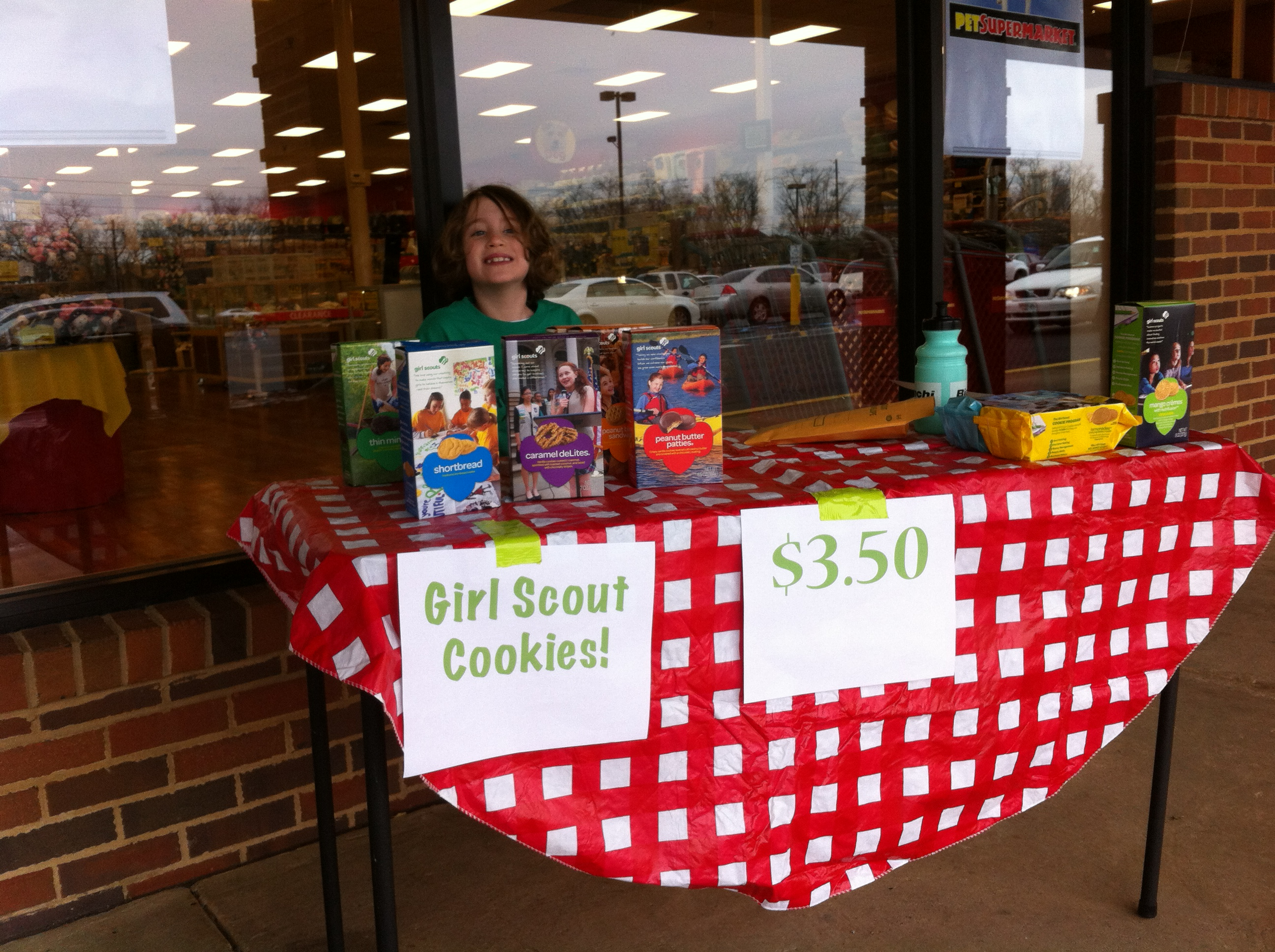
A girl selling Girl scout cookies

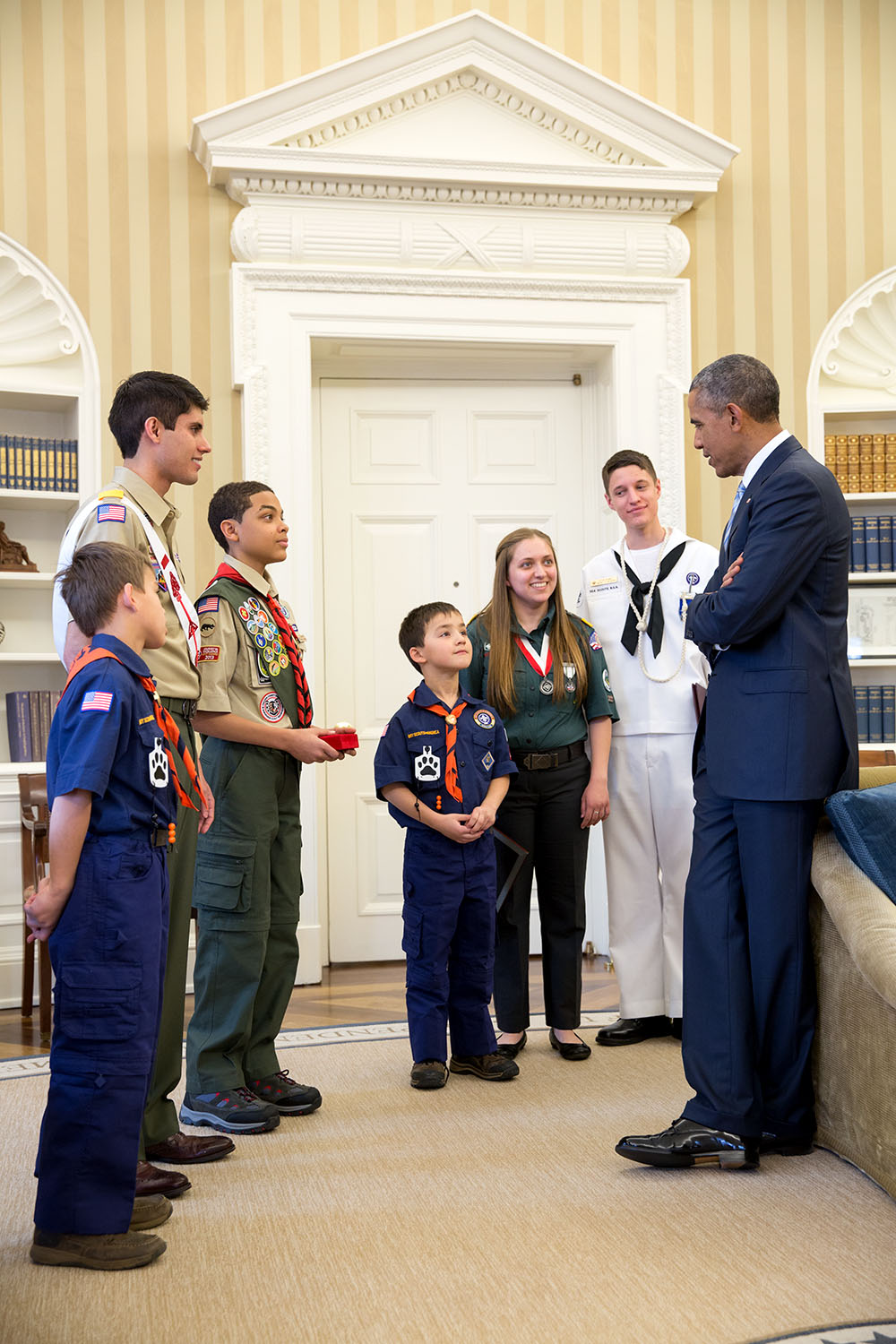
President Barack Obama Greets the Boy Scouts of America in the Oval Office, 2015

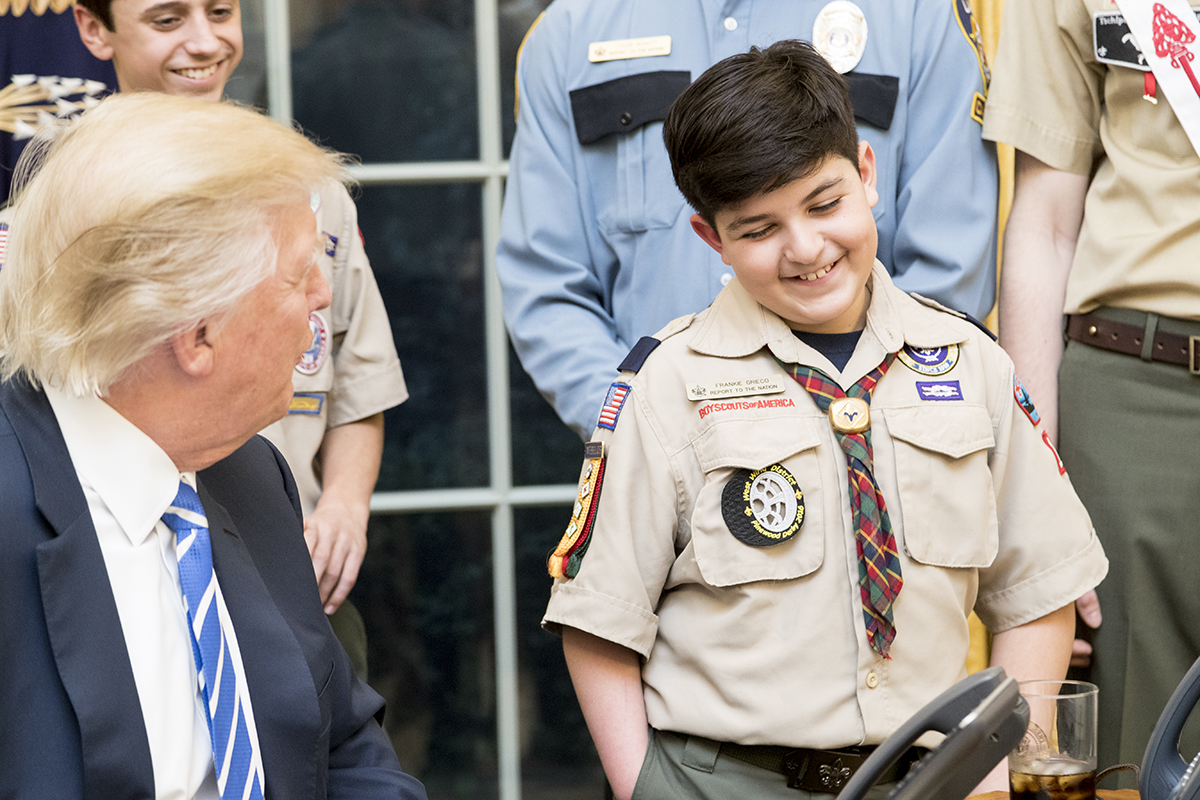
US President Donald Trump with a member of the Boy Scouts of America in the White House, 2017

There are a number of other youth programs in the U.S. that are not recognized by any international Scouting associations, but use many methods of Scouting. Some of these programs are explicitly religious, while others are breakaway organizations which disagree with the policies of the BSA and GSUSA.

The International Scout and Guide Fellowship is an alumni association open to former members of the World Association of Girl Guides and Girl Scouts, the World Organization of the Scout Movement and to adults who believe in the Scouting ideals; the ISGF has a number of members in the U.S.

Navigators USA is an American non-aligned Scouting organization. It has over 90 affiliated chapters in the United States and the United Kingdom.

The Baden-Powell Scouts' Association, a UK Scouting organization and part of the World Federation of Independent Scouts, have had a small presence in the U.S. since 1998.

In 2006, the Baden Powell Scouts were formed, operating groups in Florida, Missouri and Connecticut, with lone Scouts supported by them in 12 states. They are members of WFIS and claim to be affiliated to the "Baden-Powell Scouts' Association of England".

The Canada-based Federation of North-American Explorers (FNE) — a candidate association of the International Union of Guides and Scouts of Europe — has 19 active groups in the US, the oldest of which is the North Star Group located in the Philadelphia area.

The Israeli Scouts Movement operates 18 units in the U.S. and one in Canada to reach out to Israeli youth and operates a special programme for reimigration to Israel.

=== Scouts-in-Exile ===
The Związek Harcerstwa Polskiego (Polish Scouting Association) also has some presence in the U.S. Külföldi Magyar Cserkészszövetség (Hungarian Scout Association in Exteris) has also some presence in the U.S. There are also some other Scouts-in-Exile groups in the U.S.: Organization of Russian Young Pathfinders, Latvian, Lithuanian Estonian and Ukrainian groups. Some of them are also members of the Boy Scouts of America.

=== Scout-like organizations ===
- Royal Ambassadors is an elementary school aged program run by the Southern Baptist Convention's Women's Missionary Union.
- Challengers is a teen aged program of the Southern Baptist Convention.
- The Royal Rangers was founded in 1962 as a program of the Assemblies of God.
- Pathfinders are a community service oriented uniformed youth organization of the Seventh-day Adventist Church.
- Calvinist Cadet Corps was officially founded in 1952 in Reformed Christian churches.
- Its sister organization, GEMS Girls' Clubs (formerly, "Calvinettes") was formed in 1957.
- Awana is an international evangelical youth organization founded in 1950.
- Some small elements of Seton's Woodcraft program survive as the Woodcraft Rangers.

After much success, the YMCA Indian Guides program declined until it was dissolved in 2001 and reformed as the YMCA Adventure Guides, no longer using American Indian themes. The Indian Guides program was reformed outside the YMCA as the Native Sons and Daughters in 2002.

The Camp Fire Girls are now a co-ed organization known as Camp Fire with about 300,000 youth members.

Another Scout-like organization is the Club de Exploradores with groups in the United States, Mexico, Peru and Uruguay.

=== Breakaway organizations ===
- The American Heritage Girls is a Christian Scouting group formed in 1995 by a group of parents who were unhappy that the Girl Scouts accepted lesbians as troop leaders, allowed girls to substitute another word more applicable to their belief for "God" in the promise, and allegedly banned prayer at meetings. The group currently has troops in many states of the continental United States; membership as of 2012 is about 28,000 girls in 45 states.
- Trail Life USA is a Christian Scouting group formed in September 2013 in reaction to the BSA's decision to cease its exclusion of openly gay youth from membership.
- Frontier Girls is a scouting style program for girls that focuses on life skills, patriotism, community service, and a love of learning serving girls ages 3 through adult. Membership as of 2016 is about 2,500 girls in 47 states.
- SpiralScouts International

Other new organizations with inclusive policies include:

- Navigators USA, also co-ed
- Outdoor Service Guides, also co-ed (formerly Baden-Powell Service Association)
- Adventure Scouts USA (formerly StarScouting America),
- Earth Champs
- Kids for Earth

=== Alternative programs ===
In response to the BSA membership policies that limit participation by girls and avowed homosexuals, and exclude atheists, agnostics, some youth organizations using Scouting principles have formed.

The BSA converted its In School Scouting program to Learning for Life in 1992. LFL uses no Scout emblems and has no policies on religion, gender or sexuality. The BSA's career-oriented Exploring program was moved to LFL in 1998.

== Scouting-related organizations ==
There are several organizations related to but not part of any Scouting organizations.

Alpha Phi Omega is a co-ed service fraternity organized to provide community service, leadership development, and social opportunities. It was founded by students who were former Boy Scouts and Scouters as a way to continue participating in the ideals of Scouting at the college level. Epsilon Tau Pi is fraternity whose membership is open only to Eagle Scouts.

Scouting for All and The Inclusive Scouting Network were formed to promote tolerance and diversity within the BSA in the face of its policies that excluded non-theists and "open or avowed" homosexuals from membership or leadership positions. ScoutPride is a similar organization. Scouting for All appears to have been mostly inactive since around 2009 as evidenced by the last copyright day on the now offline website and referencing a March 3, 2009 Fox News article as its Latest News.

In response to opposition to the BSA's policies, several organizations were formed to support the BSA. These included now-defunct organizations such as the American Civil Rights Union's Scouting Legal Defense Fund, and Save Our Scouts.

There are several organizations that offer resources for Scouting—the U.S. Scouting Service Project is one of the largest.

== See also ==
- American Scouting overseas
- History of the Boy Scouts of America
- USA age groups in Scouting
- Defunct Scout and Scout-like organizations in the United States
