= Defunct Scout and Scout-like organizations in the United States =

Besides the Boy Scouts of America (BSA) and Girl Scouts of the USA, both of which still exist, there were other Scouting and Scout-like organizations that arose over the years in the United States. Many are now defunct, including these examples.

== Bee-Hive Girls ==
Bee-Hive Girls
- Owner: Young Ladies’ Mutual Improvement Association (The Church of Jesus Christ of Latter-day Saints)
- Age range: Various age ranges
- Founded: 1915

Bee-Hive Girls was the Scout-like program for girls run by the Young Ladies’ Mutual Improvement Association (YLMIA) of the Church of Jesus Christ of Latter Day Saints (Mormons).

Initial in 1913, the Ensign Stake YLMIA and Box Elder YLMIA used some portions of Camp Fire Girls' and Girl Guides' programs respectively. The Church indicated to Dr. Luther H. Gulick, the Camp Fire Girls founder, that it would not be officially involved with them, for a number of reasons related to the need of the Stake and General Boards to administrate all activities. Despite this, Dr. Gulick still met with a Bee-Hive committee representative with welcoming attitude. The Bee-Hive Girls was officially founded in 1915.

For its Silver Jubilee Year, a year's worth of activities were planned for 1940 under General Bee-Hive Committee led by chairman Ileen Ann Waspe. In May 1943, the Bee-Hive Girls was reported to have 20,000 members.

For the organization's war time efforts starting in June 1943, Bee-Hive War Emergency (BHWE) Swarms were formed of all three levels in each ward under one of the Bee Keepers so as to efficiently handle these efforts. Special honor badges were issued for each 12 hours of war time work. Earning three such honor badges, or 36 hours of war service, earn the girl a BHWE pin. 900 BHWE pins were issued by May 1, 1943.

Bee-Hive Girls were organized into Swarms for each level in a stake which were headed by a Bee Keepers. Busy Bee Girl Characters of the program included Commando Rosy-Bee-Ready.

== Girl Scouts of America ==
Girl Scouts of America
- Headquarters: Des Moines, Iowa
- Founded: 1910
- Founder: Clara A. Lisetor-Lane

Girl Scouts of America (GSA) was an early girl Scouting organization that operated starting in 1910.

The Girl Scouts of America was established in Des Moines, Iowa by Clara A. Lisetor-Lane in 1910. In 1911, the GSA and the Girl Guides (Spokane, Washington) planned to merge with the Camp Fire Girls to form the Girl Pioneers of America, but relationships fractured and the merger failed. That year, Lisetor-Lane had published her group's manual based on the Girl Guides handbook.

Juliette Gordon Low attempted in 1913 to merge the Girl Scouts of the USA with the GSA. With the groups' similarities, Low thought this would be easy, but Lisetor-Lane felt Low copycatted her organization and threatened a lawsuit. With Low's group's growth, Lisetor-Lane thought that Low used underhanded tactics to lure troops away. The GSA never grew beyond a few troops as Lisetor-Lane had limited social connections and no financial resources to grow the organization on a national level. The GSA eventually died out.

== Boy Scouts of the United States ==
Boy Scouts of the United States
- Owner: National Highway Protective Association
- Founded: May 5, 1910
- Defunct: 1910
- Founders: E.S. Cornell; Peter S. Bomus
- Chief Scout: Peter S. Bomus

Boy Scouts of the United States (BSUS) was a boys Scouting organization that operated in 1910. It was formed by the National Highway Protective Association on May 5, 1910, by Colonel E.S. Cornell, association secretary, and Colonel Peter S. Bomus, with Bomus heading up the program. Troops were to be operational by mid-summer 1910 on a small scale. Edward L. Rowan in "To Do My Best" indicated that Colonel E.S. Cornell had formed the National Highway Patrol Association Scouts. BSUS soon merged with the Boy Scouts of America with Bomus becoming a member of the National Council and National Scout Commissioner.

In addition to the Boy Scout program of Baden-Powell, the BSUS troops were to advocate for good roads, drilled in a military style and study the nation's topography.

== LifeSaving Guards-Boys ==
LifeSaving Guards-Boys
- Owner: The Salvation Army
- Founded: 1913
- Founder: William Booth

The LifeSaving Guards-Boys, or the Life Saving Scouts of the World, was a Boy Scouting organization that operated starting in 1910.

Salvation Army founder William Booth met with Baden-Powell for discussion about a possible Salvationist Scouting program. The Salvation Army thus began its Life Saving Scouts of the World in 1913 for boys and in 1915 a parallel organisation, Life-Saving Guards, for girls. After the U.S. Supreme Court upheld the BSA's rights to the "Scouting" service mark, several Scouting organizations were forced to change their names. In 1918, the Life Saving Scouts changed its name to LifeSaving Guards-Boys which led to many Life Saving units transferring to the BSA. LifeSaving Guards-Boys leader began to press for affiliation with the BSA. In 1929, a special charter was granted to the Life Saving Guards-Boys from the BSA to join the two organizations together.

== See also ==
- American Boy Scouts, main competing organization to the Boy Scouts of America in the 1910s
- Woodcraft Indians, a precursor organization to Boy Scouts
- Sons of Daniel Boone, a precursor organization to Boy Scouts
- Boy Rangers of America, a younger boys organization that merged with the BSA to become Cub Scouting
- Lone Scouts of America
- Medical Cadet Corps
- Rhode Island Boy Scouts, state charter alternative to the BSA
- New England Boy Scouts, a regional offshoot of the American Boy Scouts
