= Camporee =

Gathering of Scouting units

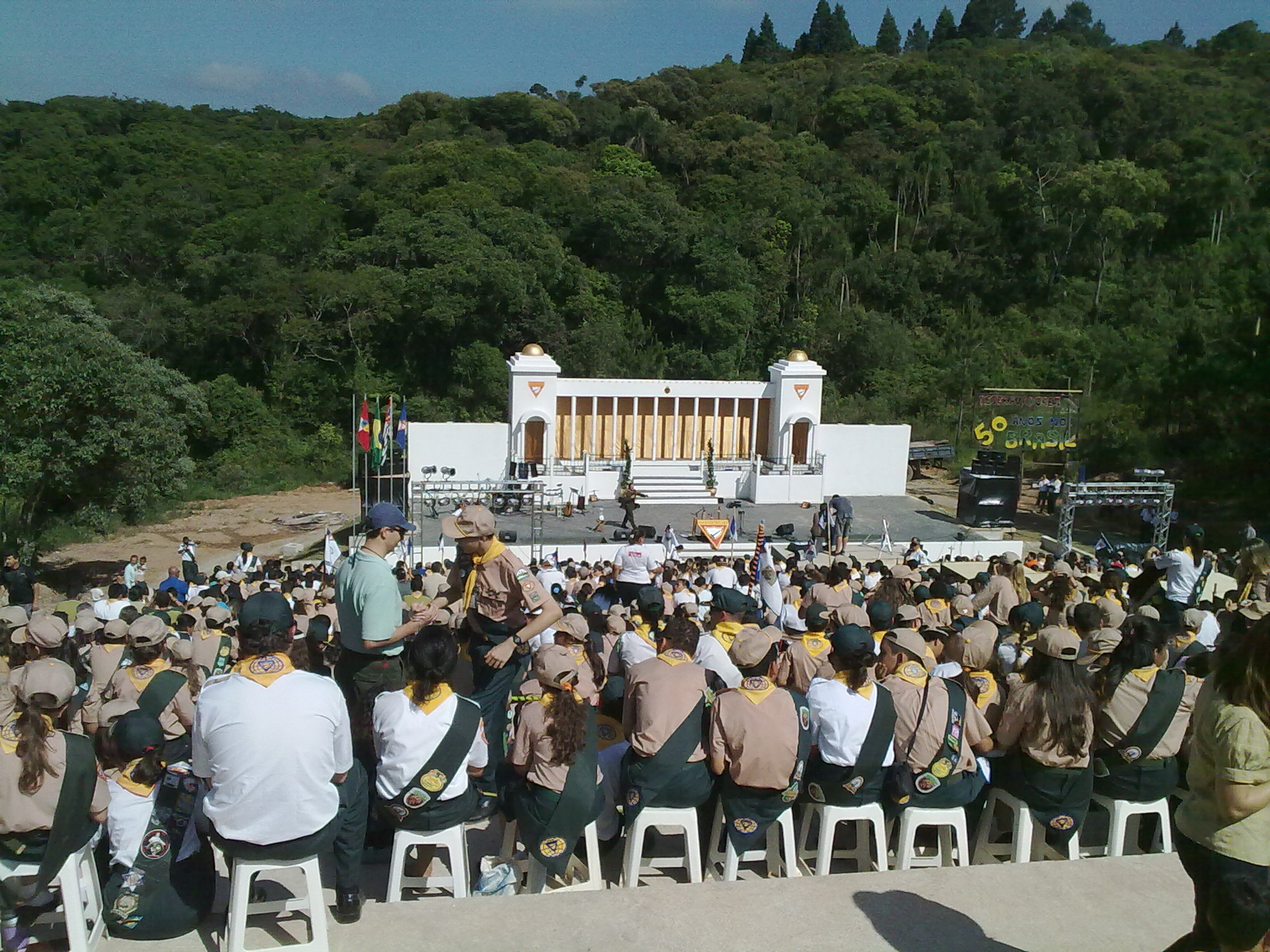
- Pathfinder Camporee in the state of São Paulo, Brazil

A camporee is a local or regional gathering of Scouting units for a period of camping and common activities. Similar to a camporee, a jamboree occurs less often and draws units from the entire nation or world. It should not be confused with the Australian term "jamborette".

== Scouting America ==
In Scouting America, districts or councils may hold a camporee once or twice a year. Typically, the camporee involves patrol-based competitions, with events such as: hiking preparedness, fire building, knot tying, first aid, emergency preparedness, pioneering, citizenship, patrol mystery event (team building), outdoor cooking, camping or orienteering. Some camporees also integrate work on merit badges. The camporee may be centered on a central theme such as living history, horsemanship, aquatics, shooting sports, a historical trail, a service project, and most recently Geocaching. Camporees often have a campfire program with awards and presentations, skits and songs. Camporees also may have a service project that helps the hosting facility. Typical service projects could be pruning trees, spreading mulch, clearing brush, trail repair, tree planting or trash pick up.

The scouts usually camp, compete and cook by patrol. The patrol will have a patrol name, patrol flag, patrol cheer or yell and a patrol leader. Patrols are usually made of six to eight scouts, a patrol duty roster is made and posted so patrol responsibilities are rotated, like: head cook, assistant cook, cleanup, KP, fire builder, and water duty.

Councils sometime use the term camporall, Scout show, or scoutoree for a council level camporee, or they may use a unique name. A Scoutorama is a show of Scouting activities, when combined with a camporee; it may be called a camporama. In some southern councils Scoutorama is replaced by "Scout Show". $2 Tickets or $10 discount card are sold by units to promote Scout Show to the public, and to help raise money for individual units.

The Order of the Arrow is the national honor society of the Scouting America, which is a recognized group of scouts that have displayed high enthusiasm and performed at high skill throughout their scouting careers. The Order of the Arrow often helps hold the event or will be leaders for part of the event, like the campfire or hike in. In doing so this gives older Scouts new leader opportunities.

== Girl Scouts of the USA ==
It is common for Girl Scouts to have camporees as well. Sometimes Girl Scout camporees are hosted by council or individual troop leaders, but camporees are frequently hosted by older Girl Scouts.

The campers attending a camporee are usually between the ages of six and ten when they are old enough to be away from their home and family for a weekend, but too young to go camping on their own. Activities at a Girl Scout camporee are oriented towards building character and leadership, while having fun and helping the community at the same time. They might include: earning a patch or badge verifying that they improved skills in a certain area, playing a variety of games, having a traditional bonfire with skits and snacks, and doing a community service project.

== Pathfinders ==
Pathfinder camporees are sponsored by the Seventh-day Adventist Church. They are organized around large camps, often in parks or land granted by the town hall or host of the event. At these camporees, the Pathfinders camp out and participate in activities such as: competitions for music and Bible knowledge, parades (similar to military parades), and sometimes socio-environmental activities involving the entire local community. The camporee usually ends with an award ceremony based on each of the clubs' performance. The main goal of the camporee is for the Adventist youth to have a closer relationship with God.

The Pathfinder Club also promotes large camps called "camporees". These camporees are divided into five levels: Area, Conference, Union, Division and International (previously held in Oshkosh, Wisconsin every five years, now in Gillette, Wyoming). The camporees are the biggest events of interaction between Pathfinder clubs around the world.

The younger sibling to the Pathfinder Club known as the Adventurers Club also conducts periodic camporees.
