= GEMS Girls' Clubs =

GEMS Girls' Clubs is a non-denominational, non-profit, Christian organization that seeks to equip women and girls to live radically faithful lives for Christ. Clubs are established in churches and other Christian organizations and allow women to mentor girls as they develop a living, dynamic relationship with Jesus. GEMS, which stands for "Girls Everywhere Meeting the Savior", was founded in 1958 in Grand Rapids, Michigan, by Barbara Vredevoogd and has since grown to become an international ministry with 5,200 women serving over 23,000 girls in more than 800 clubs in the United States, Canada, Zambia, Kenya, Australia, New Zealand, Uganda, South Africa, Zimbabwe.

== History ==
In 1957, the Young Calvinist Federation decided there was a mounting need to design a ministry specifically for young girls. Barb Vredevoogd, a member of Beverly Christian Reformed Church in Wyoming, Michigan, was invited to expand the club program she had designed for local girls, in order to offer the curriculum to other churches as well. Vredevoogd then became the first acting director, and the program – originally known as Calvinettes – began to flourish.

In 1966, GEMS (then "Calvinettes"), the Calvinist Cadet Corps, and ThereforeGo (then the Young Calvinist Federation) merged to form Dynamic Youth Ministries (then known as United Calvinist Youth).

In 2023, GEMS Girls' Clubs became a D.B.A. under the ownership of GEMS Global, a 501(c)3 nonprofit organization. GEMS Global is governed by a board of directors that oversees general policies, finances, and the overall effectiveness of the ministry.

== Magazines ==
In the past, GEMS Girls' Clubs produced two magazines that help girls recognize and embrace their potential to be world changers. No new magazines have been published since December 2021.

=== SHINE brightly ===
Published monthly from September through May, SHINE brightly is for girls ages nine to fourteen. Each issue contains three Bible lessons as well as articles and stories that inspire girls to be activists for Christ. The magazine is designed to help girls see how God is at work in their lives and in the world around them.

=== Sparkle ===
Produced monthly from October through March, Sparkle is designed for girls in grades 1-3. Through Bible lessons, articles, stories, and games, it seeks to show girls how they can make a difference in the world.

== Leadership training ==
A crucial aspect of the GEMS ministry is giving women the tools they need to effectively reach out to the girls in their local clubs. Volunteer leaders (counselors) are offered training opportunities in which they learn how to use the GEMS curricula as well as gain important insights into the development stages of the age group they are teaching. These training events are all designed to equip and encourage counselors in their work with girls.

== Accountability ==
GEMS Girls' Clubs is a member of the Evangelical Council for Financial Accountability. Members of the ECFA must adhere to standards of responsible stewardship including high standards of accountability in fundraising, financial disclosure, confidentiality of donor information, and the use of resources. The ministry submits to an annual independent audit.
