= ThereforeGo Ministries =

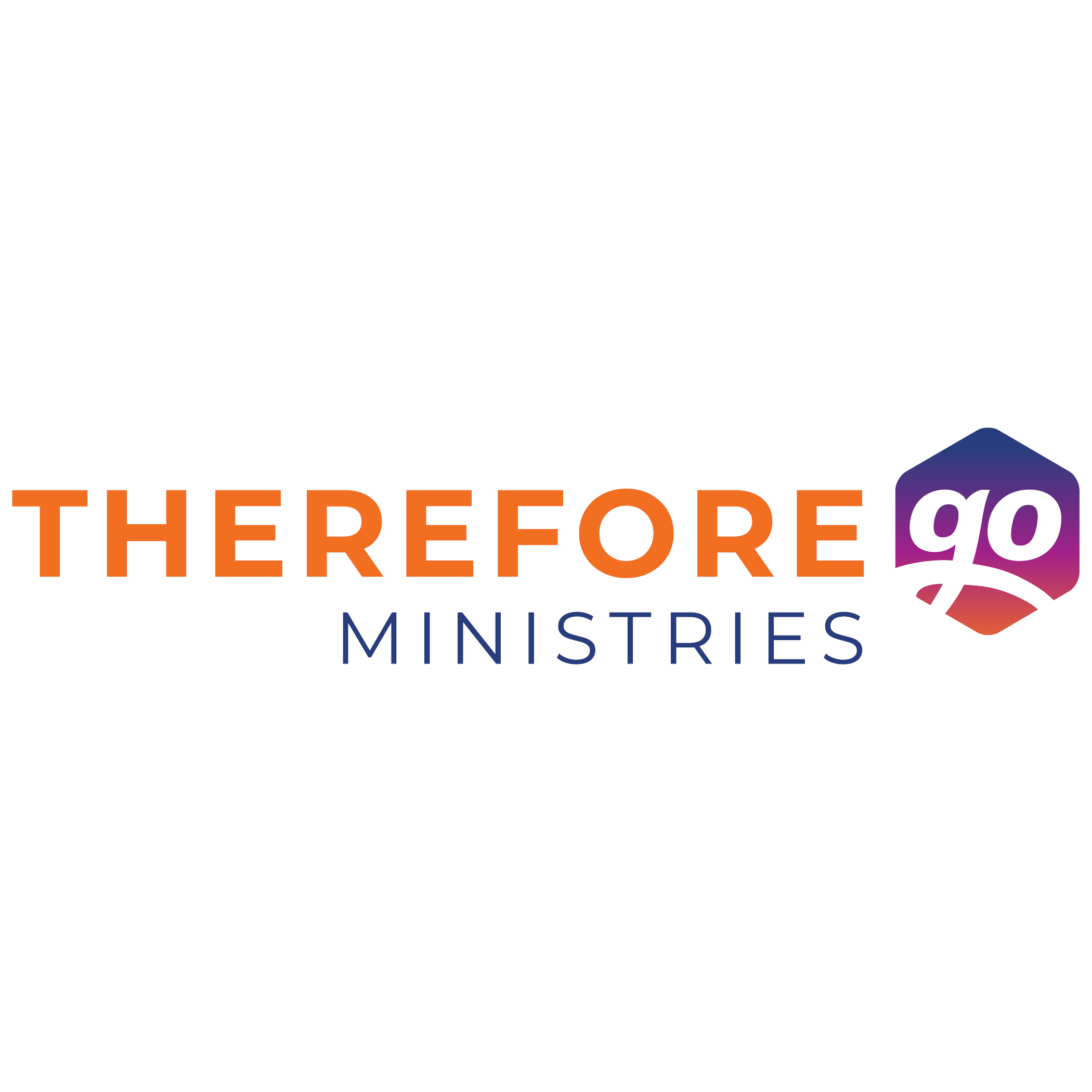
- Predecessor: Youth Unlimited
- Formation: September 1919
- Type: INGO
- Purpose: ThereforeGo Ministries helps churches challenge youth and emerging adults to commit their lives to Jesus Christ and transform this world for him.
- Headquarters: 4695 44th St SE, Suite 130, Kentwood, MI, 49512
- Region served: United States and Canada
- Members: Youth; Evangelical Council for Financial Accountability; Standards of Excellence in Short-Term Mission (SOE)
- Official language: English
- Parent organization: Dynamic Youth Ministries
- Affiliations: Calvinist Cadet Corps
- Website: www.thereforego.com
- Formerly called: American Federation of Reformed Young Men's Societies; American Federation of Reformed Young Women’s Society; Young Calvinist League; Young Calvinist Federation

ThereforeGo Ministries (formerly known as Youth Unlimited, the American Federation of Reformed Young Men's Societies, the Young Calvinist League, and then the Young Calvinist Federation) is a Christian youth ministry for short-term mission trips in the United States and Canada that was formed in September 1919. The organization is a non-denominational ministry that has its roots in the Christian Reformed Church in North America, but partners with other Christian denominations. ThereforeGo is a member of the Evangelical Council for Financial Accountability (ECFA) and Standards of Excellence in Short-Term Mission (SOE). It is one of two youth ministries under the Dynamic Youth Ministries umbrella organization, with the Calvinist Cadet Corps.

The non-profit is mainly known for its "SERVE" mission trips for teens, which are 5-7 day trips for middle school and high school age students, which are mostly made up of youth groups from various churches. The volunteers participate in a variety of community service projects in the host church's community. A small sample of these service projects includes that in 1998, the Ellensburg, Washington chapter of the organization spent three days removing graffiti from various parts of the city. In 2014, student teams did various service projects throughout Chicago, Illinois as part of The Chicago Project. In 2016, volunteers painted houses around Sioux City, Iowa.

== History ==
In August 1950, the organization, which was then called the Young Calvinist Federation (YCF), released a report calling for the institution of educational programs and legislative programmes in order to afford African Americans "rights and opportunities equal to those enjoyed by other members of society."

The American Federation of Reformed Young Women's Societies, which was founded in May 1932, merged into the YCF in December 1955. In August 1967, the YCF held an international convention in Edmonton, Alberta. From December 30, 1982, until January 2, 1983, the YCF co-sponsored a conference with members of local churches in Calgary. The name of the organization changed to Youth Unlimited (YU) in 1992 and to ThereforeGo Ministries in 2020.
