= Calvinist Cadet Corps =

Reformed Christian organization

The Calvinist Cadet Corps (CCC) is a non-denominational, non-profit Reformed Christian organization that equips men to mentor boys. The ministry establishes clubs primarily in churches. Clubs meet weekly or biweekly and participate in Bible study, crafts, projects, games, and merit badge achievement programs that explore a boy’s specific interest areas. Outside of the club meetings the members participate in church and community service projects, camping, and other outdoor adventure opportunities. The organization also sponsors a triennial international camporee which is a week-long wilderness camping experience. The event typically draws more than 1200 men and boys.

The Cadet Corps was founded in 1952 in Grand Rapids, Michigan, now the home of the organizational office. As of 2010 it serves 4,000 men and 18,000 boys in approximately 600 clubs in the United States, Canada, Kenya, and Uganda. The organization also shares materials and information with Cadet clubs in New Zealand and a brother organization, the Christian Cadet Corps, in Australia.

The CCC is associated with the GEMS Girls' Clubs (a sister organization) and with ThereforeGo Ministries in the umbrella organization Dynamic Youth Ministries.

== History ==
In the late 1940s and early 1950s several churches in the Grand Rapids, Michigan area that were affiliated with the Christian Reformed denomination were sponsoring boys' clubs. A Boy’s Club Leaders Federation was formed in Grand Rapids in January 1952 to unify activities within these boys' clubs, and give direction to further development. The result of several meetings in the following months was the adoption of a constitution on October 16, 1952. This date is recognized as the formal creation of the organization that would eventually be named the Calvinist Cadet Corps.

In early 1953 the organization had a membership of 30 clubs providing a ministry for boys ages 9 – 12 years. By the end of 1954 the Calvinist Cadet Corps was adopted as the official name for the organization. The organization began publishing materials needed to support the ministry — the first Cadet Guidebook in 1954, one year later the first Clarion Newsletter for counselors, and in 1958 the Crusader Magazine for boys (now Cadet Quest).

By the mid 1960s the organization had 330 clubs, a catalog of materials (guidebooks, badges, and uniform supplies), and it held its first international camporee in Colorado. In 1966, the Calvinist Cadet Corps, the Calvinettes (later known as the GEMS girls clubs), and the Young Calvinist Federation (later known as Youth Unlimited and later ThereforeGo Ministries) merged to form the United Calvinist Youth (later known as the Dynamic Youth Ministries).

During the 1970s and 1980s the Cadet ministry expanded to add three more programs. For older boys, grades 7 & 8, there was the Guide Trails program, and Voyageurs for boys in grades 9 and above. For younger boys, grades 1 – 3, the Junior Cadet program was established.

Most of the 600 clubs that make up the organization are located in the United States and Canada. In past decades there were periodic Cadet ministries in Asia and Europe. As of 2010, the Cadet organization supports several clubs in Kenya and Uganda.

== Governance ==
The Calvinist Cadet Corps is governed by the annual board meeting known as "congress". Congress brings 100 counselors, on average, from all over North America to a three-day decision-making meeting. The men who come to congress (known as congressmen) serve as representatives of their councils. Congressmen also appoint six members to an executive committee, and it is this committee that oversees the day-to-day operations of the organization.

At a local level Councils, groups of Cadet clubs in geographical proximity to each other, are used to further foster the group's mission. These local units sponsor regular multi-club activities such as field days, rocket launches, and pine wood derby races. Currently, there are 43 councils operating within the United States and Canada. Many of these, 24 to be exact, are concentrated in Michigan and nearby parts of Ontario, Canada, reflecting the program's origin in this area. Some, such as the Southern California and Pacific Sierra councils, represent geographically large areas, while others are more closely connected.

== Program levels ==
The two program levels that are most common in sponsoring churches are the "Junior Cadet" program and the "Recruit, Pathfinder, Builder" program. The CCC offers two programs for older boys, Guide Trails and Voyageurs, for those churches that find that their young men enjoy this type of ministry and are interested in leadership development. Some older boys choose to stay on in the ministry and serve as junior counselors after having completed leadership training requirements. Cadets also partners with GEMS to produce a curriculum for 4 and 5 year-olds called Kingdom Kids.

- Kingdom Kids (4 & 5 year-olds)
- Junior Cadets (grades 1-3)
- Recruit•Pathfinder•Builder (grades 4-6)
- Guide Trails (grades 7-8)
- Voyageurs (grades 9 and above)

== Awards ==
The CCC's highest honor is the "Servant Leader" award.

"In order to gain this award, a Cadet must progress through all the ranks from recruit to advanced guide, earning at least 11 merit badges and six of the more difficult guide trails. They must also help in the planning of a regional Cadet Corps event, and participate in a Christian service project of at least five days." according to Cadet Corps executive director Steven Bootsma.

At the Council and organizational level, blue and gold stars are regularly awarded to honor the contributions of counselors.

== Periodicals ==
The Corps publishes four periodicals, the Cadet Quest, the Clarion, the Independent Update, and the DCE Connection.

=== Cadet Quest Magazine ===
The Calvinist Cadet Corps publishes Cadet Quest magazine seven times during a Cadet season — September/October, November, December, January, February, March, and April/May. The magazine is specifically for boys, ages 9–14. The magazine defines its purpose as "using stories, articles, news, humor, puzzles, games, and projects to encourage boys to be servants and leaders in their homes and communities." All Cadets can submit items which they request to be published in the Cadet Quest and Cadet-submitted jokes are regularly published. All Cadets are encouraged to complete the Bible lessons provided; in many cases, these are integrated into weekly meetings.

=== Clarion Newsletter ===
The Clarion Newsletter supports the Cadet counselors in their roles as mentors with articles that inform and train, as well as providing project and service ideas. It is published three times during a Cadet season — Fall, Winter, and Spring

=== Independent Update ===
The Independent Update is designed for the specific needs of clubs that are geographically isolated and don’t have the benefit of getting together with other local clubs for training. It is published three times during the Cadet season — fall, winter, and spring

=== DCE Connection ===
The CCC has developed a program that trains men to go back to their local clubs and, in turn, educate and train the local counselor. The men who complete this training are called Developers of Counselor Education (DCEs). In order to serve these DCEs a newsletter is sent out twice during the Cadet season to update their training skills and to encourage them in their local educational endeavors.

== Training opportunities ==
Volunteer leaders (counselors) are offered several training opportunities in which to learn how to use the Cadet curriculum as well as gain important insights into the lives of the age group they are teaching.

=== Counselors’ conventions ===
Each summer, with the exception of the summer when an international camporee is taking place, the Cadet Corps sponsors a counselors’ convention. The event is hosted by Cadet councils and the venue and activities for the event are coordinated by the host council committee. The event typically will take place in the area where the host council is located. This event is seen by the organization as an opportunity for counselors and their families to learn, share, and recommit themselves to serving the ministry. The organization values family support for the men who serve as counselors; because of this, the conventions are family events, providing workshops and activities for wives and activities for children.

=== Regional conferences ===
Where there are concentrations of clubs within reasonable driving distance, the local councils in that region host annual weekend conferences. These events will allow the counselors to receive training and share ideas in a form that will fit their financial and time constraints.

=== Council meetings ===
Wherever there are three or more clubs in geographic proximity the organization encourages them to form a council. The councils' primary objectives are to share club resources, sponsor larger events that enhance a boy's experience as a cadet, such as field days, pinewood derby races, and collective camping trips, and develop educational opportunities for counselors. The educational opportunities typically take place at a monthly or bimonthly council meeting where several workshops or demonstrations will be held.

== Accountability ==
The Calvinist Cadet Corps is a member of the Evangelical Council for Financial Accountability. Members of the ECFA must adhere to seven standards of responsible stewardship including high standards of accountability in fund-raising, financial disclosure, confidentiality of donor information, and the use of resources. The ministry submits to an annual independent audit.
