= Pathfinders (Seventh-day Adventist) =

Seventh-day Adventist scout organization

Pathfinder Club
- Pathfinder Emblem
- Formation: 1950
- Type: Adventist youth organization
- Key people: Andrés J. Peralta
- Website: Pathfinder Site: clubministries.org

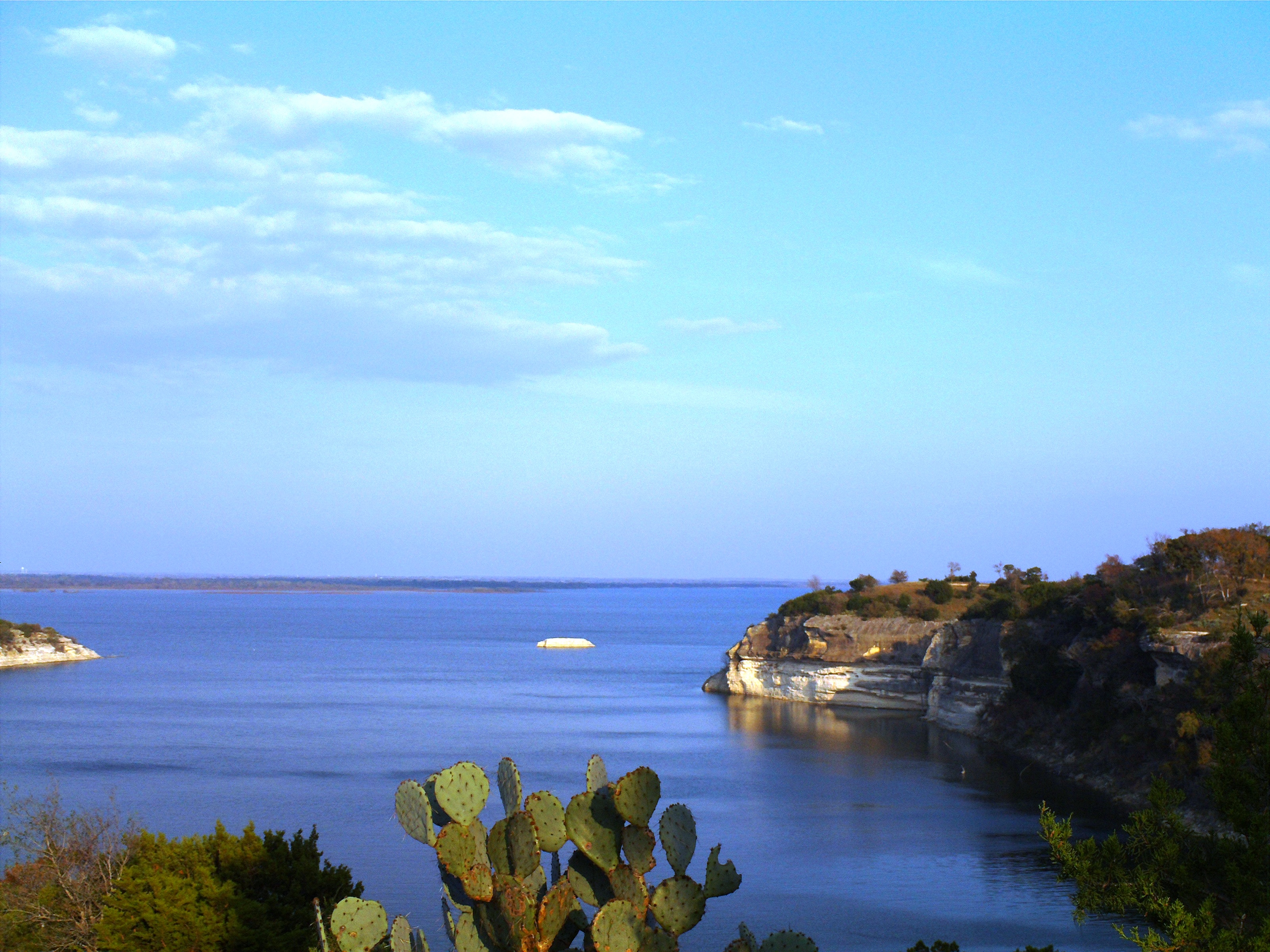
Pathfinder Camp Area: Lake Whitney Ranch, Texas

The Pathfinder Club, or simply Pathfinders, is a department of the Seventh-day Adventist Church (SDA), which works specifically with the cultural, social and religious education of children and teens. Children 10 years to 16 are eligible to become members of the club as students. Teens and adults older then 16 can become teachers and assistant teacher.

Though similar in many respects to Scouting, Pathfinders have a stronger religious emphasis. The Pathfinder Club has been an official component of the SDA church's youth ministry since 1950. The current director of the program is Andrés J. Peralta.

An estimated 38% of Adventist youth under the age of 18 "Are members of Pathfinders or a similar church-sponsored youth group", according to a 2002 worldwide survey of local church leaders.

== History ==
The first step towards the organization of the Pathfinders Club within the Adventist Church in 1907 when the Department of Youth Missionary Volunteer (Volunteer Missionary Society) was established under the leadership of Pastor Milton Early Kern.

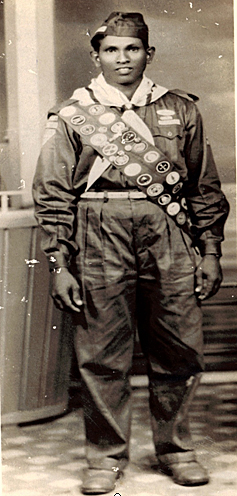
Pr. Samuthram in 1958, founder of the "Society of Missionary Volunteers" in Malaysia

In 1909 are the first organized societies Missionary Volunteer Youth (MVY), and in 1914 developed the first lessons to be MVJ's, that would be the precursor of the progressive classes Pathfinder.

In 1911 the nascent form of the Pathfinder club was founded in Takoma Park, Maryland. Three clubs were formed in Takoma Park in 1911, they were: "Scouts Missions", "Woodland Clan & Pals" and "Takoma Indians". They were characterized by only accepting registration for boys. In 1919 Arthur Spalding founded the club "Scouts Missionaries", in Madison County, Tennessee. Spalding studied the organization, made compatible with the spiritual goals of the Adventist Church (a feature that was not initially adopted by clubs from Takoma Park), rules and created the outline of the movement. The "Scouts Missionaries" developed the fundamental ideals for the current club of pathfinders.

In 1929 for the first time the name "pathfinder" was used on a schedule of juvenile SDA activities. The Association of Southern California promotes a camp for Youth Missionary Volunteers, and entitles the camp "Pathfinder". The same Association (Southern California) in 1946 unilaterally formalizes and sponsors the program, with its first prototype recognized club being tested in Riverside, California.

Alongside the experience in California, the General Conference of Seventh-day Adventists in 1950, formalizes a program the club, and adopts a uniform, a flag (ade by Hellen Hobbs and Henry Theodore Bergh in 1948) and a hymn (composed in 1949 by Henry Theodore Bergh) for the official new department. The name was adopted for the program "Youth Club - Missionary Volunteer".

Between 9–11 October 1953, the Southern Association of New England promoted the first Pathfinder Camporee in Ashburnham, Massachusetts. Since then camporees has been the main camp and form of interaction between Pathfinder clubs worldwide.

Since the formalization of the movement as the SDA program, it has undergone some upgrades, the most significant being:

- (1958) Development of progressive classes;
- (1959) Development of physical classes (gold and silver medals);
- (1976) Addition of honor "Master Awards" to the curriculum of the club;
- (1982) The global emblem Missionary Volunteer is replaced by the Pathfinder world emblem, and the name Missionary Volunteer falls into disuse;
- (1988) A major overhaul of the Pathfinder curriculum to modernize the teaching methods;
- (2012) The second general review of the Pathfinders curriculum is carried out;

In January 2018, there were more than 1.5 million Pathfinders and 40,000 clubs, spread over more than 150 countries.

== Philosophy and objectives ==
The Pathfinder Club is centered in the "physical-mental-spiritual tripod", which develops activities to meet the needs and interests of children and adolescents between 10 and 15 years old, with a specific focus on the religious activities of this age group.

Much of the Pathfinder Club program is built around physical activities. According to the Pathfinder club manual, this focus is explained because "young people between 10 and 15 years old are at a stage of growth and very rapid physical development." According to the philosophy, many of the club activities involve action, adventure, challenge and group activities, which "provide opportunities for the development of new attitudes and skills that produce personal growth, team and community spirit,". These are part of the tripod of the philosophy to work towards "citizenship and loyalty" and that preach respect for "God, His creation, and His church."

While the Pathfinder Club exists primarily for the youth, one of its primary purposes is to also meet parents and church members through an active involvement with the club. The purpose of this involvement is to correct (or suppress) the gap between generations approaching youth and adults. And to work and have fun together in a bond of common experience.

The whole philosophy of Pathfinders is built on the premise that "juveniles and children learn best by example, instead of the precepts." The way they see the leaders and parental values is used as a spiritual and social role model. With this they are expected to develop high moral principles, attitudes of love, care and determination. These are built into all the activities. The educational philosophy of the club also emphasizes that youth learn more effectively in a positive, happy and secure atmosphere. According to the General Conference of SDA, "the attitude of the leaders of the club is therefore vital to ensure the success and effectiveness of this ministry for youth ingredient, because it will be one of the main models to be followed by juveniles."

=== Leadership role ===
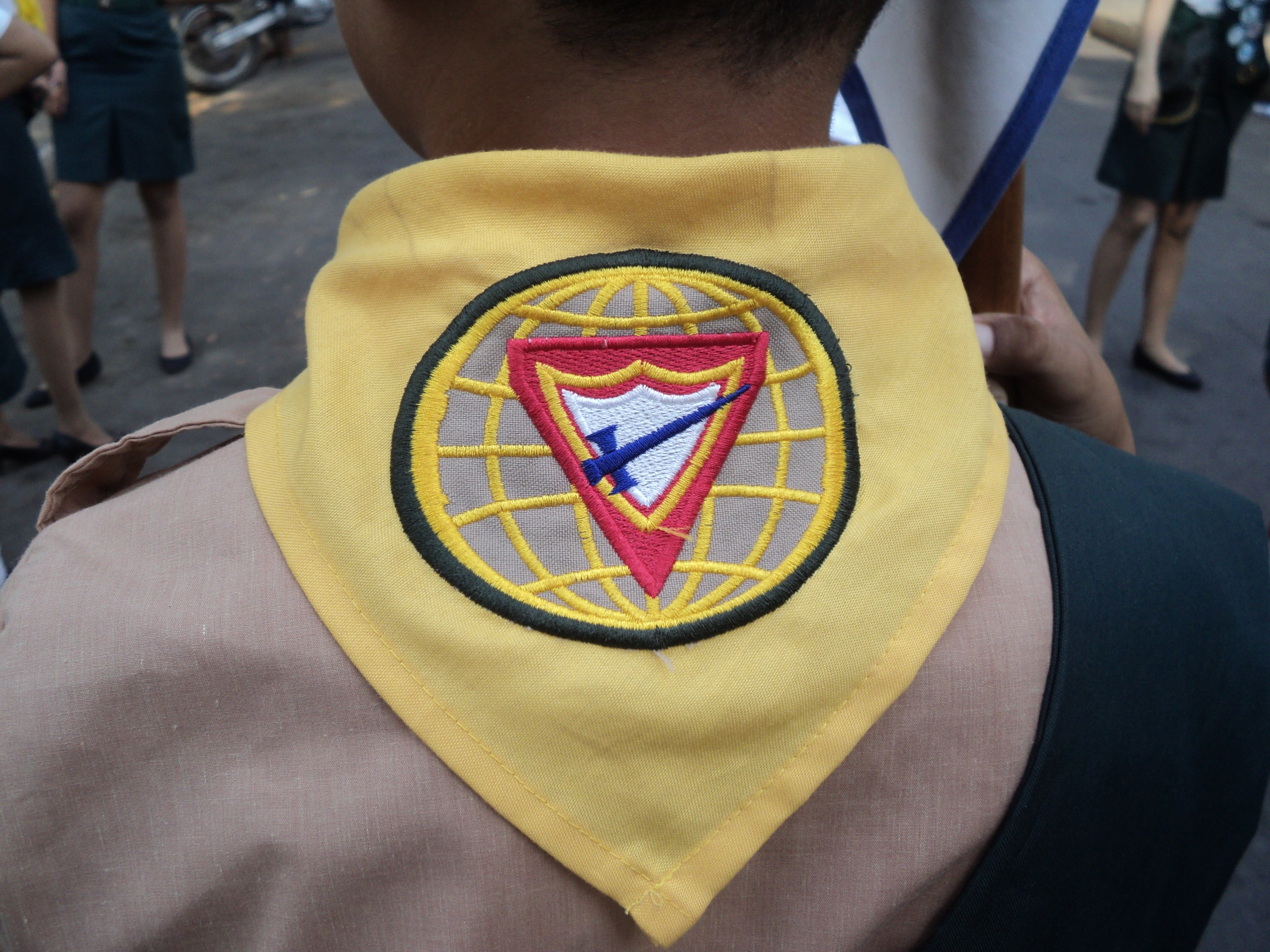
Pathfinder Club Scarf

The leadership role is to "help young people understand and love God and to watch over the church and the next." According to the Manual of the Pathfinder club, the goals and duties of the leadership of the club are:

- "Encourage Pathfinders to discover their God-given potential and use their gifts and skills to meet the expectations of the plan of salvation";
- "Inspire them to give personal expression of their love for God, uniting with other youth in various extension activities";
- "Becoming number one priority club program the personal salvation of every Pathfinder";
- "Building on the groundbreaking appreciation for a healthy life (enjoy outdoor activities) and cultivate in them a love for God's creation";
- "Teach the groundbreaking immersive and interactive skills in order to make the time and talents of the most significant youth";
- He should "encourage the Pathfinder to keep physically fit, and teaches them to take care of your body and establish habits that will give your health benefits";
- "Provide opportunities for development of leadership by encouraging club members working together and sharing the responsibilities of leadership.";
- "And aim to promote the harmonious development of pathfinder, taking care of all necessary aspects, be they physical, social, intellectual and spiritual."

== Organization ==
Each Pathfinder club is run by a director of the club, deputy directors, counselors, instructors, chaplain, secretary and treasurer. The administrative offices of the club require that trained people are occupying the function. The General Conference Youth Department instructs that preferably leaders be invested - 18 years old, who have completed the "Class Leader" - or at least they are fulfilling the requirements of the Class Leader.

The club is divided into separate units, classified by age. Each unit has an average of six or eight pathfinders, depending on club size, who are accompanied by a counselor. The counselor is the unit leader. The unit functions as a cell of the club, or "micro-club" because it also develops an administrative organization chart with a captain and a secretary, and develops practical and theoretical activities through interaction among its members.

Clubs are also organized into "regions", which act as groups of geographically close local clubs. Regions usually have the authority to develop longer term activities (e.g. camporees), demanding more effort and planning, also supporting the clubs through the "regional team". The region is coordinated by a regional coordinator, usually an invested leader.

On a broader scope is the local coordination of Pathfinder fields (missions, associations, unions and divisions), which, as well as regional, has the mandate to coordinate activities that require more planning, besides answering to the General Conference for all activities and work done in a geographic region.

== Activities developed ==
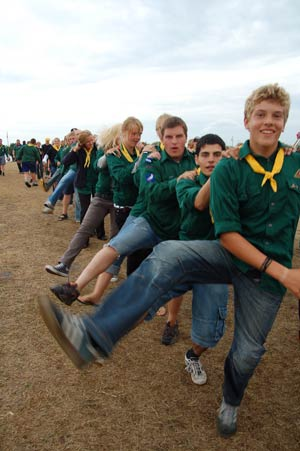
The Adventistspejderne at a Camporee in 2006. The Adventistspejderne are the Danish Pathfinders.

Various activities are carried out in the club program, and subdivided according to the educational tripod club, focusing on the physical, mental and spiritual.

=== Physical health ===
As part of the official program, physical activity is valued, per the philosophy of the club stating that "juveniles (between 10 and 15 years) are at a stage of growth and very rapid physical development". Various activities such as hiking, jungle trails, cycling, mountaineering, among others, have highlighted the activities of the department.

Activities inside and outside of the regular meeting of the club focus on the physical, such as recreational activities and games that encourage exercise. Even traditional activities of the regular meeting, as the united order, cherish the physical aspect, combined with the mental development.

Physical activities are, in essence (within the official philosophy), to entertain and attract children and adolescents, and allow it to jointly develop their mental and spiritual aspect.

=== Mental framework ===
A part of mental development is encouraging youth to study and develop classes and specialties, which are analogous to series and school subjects.

Although also understand the physical and spiritual aspects, classes and specialties bring a greater benefit to the mental explorer context, providing a larger learning about various subjects.

=== Spiritual realm ===
Although the physical part requires considerable time within the activities, spiritual development is the main focus of the club. The main objective is to bring the youth to have a "constant daily experience with God", making him reflect on "His creation and His care for him."

In spiritual matters, it carries out various activities to engage youth. Stand out missionary work, Bible studies and volunteer work.

One example activity that strengthens both the spiritual and mental realms is known as the Pathfinder Bible Experience. This is a friendly competition that encourages youth to study and memorize entire books of the Bible.

==== Christian citizenship ====
Within the spiritual realm there is the notion of Christian citizenship in Pathfinder club. This is an integral part of working with youth, and establishes the concepts (or second tripod) of "citizenship and loyalty" which are three: to serve God, the homeland, and others. The social work of the entire department is guided by this concept.

== Classes, specialties and merit system ==
=== Regular and advanced classes ===
Regular classes are activities that cover various topics, always considering the educational philosophy of the club. Classes resemble academic degrees, as is recommended to be developed within one year in accordance with the correct age for each class. Jointly develop the advanced classes, which contains more elaborate requirements, and usually with some degree of difficulty with regular classes. There are twelve existing classes for youth:

Standard classes	Advanced classes	Minimum grade/age	Class color
Friend	Nature's Friend	5th grade, Age 10/11	Blue
Companion	Excursion Companion	6th Grade, Age 11/12	Red
Explorer	Field and Forest's Explorer	7th Grade, Age 12/13	Green
Ranger	New Frontiers Ranger	8th Grade, Age 13/14	Silver
Voyager	Woods Voyager	9th Grade, Age 14/15	Burgundy
Guide	Exploration Guide	10th Grade, Age 15/16	Gold
Teen Leadership Training	—	Teenage Years 13+	No color
Master Guide	Master Leader: 20+ years Advanced Master Leader: 22+ years	After 4 Years of TLT	Gold

=== Leadership and specializations ===
Upon completing 16 years the Pathfinder has the possibility to choose to stay at the club and compose the picture of leadership. If this is the choice of young, he/she will answer the leading classes, which are three: Leader, Master Guide and Master Guide Senior. These classes have the task of preparing and empowering the youth who will compose the frames of leadership, giving all necessary instructions in this regard.

While the Leader class allows for the formation of leaders in a broader sense, the Master Guide class exists to specialize leaders already invested who will work on the technical training of aspirants. The latest degree of specialization, Master Guide Senior, is focused on the production and review of technical and didactic content for the department.

=== Specialties and masters ===
The specials are theoretical and practical activities focused on certain specific theme, like intensive courses. Your goal is to take the Pathfinder assimilate new knowledge from areas related to nutrition and health, to recreational areas so that empower and train to handle many different situations. In his philosophy, the specials are also thought to help in the spiritual and moral development.

The masters are groupings of related specialties that developed, give the explorer, through the merits of the club system, the possibility of this being awarded the merit of knowing a particular area of knowledge.

=== Merit system ===
The Pathfinder Merit System allows youth and adults to develop their skills in four major areas of activity, which are recognized in the club's program as pillars of support, namely: the church, family, school (or work) and the club itself.

The incentive for good practice in all these pillars is recognized through the Good Conduct Ribbon Bar (the Pathfinder Excellence Award), which is awarded every 12 months to those young people (under 15 years of age) of recognized moral excellence. The club director, together with the other members of the board, are responsible for judging whether the candidate is fit. In some parts of the world, people over the age of 16 are eligible to receive the Good Conduct Ribbon Bar after five years of uninterrupted volunteer service at the club; in the case of these, it is the regional leader and the district leader who judge the suitability.

Other graduations par excellence include so-called classes of physical merit, which are as follows: Silver Medal, and Gold Medal. They are characterized by strongly encouraging the physical and athletic development of adolescents and youth who are in the leadership cadres of the Pathfinder club, the Adventurers Club and Youth Club.

== See also ==
- Medical Cadet Corps
- Adventurers
