= Boy Rangers of America =

United States scouting program

- Age range: 8—15 years
- Headquarters: New York City
- Country: United States
- Founded: January 24, 1913
- Founder: Emerson Brooks
- Chief Guide: Emerson Brooks

The Boy Rangers of America was a Scouting program in the United States for boys ages 8 through 12. It was organized on January 24, 1913 in Montclair, New Jersey by Emerson Brooks. Although independent of the Boy Scouts of America, it was the precursor of the BSA's Cubbing program now known as Cub Scouting.

== Background ==
Great Laws

Trusty Tommy is a Ranger
Loyal true to every test,
Helpful to the needy stranger
Friendly, giving of his best.
Courteous to the girls he knows
Kind, a good turn every day
Obedient to his parents, too,
Cheerful, both in work and play
Thrifty, saving for a need
Brave, and not a faker
Clean in thought, in speech and deed
Reverent to his Maker.

Password

How Kola (Hail, friend)

Motto

Be Trustworthy

Slogan

Talk straight, think straight, live straight

As early as 1911, Ernest Thompson Seton, the Chief Scout of the BSA, had developed a program for the Boy Scouts of America named Cub Scouts of America that was never implemented. Chief Scout Executive James E. West felt that having BSA programs for younger boys under 12 would draw away boys from the core Scouting program. Unofficial programs for younger boys started around this time, under names such as Junior Troops or Cadet Corps.

Emerson Brooks, a Boy Scout commissioner, started the Boy Rangers in 1913 and it came to the attention of the BSA. West encouraged further formation of the Boy Rangers of America, as an organization separate from the BSA, and they were incorporated in New York on March 6, 1918.

Boy Rangers were organized as a tribe of eight boys and an adult; up to six tribes would form a lodge. Rank levels were Paleface, Papoose, Brave, Hunter, Warrior and Hi-Pa-Nac. The programs used American Indian themes and the Great Laws were based on the BSA version of the Scout Law. The official publication was the magazine The Boy Ranger.

The BSA obtained the rights to Baden-Powell's The Wolf Cub Handbook in 1916 and used it in unofficial Wolf Cub programs starting in 1918. The BSA finally began some experimental Cubbing units in 1928 and in 1930 the BSA began registering the first Cubbing packs. Many Boy Ranger lodges converted to Cubbing and the Indian themes of the Boy Rangers were incorporated into early Cubbing programs.

Membership numbers are difficult to determine. Some sources state that "at its height" in the 1920s, the Boy Rangers had over 8,000 members in over 700 lodges throughout 47 states, while another states they had 1039 lodges in 1940. When Emerson Brooks died in 1948, his obituary claimed "200,000 members in forty states and several foreign countries."

The Boy Rangers mainly merged into the BSA with the birth of Cubbing in 1930. It was reported that Lewis Lawes became the president of the Boy Rangers in 1941. Some lodges— such as the one formed in Wellesley, Massachusetts in 1926 —continued locally through the 1980s. The Great Laws survive as a Cub Scout song that is sung to the tune of Yankee Doodle.

== Fictional Boy Rangers ==
When Columbia Pictures produced the 1939 film Mr. Smith Goes to Washington the Boy Scouts of America refused to allow their name to be used. Columbia created a fictional Boy Rangers for the film with different uniforms. The same organization reappeared in the studio's Blondie in Society (1941).
