= Adventurers (Seventh-day Adventist) =

Seventh-day Adventist children's club

Adventurer Club
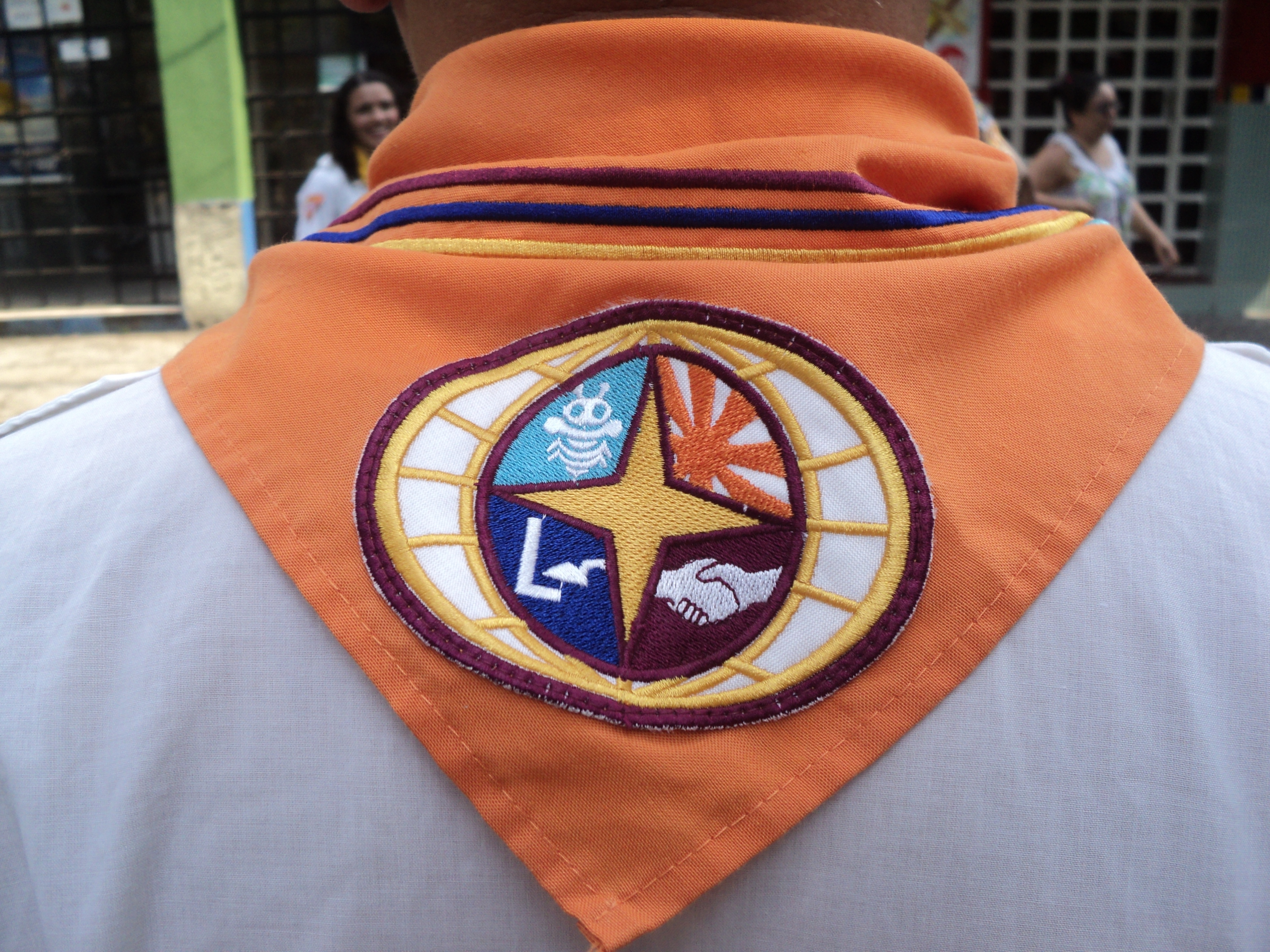
- Master Guide neckerchief Adventurer Club
- Abbreviation: Adventurers
- Formation: 1972
- Type: Adventist youth organization
- Key people: Andres Peralta
- Website: Adventurers website

The Adventurer Club is a program for young children created by the Seventh-day Adventist Church (SDA) in 1972, similar to Scouting.

Inspired by its "older brother", the Pathfinder Club, the Adventurer Club is a program focused on education of children aged 4–10 years with additional sections for children ages 3 and under.

The Adventurers program is designed to support parents in raising their children in wisdom and stature in favour with God and men. The club recognises the parents as the primary teachers of their children and key people in the children’s lives to lead the children to Jesus.

== History ==
The club was founded in 1972. In 1988, the invited interested associations and experts in children to study and improve the design of the Adventurer Club. A committee met a year later (1989) to update the curriculum and specialties, and establish standards for the organization and how the club should function. Leaders participating in this work included Sabbath School Children, educators, Children's Ministry Coordinators(Adventist department that develops programs specifically for children), and other experts in family and early childhood education.

In 1991, the General Conference of Seventh-day Adventist Church authorized a global program, setting goals, curriculum, flag, uniform and ideals.

Based on work by the Florida Conference the Adventurer Club program has now been expanded to cover:

- Little Lambs-Pre-K/Age 4
- Eager Beaver-Kindergarten/Age 5

The names of the levels may vary in different languages and regions. For example, in the South Pacific Division, where there are no native beavers, the level for 5 year old children is called Little Fish instead. The General Conference Youth Ministries has also changed the Eager Beaver program into Early Bird.

== Leadership ==
Adventurers clubs are run by volunteers, mostly parents and guardians. Local congregations nominate local club directors. Club directors are assisted by other leaders such as club secretary, treasurer, chaplain, counsellors, and instructors. These form the core of the local adventurers club leadership.

== See also ==
- Seventh-day Adventist Church
- Pathfinders
- Medical Cadet Corps
