= Medical Cadet Corps =

Seventh-day Adventist Church medical training organization

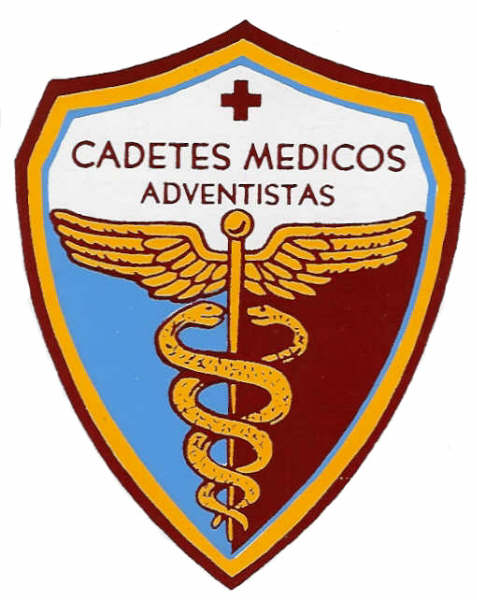
Medical Cadets coat of arms

The Medical Cadet Corp (MCC) is a program of the Seventh-day Adventist Church. It started in the 1930s in the United States with the intention of preparing young men of draft age for military service in noncombatant roles. The training included drill, first aid, military courtesies, organization of medical corps, defense against chemical warfare, principles of anatomy and physiology, physical exercises and character development. The program was temporarily suspended at the end of World War II. It was reactivated in 1950 then a few years after was adapted internationally. The program was deactivated by the General Conference of Seventh-day Adventists in early 1972 but continued independently in a few locations with an emphasis on rescue and disaster response.

In 2016, the Medical Cadet Corps, a component of the World Service Organization that is under the umbrella of the General Conference Department of Adventist Chaplaincy Ministries, was reactivated as a worldwide program.

== Background ==
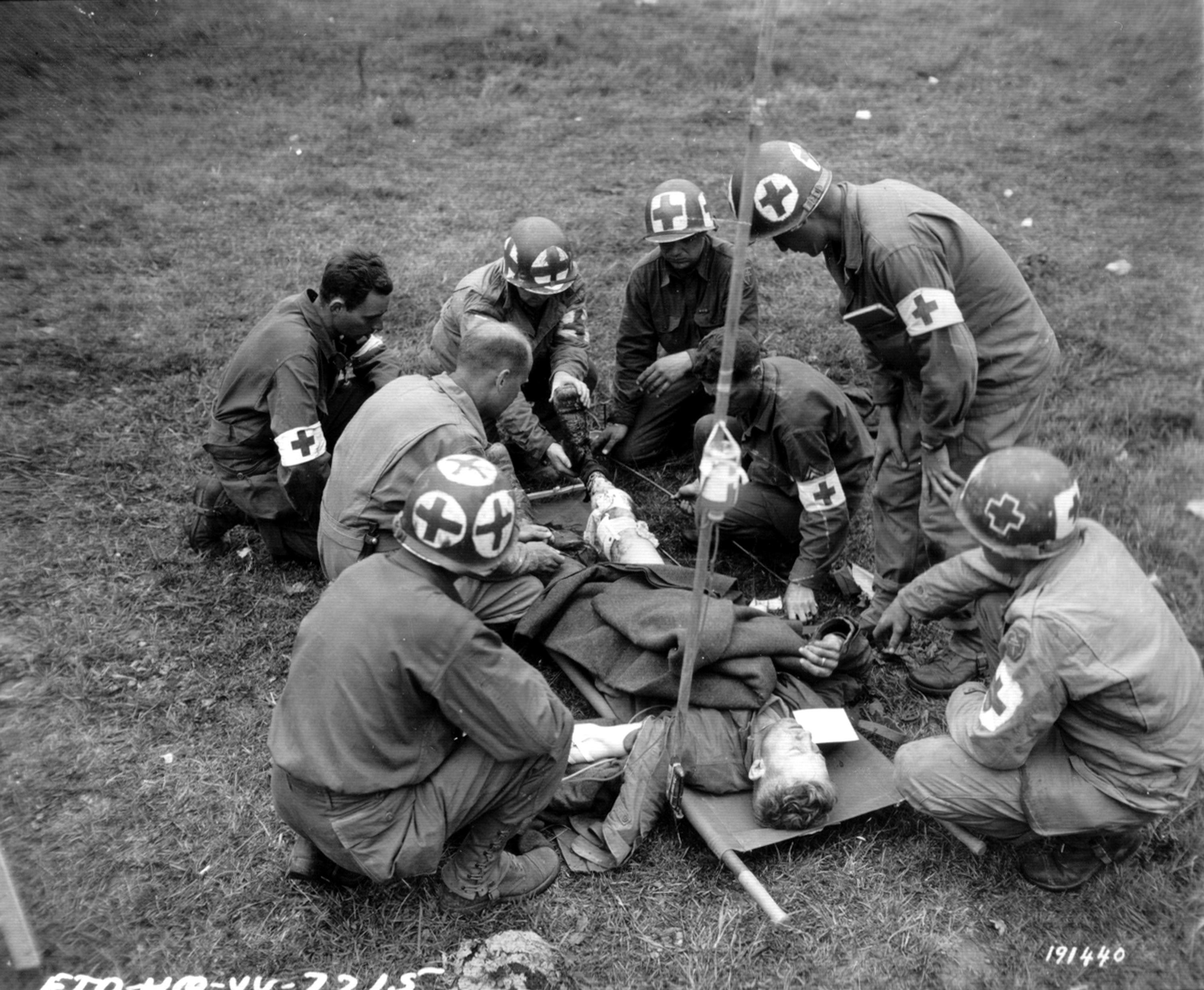
Medical team at work during WWII.

When the Seventh-day Adventist movement was formally organized in 1863 during the height of the American Civil War, military conscription was one of the first major challenges to be addressed by the fledgling denomination. Even before 1863, Adventist beliefs about combatancy generally fell into one of three opinion groups: pacifists who felt any military service was a violation of God's command to not commit murder; militant abolitionists who felt that military service would honor God's will in ending slavery; and non-combatants who believed it to be their Christian duty to support the government in roles which did not violate the fourth and sixth commandments (see Ten Commandments). This latter position ultimately emerged as the denomination's policy and set precedent for future periods of conscription in the United States. When conscription became law in March 1863, most drafted Adventists took advantage of the option to purchase an exemption, which cost $300 per person. This sum was not easy for many to come by and church leaders encouraged all members to contribute toward purchasing these exemptions for drafted members. In February 1864 the conscription law was amended to allow conscientious objectors to serve in the military in noncombatant roles. A short time later this provision was revised so that it would apply only to recognized conscientious objectors. Church leaders quickly moved to acquire this recognition from state governors in Michigan, Wisconsin, Illinois, Pennsylvania, and finally the Federal government.

Following the Civil War, the United States military returned to an all-volunteer force. The Indian Wars and Spanish–American War did not require large numbers of soldiers. Adventist denominational history is mostly silent in regard to these conflicts. When World War I erupted in Europe there was much more cause for concern. The Seventh-day Adventist Church looked at the issue in the Autumn Council of 1916 in the General Conference Committee for a way, in keeping with the church's noncombatant beliefs, to allow the young men of the church to fulfill their obligations. The medical military service was the direction they took.

However, since 1863 the Adventist church had grown both inside and outside of the United States. Members in Europe were divided by political and battle lines, sometimes isolating them from the rest of the church. The war in Europe began so quickly it was difficult for the church to form a cohesive policy or to support drafted church members. In the United States, efforts to support drafted church members were more orderly and the government continued to make provisions for conscientious objectors. However, misunderstandings did arise between some Adventists draftees who took extreme positions and their company officers who often did not understand or respect the position of conscientious objectors. It is unknown how many Adventists were actually drafted during World War I. Charles Longacre, who was in charge of church military relations in the United States for most of World War I, claimed that 186 American Seventh-day Adventists were court-martialed during the war and 35 were imprisoned in disciplinary barracks at Fort Leavenworth at the end of the war. The denomination's initiative to support draftees and the war effort in general was multifaceted; encouraging church members to support government conservation programs, calling for pre-induction medical training, providing camp pastors, and planning to set up Servicemen's Rest Homes in Europe. The short time between the United States' entry into the war and its end meant that some of these actions were not implemented and the effectiveness of others is undetermined.

The experience of American Adventists during World War I generated several lessons which shaped the church's response to the draft during World War II, the Korean War, and the Vietnam War. First, Adventists working in the Medical Corps (United States Army) experienced the fewest conflicts regarding the keeping of Sabbath and bearing of arms. Second, pre-induction military medical training enhanced the effectiveness of Adventists who did serve and reduced the problems they faced. Third, educating church members regarding their obligations to both God and society reduced the extremism which often led to courts-martial.

== History ==
=== Origin ===
Following World War I a number of faculty members in Adventist colleges believed that pre-military training and guidance should continue to be given students of draft age. At Emmanuel Missionary College (now Andrews University) in 1927 Lewis S. Williams started a program, but when it was criticized as being "too militaristic" it was stopped. At Walla Walla College (now Walla Walla University) students directed a set of questions to the General Conference regarding whether it was better to enlist or be drafted, clarification regarding appropriate duties for Sabbath, whether it was ever acceptable to bear arms, and whether the moral nature of a conflict changed one's responsibility for military service. The students' questions were discussed by a General Conference committee of seven individuals charged with studying noncombatancy. However, this group could not reach a consensus, so the questions remained unanswered.

The College Medical Corps was founded by Everett N. Dick at Union College in 1934 as a way to train males for noncombatant medic military service. The Medical Cadet Corps was founded for students of the College of Medical Evangelists in 1936 by Cyril B. Courville. In 1937, Dick presented his program to other Adventist educators which led to other college adopting the program. In 1937 in Glendale, California, a new Pathfinder group was founded which also added military drills from the MCC. With other Adventist colleges following suit by installing similar programs, the Fall Council of the General Conference Executive Committee in 1939 gave it official sanction and centralization under the name of Medical Cadet Corps. In various places, a Women's Cadet Corps also existed. The GC appointed Dick as the denominational program director and recommended that all Adventist colleges start an MCC program. When the General Conference met for its Autumn Council in 1939 shortly after fighting broke out in Europe, church leaders finally sanctioned the Union College Medical Corps program, but formally adopted Courville's Medical Cadet Corps name; although the program would always focus on preparing enlisted soldiers. About this time, Everett Dick and two other leaders met with officials of the U.S. Surgeon General's office to establish a unified curriculum for the MCC. Thus started a twenty-year relationship between Dick and officers of the Surgeon General's office. This relationship resulted in a curriculum continuously revised to meet evolving military standards and recognition for Adventist soldiers which routinely placed them in the Army's Medical Corps.

== World War II ==
Nearly every Adventist college and secondary school in the United States participated in the MCC program. Each one chose its own uniform, but patches were used in common. Training manuals also differed from location to location. Everett Dick, on temporary leave from Union College, was placed in charge of the central region of the country. Chris P. Sorenson was in charge of the eastern third and Floyd G. Ashbaugh was in charge of the program west of the Rocky Mountains. Each man was expected to promote the program in his region and to conduct officer training camps which trained leaders for the corps established on Adventist academic campuses and, in some places, churches. When this system developed flaws, Dick was asked to direct the program nationwide which he did until he returned to full-time work at Union College in 1942. Women first received training at Atlantic Union College and many academies required training for both men and women. Summer camps were held in order to facilitate training for men who were not attending Adventist academies or colleges. With the cessation of World War II, many campuses stopped teaching the courses. Only Union College and Southwestern Junior College (now Southwestern Adventist University) continued their MCC programs without interruption.

=== Cold War Era ===
With the end of World War II, the program ended. The Corps was reactivated in 1950 in response to the reestablishment of the draft. The MCC was officially reactivated in 1950 with an officer's training camp in a former Civilian Conservation Corps camp (now Mountain Park) near Beulah, Colorado. During this decade, uniforms were standardized and all officers were required to train at national camps so that every MCC unit across the nation operated under the same guidelines and instruction. Leadership was centralized under Everett Dick, who as MCC commander held the rank of colonel. Beginning 1954 he was also associate secretary of the War Service Commission.

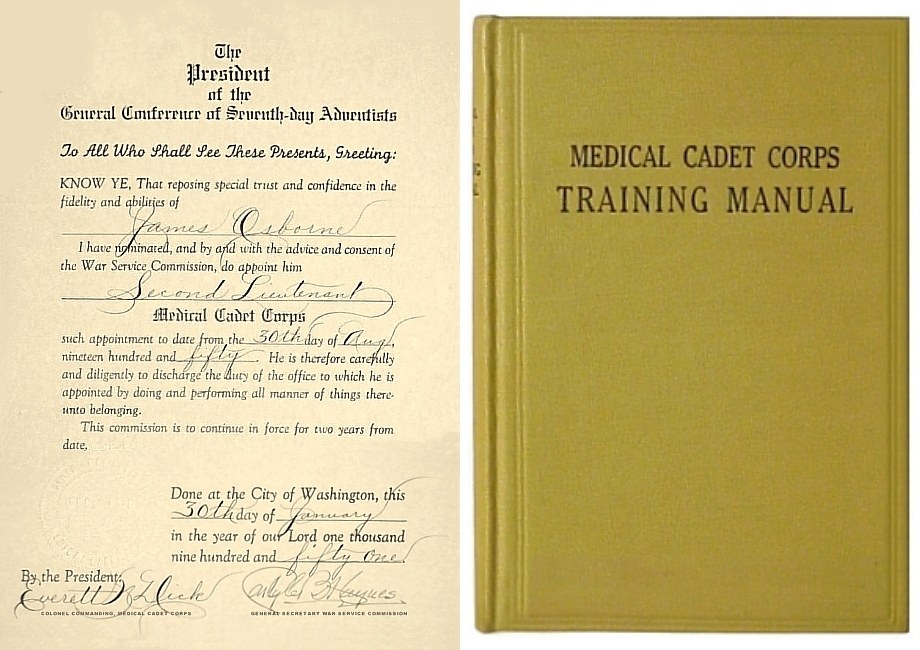
2nd Lieutenant James F. Osborne MCC Instructor Jan '51 - Jan '53 SDA Academy, Lodi CA

=== Decline ===
After Everett Dick resigned in 1958, Clark Smith who had worked with Dick since the MCC's beginning at Union College in 1934, became the commander. Camp Doss continued to be held in the summers through at least 1970. However support for the MCC in the United States declined after Dick's retirement, perhaps more due to the U.S. Army's implementation of its own noncombatant training program at Fort Sam Houston. Most Adventist colleges and academies stopped offering MCC courses by 1960. Interest further declined as the war in Vietnam grew increasingly unpopular. When the draft in the United States ended in 1973, the General Conference closed the denomination-wide program. Similarly MCC programs in other countries which were strong while the countries were under military dictatorships declined when more democratic governments gained power. The MCC continued to operate locally in some areas but with an emphasis on disaster response and collaboration with Adventist Community Services rather than pre-induction military medical training. In other countries with mandatory military service or a draft, a similar program still operates.

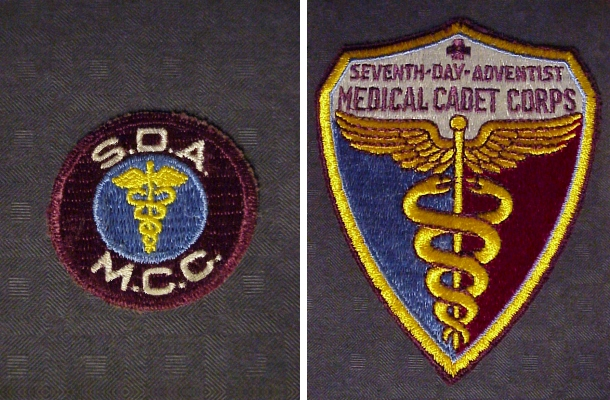

Uniform Patches - 1950s

== Camp Desmond T. Doss ==
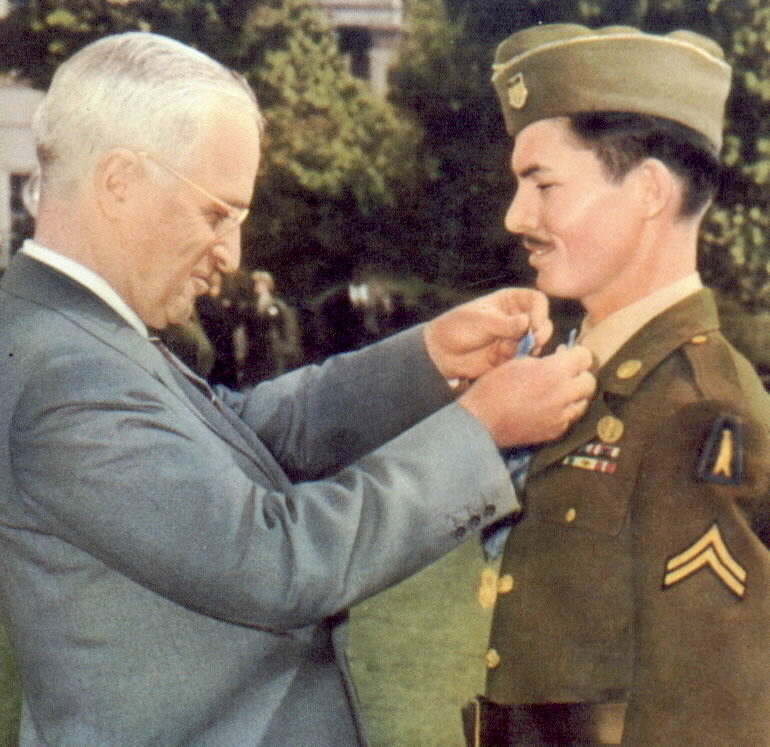
Corporal Doss receiving the Medal of Honor from President Harry Truman on October 12, 1945

In 1950 a 10-day summer camp training program was held at Grand Ledge, Michigan on the Michigan Conference camp meeting grounds. Named for Desmond T. Doss, the first conscientious objector to receive the Medal of Honor, this camp became an annual event until about 1970. Doss himself frequently attended, an attraction that helped bring more young men to the camp each year. From 1951 until 1958, Everett Dick commanded Camp Doss aided by a core group of MCC leaders who gathered at Grand Ledge each summer from across the nation. The camp also attracted international visitors interested in creating MCC programs in their home countries. Visitors and inquiries about the camp came from Brazil, Cuba, Dominican Republic, Puerto Rico, Mexico, and South Africa. The camp was active throughout the Korean and Vietnam wars before the property was sold in 1988.

== International Expansion ==
Creed

I am a Medical Cadet, a defender of human rights, I serve all just and noble causes.
I am proud to be one. I will always act correctly, asking the Almighty to continuously guide my steps everywere I go.
I am proud to be a part of this organization. I will do everything in my power to keep on high our morals and standards.
I will be loyal to those that I serve. I will obey the orders and instructions of my superiors.
In God I trust.
AMEN.

—

With the reactivation of the MCC, its proven success for American Adventists, and promotion by American missionaries serving internationally, interest grew in establishing the MCC in many countries around the world. During World War II, MCC training was initiated independently in a few locations, but in 1951 the General Conference purposefully began promoting the MCC program throughout the world through the newly established International Commission for Medical Cadet Service. Everett Dick was invited to Canada in 1951 to assist with creating a training program for officers. In 1953, 1955, and 1957 he traveled to the Far East to establish and supervise corps. He also visited the Caribbean and Lebanon. In each country where the MCC was adopted, relationships were established with the local military and the curriculum adapted to the standards of that country. The MCC was most popular in countries ruled by military governments or under immediate threat of conflict. It was not popular in Europe and was established with reluctance in Japan.

- Argentina: Training was held at River Plate Junior College (now Universidad Adventista del Plata) in Argentina during January and February 1944. Instructors included Ellis R. Maas, Dr. Carlos E. Westphal, Dr. Marcelo Hammerly, Oreste Biaggi, and Justo J. Vallejos.
- Brazil: MCC training was first attempted at South Brazil College in São Paulo, Brazil in 1943. The program was not successful until June 1953 when Domingo Peixoto, Department of Civil Rights and Duties for the Brazil Union, obtained government approval for the program. Peixoto went on to become the commanding colonel for the MCC in Brazil.
- Canada: The first Canadian Medical Cadet Corps training was held in Oshawa, Ontario under the leadership of Lawrence Smart in February 1951. Later that year Everett Dick was invited to participate in Camp Almansask which met from July 24 to August 7 at the Manitoba-Saskatchewan Conference camp meeting grounds in Saskatoon, Saskatchewan. It was sponsored by the Manitoba-Saskatchewan and Alberta Conferences.
- Chile: The MCC program at Chile College was authorized by the federal government and cadets were inspected by the Chilean army's chief surgeon.
- Cuba: Red Cross classes and some MCC training may have been promoted in Cuba during World War II. The first MCC camp to be part of the denomination-wide program was held during Christmas break in 1951 at Antillian Junior College (now Antillean Adventist University) then located in Santa Clara.
- Dominican Republic: The first MCC camp in the Dominican Republic was held August 1951 at Santo Domingo under the direction Valentin Schoen, Lawrence A. Wheeler, Paul W. Kemper, and Chaplain E. A. Girado.
- Indonesia: Although there was interest in the MCC in Indonesia, activity was limited when American missionaries expressed concern related to communism.
- Japan: Everett Dick visited MCC units in Japan in 1953, 1955, and 1957.
- Mexico: Charles R. Taylor of Mexico City attended Camp Carlyle B. Haynes in 1950 and was commissioned second lieutenant.
- Philippines: During World War II, American missionaries inquired about MCC training. In the 1950s enthusiasm was unprecedented. The Philippines boasted more participation than any other nation. C. M. Sorenson directed the Philippine MCC program in the 1950s. Dick visited in 1953. When Dick sought memoirs and information about MCC history in 1983 in preparation for the MCC's 50th anniversary, he was surprised to learn the program was still active in the Philippines.
- Taiwan: Everett Dick visited MCC units in Japan in 1953, 1955, and 1957. In 1953 American military officers also visited the Taiwanese MCC camp.
- Singapore: Dr. James H. Nelson and James Wong led the MCC in Singapore after the government implemented national registration.
- Vietnam: In 1953, after Indochina began compulsory conscription, William H. Bergherm and Willis J. Hackett visited Saigon in order to implement a MCC training program.

== Philosophy ==
Motto

Serve, Serve, Serve

—

In Puerto Rico Cadets may be male or female and at least 16 years of age. They are trained and equipped to serve God and the community in order to provide aid during natural disasters or accidents. It organizes personnel and materials to provide spiritual and logistical aid. The program's motto is "Serve, Serve, Serve". The organization promotes spiritual growth for its members. In collaboration with the American Red Cross, medical training includes Cardiopulmonary resuscitation (CPR), advanced rescue, and preventive health and care among others. A regimen of physical training promotes mental and physical discipline in the cadets.

== Ranks ==
The Medical Cadet Corps uses a rank system based on that of the United States Army, complete with rank symbols; however, the enlisted ranks utilise yellow chevrons on green backgrounds, as opposed to the tan chevrons on olive backgrounds in use by the US Army today. Moreover, the rank symbols for colonel and above are gold, not silver.

Comparison of enlisted ranks of Medical Cadet Corps (MCC) and United States Army (USA)
MCC code	MCC rank	Rank insignia	USA rank	Uniformed services pay grade
E-1	Recruit	No insignia	Private	E-1
E-2	Private	One chevron	Private	E-2
E-3	Private First Class	One chevron and one rocker stripe	Private First Class	E-3
E-4	Corporal	Two chevrons	Corporal	E-4
E-5	Sergeant	Three chevrons	Sergeant	E-5
E-6	Staff Sergeant	Three chevrons and one rocker stripe	Staff Sergeant	E-6
E-7	Sergeant First Class	Three chevrons and two rocker stripes	Sergeant First Class	E-7
E-8	Master Sergeant	Three chevrons and three rocker stripes	Master Sergeant	E-8
E-9	First Sergeant	Three chevrons, lozenge "diamond" and three rocker stripes	First Sergeant	E-8
E-10	Sergeant Major	Three chevrons, five-pointed star and three rocker stripes	Sergeant Major	E-9
E-11	Command Sergeant Major	Three chevrons, star in crossed laurel wreaths and three rocker stripes	Command Sergeant Major	E-9
N/A	No rank	Three chevrons, Achievement Great Seal and three rocker stripes	Sergeant Major of the Army	E-9
N/A	No rank	Three chevrons, eagle gripping three arrows surrounded by four stars, and three rocker stripes	Senior Enlisted Advisor to the Chairman	E-9

The Medical Cadet Corps uses the same five warrant officer codes, ranks and insignias as the United States Army.

Comparison of officer ranks of Medical Cadet Corps (MCC) and United States Army (USA)
MCC rank	MCC insignia	USA insignia	USA rank
2nd Lieutenant	One gold bar	One gold bar	Second Lieutenant
1st Lieutenant	One silver bar	One silver bar	First Lieutenant
Captain	Two silver bars	Two silver bars	Captain
Major	Gold oak leaf	Gold oak leaf	Major
Lieutenant Colonel	Silver oak leaf	Silver oak leaf	Lieutenant Colonel
Colonel	Eagle with olive branch and arrows in talons, head facing olive branch, all in gold	Eagle with olive branch and arrows in talons, head facing olive branch, all in silver	Colonel
Conference Director	One gold star	One silver star	Brigadier General
Union Director	Two gold stars	Two silver stars	Major General
Division Director	Three gold stars	Three silver stars	Lieutenant General
General Conference Associate Director/Departmental Director	Four gold stars	Four silver stars	General
General Conference Director	Five gold stars	Five silver stars	General of the Army

== Emblems ==
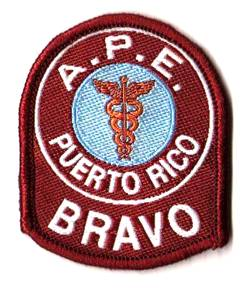

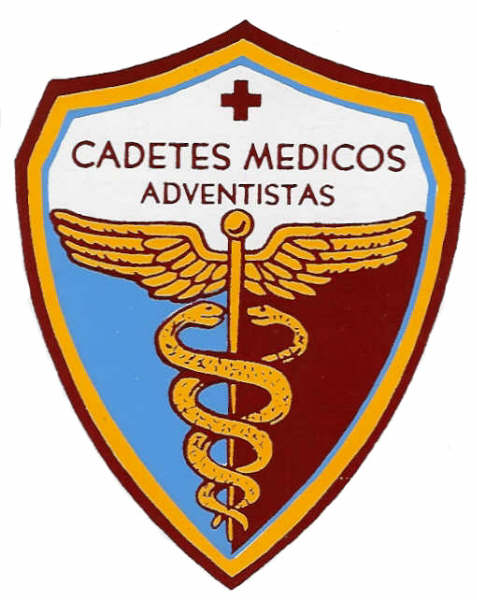

== Bibliography ==
- Berg, Thomas Harold. "The Seventh-Day Adventist Medical Cadet Corps, 1934-1945: Reconciling War, Conscience, and Noncombatancy." University of Nebraska, 1990.
- Berry, Vernon E. "First Medical Cadet Camp in Santo Domingo." Inter-American Division Messenger 28, no. 11 (December 1951): 4.
- Davis, Roger G. "Conscientious Cooperators: The Seventh-day Adventists and Military Service, 1860-1945." Ph.D., George Washington University, 1970.
- Dick, Everett N. "The Adventist Medical Cadet Corps as Seen by its Founder." Adventist Heritage 1 no. 2 (July 1974): 18-27.
- Dick, Everett N. "The Military Chaplaincy and Seventh-day Adventists: The Evolution of an Attitude," Adventist Heritage 3 no. 1 (Summer 1976): 33-45
- Hicks, John D. "Everett Dick: Teacher, Scholar, Churchman." In People of the plains and mountains: Essays in the history of the West dedicated to Everett Dick. Edited by Ray A. Billington, 3–20. Contributions in American History no.25. Westport, CT: Greenwood Press, 1973.
- "Inter-America Issues First Cadet Officers Commissions." Inter-American Division Messenger 28 no. 5 (May 1, 1951): 2.
- Knight, George R. "The Great Disappearance: Adventism and Noncombatancy." Journal of Adventist Education 70 no. 3 (February/March 2008): 11-14. Accessed March 17, 2014.
- Leon, Merardo. "Tidings from Chile College." South American Bulletin 29 no. 2 (March 1, 1954): 2–3. Accessed July 26, 2015.
- Maas, Ellis R. "Medical Cadets in the Austral Union." South American Bulletin 20, no. 2 (April 1, 1944): 6–7.
- Mole, Robert L. God Also Loves Military People. General Conference of Seventh-day Adventists, 1977.
- Schlabach, Theron F. and Richard T. Hughes, editors. Proclaim Peace: Christian Pacifism From Unexpected Quarters. Urbana, IL: Univ. of Illinois, 1997.
- Schwarz, R. W. Light Bearers to the Remnant. Boise, ID: Pacific Press, 1979.
- Tillman, A. M. "Medical Cadets in the South American Division." South American Bulletin 23 no. 2 (March 1, 1948): 4.
- Union College. "Union College Heritage Collections: Medical Cadet Corps." Accessed August 5, 2015.
- Walker, H. E. "For God and Country." South American Bulletin 30 no. 5 (September 1, 1955): 6–7.
- Wallace, E. H. "Medical Cadet Corps in Saigon." Far Eastern Division Outlook 39, no. 12 (December 1953): 5–6.
- Wilcox, Francis McLellan. Seventh-day Adventists in Time of War. Takoma Park, MD: Review and Herald Publishing Association, 1936.

== See also ==
- Seventh-day Adventist Church
- Pathfinders
- Pathfinders (Seventh-day Adventist)
- Adventurers
- Military Service
- American Red Cross
- Conscription in the United States
