= American Boy Scouts =

Early Scouting organization

American Boy Scout
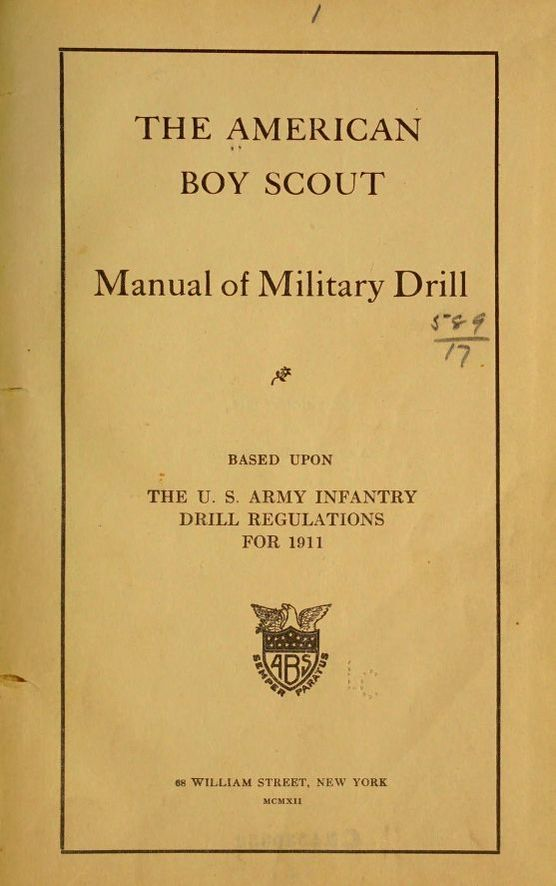
- American Boy Scout manual c. 1911

- American Boy Scouts Emblem
- Headquarters: New York City
- Country: United States
- Founded: June 1910
- Defunct: 1920s
- Founder: William Randolph Hearst
- Membership: 17,000 at peak
- Affiliation: Order of World Scouts 1911-1912

The American Boy Scouts (ABS) (officially American Boy Scout), later the United States Boy Scouts (officially United States Boy Scout), was an early American Scouting organization formed by William Randolph Hearst in 1910, following on from the formation of the Scouting movement by Robert Baden-Powell between 1903 and 1907. Near the end of its existence, the organization also used the names American Cadets and U.S. Junior Military Forces.

The ABS was the rival of the Boy Scouts of America (BSA) similar to the situation in the United Kingdom with Baden Powell's Boy Scouts and the British Boys Scouts who did not like the militarism of early British Scouting. For the most part, there were minor differences between the ABS and the BSA.

ABS Motto

Semper Paratus
Always prepared

Among the objectives of the organization was to prepare boys for the obligations and duties of citizenship.

== History ==
Scout Oath

On my honor, I will do my best To do my duty to God and my country. To help other people at all times. To obey the Scout Law.

Scout Law

A Scout's honor is to be trusted. A scout is loyal to his country, his officers, his parents and his employers. A scout's duty is to be useful and to help others. A scout is a friend to all and a brother to every other scout no matter to what social class the other belongs. A scout must never be a snob. A scout is courteous. A scout is a friend to animals. A scout obeys orders of his parents, patrol leader, or scout master without question. A scout smiles and whistles under all circumstances. A scout is thrifty. A scout is the protector of girls and women at all times — and he holds this a sacred duty

In May 1910, Hearst called an organizational meeting to form a new Scouting group. Hearst was aware of the Boy Scouts of America, formed months earlier by the rival publisher William D. Boyce, but pursued his own vision of Scouting and incorporated the ABS in June 1910 in New York along with James F. McGrath and James R. O'Beirne. Edgar M. Robinson and Ernest Seton requested that Hearst unite the ABS with the BSA but were rejected. In June 1910, the ABS started organizing the Department of New England which was operational in August or September under Chief Department Scout General William H. Oakes. Additional departments were also formed: Atlantic (New York City), Middle West (Chicago), Northwest (San Francisco), and Southwest (Los Angeles). The national committee members were also the officers of the Atlantic Department with Hearst as president, Jefferson M. Levy first vice president, Charles P. Devare second vice president, James R. O'Beirne treasurer and James F. McGrath secretary. The honorary vice presidents and founders included Col John Jacob Astor IV, William Kissam Vanderbilt II, Major General Fred D. Grant, Lieutenant General Nelson A. Miles, General Edwin A. McAlpin, and Lieutenant General Adna R. Chaffee. The American Boy Scouts of Rhode Island was founded by Charles E. Mulhearn on August 29, 1910, with the meeting of an executive committee. The next day, the Rhode Island committee requested a charter from the ABS New England Department Headquarters.

Hearst had conflicts with the ABS directors over the methods of financing and the improper and unauthorized use of his name for the solicitation of money. He also expressed his disdain at fundraisers being allowed to keep 40% of funds raised without his knowledge. Hearst and other leaders resigned in December 1910. General James O'Beirne, the ABS treasurer, replaced Hearst as president. Hearst referred the matter to the District Attorney which the organization claimed was over Hearst's dismissal. A grand jury was formed and the ABS indicated that they would sue Hearst for making a false statement.

Citing ABS mismanagement, the New England Division left the ABS in 1910 and formed the New England Boy Scouts. On March 12, 1911, the Rhode Island group voted to break away from the American Boy Scouts and formed the Rhode Island Boy Scouts.

The ABS joined the Order of World Scouts in 1911. In August 1911, General Edwin A. McAlpin was elected national president and Chief Scout.

In March 1912, an ABS Scout in uniform shot and killed a boy with a rifle after a Scout function.

Remington Arms designed the 4S Boy Scout Rifle and advertised it as the "Official Rifle of the American Boy Scouts" and sold it from 1913 to 1914.

=== United States Boy Scout ===
The American Boy Scouts were often confused with the Boy Scouts of America, which sometimes caused problems with fundraising and misattributed publicity. The ABS board of directors voted in October 1913 to change the name of the organization to the United States Boy Scout (USBS), primarily to prevent the confusion.

The USBS claimed to be a military-style organization, which was in contrast to the non-military BSA. The USBS performed military style drills with rifles and sold war bonds during World War I.

In 1915, BSA President Colin H. Livingstone claimed that the USBS carried guns as part of the program. In 1916, the USBS sought but did not receive a federal charter. After the BSA received a federal charter in 1916, Chief Scout Executive James E. West pressed the USBS to change its name without success. The BSA filed a lawsuit for an injunction order to restrain the USBS from using the term "Boy Scout" in 1917. L.W. Amerman, executive officer and treasurer, acknowledged that the USBS was a more military organization than the BSA. It was also alleged that the USBS had used the names of prominent men on its letterhead, such as Elbert Henry Gary, in their fundraising efforts without permission and that donations or endorsements were made to the USBS in the mistaken belief that they were the BSA.

The BSA was represented by Charles Evans Hughes, former Governor of New York and former U.S. Supreme Court Justice. Testimony included an affidavit from Robert Baden-Powell, founder of the international Scout Movement, on the origins of the Scout Movement. In 1919, the New York Supreme Court, a trial court, granted the BSA an injunction and the USBS was barred from using the terms "Boy Scout", "Scout", "Scouting", or any variation thereof.

=== Dissolution ===
The organization changed its name and carried on for a few more years as the American Cadets and the U.S. Junior Military Forces before finally dissolving.
