= Rhode Island Boy Scouts =

- Location: Rhode Island
- Country: United States
- Founded: August 29, 1910
- Founder: Col. Charles E. Mulhearn
- Membership: 1200 (10/1911)
- Affiliation: American Boy Scouts (1910-1911); Boy Scouts of America (1917-present)

The Rhode Island Boy Scouts (RIBS), was an early American Scouting organization that split off from the American Boy Scouts in 1910 and merged with the Boy Scouts of America (BSA) in 1917. RIBS still exists as a trustee organization.

== History ==
The American Boy Scouts of Rhode Island was founded by Charles E. Mulhearn on August 29, 1910 with the meeting of an executive committee. The next day, the committee requested a charter from the New England Department Headquarters of the American Boy Scouts. At a September 8, 1910 executive committee meeting, the organization selected its first officers. On March 12, 1911, the organization voted to break away from the American Boy Scouts and was renamed as the Rhode Island Boy Scouts. The State issued a state charter to the RIBS as a state institution.

In 1917 RIBS merged with the BSA granting all members of RIBS back service.

RIBS kept its corporate identity after the merger allowing it to continue receiving bequests, funds, and properties. RIBS owns many of the properties operated by Narragansett Council with the exceptions of Cachalot Scout Reservation, acquired through a 2002 merger with Moby Dick Council and Camp Norse which was acquired in 2015 through a merger with Annawon Council.

== Chief officers ==
Chief Scout

- Charles E. Mulhearn (September 6, 1910 - April 12, 1911)
- Charles Wheaton Abbot Jr. (March 12, 1911 - March 10, 1912)
- Harry Culter (March 10, 1912 -)

Chief Commissioner

- G. Edward Buxton (September 6, 1910 – April 12, 1911)
- John R. Rathom (April 12, 1911 - 1917)
