= New England Boy Scouts =

American Scouting organization

- Country: United States
- Founded: 1910
- Defunct: c. 1916

The New England Boy Scouts (NEBS) was an early American Scouting organization that split off from the American Boy Scouts in 1910 and merged with the Boy Scouts of America by 1916.

== History ==
The American Boy Scouts were organized in May 1910 by publisher William Randolph Hearst. In June 1910, the ABS started organizing the Department of New England which was operational in August or September under chief department scout General William H. Oakes. In December 1910, Hearst resigned, citing mismanagement on the part of the ABS directors. The New England Division left the ABS at the same time and formed the New England Boy Scouts.

NEBS member George S. Barton, of Somerville, Massachusetts, founded Boys' Life magazine in January 1911. The magazine covered the three Scouting organizations of the time: the Boy Scouts of America, the American Boy Scouts and the New England Boy Scouts. In 1912, the Boy Scouts of America purchased the magazine, making it an official BSA magazine.

The NEBS merged into the BSA in 1916.
