= Edgar M. Robinson =

Edgar Robinson
- Born: Edgar Munroe Robinson

Edgar Munroe Robinson (1867–1951) was Boys' Work Secretary of the International Committee of the YMCA and a long-time director and executive with the YMCA in New York. He is notable for his significant efforts in helping to establish the Boy Scouts of America (BSA).

== YMCA ==
Edgar M. Robinson attended college in New Brunswick, Canada. There he first became associated with the YMCA serving as chairman of the Boys' Work Committee and later developing their first camping program. In 1898, he was hired as the Boys' Work Secretary by the Massachusetts-Rhode Island State Committee.

While working for the YMCA in Massachusetts he attended the YMCA Training School, now Springfield College. Robinson was appointed the Boys' Work Secretary of the International Committee in 1900. According to one history, "at the time, there were twenty Boys' Work Secretaries and 30,000 boys as members nationwide. Thirteen years later, there were 363 secretaries with over 120,000 youth in membership." Robinson developed camping programs, father and son programs, sex education programs, specialized work with employed boys and wartime programs."

== Boy Scouts of America ==
During the years 1908 and 1909, Scout troops were starting almost spontaneously in locations across the United States, before the BSA existed, but following the publication of Scouting for Boys by Sir Robert Baden-Powell. A handful of YMCA centers were hosting troops, so Edgar Robinson had an interest in helping the BSA get off the ground so that his organization and others would have American-based resources for troop leaders.

In April 1910, Edgar Robinson persuaded William D. Boyce to appoint him managing director of the BSA for a limited time period, during which time Robinson secured a number of leading citizens to join together to form the Executive Board of the BSA. He then relinquished his role in BSA affairs, with the executive role eventually going to the newly recruited James E. West.

Robinson was recognized for his work in establishing the BSA with the Silver Buffalo Award in 1926.

Robinson remained "the preeminent figure in YMCA boys' work until his retirement in 1927." In 2000 he was inducted into the YMCA Hall of Fame at Springfield College.

== See also ==
- History of the Boy Scouts of America
