= Evangelical Council for Financial Accountability =

American Christian financial standards regulator

- Abbreviation: ECFA
- Formation: 1979
- Type: NGO
- Legal status: Association
- Purpose: Provide accreditation for Christian non-profits and churches which demonstrate compliance with established financial standards.
- Location: Winchester, Virginia
- Region served: US
- Services: Accreditation for financial standards compliance by members
- Members: 2,700
- Website: Official website

The Evangelical Council for Financial Accountability (ECFA) is an American financial standards association representing Evangelical Christian organizations and churches, which qualify for tax-exempt, nonprofit status and receive tax-deductible contributions. Founded in 1979, ECFA accredits over 2,700 member organizations which have demonstrated compliance with its financial standards. As of 2022, the collective annual revenue of ECFA member organizations is reported to be nearly $34 billion.

The organization has, since its inception, been based in the Washington, D.C. area with offices presently in Winchester, Virginia.

== History ==
In 1977, Senator Mark Hatfield, who since 1973 had been a member of the board of World Vision, told evangelicals that they needed to formalize some means for financial accountability or government legislation would be required. At the same time, Texas Congressman Charles Wilson had drafted a bill that would have required ministries to disclose "at the point of solicitation." A group of representatives from more than thirty evangelical groups met in December of that year to formulate a plan. At that meeting, Hatfield's chief legislative assistant told them that "a voluntary disclosure program" would "preclude the necessity of federal intervention into the philanthropic and religious sector." The call for more regulation was also a reaction to public pressure caused by several media reports about scandals related to misuse of funds in charities.

In 1979, the ECFA was founded by the Billy Graham Evangelistic Association and the US branch of World Vision (World Vision International is not a member of ECFA). World Vision's president Stan Mooneyham stated, "There is no denying that this threat of government action was one of the stimuli" for the founding of the ECFA.

ECFA was founded with the establishment of seven standards of accountability that covered board governance, the requirement for audited financial statements, the requirement for public disclosure of the audited financial statements, the avoidance of conflicts of interest, and standards regarding fundraising activities. It was believed that the proposed standards of accountability generally exceeded the requirements of law. Charities that met those standards and paid the membership fee were granted a seal of approval. Membership fees were based on donated income. Evangelical charities could apply for accreditation and were required to submit information that would be reviewed and evaluated against those standards. Those meeting the standards would be accredited and granted a seal of approval.

== Membership ==
The ECFA members are organized charities in the US, typically 501(c)3 Evangelical nonprofits and churches. Members range "from evangelism in foreign jungles to race car driver evangelism, from ministry to the elderly, children, the impaired, to those in the military, those on the streets, and to many in between. All members are fulfilling a calling to reach a lost world for Christ. ECFA members are located across the U.S. and U.S. territories and range from the very large national ministries to smaller local ministries and churches."

Members are required to annually submit a renewal document which includes the recent copy of the audited financial statement (some smaller organizations are allowed to send in reviewed or compiled statements) and answers to a number of questions related to the membership standards.

== Integrity standards ==
As an accrediting organization, ECFA provides a seal of approval to those members who adhere to Seven Standards of Responsible Stewardship(TM) (Standard 7 is divided into five sub-standards).

Voluntary resignations, mergers, and dissolutions are frequent reasons for terminations. However, ECFA's list of former members also includes terminations for failure to provide information or fully comply with the standards. A notable former member is Gospel For Asia (one of EFCA's charter members), whose membership was terminated in October 2015 after allegations of donation misuse.

In a 2004 survey, ECFA was seen by respondents as an effective accreditation program that provided assurance of financial propriety for its members.

== Commission on Accountability and Policy for Religious Organizations ==
In January 2011, Senator Charles Grassley (R-IA), a member of the Senate Finance Committee, asked ECFA to facilitate responses from the ministry community concerning a series of legislative proposals prepared by his staff. ECFA formed the Commission on Accountability and Policy for Religious Organizations to assist in this process. The Commission included a variety of religious representatives, including Judaism and Islam. In addition to the religious panel, there was also a legal panel, and a non-profit panel.

In April 2011, ECFA named members to the commission.

ECFA was the sponsor and host for the commission and responsible for the logistical costs of the commission. Public contributions were solicited in support of the commission's activities.

The commission has produced two reports; one addressing the original financial issues, the second related to government control of religious speech touching on the political realm.

- Enhancing Accountability For The Religious and Broader Nonprofit Sector
- Government Regulation of Political Speech by Religious and Other 501 (c)(3) Organizations

== See also ==
- American Institute of Philanthropy
- Trinity Forum
