= Diamond Dick =

Fictional character

- Diamond Dick, Jr. #601 [1908-04-18].
- Created by: William B. Schwartz

In-universe information
- Gender: Male

Diamond Dick is a fictional character created by William B. Schwartz. He first appeared in "Dashing Diamond Dick; or, The Sarpint of Siskiyou County", a serialized novel that began in Street and Smith's story paper New York Weekly (Vol. 33, No. 21) on April 8, 1878, by Schwartz, writing under the pseudonym "Delta Calaveras." According to J. Randolph Cox, "the character was undoubtedly inspired by the life and career of herbal-medicine promoter and showman George B. McClellan (ca. 1858–1911), who went by the nickname "Diamond Dick" and was the hero of "Diamond Dick, the Dandy from Denver" by "Buckskin Sam" Hall in Beadle & Adams' New York Dime Library (Vol. 16, No. 199), published on August 16, 1882.

The character later had a regular series in Nugget Library, with No. 16, December 12, 1889. The real name of Schwartz's character was Richard Wade. His son, Bertie Wade, was known as Diamond Dick, Jr. The series was known for occurring in real time. The characters aged and the world changed (i.e. new technologies such as cars were introduced). Dick was famous for wearing diamond-studded clothes. He was described as handsome, and had dark hair and moustache.

The original serials were signed Delta Calaveras, and the later weekly stories by the house name W. B. Lawson. Research suggests Theodore Dreiser may have written some stories and served as editor. George C. Jenks also wrote under this name, as did St George Henry Rathbone.

== Appearances ==
- Scranton Republican (Scranton, PA) April 3, 1878
- Columbian & Democrat (Bloomsburg, PA) April 5, 1878
- New York Weekly April 8, 1878; 1880
- New York Dime Library August 16, 1882
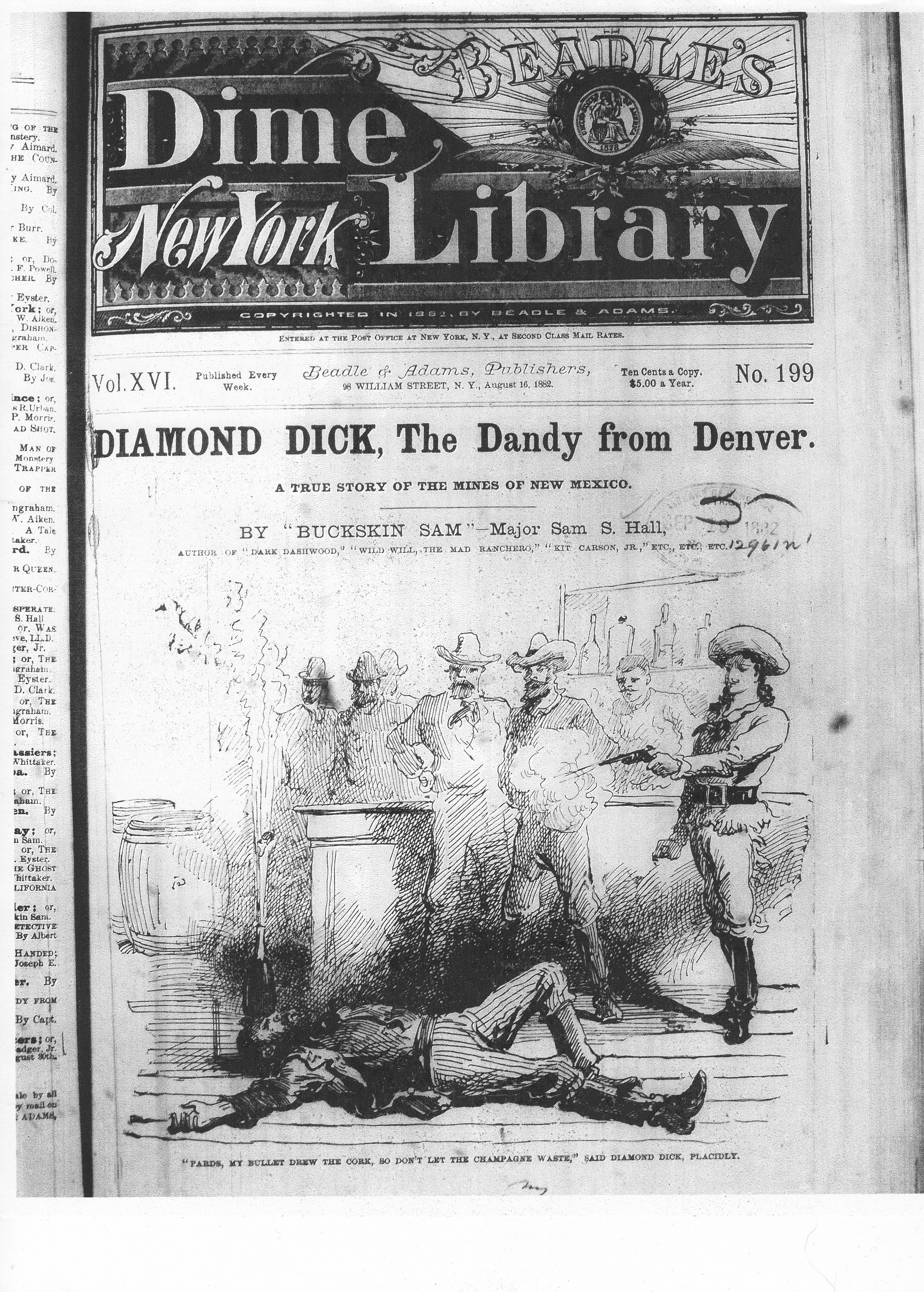
- Diamond Dick Library Nos. 158–205, 1895–1896
- Diamond Dick Weekly Nos. 1–373, 1896–1903
- Diamond Dick, Jr. Weekly Nos. 374–762, 1903–1911
- Diamond Dick Quarterly Nos. 1–5, 1897–1899
- Nugget Library regular series beginning with No. 16, 1889
- Aldine Tip Top Tales (British reprints, beginning late 1890s)
- Great Western Library 1927

== Adaptation ==
In 2018, Radio Theater Project of Mount Vernon, WA hired Barry M. Putt, Jr. to adapt the dime novel series into an audio drama program entitled Richard Wade, U.S. Marshal. The show amassed thousands of listeners and can be heard on all major podcast platforms including Spotify, iTunes, Google Podcasts, and Audible. It was in the top-ten most listened to series for over two months when it debuted on the streaming service Dramafy. The Mutual Audio Network distributes the show in the U.S., Canada, Europe, and Asia. Season one of the show premiered in 2018. Season two premiered in 2020. Season three premiered in 2023. Season four will premiere in 2026 and feature a special Christmas-themed bonus episode.
Episodes include:

SEASON 1 (2018)
1: ON A BAFFLING TRAIL
Baldy Sours is after the secret cache of Ivory. Richard Wade is out to stop him.

2: A CLOSE CALL IN CUSTER'S CANYON
Everybody is looking for the notorious outlaw Red Ferg, including Richard Wade US Marshal.

3: THE HORNET FROM HACKENSACK
A con artist who can hypnotize people is on the loose.

4: THE CLAIM JUMPER
Richard Wade is on vacation doing a little gold panning. When's jumped by claim jumpers. He is helped by an unlikely ally.

5: SHOWDOWN IN CANYON CITY
From train robbery to burning down a granary Milt Winslow is terrorizing the local farmers.

6: IN THE OIL FIELDS
Richard Wade investigates possible corruption in the Texas oil industry.

SEASON 2 (2020)
7: DESPERADOS IN DEATH VALLEY
Richard Wade helps a friend track down a murderous outlaw.

8: DEATH RIDE
The marshal pursues a counterfeit operation that is set to destroy the town’s economy.

9: MYSTERY OF MINESHAFT NUMBER 3
Richard Wade and his deputy uncover a dark secret in a rural mining community.

10: SEARCH FOR BILLY ARMSTRONG
Richard Wade searches for a friend’s long-lost son.

11: DEATH TRAIL
Richard Wade and Jim hunt for a criminal who wreaks havoc everywhere he goes.

12: FRIENDS AND FOES
The marshal and deputy are set up to take the fall for some deceptive men who plan to take over Lyons economy.

SEASON 3 (2023)
13: HELPING AN OLD FRIEND
The marshal and deputy help an old friend when his property is stolen.

14: MANHUNT IN THE COLORADO WOODS
Richard Wade and Jim join a state-wide manhunt in search of a ruthless gang of thieves.

15: THE DRENIN BROTHERS
Richard Wade battles the nomadic criminals, the Drenin brothers.

16: THE MARAUDERS
The marshal and deputy set out to stop the infamous Emmettson Gang when they wreak havoc across the state.

17: A CASE FROM THE PAST
Richard Wade and Jim reexamine a case that was closed years ago.

18: TROUBLE IN FORT COLLINS
The marshal searches for an escaped prisoner.

SEASON 4 (2026)
TBA
