= Boyce Building =

Office skyscraper in Chicago, Illinois

- U.S. National Register of Historic Places
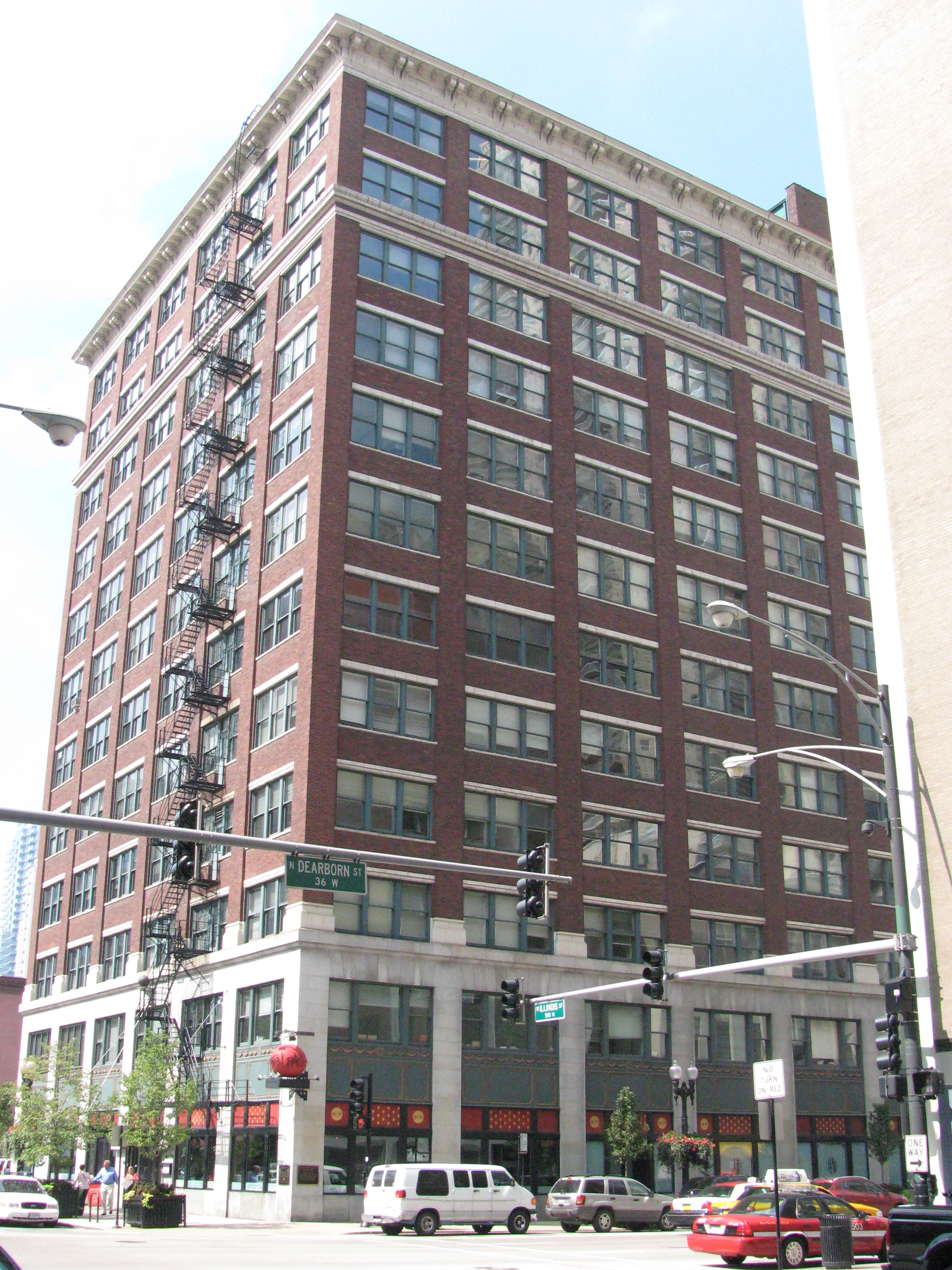

- Location within Chicago metropolitan area Location within Illinois Location within the United States
- Location: 500--510 N. Dearborn St., Chicago, Illinois
- Coordinates: 41°53′28″N 87°37′48″W
- Area: 0.3 acres (0.12 ha)
- Built: 1915
- Architect: Daniel H. Burnham & Co., Christian A. Eckstrom
- Architectural style: Classical Revival, Chicago, Commercial Style
- NRHP reference No.: 96000080
- Added to NRHP: February 29, 1996

The Boyce Building is a historic building in Chicago, Illinois, associated with William D. Boyce and his publishing house, which catered to small towns. The building was also the headquarters of his Lone Scouts of America.

== Architecture ==
The Boyce Building is a twelve-story office building clad in light gray Vermont granite and red brick. The steel-framed structure is on the northwest corner of Dearborn and Illinois Streets on Chicago's Near North Side. It was built in three phases from 1911 to 1923. Boyce commissioned Daniel H. Burnham & Co. to design the building in 1911. Plans were made to expand it to a ten-story structure, but this never happened. A four-story section of the building was built in 1912 north of another building housing Boyce's offices. The older building was then demolished, and the second portion of the four-story building was completed in 1914. The basement had a power plant and the first floor housed five printing presses and a mail room. The building could manufacture 180,000 papers per hour at full capacity.

Christian A. Eckstrom designed an eight-story expansion in 1921, completed in 1923. Eckstrom adopted some of Burnham's plan, but eliminated his mansard roof, making a more cohesive though less intricate building. A terra cotta cornice was removed in the 1980s.

== History ==
William D. Boyce was born in Pennsylvania and grew up in a rural town. He moved to Chicago in 1881, where he gained experience in sales and publishing. He briefly moved to Winnipeg, Manitoba, where he co-founded The Commercial, then found a job as a reporter in Fargo, North Dakota. In 1882, he moved to nearby Lisbon, North Dakota, and founded the Dakota Clipper weekly newspaper. During the 1884 World Cotton Centennial, Boyce worked at the Bureau of Correspondence, which provided news from the fair to 1200 member newspapers across the nation. He sold his interest in the Clipper in 1885 and returned to Chicago with an interest in small-town news.

Boyce partnered with R. R. Donnelley to found a print service for small-town newspapers. These "ready print" stories catered to the interest of small-town readers, but were of higher quality than most towns could otherwise afford. He convinced Donnelley and two other partners to found a national weekly newspaper to cater to these audiences, the Saturday Blade. First published in June 1887, Boyce soon purchased the shares of his partners and managed the paper as the W. D. Boyce Publishing Company. Boyce purchased a story paper, the Chicago Ledger, in 1891. He consolidated his publishing interests into one building 1907. Boyce distributed his papers through a network of paperboys. At its peak in the 1910s, his agency was associated with 30,000 boys throughout the United States and Canada.

While in London for business, Boyce happened across a Boy Scout. He sought out the leader of the organization, Robert Baden-Powell, and became interested in their practices. When he returned to Chicago, he founded a national chapter, the Boy Scouts of America. He agreed to turn over control of the organization to the Y.M.C.A. soon thereafter. He intended to continue to finance and print Boys' Life from his printing house, but the Y.M.C.A. refused. Though Boyce's affiliation with the Boy Scouts was brief, he soon founded a companion organization, the Lone Scouts of America. The Lone Scouts focused on Boyce's target audience—small town residents—which had been largely ignored by the burgeoning Boy Scout chapter. He published its magazine, Lone Scout, at the Boyce Building. By 1919, there were 300,000 Lone Scouts in 4,600 "tribes". However, the diminishing isolation felt in small town America by the 1920s due to improved technology and infrastructure caused a reduction in Lone Scout enrollment.

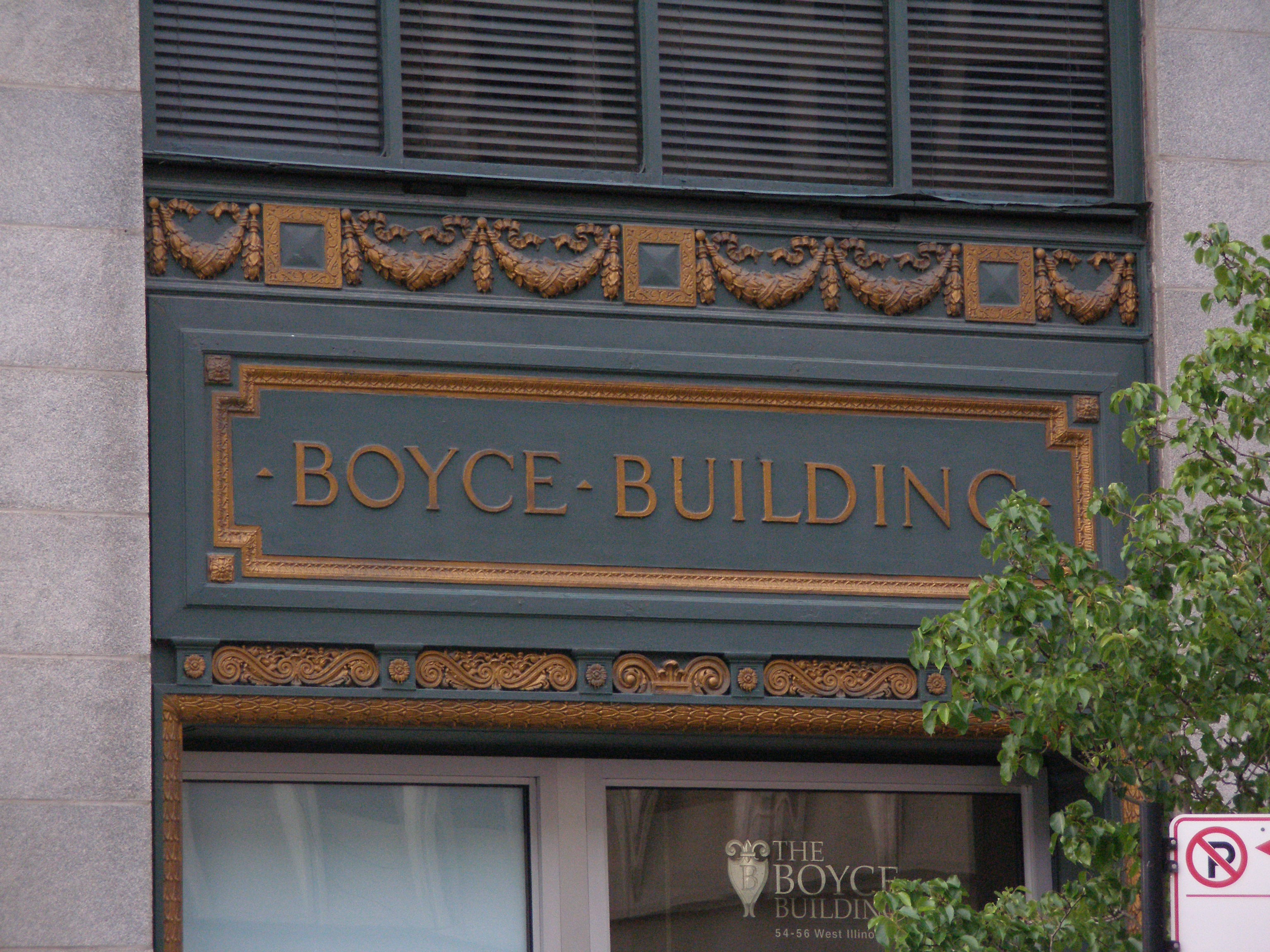
Entrance

The original Boyce Building was only four stories tall, even though the original plan was to build ten. The extra space was intended for lease, but Boyce did not see the need for additional income at the time. Now more financially strapped, Boyce commissioned the construction of the rest of his namesake building in 1921, completed two years later. The Lone Scouts were merged into the Boy Scouts in 1924. Boyce died in his penthouse on the top floor of the Boyce Building on June 11, 1929. The Boyce Building is the only remaining building associated with his publishing and scouting career. Earlier publishing buildings at 116 and 215 Dearborn, as well as an earlier office building at 32 North Dearborn, have been demolished. Both of Boyce's houses have been destroyed; only his hunting lodge at South Dakota's Fort Sisseton Historic State Park, which was not associated with his scouting or publishing interests, remains. The main period of significance for the building is 1912, when the first four-story portion was completed, to 1929, when Boyce died. The building was recognized by the National Park Service with a listing on the National Register of Historic Places on February 29, 1996. Current tenants include New Chicago Consulting LLC, Valerio Dewalt Train, and the Chicago Humanities Festival, among others.

== See also ==
Friedman Properties web page for The Boyce Building
