= W. B. Lawson =

W. B. Lawson was a house pseudonym used for some of the stories of Diamond Dick and Diamond Dick Jr.

Among the authors using the name were:

- St George Henry Rathborne
- George C. Jenks
- Theodore Dreiser
