= Lone Scouts =

Scout movement members who are isolated

Lone Scouts are members of the Scout movement who undertake scout activities on their own or by distance communication, usually because they live in isolated areas or otherwise do not participate in scout activities with other scouts. A Lone Scout may have an adult Scout leader or counselor who may instruct and supervise them. They can follow the same program as other Scouts and may advance in the same way as all other Scouts.

Lone Scouts exist in many countries in the world, including Australia, the United Kingdom, Canada and the United States.

== History ==
John Hargrave was the inspirator of the Lone Scouts. Hargrave wrote a series of articles for "Lone Scouts", held Lonecraft Camps and wrote Lonecraft, the handbook for Lone Scouts, published in 1913. Hargrave's book referred to individual Lone Scouts and Lone Patrols. Hargrave dedicated his book to naturalist Ernest Thompson Seton, founder of the Woodcraft League. Hargrave was an early Boy Scout and, in 1917, became Commissioner for Woodcraft and Camping in the Baden-Powell Boy Scouts but Baden-Powell and his organization refused to recognize Hargrave's Lone Scouts and Woodcraft Scouting. Hargrave, a Quaker pacifist and medical corps war veteran of the disastrous 1915 Gallipoli Campaign, became increasingly disenchanted with the military dominated leadership and militarism of the Baden-Powell Boy Scouts and in February, 1919, he held a meeting of like-minded Scout leaders. In 1920 Hargrave formed the Kindred of the Kibbo Kift and in January 1921 he was expelled from Baden-Powell's organization. Many Lone Scouts disassociated from the Baden-Powell organization, some joined Hargrave's Kibbo Kift while others joined the British Boy Scouts, other National Peace Scouts or remained independent Scouts and patrols.

The term "Lone Scout" was later officially adopted by Baden-Powell's Boy Scouts Association.

The Lone Scouts of America were formed in 1915 by William D. Boyce, a Chicago newspaper entrepreneur. This organization merged with the Boy Scouts of America in 1924; its mission has been carried on through the BSA Lone Cub Scout and Lone Boy Scout programs.

== US criteria ==
Lone Star Program

Youth in the USA who are eligible to become Lone Scouts include:

- Children of American citizens who live abroad
- Exchange students away from the United States for a year or more
- Children with disabilities that might prevent them from attending regular meetings of packs or troops
- Children in rural communities who live far from a Scouting unit
- Sons/Daughters of migrant farmworkers
- Children who attend night schools or boarding schools
- Children who have jobs that conflict with troop meetings
- Children whose families travel frequently, such as circus families, families who live on boats, missionaries, etc.
- Children who alternate living arrangements with parents who live in different communities
- Children who are unable to attend unit meetings because of life-threatening communicable diseases
- Children whose parents believe their child might be endangered by getting to Scout unit meetings
- Children who are being home schooled and whose parents do not want them spending time with other children in a youth group.

== See also ==
- Lone Guides
- Lone Scouts of America
