= Dave Dashaway =

Juvenile book series

Dave Dashaway (series)
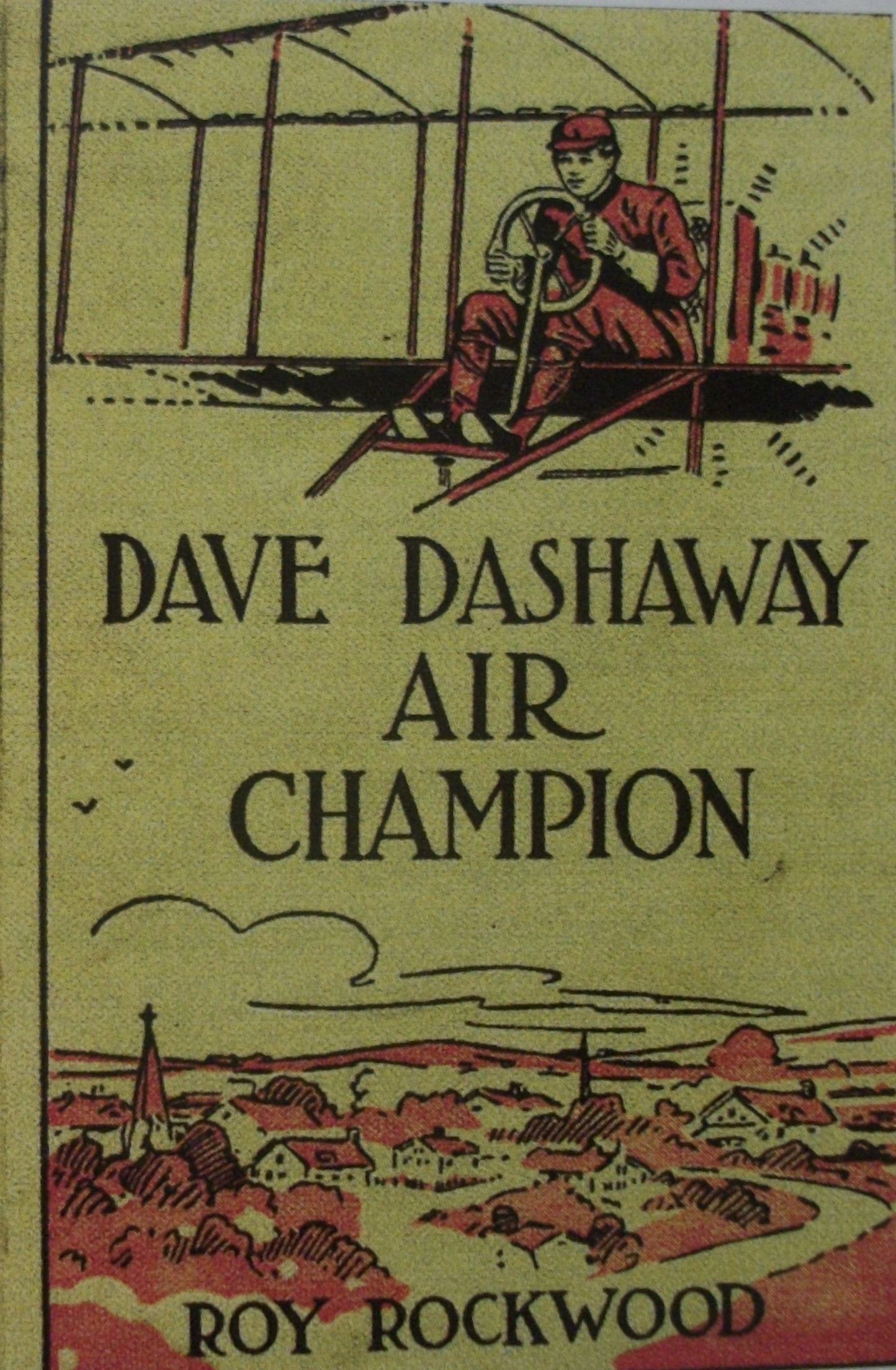
- Author: Weldon J. Cobb writing as Roy Rockwood
- Language: English
- Genre: Juvenile adventure
- Publisher: Cupples & Leon
- Publication date: 1913-1915
- Publication place: United States

Dave Dashaway was a series of juvenile aviation novels written for the Stratemeyer Syndicate by Weldon J. Cobb, using the pseudonym of Roy Rockwood. The series was published by Cupples & Leon from 1913 to 1915. The hardback books had a picture printed onto the front cover, plus a black and white frontispiece illustration.

Advertising shows that the series was being sold until at least 1935.

== Series preparation ==
In May 1912 Edward Stratemeyer wrote to Weldon J. Cobb and sent him outlines of the first two volumes of a new book series. Stratemeyer stated "We want bright, up to date stories, but free from sensationalism. I would like you to give some information about flying machines in general, monoplanes, biplanes, etc., but not mention any particular makes, no manufacturers, no aviators, as we do not care to advertise anybody." He also advised the writer to buy Aircraft and Fly magazines, as well as “some practical book on flying machines and flying."

== Series synopsis ==
Dave is the orphaned son of a famous balloonist, and the lad was forced to live with a cruel guardian. He runs away from his guardian, finds work as an airport handyman, studies flying with famed aviator Robert King, and is hired as a pilot for Interstate Aero Company. Dave befriends Hiram Hobbs, who becomes his assistant, and the series "obligatory sidekick."

== Series titles ==
The aviation series contains the following titles:

- Dave Dashaway, the Young Aviator: or, In the Clouds For Fame and Fortune - 1913
- Dave Dashaway, and His Hydroplane; or, Daring Adventures Over the Great Lakes - 1913
- Dave Dashaway, and His Giant Airship; or, A Marvellious Trip Across the Atlantic - 1913
- Dave Dashaway, Around the World; or, A Young Yankee Aviator Among Many Nations - 1913
- Dave Dashaway, Air Champion; or, Wizard Work In the Clouds - 1915
