= George C. Jenks =

American dime novelist

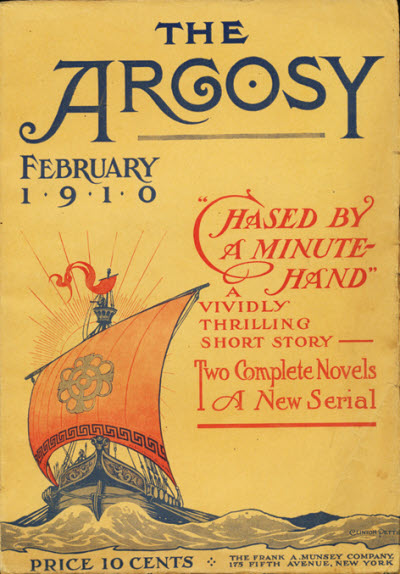
Jenks's "Chased by a Minute-Hand" was the cover story for the February 1910 issue of The Argosy

George Charles Jenks (13 April 1850 - 13 September 1929) was an English-born American dime novelist. Among others he wrote as part of the Nick Carter stable. He also wrote Diamond Dick stories as W. B. Lawson, and is credited as the creator of the character.

Jenks was born in London and worked as an apprentice to a printer. He later emigrated to United States in 1872 and continued his trade, before becoming a reporter with the Pittsburgh Press in 1882. He began writing his first dime novels in 1886. He also authored the script to the musical burlesque The United States Mail which premiered at Ford's Grand Opera House in Baltimore in February 1891 with a cast that included Walter Jones.

He died aged 79 in 1929 after a brief illness, leaving a widow and two sons, Charles J. and Frank H. Jenks.

In 1878 he was married to Sarah Jane Lambert, who died in 1895. His second wife was Elizabeth J. Aylward, to whom he was married in 1897. She died three months later August 11, in Clinton, N. J, and in 1899 he married Katherine Baird, who survived him.

== Works ==
- Official History of the Johnstwon Flood (1889), with Frank Connelly
