= Frank V. Webster =

House pseudonym used by the Stratemeyer Syndicate

Frank V. Webster was a pseudonym used by the Stratemeyer Syndicate. A total of 25 novels in The Webster Series For Boys were published by Cupples & Leon between 1909 and 1915. Titles were reprinted in 1938 by Saalfield Publishing.

== Frank V. Webster name ==
Effort was made to present Webster as if he was a real person. A 1911 advertisement stated: "We have made a distinct find in Mr. Frank V. Webster, who is under contract to write exclusively for us." Part of a 1921 newspaper advertisement read: "Mr. Webster’s style is much like that of the late lamented Horatio Alger, Jr., but his tales are all up-to-date. These are clean, clever boys’ stories."

== Actual authors ==
Many of the novels were written by Howard R. Garis. Other authors were George Rathbone, J. W. Lincoln and Weldon J. Cobb.

== Bibliography ==
- 1. Only a Farm Boy (1909)
- 2. Tom the Telephone Boy (1909)
- 3. The Boy from the Ranch (1909)
- 4. The Young Treasure Hunter (1909)
- 5. Bob the Castaway (1909)
- 6. The Young Firemen of Lakeville (1909)
- 7. The Newsboy Partners (1909)
- 8. The Boy Pilot of the Lakes (1909)
- 9. Two Boy Gold Miners (1909)
- 10. Jack the Runaway (1909)
- 11. Comrades of the Saddle (1910)
- 12. The Boys of Bellwood School (1910)
- 13. Bob Chester’s Grit (1911)
- 14. Airship Andy (1911)
- 15. The High School Rivals (1911)
- 16. Darry the Life Saver (1911)
- 17. Dick the Bank Boy (1911)
- 18. Ben Hardy’s Flying Machine (1911)
- 19. The Boys of the Wireless (1912)
- 20. Harry Watson’s High School Days (1912)
- 21. The Boy Scouts of Lennox (1915)
- 22. Tom Taylor at West Point (1915)
- 23. Cowboy Dave (1915)
- 24. Two Boys of the Battleship (1915)
- 25. Jack of the Pony Express (1915)
