= Weldon J. Cobb =

Weldon J. Cobb (c. 1849 – July 1, 1922) was a Chicago writer, reporter and newspaper editor. From 1877 through 1880 he sold fifteen stories to Nickel Library, and from 1891 through 1895 Cobb regularly contributed stories to Golden Hours.

Using the pseudonym of Frank V. Webster Cobb wrote books in The Webster Series of boy's novels prepared by the Stratemeyer Syndicate Those books were published between 1909 and 1915. In May 1912 Edward Stratemeyer asked Cobb to write a series of juvenile aviation adventure novels.

== Dave Dashaway series ==
Using the pen name of Roy Rockwood Cobb wrote the following Dave Dashaway novels for the Stratemeyer Syndicate. All were published by Cupples & Leon.

- Dave Dashaway, the Young Aviator: or, In the Clouds For Fame and Fortune (1913)
- Dave Dashaway, and His Hydroplane; or, Daring Adventures Over the Great Lakes (1913)
- Dave Dashaway, and His Giant Airship; or, A Marvellious Trip Across the Atlantic (1913)
- Dave Dashaway, Around the World; or, A Young Yankee Aviator Among Many Nations (1913)
- Dave Dashaway, Air Champion; or, Wizard Work In the Clouds (1915)

== Stories in periodicals ==
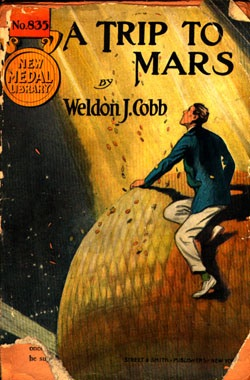
Edition of To Mars with Tesla; or, The Mystery of Hidden Worlds with the title A Trip to Mars; or, The Spur of Adventure (Street & Smith, 1928)

Marrying a Title; or, Love That Triumphed, Chicago Ledger, December 31, 1911 – February 10, 1912.

The Boy Detective; or, The Great Morgan Mystery, Chicago Ledger, April 13, 1912–?

A Boy Acrobat; or, A Young Circus King, Chicago Ledger, October 25, 1912–?

Bob Bright's Adventures; or, Hunting the Golden Butterfly, Chicago Ledger, March 1914 -?

To Mars with Tesla; or, The Mystery of the Hidden World, Golden Hours, March 30 – May 18, 1901.

Frank Warren, Alchemist; or, The Diamond Makers, Brave and Bold No. 27, June 27, 1903.

The Electric Eye; or, Helped by the X Rays, Brave and Bold No. 40, September 26, 1903.

Which is Which? or, Winning a Name by Proxy, Brave and Bold No.47, November 14, 1903.

Wide Awake; or, Boys of the Bicycle Brigade, Brave and Bold No. 220, March 9, 1907.

A Wonder Worker; or, The Search for the Splendid City, Brave and Bold No. 234, June 15, 1907.

Jocko, The Talking Monkey; or, The Fortunes of Roy Alden, Globe-Trotter, Brave and Bold No. 237, July 6, 1907

The Sky Pilots; or, Chasing a Shadow, Brave and Bold No. 247, September 14, 1907.

At War with Mars; or, The Boys Who Won, Brave and Bold No. 256, November 16, 1907.

Lucky-Stone Dick; or, The Eighth Wonder of the World, Brave and Bold No. 259, December 7, 1907.

The Golden Harpoon; or, The Cruise of the Clifton Cadets, Brave and Bold No. 263, January 4, 1908.

Partners Three; or, A Cartload of Corn, Brave and Bold No. 268, February 9, 1908.

The Phantom Boy; or, The Young Railroaders of Tower Ten, Brave and Bold No. 279, April 25, 1903.

The Golden Pirate; or, The Second Samson, Brave and Bold No. 291, July 13, 1908.

On the Wing; or, The Chase for the Golden Butterfly, Brave and Bold No. 297, August 29, 1908.

Slam, Bang & Co.; or, The Young Aladdins of Fortune, Brave and Bold No. 301, September 26, 1908.

Held for Ransom, or; The Young Ranch Owner, Brave and Bold No. 304, October 17, 1908.

Runaway and Rover; or, The Boy from Nowhere, Brave and Bold No. 315, January 2, 1909.

The Tattooed Boy; or, Bound to Make His Mark, Brave and Bold No. 320, February 6, 1909.

The Miracles of Steel; or, The Boy Wonder, Brave and Bold No. 325, March 13, 1909.

A Miracle a Minute; or, A Brace of Meteors, Brave and Bold No. 329, April 10, 1909.

A Battle with Fate; or, The Baseball Mascot, Brave and Bold No. 334, May 15, 1909.

The Fourteenth Boy; or, How Vin Lovell Won Out, Brave and Bold No. 339, June 10, 1909.

Smart Alice; or, Bound to Get There, Brave and Bold No. 344, July 24, 1909.

Checked Through to Mars; or, Adventures in Other Worlds, Brave and Bold No. 348, August 21, 1909.

The Tiger's Claws; or, Out With the Mad Mullah, Brave and Bold No. 361, November 20, 1909.
