= William D. Boyce =

BSA founder and businessman (1858–1929)

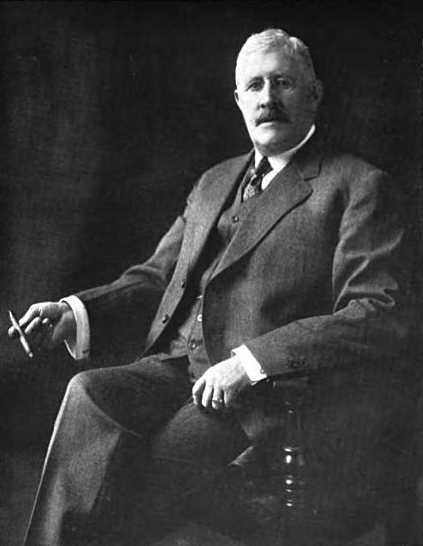
- Born: William Dickson Boyce; June 16, 1858; Plum, Pennsylvania, U.S.
- Died: June 11, 1929 (aged 70); Chicago, Illinois, U.S.
- Resting place: Ottawa Avenue Cemetery, Ottawa, Illinois
- Occupation: Businessman
- Known for: Adventurer; scouting founder
- Spouses: Mary Jane Beacom (m. 1884; div. 1908) (m. 1913) Virginia Dorcas Lee (m. 1910; div. 1912)
- Awards: Silver Buffalo Award

William Dickson Boyce (June 16, 1858 – June 11, 1929) was an American newspaper man, entrepreneur, magazine publisher, and explorer. He was the founder of the Boy Scouts of America (BSA) and the short-lived Lone Scouts of America (LSA). Born in Allegheny County, Pennsylvania, he acquired a love for the outdoors early in his life. After working as a schoolteacher and a coal miner, Boyce attended Wooster Academy in Ohio before moving to the Midwest and Canada. An astute businessman, Boyce successfully established several newspapers, such as The Commercial in Winnipeg, Manitoba, and the Lisbon Clipper in Lisbon, North Dakota. With his first wife, Mary Jane Beacom, he moved to Chicago to pursue his entrepreneurial ambitions. There he established the Mutual Newspaper Publishing Company and the weekly Saturday Blade, which catered to a rural audience and was distributed by thousands of newspaper boys. With his novel employment of newsboys to boost newspaper sales, Boyce's namesake publishing company maintained a circulation of 500,000 copies per week by 1894. Boyce strongly supported worker rights, as demonstrated by his businesses' support of labor unions and his concern for his newsboys' well-being.

By the early years of the 20th century, Boyce had become a multi-millionaire and had taken a step back from his businesses to pursue his interests in civic affairs, devoting more time to traveling and participating in expeditions. In 1909, he embarked on a two-month trip to Europe and a large photographic expedition to Africa with photographer George R. Lawrence and cartoonist John T. McCutcheon. Over the next two decades, Boyce led expeditions to South America, Europe, and North Africa, where he visited the newly discovered tomb of King Tutankhamun.

Boyce learned about Scouting while passing through London during his first expedition to Africa in 1909. According to somewhat fictionalized legend, Boyce had become lost in the dense London fog, but was guided back to his destination by a young boy, who told him that he was merely doing his duty as a Boy Scout. Boyce then read printed material on Scouting, and on his return to the United States, he formed the B.S.A.

From its start, Boyce focused the Scouting program on teaching self-reliance, citizenship, resourcefulness, patriotism, obedience, cheerfulness, courage, and courtesy in order "to make men". After clashing over the Scouting program with the first Chief Scout Executive James E. West, he left the B.S.A. and founded the L.S.A. in January 1915, which catered to rural boys who had limited opportunities to form a troop or a patrol.

In June 1924, five years before Boyce's death, a merger was completed between the B.S.A. and the struggling L.S.A. Boyce received many awards and memorials for his efforts in the U.S. Scouting movement, including the famed "Silver Buffalo Award".

== Personal life and family ==
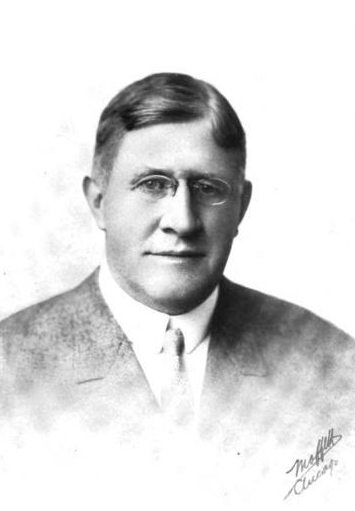
William D. Boyce, founder of American Scouting, c. 1912

Boyce was born on June 16, 1858, in New Texas, Pennsylvania – now Plum Borough —to a Presbyterian farm couple, David and Margaret Jane Bratton Boyce. The Boyces had three children: William Dickson, Mary, and John. During his rural childhood, Boyce acquired a love for the outdoors. He began teaching school at the age of 16 and then worked briefly as a coal miner. He returned to teaching before joining his sister at Wooster Academy in Ohio, which—according to school records—he attended from 1880 to 1881. It is uncertain if he graduated or was expelled.

He then worked as a teacher, lumberjack, secretary, and salesman in the Midwest and Canada before settling in Chicago, where he quickly became known as a persuasive and shrewd salesman and learned business quickly. His books on business, travel, and expeditions often used the phrase "We pushed on." On January 1, 1884, Boyce married Mary Jane Beacom (1865–1959), whom he had known since his Pennsylvania childhood. Boyce called her Betsy, but to many her nickname was "Rattlesnake Jane" because she matched his skill in poker, was an expert shot, and rode horses cross saddle. It had also become obvious that she was more masculine than Boyce himself, although he had never admitted this, it became clear out of his journal. They had one son and two daughters: Benjamin Stevens (1884–1928), Happy (1886–1976) and Sydney (1889–1950).

Boyce's personal activities included hunting, yachting, Odd Fellows, Freemasonry, Shriners, golf, country clubs and the Chicago Hussars—an independent equestrian military organization.

In 1903, Boyce purchased a four-story mansion on 38 acres (15 ha) in Ottawa, Illinois, which became the center of his family and social activities. Thereafter, he showed little interest in Chicago and its social activities; he would only go there on business. Boyce and Mary led increasingly separate lives and eventually divorced, which was reported on the front page of the Chicago Tribune because of the prominence he had attained by that time. The divorce was finalized in a Campbell County, South Dakota court in September 1908; his wife's property settlement was close to $1 million (USD).

After the divorce was finalized, Boyce courted Virginia Dorcas Lee, a vocalist from Oak Park, Illinois, who was 23 years his junior and the eldest child of Virginia and John Adams Lee, a former Lieutenant Governor of Missouri. Both Virginia's parents and Boyce's son Ben opposed the relationship. In May 1910, after the planned marriage was announced, an infuriated Ben scuffled with his father outside the Blackstone Hotel and Boyce sustained a facial wound. Ben was arrested for disorderly conduct and fined $5 and court costs. Two days later, Boyce and Virginia married and went to Europe on an extended honeymoon. Almost immediately, there was speculation amongst family members and in newspapers about problems within the marriage. On April 9, 1911, Boyce and Virginia had a daughter, whom they named Virginia. A few months later, in December 1911, Boyce signed an agreement to support and educate their infant daughter. After Boyce's wife filed for divorce in March 1912, she moved to Santa Barbara, California, with their daughter and her parents. Boyce did not contest the divorce and arranged for a $100,000 settlement. Years later, the elder Virginia married Richard Roberts, a New York banker, and moved with her and Boyce's daughter to Greenwich, Connecticut. The younger Virginia took the surname Roberts. She did not meet her natural father, Boyce, until she was eight years old.

Ben married Miriam Patterson of Omaha, Nebraska, on June 11, 1912. Both Boyce and his first wife attended the ceremony. At this time Boyce's first wife, Mary, exchanged some of her Chicago property for the home in Ottawa, which sparked speculation that she and Boyce might reconcile. The next year they remarried on June 14, 1913, in Ottawa. They then departed on a honeymoon to Alaska, Hawaii, the Philippines, Panama, and Cuba, with their daughter Happy, son Ben, and his wife Miriam.

== Business enterprises ==
As Boyce traveled, he often started a newspaper wherever he went. His first venture into commercial publishing was compiling a city directory. He also worked briefly for a publisher in Columbus, Ohio, and a newspaper publisher in Kensington, Pennsylvania, part of Philadelphia. He then boarded a train for Chicago and worked as a secretary and salesman for Western magazine. Restless again, he moved to Saint Paul, Minnesota, and sold advertisements for a publisher for a short time and then spent a month in Fargo, North Dakota, and Grand Forks, North Dakota. Further north in Canada, in Winnipeg, Manitoba, he and local resident James W. Steen co-founded The Commercial in 1881, a newspaper that lasted for 70 years. He sold his share of "The Commercial" to his partner in 1882 and returned to Fargo where he became a reporter. In December 1882, Boyce moved to Lisbon, North Dakota, where he bought the Dakota Clipper.

Beginning in December 1884, Boyce managed reporters and news releases at the "Bureau of Correspondence" at the six-month-long World's Industrial and Cotton Centennial Exposition in New Orleans, Louisiana. Countries from all over the world sent displays. Boyce was responsible for providing news stories on events and displays to over 1,200 newspapers around the country. He returned to North Dakota after the Exposition concluded, but by early 1886 he had moved back to Chicago. He often returned in North Dakota for publishing business deals and deer- and duck-hunting vacations.

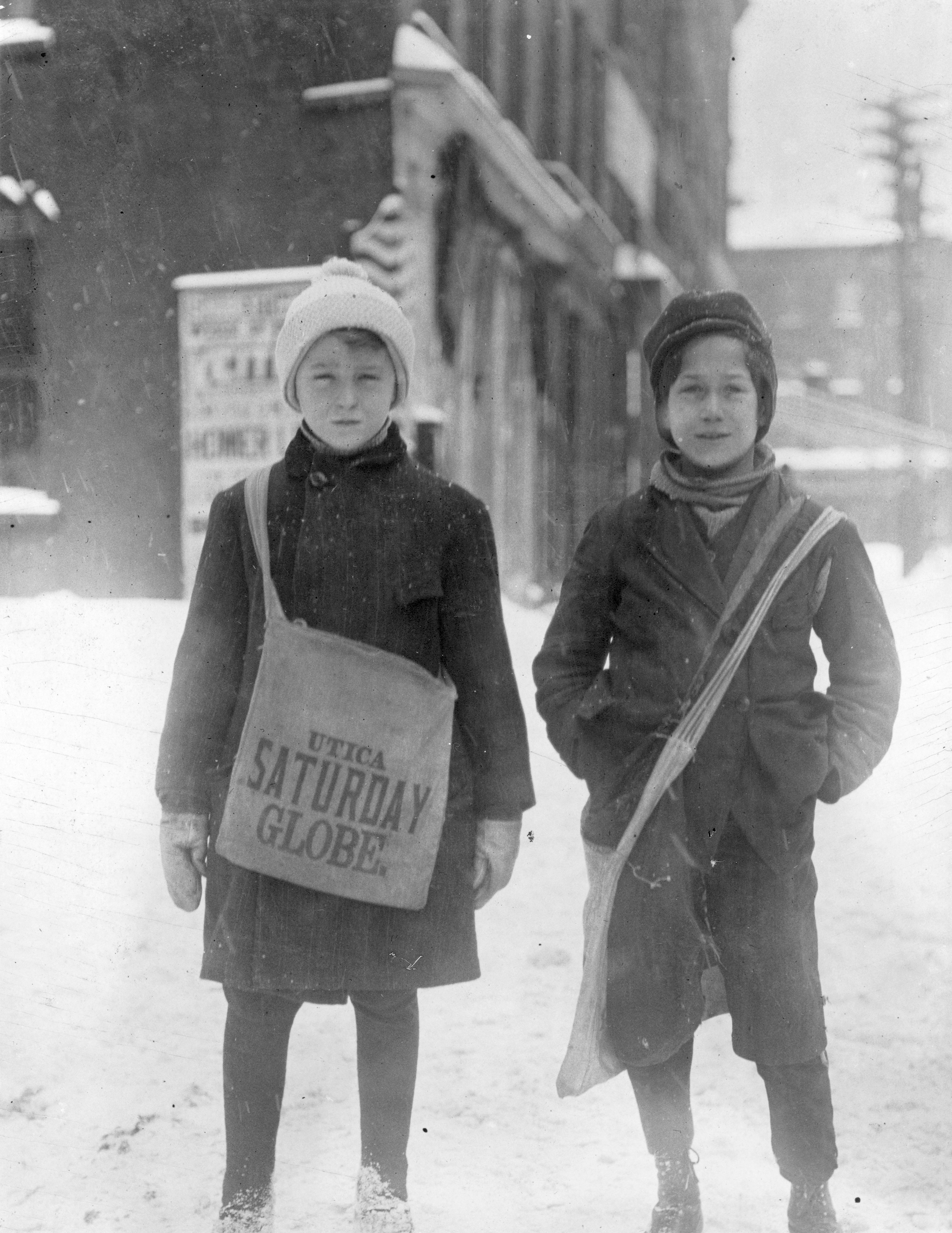
Newschildren, February 1910

In Chicago, he founded the Mutual Newspaper Publishing Company in 1886 which provided advertisements and articles to over 200 newspapers. In 1887, he established the weekly Saturday Blade, an illustrated newspaper aimed at rural audiences and sold by thousands of newsboys—an innovation at the time. By 1892, the Saturday Blade had the largest circulation of any weekly newspaper in the United States. Boyce's detailed reports of his foreign travels provided articles for the "Saturday Blade" and were reprinted in books by atlas/map publisher Rand McNally. The success of the Saturday Blade spawned the W. D. Boyce Publishing Company, which Boyce used to buy or start several newspapers and magazines. In 1892, Boyce bought out the "Chicago Ledger", a fiction weekly publication. In January 1903 he founded the international Boyce's Weekly, which advocated worker's rights. Boyce's prominence as a supporter of labor attracted labor/union leaders such as John Mitchell of the United Mine Workers and Henry Demarest Lloyd as writers and editors for Boyce's Weekly. Eight months later, Boyce's Weekly was consolidated with the Saturday Blade. Boyce also established the selected subject/topical newspapers Farm Business in 1914 and Home Folks Magazine in 1922. Dwindling sales led to the 1925 merger of the Blade and Ledger into the monthly Chicago Blade & Ledger, which was published until 1937. As Boyce's enterprises grew, he insisted on looking after the welfare of about 30,000 delivery boys, who were key to his financial success. Working with them may have helped him gain an understanding of America's youth. Boyce felt that delivering and selling newspapers taught a youth important responsibilities such as being polite, reading human nature, and handling money. Boyce's focused determination was evident in the advice he gave to young men: "There are many obstacles to overcome, but toil, grit and endurance will help you to overcome them all. Help yourself and others will help you." and "whatever trade you have selected; never swerve from that purpose a single moment until it is accomplished".

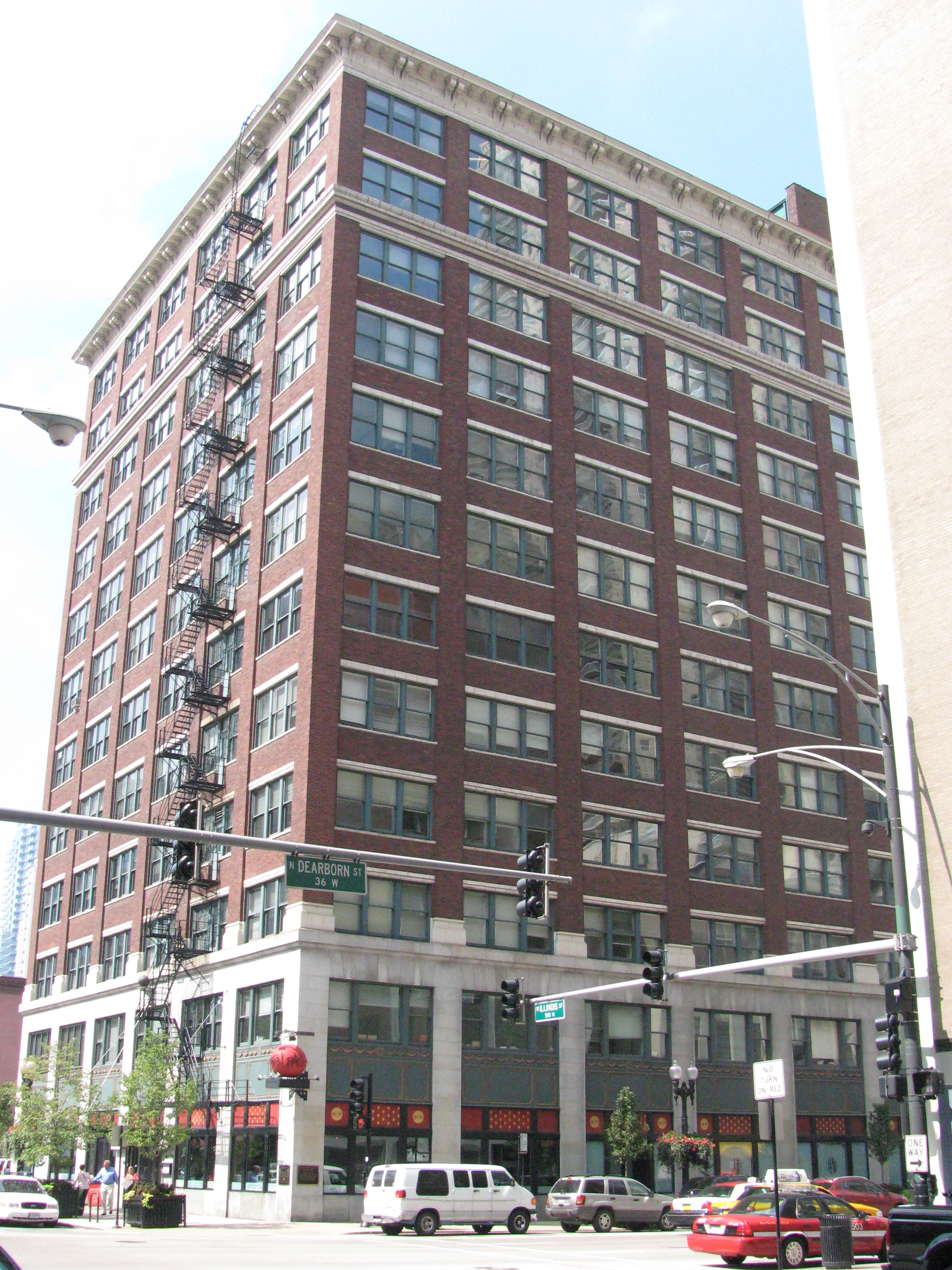
"The Boyce Building" at 500–510 North Dearborn Street, Chicago

In 1891, Boyce began working on his own 12-story office building at 30 North Dearborn Street, known as the "Boyce Building", it was designed by architect Henry Ives Cobb. Even 20 years later, this building was recognized as the most expensive building (in terms of dollars per cubic foot) in Chicago. In 1907, Boyce consolidated his business operations into another office building, also known as the Boyce Building, at 500–510 North Dearborn Street. A new four-story office building—designed by the architectural firm of Daniel Burnham—was built on this location in 1912 and expanded during 1913–14 with an additional six stories. This building was later listed on the National Register of Historic Places on February 29, 1996, maintained by the United States Department of the Interior and its National Park Service.

At a time when women had trouble finding work and workers were often oppressed, Boyce felt their rights were important: his businesses employed many women and he supported labor unions. His newspapers often carried stories about the "nobility of labor". His businesses were able to pay out wages and benefits during the Panic of 1893, a time when many businesses were laying off workers and cutting wages. During the Pullman Strike of the Pullman Palace Car Company in 1894, which spread to 20 companies in over half the states, Boyce called Eugene V. Debs, the socialist labor national leader of the American Railway Union, a "great labor leader" and industrialist George Pullman, inventor of the railroad passenger and sleeping car, the man "who caused all the trouble" (the then-current labor and social/political strife of the 1890s). In 1901 when the Boyce Paper Manufacturing Company in Marseilles, Illinois, burned down, he paid the workers immediately and then hired them back as construction workers to rebuild the paper mill so they would not lose income. Yet, he was also protective of his money. In late 1894, when two of his workers were injured by a fallen smokestack and won $2,000 each in a court judgment, Boyce appealed the case all the way to the Supreme Court of Illinois, and lost. He was also persistent in getting what he wanted; in 1902, he sued the Marseilles Land and Power Company for not supplying enough water power to his mills and won a $65,300 judgment. By 1903, the Marseilles Land and Power Company fell into receivership and Boyce bought up the company.

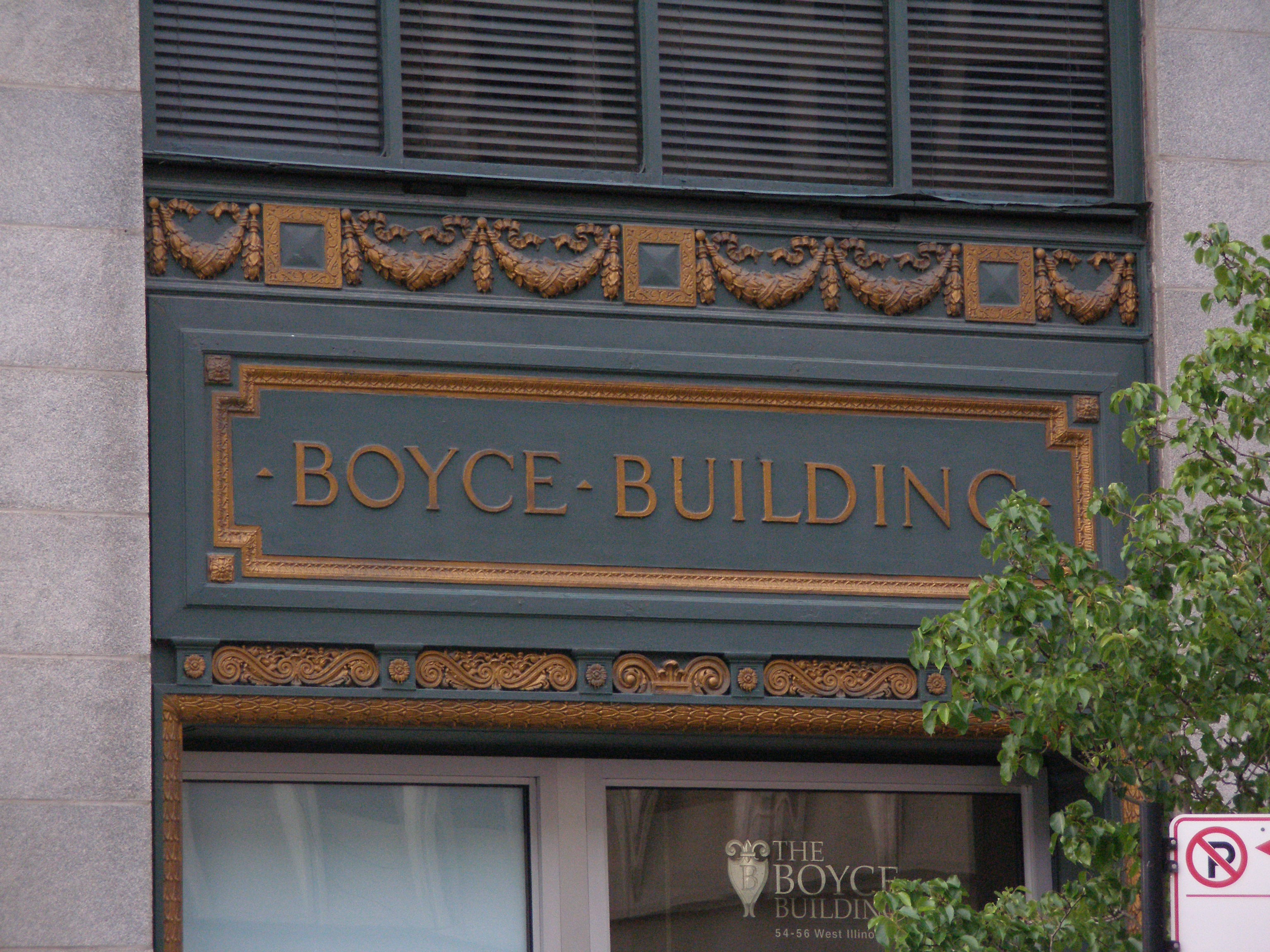
Entrance to the "Boyce Building" at 500–510 North Dearborn Street, Chicago

Boyce hired his son, Ben, when he was 20 years old, giving him high-level positions in his water and power businesses in and around Marseilles and Ottawa. However, their relationship was often strained by Boyce's high expectations and Ben's carelessness with his funds in activities such as betting on horse races.

During June–August 1906, the government proposed quadrupling the postage rate for second-class mail, which included newspapers, from one cent to four cents per pound. In response, Boyce proposed buying the Post Office Department for $300 million (USD), claiming that he would reduce postal rates by half, eliminate chronic deficits by applying business methods to postal operations, establish a rural postal express, pay rent to the United States Department of the Treasury for postal buildings, and return profits over seven percent. This offer was rejected by the government, but it did halt their planned second-class postage rate increase.

Boyce was a multi-millionaire by the early 1900s and by 1909 became more interested in civic affairs and less in finance. He also began to travel, often as part of hunting expeditions. He leased hunting lodges at Fort Sisseton, South Dakota, where he had hunted as a young man. He often hosted friends and relatives, especially his son, for activities such as hunting, fishing, dinner, poker, and plentiful liquor. These changes may have been in part caused by the destruction of his Ottawa mansion by fire in early 1908, which was soon rebuilt, followed three months later by the sale of his Marseilles paper mill due to a new law that prevented railroads from negotiating with shippers, and his September 1908 announcement that he and his wife, Mary Jane, were separating.

In 1914 Boyce bought two more newspapers, the "Indianapolis Sun", which he renamed the "Indianapolis Daily Times", and the "Inter Ocean Farmer", which he renamed "The Farming Business". By 1920, the majority of Americans lived in cities instead of rural areas. Lone Scout, "Saturday Blade", and "Chicago Ledger" all focused on rural customers and began to falter. Boyce launched "Home Folks Magazine" in an attempt to regain customers. By June 1925, sales had slipped so much that he merged the latter two titles into the "Blade and Ledger", which caused sales to rise again. This encouraged Boyce to start "Movie Romances", one of the first tabloid magazines about movie star romances.

Boyce's success in the publishing business lay in his ability to organize the administration of a business and delegate details to subordinates. He eventually amassed a fortune of about US$20 million. Boyce's life paralleled Theodore Roosevelt's in many ways: Both men were products of the Progressive Era, internationally prominent, had concern for children, supported Scouting, were adventurers and outdoorsmen, (modern-day "environmentalists"), and were interested in civic reform. Although Boyce admired and sought to surpass Roosevelt, his only foray into politics was the 1896 Republican primary for a United States representative (congressman) in the U.S. House of Representatives – a bitterly fought campaign which he lost to first-term incumbent George E. Foss. In all likelihood, Boyce met Roosevelt at the Union League Club of Chicago, of which the former had become a member in 1891. His ambivalent attitude towards government was a common one of the general public during the Progressive Era. However, Boyce's Republican credentials and monetary contributions earned him an invitation to the presidential inauguration and ball of newly elected successor to "T.R.", the 27th President, William Howard Taft in March 1909.

== Expeditions ==
Boyce financed an expedition of the explorer Frederick Schwatka to Alaska in 1896. Schwatka discovered gold near Nome and Boyce reported this success in his newspapers, which led him to finance other Schwatka expeditions as well as those of other adventurers, including a failed expedition to the Yukon River in 1898. Boyce soon began to carry out his own expeditions. When the United States entered the Spanish–American War in 1898, Boyce set sail for Cuban waters aboard the ship Three Friends. The nature of the activities of Boyce and this ship are unknown.

In March 1909, Boyce embarked on a two-month trip to Europe, which included a visit to his daughters, who were in Rome. On returning to America, Boyce organized a photographic expedition to Africa with the innovative aerial photographer George R. Lawrence. Boyce met with safari organizers and outfitters and provisioned his expedition in London and Naples. His son Benjamin and Lawrence's son Raymond were part of the expedition. Cartoonist John T. McCutcheon joined the expedition while they were sailing from Naples to Africa. The group disembarked at Mombasa, Kenya, and was in Nairobi by September. After hiring local porters and guides, the entire expedition totaled about 400 people, about three-fourths of whom were servants. It required 15 train cars to move the people and equipment to the area the expedition was going to explore near Kijabi and Lake Victoria. The expedition was a failure because a telephoto lens was neither brought nor subsequently procured, the hot air balloons were not suitable for the conditions on the plains of East Africa, and the cameras were so large and noisy to move into position that the animals were scared away. The members of the expedition had to resort to buying photographs of big game animals from shops in cities such as Nairobi. The expedition did manage to successfully hunt several species of big game animals.

In December 1910, Boyce led a nine-month, 50,000-mile (80,000 km) expedition to South America that was extensively reported in his newspapers. In late January 1915, Boyce sailed to England because of his concern over World War I. He received permission from the American Legation in Switzerland to travel into Germany and Austria for six weeks to report on the industrial and commercial effects of the war on those countries. He sent extensive reports to his newspapers and returned home around April–May.

In late 1922, Boyce departed on another expedition to Africa, this time for six months. Morocco reminded him of the Dakotas, Kansas, Texas, Florida, and Arizona. In Egypt he visited the tomb of Tutankhamun, which had been discovered just a few months earlier. His expedition then went to Luxor and sailed up the Nile River to Edfu, where the houses had no roofs and while he was there it rained and hailed for the first time in decades. Boyce stated that between his two expeditions to Africa, he had shot at least one of every game animal.

== Scouting ==
As Boyce's interest in philanthropy grew, he turned to his childhood experiences in the outdoors as a resource, but could not find a way to channel his charitable ideas and dreams until a fateful stop to England while en route to what became the failed photographic expedition to Africa. Events in London on the way to and from this expedition would lead to the founding of the Boy Scouts of America (BSA), one of many civic and professional organizations formed during the Progressive Era to fill the void of citizens who had become distended from their rural roots. Many youth organizations such as the Woodcraft Indians and Sons of Daniel Boone formed in America in the early 1900s focusing on outdoor character-building activities. The writings and adventures of Theodore Roosevelt contributed to these movements, with their outdoor, nature, and pioneer themes. By the time of his 1922 expedition to Africa, Boyce was so well respected in Scouting that French Boy Scouts in Algeria saluted him and offered to escort him along a trail when they found out he was the founder of BSA and LSA in America.

=== Unknown Scout legend ===
According to legend, Boyce was lost on a foggy street in London in 1909 when an unknown Scout came to his aid, guiding him back to his destination. The boy then refused Boyce's tip, explaining that he was merely doing his duty as a Boy Scout. Boyce was so impressed by the boy's actions that it inspired him to bring Scouting to America. Soon thereafter, Boyce met with Robert Baden-Powell, who was the head of the Boy Scout Association at that time. Boyce returned to America, and, four months later, founded the Boy Scouts of America on February 8, 1910. He intended to base the program around American Indian lore. This version of the legend has been printed in numerous BSA handbooks and magazines. There are several variations of it, including ones that claim Boyce knew about Scouting before this encounter and that the Unknown Scout took him to Scout headquarters.

In actuality, Boyce stopped in London en route to a safari in British East Africa. It is true that an unknown Scout helped him and refused a tip. But this Scout only helped him cross a street; he did not take him to the Scout headquarters and Boyce never met Baden-Powell. Upon Boyce's request, the unknown Scout did give him the address of the Scout headquarters, where Boyce went and picked up a copy of Scouting For Boys and other printed material on Scouting. He read this while on safari and was so impressed that instead of making his return to America an around-the-world trip via San Francisco, he returned to the Scout headquarters in London. He volunteered to organize Scouting in America and was told that he could use their manual. While Boyce's original account does not mention fog, a 1928 account says there was fog. Climatologists report no fog on that day in London.

=== Boy Scouts of America ===
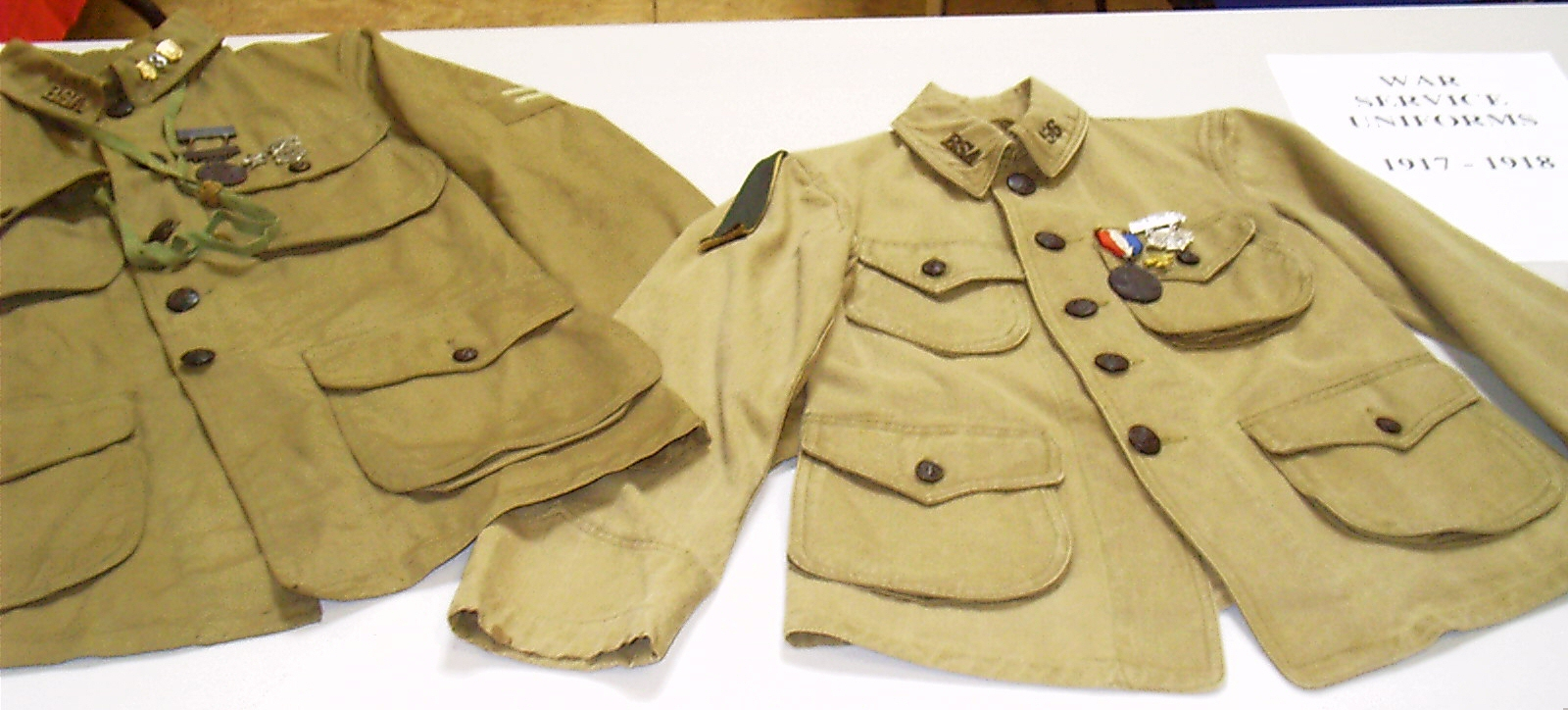
BSA uniforms, 1917–18

The Boy Scouts of America was incorporated on February 8, 1910, but it struggled from shortages of cash and leadership in the beginning. Boyce personally donated $1,000 a month to keep the organization running on the condition that boys of all races and creeds be included. He was not interested in directing the organization, and turned over the running of the organization to Edgar M. Robinson of the YMCA, who proceeded to recruit the permanent executive board of the BSA. The much-needed leadership and management arrived when the Sons of Daniel Boone and Woodcraft Indians merged with the BSA.

Boyce felt that Scouting's emphasis on outdoor activity was crucial in producing the type of leaders that America needed because youth reared in cities had too much done for them, whereas those from the country had to learn to do things for themselves. Scouting was focused on teaching self-reliance, citizenship, resourcefulness, patriotism, obedience, cheerfulness, courage, and courtesy in order "to make men".

=== Lone Scouts of America ===
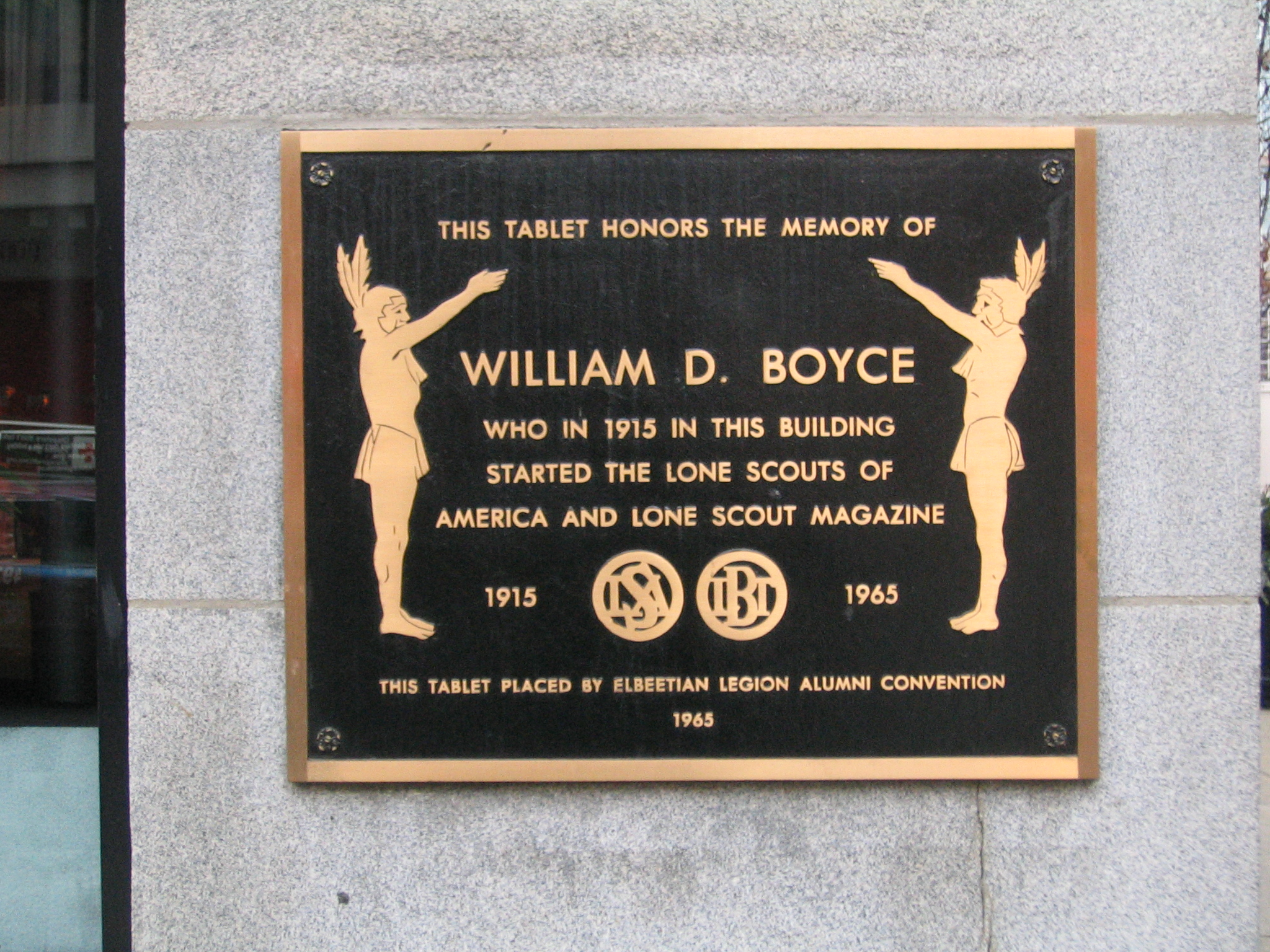
Plaque on the Boyce Building honoring Boyce and his founding of the Lone Scouts of America

Boyce clashed with James E. West, the BSA's Chief Scout Executive, over a program for boys who lived too far from town to join a troop. Boyce offered to publish a magazine for the BSA, as long as it was published in Chicago. The National Executive Board of the BSA turned this offer down and shortly thereafter Boyce ceased being active in administrative activities of the BSA, though he remained a staunch supporter of the program. As a result of this and his desire to serve boys who had limited opportunities as he himself did when he was young, Boyce started a new Scouting-related venture: the Lone Scouts of America (LSA) on January 9, 1915. Reliance on Native American themes gave LSA a distinct Native American flavor: Lone Scouts could form small groups known as "tribes", the tribe's treasurer was known as the "wampum-bearer", and LSA taught boys to respect the environment. Boyce's annual contribution to the LSA grew to $100,000. In both the BSA and the LSA, Boyce was a manager and had little direct contact with the Boy Scouts. Upon his return from reporting on World War I, Boyce immediately began expanding the LSA by starting Lone Scout magazine and hiring Frank Allan Morgan, a noted Chicago Scoutmaster, to lead the LSA. By November 1915, the LSA had over 30,000 members. Warren conferred upon Boyce the title Chief Totem. Youths could join the LSA simply by mailing in some coupons and five cents. By 1916, the BSA and the LSA were in direct competition for members. In the summer of 1917, during his annual Dakota hunt, the Gros Ventres Indian tribe made Boyce an honorary chief with the name "Big Cloud" during a three-day ceremony. With America at war, Boyce agreed to the creation of a Lone Scout uniform in late 1917. Though he had a uniform made for himself, he stipulated that no Lone Scout was required to purchase one.

Boyce felt that Lone Scout was the best magazine he had ever done. Lone Scout was so popular that it could not handle all the material that was submitted, so many local and regional Tribe Papers were started. By 1922, Boyce's newspaper business was suffering and Lone Scout was losing money—it switched from a weekly to a monthly. Boyce's racial prejudice was revealed when the racial tensions in Chicago increased in the 1920s. The LSA issued a formal proclamation in late 1920 that it would only accept whites and in 1922 changed the masthead of Lone Scout from "A Real Boys' Magazine" to "The White Boys Magazine".

The fortunes of the LSA had begun to decline by 1920 when Boyce hired the first professional editor for Lone Scout, George N. Madison. Madison discovered that the LSA's membership roster was wildly inaccurate: it was full of duplications and inactive members. The reported 490,000 Lone Scouts in 1922 was a vastly inflated number. Boyce finally accepted West's annual offer to merge with the BSA in April 1924, with the merger formalized on June 16, 1924. Some Lone Scouts did not transfer to the BSA, but the BSA continued Lone Scouting as a separate division for another decade, gradually losing its unique programs. Present day Lone Scouts use the standard Cub Scouting and Boy Scouting programs and activities, but are not part of a pack or troop on a regular basis because of factors such as distance, weather, time, disability or other difficulties.

== Legacy ==
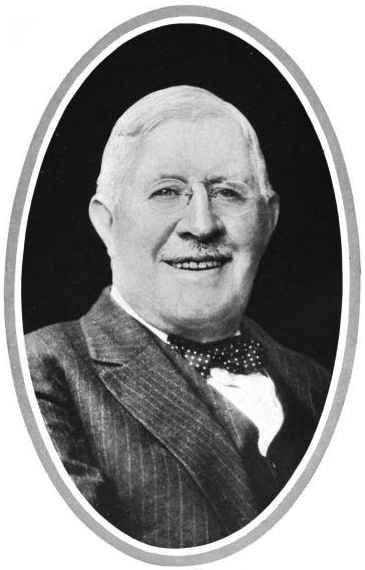
William D. Boyce, c. 1922

Benjamin Boyce died in 1928 of a heart embolism. His father did not arrive home until after his son's death. Boyce was so saddened over his son's death that his own health suffered. One of Boyce's last efforts was to publish his son's letters from his South Seas expeditions: Dear Dad Letters from New Guinea. Boyce died from bronchial pneumonia on June 11, 1929, in Chicago and was buried in his adopted hometown of Ottawa, Illinois, on June 13, 1929, in the Ottawa Avenue Cemetery, with West delivering the eulogy. Boy Scouts maintained an honor guard with an American flag in a heavy rainstorm in two-hour shifts at his Ottawa home and 32 Boy Scouts were chosen as honorary pallbearers. BSA officials sent his widow a telegram that said the entire American nation owed him a debt of gratitude. A statue that commemorates his contribution to the Boy Scouts of America was placed near his grave on June 21, 1941, which West dedicated.

Two plaques in Boyce's honor can be found at the southeast corner of the Boyce Building in Chicago's River North neighborhood. One honors the building as the site where the Boy Scouts of America was incorporated, and the other honors the Boyce's creation of the Lone Scouts of America and its Lone Scout Magazine in the building. The building itself is also listed on the National Register of Historic Places.

The Community College of Allegheny County, Boyce Campus, located in a suburb of Pittsburgh near his place of birth, is named in his honor. An historical marker commemorating Boyce can be found at the West Entrance of Community College of Allegheny County's Boyce Campus. Allegheny County also named an adjacent nearby county park after Boyce.

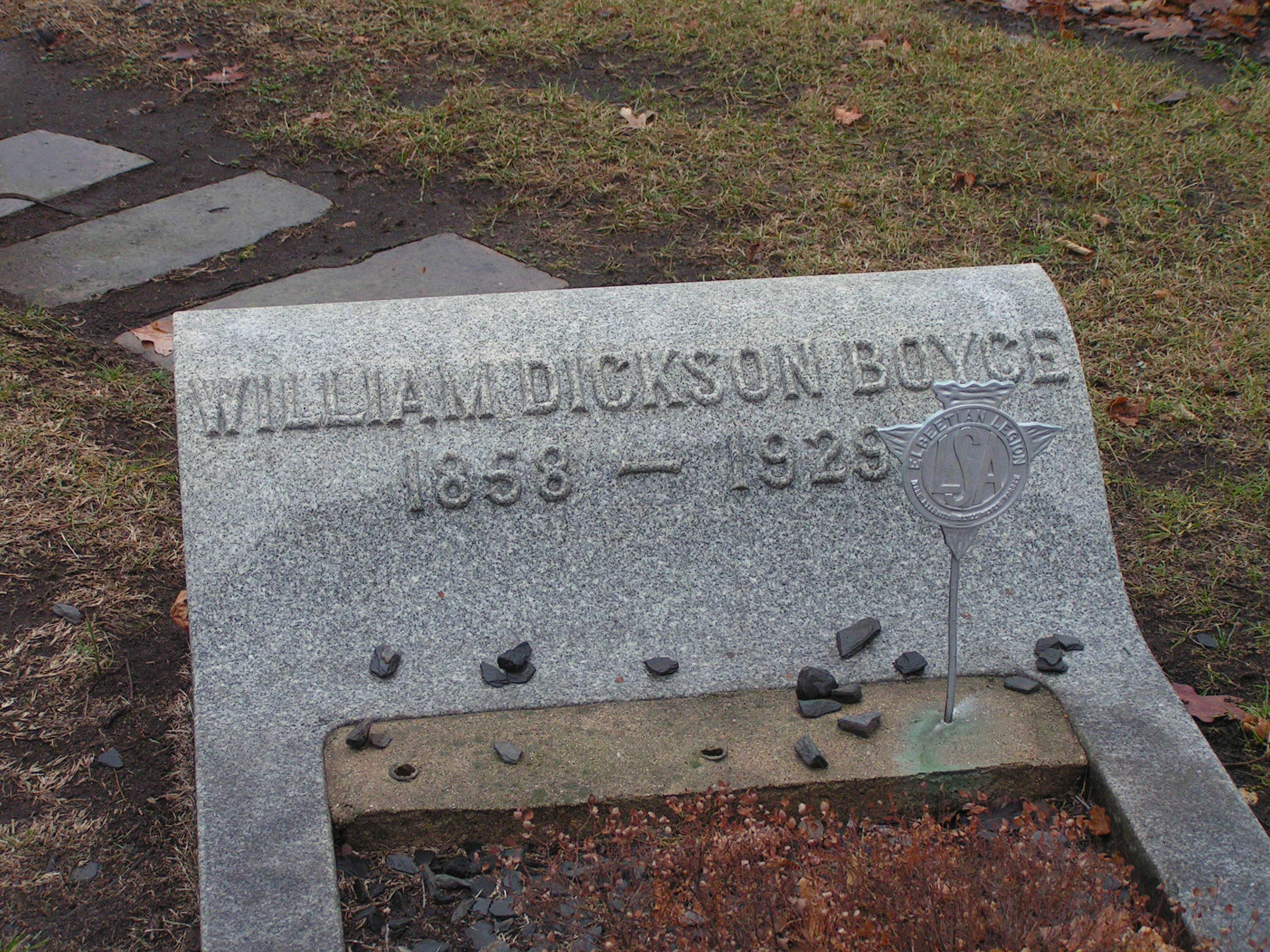
Grave of William D. Boyce

Boyce was recognized with the Silver Buffalo Award in 1926, the first year it was awarded, for his efforts in starting the BSA. He was the third recipient, after Baden-Powell and the Unknown Scout. During the BSA's 50th anniversary in 1960, 15,000 Scouts and several of Boyce's descendants gathered in Ottawa for a Boyce Memorial weekend. Illinois governor William Stratton delivered the key address and Bridge Street was renamed Boyce Memorial Drive. In 1985, about 2,500 Scouts attended a 75th anniversary pilgrimage in Ottawa, attended by his last surviving child, Virginia, and the Union League of Chicago named Boyce its first Hall of Fame member. Boyce had been a member from 1891 until he died. On December 6, 1997, a Scouting museum opened in Ottawa. The W. D. Boyce Council of the BSA is named in his honor. A Pennsylvania State Historical Marker located on Boyce Campus of Community College of Allegheny County in Monroeville, Pennsylvania, recognizes his achievements to Scouting. Not far from the marker is a county park, Boyce Park, that was named for him. A medallion of Boyce is near the White House as part of The Extra Mile – Points of Light Volunteer Pathway. In 2005, the BSA introduced the William D. Boyce New Unit Organization Award, presented to the organizer of any new Scouting unit.

The Extra Mile National Monument in Washington, DC selected Boyce as one of its 37 honorees. The Extra Mile pays homage to Americans like Boyce who set their own self-interest aside to help others and successfully brought positive social change to the United States.

== Works ==
- Boyce, William D. (1883). Lisbon and Her Industries. Lisbon, Dakota: Clipper Steam Printing and Publishing.
- Boyce, William D. (1894). A Strike. Chicago: Lakeside Press, R. R. Donnelley & Sons Co.
- Boyce, William D. (1912). Illustrated South America. Chicago: Rand McNally & Co.
- Boyce, William D. (1914). Illustrated United States Colonies and Dependencies. Chicago: Rand McNally & Co., also in four volumes:
  - Boyce, William D. (1914). Illustrated Alaska and the Panama Canal. Chicago: Rand McNally & Co.
  - Boyce, William D. (1914). Illustrated Hawaiian Islands and Porto Rico. Chicago: Rand McNally & Co.
  - Boyce, William D. (1914). Illustrated Philippine Islands. Chicago: Rand McNally & Co.
  - Boyce, William D. (1914). Illustrated United States Dependencies. Chicago: Rand McNally & Co.
- Boyce, William D. (1922). Illustrated Australia and New Zealand. Chicago: Rand McNally & Co.
- Boyce, William D. (1925). Illustrated Africa, North, Tropical, South. Chicago: Rand McNally & Co.

== See also ==
- Diana Oughton – Boyce's great-granddaughter
- World's Columbian Exposition

== General references ==
- Petterchak, Janice A. (2003). Lone Scout: W. D. Boyce and American Boy Scouting. Rochester, Illinois: Legacy Press. ISBN 0-9653198-7-3.
- Rowan, Edward L. (2005). To Do My Best: James E. West and the History of the Boy Scouts of America. Exeter, New Hampshire: Publishing Works. ISBN 1-933002-53-0.
