= St George Henry Rathborne =

American novelist

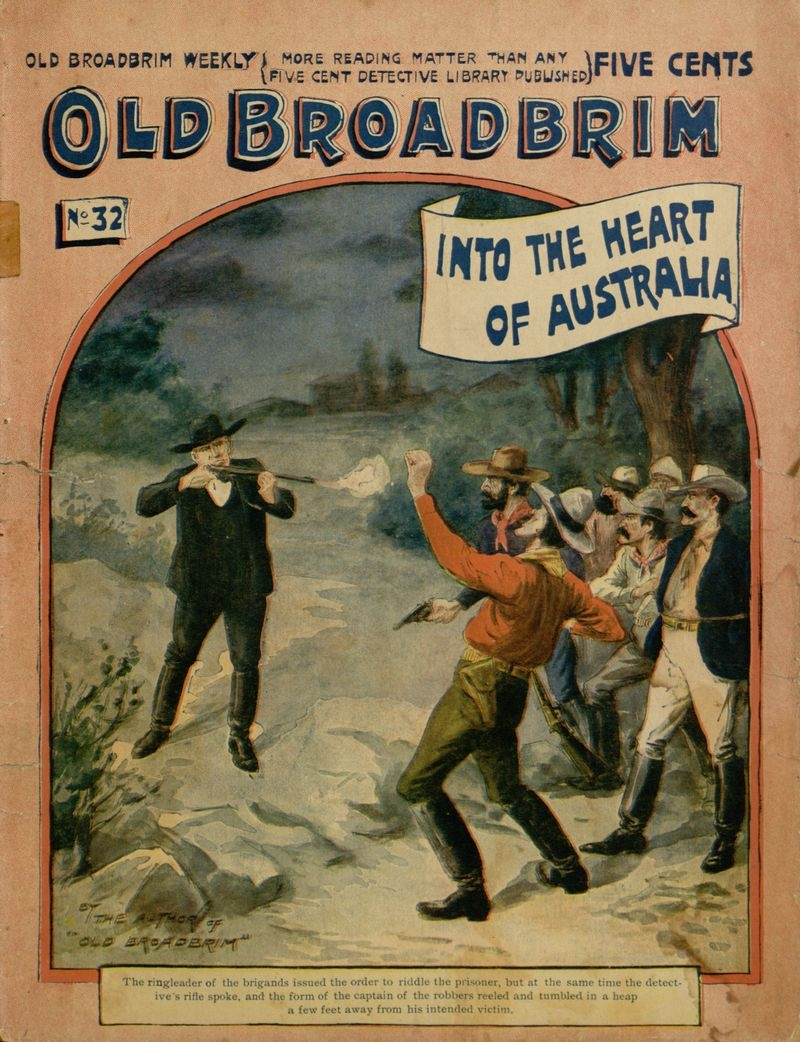
Old Broadbrim Into the Heart of Australia (1903)

St George Henry Rathborne (26 December 1854 - 16 December 1938), who also wrote as Harrison Adams and many other names, was an American author of boys' stories and dime novels. He is believed to have produced over 330 volumes of fiction in the course of a 60-year career. He had a proclivity for and skill in producing outdoor adventure stories, and his best works fall within that category.

== Life ==
Rathborne was born in Covington, Kentucky, to Gorges Lowther Rathborne and Margaret H. Robertson Rathborne. He attended Woodward High School, Cincinnati, the oldest public high school in the United States. He married Jessie Fremont Conn in 1879, and with her had four children. Rathborne lived in northern New Jersey for most of his adult life.

Rathborne was affiliated with various dime novel publishers over the course of four decades, but most strongly associated with Street & Smith, with whom he spent 20 years as author and editor. After 1910, he wrote almost exclusively in the juvenile series book genre. Frequently wrote under pseudonyms, and such works account for the bulk of his literary output. His pseudonyms are many and poorly documented, and some remain unidentified. He probably used at least 30 different pen names in his career as a dime novelist, and more than 20 others during his years of series book writing. Poor documentation of his pseudonyms makes the attribution of his works occasionally difficult, and the full extent of his published writings may never be known. There are more liberal estimates of his output, and it is possible that he produced as many as 450 novels.

Rathborne wrote under many names, including Harrison Adams, Hugh Allen, Oliver Lee Clifton, Duke Duncan, Aleck Forbes, Lieutenant Keene, Marline Manly, Mark Merrick, Marne Miller, Warne Miller, Harry St. George, W. B. Lawson, Dash Dale, Col. Lawrence Leslie, Jack Howard, Ward Edwards, Old Broadbrim, Jack Sharpe, Major Andy Burton, A Private Detective, Alex. Robertson, M.D., Herbert Carter, Gordon Stewart, John Prentice Langley, Louis Arundel and Col. J.M. Travers. to add to the confusion it was not unknown for authors to use the same pseudonym when writing for a particular publishing house.

Rathborne died in Newark, New Jersey aged 83.

== Bibliography ==
- Young Voyagers on the Nile by St. George Rathborne Akron: Saalfield Publishing, 1901.
- At The Blue Devil Mine (Log Cabin Library) as W. B. Lawson (1903)
- Adrift on a Junk by St. George Rathborne. Akron: Saalfield Publishing, 1905.
- Down the Amazon by St. George Rathborne. Akron: Saalfield Publishing, 1905.
- Young Castaways by St. George Rathborne. Akron: Saalfield Publishing, 1905.

Pioneer Boys series, as Harrison Adams

- Boy Scout stories, as Herbert Carter
- Boy Scouts in the World War stories as Gordon Stewart
- Miss Fairfax of Virginia a romance of love and adventure under the palmettos,
- Doctor Jack, a novel
- The fair maid of Fez
- Canoe mates in Canada; or, Three boys afloat on the Saskatchewan (as Archie McGregor) 1st printed in the Chicago Ledger (1909)
- The Young Fur Takers; or, Traps and Trails in the Wilderness (as St. George Rathborne) in the Chicago Ledger (1910)
- The House-Boat Boys; or, Floating Down to Dixie (as St. George Rathborne) in the Chicago Ledger (1911)

This was later bound as "The House Boat Boys; Or, Drifting Down to the Sunny South" (1912)

- Boy Scout Adventures; or, Lost in the Everglades (as St. George Rathborne) in the Chicago Ledger (1912)
- Jack Sewell's Fortunes (as St. George Rathborne) in the Chicago Ledger (1914)
- The Get There Club; or, Motor Boat Boys Afloat (as St. George Rathborne) in the Chicago Ledger (1915)
- Lone Scout Boys; or, For Preparedness (as St. George Rathborne) in the Chicago Ledger (1916)
- The Castaway Boys; or, Lost on a Raft (as St. George Rathborne) in the Chicago Ledger (1917)
- Roaring Ralph Rockwood, the reckless ranger
- Rattling Rube or, The night hawks of Kentucky
- Camp mates in Michigan: or, With pack and paddle in the pine woods
- Rocky Mountain Boys Or, Camping in the Big Game Country
- The boy cruisers, or, Paddling in Florida
- Daring Davy, the young bear killer: or, The trail of the border wolf
- A goddess of Africa: a story of the golden fleece
- A son of Mars
- Chums in Dixie, or, The strange cruise of a motorboat
- A chase for a bride a romance of the Philippines
- A sailor's sweetheart, or, Fighting for love and country
- The champion Texan rider
- The hunter Hercules or, The champion rider of the plains. A romance of the prairies
- Hickory Harry
- Thunderbolt Tom or, The wolf-herder of the Rockies
- Paddling under palmettos
- Custer's Scout
- The poker king, or, A cool million at stake, c. 1890, writing as Marline Manly
- Old Specie, the Treasury detective, or, The harbor lights of New York, c. 1890 writing as Alexander Robertson, M.D.
- Custer's last shot, or, The boy trailer of the Little Horn, writing as Col. J.M. Travers
- The House Boat Boys; Or, Drifting Down to the Sunny South (1912)
- Motor Boat Boys; Mississippi Cruise Or, The Dash for Dixie, writing as Louis Arundel (1912)
- Miss Caprice

=== As Herbert Carter ===
- The Boy Scouts at the Battle of Saratoga; or, The Story of General Burgoyne's Defeat (1909)
- The Boy Scouts' First Camp Fire; or, Scouting with the Silver Fox Patrol (1913)
- The Boy Scouts in the Rockies; or, The Secret of the Hidden Silver Mine (1913)
- The Boy Scouts on the Trail; or, Scouting through the Big Game Country (1913)
- The Boy Scouts in the Blue Ridge; or, Marooned Among the Moonshiners (1913)
- The Boy Scouts in the Maine Woods; or, The New Test for the Silver Fox Patrol (1913)
- The Boy Scouts Through the Big Timber; or, The Search for the Lost Tenderfoot (1913)
- The Boy Scouts Down in Dixie; or, The Strange Secret of Alligator Swamp (1914)
- The Boy Scouts Along the Susquehanna; or, The Silver Fox Patrol Caught in a Flood (1915)
- The Boy Scouts on War Trails in Belgium; or, Caught Between Hostile Armies (1916)
- The Boy Scouts Afoot in France; or, With the Red Cross Corps at the Marne (1917)
- The Boy Scouts on Sturgeon Island; or, Marooned Among the Game-fish Poachers

=== As Harry St George ===
- Starr's American Novels. No. 104
- Pocket Novels. No. 86
- Half-Dime Library. Nos. 30, 44, 59, 108, 166, 172, 1110
- Boy's Library (octavo). No. 154
- Pocket Library. Nos. 20, 25, 43, 101, 148, 192, 458
