= Chicago Ledger =

American story paper (1872–1924)

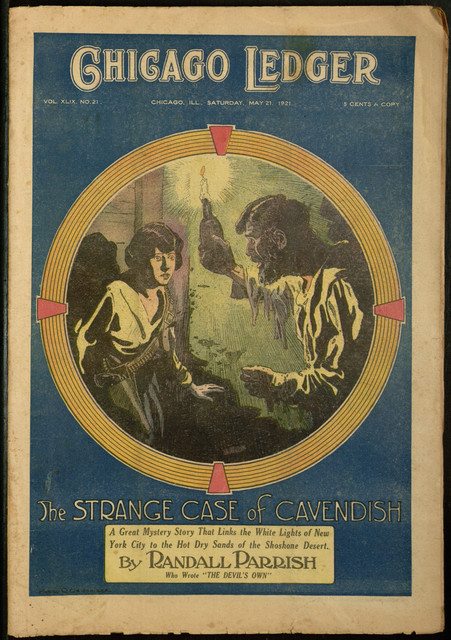
Chicago Ledger Vol. XLIX, no. 21; May 21, 1921

The Chicago Ledger was a story paper published in Chicago, Illinois, from 1872 until 1924. Put out by the Ledger Company and edited by Samuel H. Williams, the Ledger was a boilerplate literary magazine. Such periodicals were printed using engraved steel sheets. The plates, or casts of them, were then sent out to be printed and inserted into other newspapers. Ledger subscriptions originally sold for $1 for 52 issues and, by 1879, the paper had a circulation of 10,000. Although begun as a literary paper of "a good class," the Ledger eventually became more melodramatic in tone. In his 1910 book, Newspapers and Periodicals of Illinois, Franklin Scott, notes that "[t]he sensational, although not immoral, character of the Ledger stories, and the use that the large mail-order houses have made of its advertising columns, have given this paper an unusually long life and extensive circulation."

In 1892, William D. Boyce, who helped to found the Boy Scouts of America and later the Lone Scouts of America, purchased the Ledger and turned it into a "mail order" paper. As such, the Ledger relied on advertising by direct mail retailers to support its publication. This kind of publication made money without a large initial outlay. The Ledger contained serialized fiction and short stories designed to appeal to the whole family. Later issues had a supplement called the Little Ledger, which offered "Useful Knowledge, Romance, and Amusement for Young People."

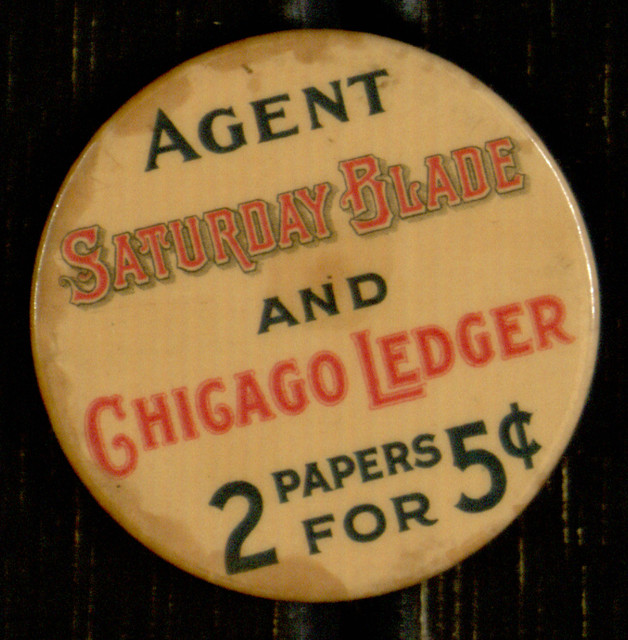
Agent Button for The Saturday Blade and The Chicago Ledger

The W.D. Boyce Company operated from the "second skyscraper in Chicago," at 30 North Dearborn Street until moving to the historic Boyce Building at 500-510 North Dearborn Street. Boyce sold the Chicago Ledger and The Saturday Blade, known together as Boyce's Big Weeklies, through a network of news boys. They earned two cents per paper sold and were not charged for unsold issues. This system worked well for the company as it provided them with a sales force in rural areas and functioned in accordance with Boyce's philosophy of providing rural boys with advantages more easily accessed in cities. Their recruiting material bore the slogan, "The best way to help a boy is to help him to help himself."

Contributors to the Chicago Ledger included Weldon J. Cobb, Harry Stephen Keeler, and Randall Parrish. Noted African-American author Charles W. Chesnutt wrote two short stories, "The Doctor’s Wife" and "A Metropolitan Experience," published in June, 1887. Edward Stratemeyer, whose Stratemeyer Syndicate was responsible for such series as The Hardy Boys, The Bobbsey Twins, and Nancy Drew, contributed to The Chicago Ledger under the name Edna Winfield.

In 1925, Boyce's Big Weeklies merged to become the Blade and Ledger. William D. Boyce died in 1929 in his penthouse apartment in the Boyce Building. The Blade & Ledger continued to be published monthly until 1937.
