= Lone Scouts of America =

American Scouting organization (1915–1924)

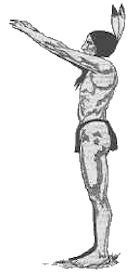
- Headquarters: Chicago, Illinois
- Country: United States
- Founded: January 9, 1915
- Defunct: June 16, 1924 (merged with the Boy Scouts of America)
- Founder: W. D. Boyce
- Chief Totem: W. D. Boyce

Lone Scouts of America (LSA) was a Scouting organization for American boys that operated from 1915 until it merged with the Boy Scouts of America (BSA) in 1924. The LSA was founded by W. D. Boyce, publisher of the Chicago Ledger and the Saturday Blade and one of the founders of the BSA. Boyce felt that the program of the BSA did not help the rural boy who could not find enough other boys to form a troop or a patrol. James E. West, the first Chief Scout Executive of the BSA, disagreed with Boyce's concept, believing that the 4-H program was fulfilling the role. After Boyce left the BSA, he started the Lone Scouts of America and incorporated it on January 9, 1915. Boyce became the executive officer or Chief Totem and Frank Allan Morgan became the editor of The Lone Scout. In October 1915, Boyce appointed all of his paperboys as members of the LSA and published the first issue of The Lone Scout magazine.

== Program ==
The LSA program was inspired by the Lone Scouts writings of John Hargrave in Britain and by Ernest Thompson Seton's Woodcraft Indians program that used American Indian themes. No adult leaders were required in the Lone Scout program, and there were no age limits. By November 1915, over 30,000 members were reported. Lone Scouts who lived near each other could form a "local tribe", while others could form a "mail tribe" and communicate by post. Tribes could join to form "wigwams". Tribes elected officers such as chief (president, initially called captain), sachem (vice-president), scribe (secretary) and wampum-bearer (treasurer). By October 1916, the LSA reported 133,000 members. By popular demand, a uniform was created in 1917 and the Lone Scout Supply Company was formed.

== Media ==
The main link of the Lone Scouts of America was the weekly newspaper The Lone Scout, published by Boyce's company, and sold by Lone Scouts. Boys were encouraged to write articles, stories and cartoons for Lone Scout, and several prizes and contests were announced. Many tribes started their own local "tribe papers"– this later became part of a program that became the Authorized Lone Scout Amateur Publications (ALSAPs). By December 1920, financial difficulties forced Boyce to publish the magazine on a monthly basis and increase the price. The Tribe Paper Editors' Protective Association was formed to help maintain the quality of the more prestigious of the tribe papers.

In 1924, a radio tribe was formed, sponsored by Sears, Roebuck and Co. Lone Scouts would read news stories on Sears' WLS radio station.

== Advancement and recognition ==
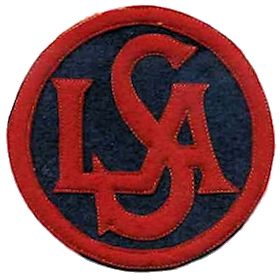
Badge of the LSA

An advancement program was developed that was split into lodges. The Teepee Lodge consisted of the First Degree (Lone Scout), Second Degree (Woodcraft) and the Third Degree (Lone Eagle). The Totem Pole Lodge included the Fourth Degree (Lone Bachelor), Fifth Degree (Lone Woodsman) and Sixth Degree (Lone Hunter). The Sagamore Lodge consisted of the Seventh Degree (Sagamore). The literary competitions were awarded with Lone Scout Contributor (LSC), Lone Scout Scribe (LSS), Lone Scout Graduate (LSG) and Lone Scout Quill (LSQ). The Booster Award system recognized Lone Scouts who recruited new members and was awarded in two levels: Lone Scout Organizer (LSO) and Lone Scout Booster (LSB). A Lone Scout who earned Sagamore Degree, Lone Scout Booster and Lone Scout Quill was recognized as a Supreme Scout (SS)– 123 were presented. War Work medals recognized those Lone Scouts who performed service work during World War I.

== Final years ==
The beginning of the end came in 1920, when Boyce hired the first professional editor for The Lone Scout magazine, George N. Madison. Madison discovered LSA's membership roster was wildly inaccurate and was full of duplications and inactive members. The magazine switched from a weekly to a monthly. By 1922, Boyce's newspaper business was suffering and The Lone Scout was losing money. Although membership was reported at 490,000 Lone Scouts in 1922, the editors of The Lone Scout realized that the numbers were wildly inflated.

As Chicago entered the 1920s nadir of American race relations, The Lone Scout announced that they would no longer accept applications "from members of the negro race" and in 1922, the mast head of The Lone Scout changed from "A Real Boys Magazine" to "The White Boys' Magazine."

== Boy Scouts of America ==
BSA Lone Scout logo

The Boy Scouts of America strongly defended their right to the usage of the term Scout, and West wrote to Boyce voicing his concerns, but the BSA never brought litigation against the LSA. In 1916, the BSA created the Pioneer Scout program in direct competition to the LSA, but it was never very successful.

In April 1924, Boyce finally accepted James West's persistent offer of a merger with the BSA. On June 16, 1924, the merger was formalized. When The Lone Scout ceased publication, many of the boys dropped out of Scouting entirely. About 65,000 Lone Scouts transferred to the BSA, and membership peaked at 108,000 in 1926. The BSA ran the program unchanged for about a decade as the Lone Scout Service and then the Lone Scout Division. The unique program features were then eliminated and the Lone Scouts transitioned to the standard Scouts BSA program. Lone Cub Scouts were added after the Cub Scouting program was introduced in 1930.

The last issue of The Lone Scout in April 1924 announced the merger with the BSA. The BSA continued to print The Lone Scout for a short time before it was merged as a section of Boys' Life. Some of the more literary Lone Scouts later helped form the National Boy Scout Press Association.

Both the Lone Scout and Lone Cub Scout programs continue to serve boys who cannot take part in a nearby troop or pack on a regular basis because of such factors as distance, time, disability or other difficulties.

== Legacy ==
As a Lone Scout, Charles J. Merlin of Hudson Heights, New Jersey published a tribe paper called the Lone Beaver Tribune or LBT. In 1927 he formed the Elbeetian Legion to tie together former Lone Scouts and published the Elbeetee newsletter until his death in 1995. Merlin was recognized for his work when the BSA awarded him the Silver Buffalo Award in 1986. The Lone Indian Fraternity was formed in 1926 by Ernst Grube of Sheboygan, Wisconsin who published the monthly Lone Indian until his death in 1994. The Lone Scout Memory Lodge was built in 1970 and was located on Cannon Scout Reservation at Camp John J. Barnhardt, Central North Carolina Council in New London, North Carolina. The lodge contains memorabilia from the Lone Scout days and a print shop museum that contains printing presses and type elements used to print many of the tribe papers. In 1970, The Lone Scout Foundation was established to maintain and promote the lodge. In 2006, the building was re-purposed and the collection was transferred to the Ottawa Scouting Museum in Ottawa, Illinois.

In 2019 a Facebook page, "Friends of Lone Scouts of America" (@lonescoutfriends), was started "in the interests of the Elbeetian Legion and Old Timers of the LSA so that they may not forget those friendships that took root in the days of our boyhood." The page acts as an archive of covers and pages of popular newsletters related to the LSA, mainly covering the Elbeetee newsletter and the Lone Indian magazine.

== Notable Lone Scouts ==
- Broderick Crawford; Academy Award-winning actor.
- Douglas Fairbanks, Jr.; Actor and decorated Navy officer who fought in World War II.
- Orval Faubus; Six-term governor of Arkansas.
- Hubert Humphrey; Mayor of Minneapolis, Minnesota and thirty-eighth Vice President of the United States.
- Burl Ives; Academy Award winning American actor and folk music singer and author.
- Fred MacMurray; Actor.
- Don McNeill; Radio personality, best known as the creator and host of The Breakfast Club.
- Harry Morgan; Actor, director, writer and narrator.
- Vincent Schaefer; Chemist and meteorologist who developed cloud seeding.

== See also ==
- Wigwam
