= Age groups in Scouting and Guiding =

Some Scout and Guide organizations in the Scout Movement and Girl Guides, in addition to Scouts, operate other programs for other age groups. Some Scout organizations separate older scout (e.g. senior scouts, Venture Scouts, Explorer Scouts), often specializing in or undertaking more adventurous activities such as Sea Scouts, Air Scouts, high adventure, mounted Scouts and cyclist Scouts.

== History ==
The Scout Movement is a pluralist movement and has always consisted of many Scout organizations. Boy Scouts and Girl Scouts and the Scout Movement were widely established in 1908, before central or national Scout organizations were formed. Scouts is for 11–17 year olds. Many early Scout Troops were connected with or formed a variety of associated organizations for younger boys and girls. Some older youths maintained connection with their former Scout troops.

In 1910, Robert Baden-Powell founded The Boy Scouts Association and the separate Girl Guides organization. In 1916, The Boy Scouts Association launched its Wolf Cubs program for 8- to 10-year-old boys. Baden-Powell did not want Wolf Cubs to be junior scouts and wanted them to be distinct in identity and program from Boy Scouts in order to not give the Scouts a juvenile image. The Boy Scouts Association formed its Rovers program in 1918 for those too old to be Scouts and also formed its Guild of Old Scouts. Some other Scout organizations adopted and operated these or similar programs in connection with their Scouts. The Girl Guides Association formed Brownie Guides for younger girls and Ranger Guides for older girls.

Most of these other age programs use the core principles of the Scout Method but participants in programs for younger ages do not make the Scout Promise.

== Other age programs ==
The following articles contain information on the various other age programs:

Some Scout organizations: Beavers; Cubs; Scouts and senior Scouts; Rovers	Girl Guides: Rainbow Guides; Brownie Guides; Girl Guides; Ranger Guides

In some Scout organizations, a local Scout Group combines Scouts with other age programs in a single organization structure. This is referred to as "family scouting".

The following table contains links to articles with information on specific sectional programmes within the various organisations where available:

== Africa ==
=== Benin ===
-	5	6	7	8	9	10	11	12	13	14	15	16	17	18	19	20	21	22	+
Guides du Bénin
				Jeanettes; 8 to 11 years			Guides; 11 to 16 years					Guides aînées 16 to 25 years							
Scoutisme Béninois
		La meute 6 to 10 years					La troupe 11 to 15 years					Legion; 16 to 19 years				Route; 20 to 23 years			

=== Burkina Faso ===
-	5	6	7	8	9	10	11	12	13	14	15	16	17	18	19	20	21	22	+
Association des Guides du Burkina Faso
			Jeanettes; 7 to 11 years					Guides; 12 to 18 years											
Fédération Burkinabé du Scoutisme
Pré-Louveteaux; Ages under 7 years			Louvetaux; 7 to 12 years					Éclaireurs; 12 to 17 years					Aînés; 17 to 25 years						

=== Burundi ===
-	5	6	7	8	9	10	11	12	13	14	15	16	17	18	19	20	21	22	+
Association des Guides du Burundi
		La Ronde; 6 to 11 years						La Compagnie; 12 to 15 years				L'Essaim; 16 to 19 yeaes				La Route; 20 tô 25 years			
Association des Scouts du Burundi
			Louveteaux; 7 to 11 years					Éclaireurs; 12 to 15years				Routiees; 16 to 19 years							

=== Cameroon ===
-	5	6	7	8	9	10	11	12	13	14	15	16	17	18	19	20	21	22	+
Les Scouts du Cameroun
		Louveteaux; 6 to 11 years					Éclaireurs; 11 to 15 years				Scouts aînés 15 to 19 years				Routiers; 19 to 26 years				

=== Central African Republic ===
-	5	6	7	8	9	10	11	12	13	14	15	16	17	18	19	20	21	22	+
Association Nationale des Guides de Centrafrique
				Jeannette; 8 to 13 years						Guides; 14 to 17 years				Guide aînée 17 years and older					
Fédération du scoutisme centrafricain
		Louveteaux; 6 to 11 years						Scouts; 12 to 17 years					Routiers; 17 years and older						

=== Chad ===
-	5	6	7	8	9	10	11	12	13	14	15	16	17	18	19	20	21	22	+
Association des Guides du Tchad
		Butterfly; 6 to 7 years		Brownie; 8 to 11 years				Guide; 12 to 14 years			Senior Guides; 15 to 18 years								
Fédération du Scoutisme Tchadien
				Louveteaux; 8 to 12 years				Scouts; 12 to 16 years				Routiers; 16 years and older							

=== Democratic Republic of the Congo ===
-	5	6	7	8	9	10	11	12	13	14	15	16	17	18	19	20	21	22	+
Fédération des Scouts de la République démocratique du Congo
		Louveteaux; 6 to 12 years							Scouts; 13 to 17 years					Aînés; 18 to 20 years		Routiers; 20 to 25 years			

=== Côte d'Ivoire ===
-	5	6	7	8	9	10	11	12	13	14	15	16	17	18	19	20	21	22	+
Fédération Ivoirienne du Scoutisme
		Louveteaux / Cubs; 6 to 12 years						Scouts; 12 to 16 years				Routiers / Rovers; 16 years and over							

=== Ethiopia ===
-	5	6	7	8	9	10	11	12	13	14	15	16	17	18	19	20	21	22	+
Ethiopia Scout Association
			Tadagi Scouts; 7 to 11/12 years					Medebegha Scouts; 11/12 to 15/17 years				Wotat Scouts; 15/17 to 18/19 years			Awaki Scouts; 18/19 to 25 years				

=== Gabon ===
-	5	6	7	8	9	10	11	12	13	14	15	16	17	18	19	20	21	22	+
Fédération Gabonaise du Scoutisme
			Cub Scouts; 7 to 11 years					Scouts; 12 to 15 years				Rover Scouts; 16 to 20 years							

=== Ghana ===
-	5	6	7	8	9	10	11	12	13	14	15	16	17	18	19	20	21	22	+
The Ghana Girl Guides Association
Huhuwa Guides; 4 to 7 years			Ananse Guides; 7 to 10 years			Girl Guides; 10 to 14 years				Senior Guides; 14 to 18 years									

=== Kenya ===
-	5	6	7	8	9	10	11	12	13	14	15	16	17	18	19	20	21	22	+
The Kenya Scouts Association
		Sungura; 6 to 11 years						Chipukizi; 12 to 15 years				Mwamba; 16 to 18 years			Rovers; 19 years and over				
Kenya Girl Guides Association
		Brownie; 7 to 11 years						Guide; 10 to 14 years				Ranger Guide; 14 to 18 years			Ranger Cadet; 18 to 25				

=== Mali ===
-	5	6	7	8	9	10	11	12	13	14	15	16	17	18	19	20	21	22	+
Scouts du Mali
			Cub Scouts; 7 to 11 years					Scouts; 12 to 15 years				Rovers; 16 to 20 years							

=== Mauritania ===
-	5	6	7	8	9	10	11	12	13	14	15	16	17	18	19	20	21	22	+
Association des Scouts et Guides de Mauritanie
		Louveteaux / Cubs; 6 to 12 years							Eclaireurs / Scouts; 13 to 17 years					Routiers / Rovers; 18 to 30 years					

=== Morocco ===
-	5	6	7	8	9	10	11	12	13	14	15	16	17	18	19	20	21	22	+
Fédération Nationale du Scoutisme Marocain
			Louveteaux; 7 to 11 years					Eclaireurs; 12 to 17 years						Routiers; 17 to 25 years					

=== Mozambique ===
-	5	6	7	8	9	10	11	12	13	14	15	16	17	18	19	20	21	22	+
Liga dos Escuteiros de Moçambique
		Lobitos; 6 to 10 years				Exploradores juniores 10 to 14 years				Exploradores séniores 14 to 17 years			Caminheiros; 17 to 24 years						

=== Nigeria ===
-	5	6	7	8	9	10	11	12	13	14	15	16	17	18	19	20	21	22	+
The Nigerian Girl Guides Association
Sunbeams; 4 to 6 years			Brownies; 7 to 10 years			Guides; 10 to 16 years						Rangers/Cadets; 16 to 18 years							

=== Rwanda ===
-	5	6	7	8	9	10	11	12	13	14	15	16	17	18	19	20	21	22	+
Rwanda Scouts Association
				Cubs; 8 to 12 years					Scouts; 13 to 15 years			Companions; 16 to 18 years			Rovers; 18 to 25 years				

=== Senegal ===
-	5	6	7	8	9	10	11	12	13	14	15	16	17	18	19	20	21	22	+
Confédération Sénégalaise du Scoutisme
		Jiwu Wi; 6 to 11 years						Lawtan Wi; 12 to 14 years			Toor-Toor Wi; 15 to 18 years			Meneef Mi; 18 to 35 years					

=== Seychelles ===
-	5	6	7	8	9	10	11	12	13	14	15	16	17	18	19	20	21	22	+
Seychelles Scout Association
			Cub Scouts; 7 to 11 years					Boy Scouts; 12 to 15 years				Rover Scouts; 16 to 20 years							

=== South Africa ===
-	5	6	7	8	9	10	11	12	13	14	15	16	17	18	19	20	21	22	+
Girl Guides South Africa
Teddies; 4 1/2 to 7 years				Brownies; 7 to 10 years			Guides; 10 to 14 years				Rangers; 14 to 25 years								
Scouts South Africa
				Cub Scouts; 7 to 10 1/2 years				Scouts, Air Scouts, Sea Scouts; 10 1/2 to 18 years							Rovers; 18 to 30 years				

=== Sudan ===
-	5	6	7	8	9	10	11	12	13	14	15	16	17	18	19	20	21	22	+
Sudan Scouts Association
		Cub Scouts; 6 to 11 years						Boy Scouts; 12 to 16 years					Rover Scouts; 17 to 21 years						

=== Tanzania ===
-	5	6	7	8	9	10	11	12	13	14	15	16	17	18	19	20	21	22	+
Tanzania Scouts Association
	Kabu; 5 to 10 years						Junia; 11 to 15 years					Sinia; 16 to 20 years					Rova; 21 to 35 years		

=== Togo ===
-	5	6	7	8	9	10	11	12	13	14	15	16	17	18	19	20	21	22	+
Association Scoute du Togo
			Louveteaux; 7 to 11 years					Eclaireurs; 12 to 17 years						Batisseurs; 18 to 30 years					
											Eclaireurs Aines; 15 to 18 years								

=== Tunisia ===
-	5	6	7	8	9	10	11	12	13	14	15	16	17	18	19	20	21	22	+
Les Scouts Tunisiens
			Louveteaux, Cub Scouts; 7 to 12 years					Eclaireurs, Scouts; 12 to 16 years				Raiders; 16 to 18 years		Routiers, Rovers; 18 years and older					

== Asia ==
=== Afghanistan ===
-	5	6	7	8	9	10	11	12	13	14	15	16	17	18	19	20	21	22	+
Afghanistan Scout Association
				Cubs; 8 to 12 years				Scouts; 12 to 18 years							Rovers; 19 to 25 years				

=== Armenia ===
-	5	6	7	8	9	10	11	12	13	14	15	16	17	18	19	20	21	22	+
National Association of Girl Guides and Girl Scouts of Armenia
		Artswikner; 6 to 10 years					Arenushner; 11 to 15 years					Parmanuhiner; 16 to 20 years							

=== Bahrain ===
-	5	6	7	8	9	10	11	12	13	14	15	16	17	18	19	20	21	22	+
Boy Scouts of Bahrain
				Al-Ashbal; 8 to 12 years					Al-Kashaf; 12 to 17 years					Al-Matakadem over 17 years					
The Girl Guides Association of Bahrain
			Brownie Guides; 7 to 11 years					Guides; 12 to 15 years				Senior Guides; 16 to 18 years			Ranger Guides; 18 to 23 years				

=== Bangladesh ===
-	5	6	7	8	9	10	11	12	13	14	15	16	17	18	19	20	21	22	+
Bangladesh Scouts
		Cub Scouts; 6 to 11 years					Scouts; 11 to 17 years						Rover Scouts; 17 to 25 years						

=== Brunei ===
-	5	6	7	8	9	10	11	12	13	14	15	16	17	18	19	20	21	22	+
Persekutuan Pengakap Negara Brunei Darussalam
			Cubs; 7 to 11 years					Scouts; 12 to 16 years					Venturers; 17 to 21 years				Rovers; 21 to 30 years		

=== Hong Kong ===
-	5	6	7	8	9	10	11	12	13	14	15	16	17	18	19	20	21	22	+
Hong Kong Girl Guides Association
Happy Bee; 4 to 6 years		Brownie; 6 to 12 years									(Sea) Ranger 15 to 21 years Air Ranger 17 to 21 years						Guider over 21 years		
						Guide; 10 to 18 years													Golden Guide over 60 years
The Scout Association of Hong Kong
	Grasshopper Scouts; 5 to 8 years						Scouts; 11 to 16 years							Rover Scouts; 18 to 26 years					
			Cub Scouts; 7.5 to 12 years								Venture Scouts; 15 to 21 years								

=== India ===
-	5	6	7	8	9	10	11	12	13	14	15	16	17	18	19	20	21	22	+
The Bharat Scouts and Guides
Bunnies; 3 to 6 years		Cubs; 5 to 10 years				Scouts; 10 to 17 years							Rovers; 16 to 25 years						
		Bulbuls; 5 to 10 years				Guides; 10 to 18 years								Rangers; 16 to 25 years					

=== Indonesia ===
-	5	6	7	8	9	10	11	12	13	14	15	16	17	18	19	20	21	22	+
Gerakan Pramuka
		Cub Scouts (Siaga); 7 to 10 years					Scouts (Penggalang); 11 to 15 years					Rover Scouts (Penegak); 16 to 20 years						Venture Scouts (Pandega); 21 to 25 years	

=== Japan ===
-	5	6	7	8	9	10	11	12	13	14	15	16	17	18	19	20	21	22	+
Girl Scouts of Japan
	Tenderfoot; 5 years	Brownie; 6 to 8 years			Junior; 9 to 11 years			Senior; 12 to 14 years			Rangers; 15 to 17 years								
Scout Association of Japan
		Beaver; 6 to 8 years		Cub; 8 to 11 years			Scout; 11 to 15 years							Rover; 18 and older (normally to 24)					
										Venture; 14 to 19 years									

=== Kazakhstan ===
-	5	6	7	8	9	10	11	12	13	14	15	16	17	18	19	20	21	22	+
Organization of the Scout Movement of Kazakhstan
			Junior Scouts; 7 to 10 years				Scouts; 11 to 14 years				Senior Scouts; 15 to 17 years								

=== Kyrgyzstan ===
-	5	6	7	8	9	10	11	12	13	14	15	16	17	18	19	20	21	22	+
Kyrgyz Republic Scouting Union
			Cub Scouts; 7 to 11 years					Scouts; 12 to 15 years				Rovers; 16 to 20 years							

=== Lebanon ===
-	5	6	7	8	9	10	11	12	13	14	15	16	17	18	19	20	21	22	+
Association des Eclaireuses du Liban
				Zahrat; 8 to 11 years				Eclaireuses; 12 to 14 years			Caravelles; 15 to 17 years								
Association des Guides du Liban
		Farandoles; 6 to 7 years		Jeannettes; 8 to 11 years				Guides; 12 to 15 years			Caravelles; 15 to 17 years			Jeunes en Marche; 18 to 21 years					
Lebanese Scout Association
	Beavers; 5 to 7 years		Cubs; 7 to 11 years				Scouts; 11 to 16 years					Rovers; 16 to 18 years							

=== Macau ===
-	5	6	7	8	9	10	11	12	13	14	15	16	17	18	19	20	21	22	+
Associação de Escoteiros de Macau
			Cub Scouts; 7 to 11 years					Scouts; 12 to 15 years				Rovers; 16 to 20 years							

=== Malaysia ===
-	5	6	7	8	9	10	11	12	13	14	15	16	17	18	19	20	21	22	+
Persekutuan Pengakap Malaysia
						Pengakap Kanak-Kanak; 10 to 12 years			Pengakap Muda; 13 to 15 1/2 years			Pengakap Remaja; 15 1/2 to 17 1/2 years			Pengakap Kelana; 17 1/2 years and older				
Persatuan Pandu Puteri Malaysia
			Pandu Puteri Tunas; 7 to 12 years						Pandu Puteri Remaja; 12 to 15 years			Pandu Puteri Renjer; 15 to 18 years							

=== Mongolia ===
-	5	6	7	8	9	10	11	12	13	14	15	16	17	18	19	20	21	22	+
Mongolyn Skautyn Kholboo
			Cubs; 7 to 11 years					Scouts; 12 to 17 years						Rovers; 17 years and older					

=== Nepal ===
-	5	6	7	8	9	10	11	12	13	14	15	16	17	18	19	20	21	22	+
Nepal Scouts
			Cubs; 7 to 11 years					Scouts; 12 to 16 years					Rovers; 17 to 25 years						

=== Pakistan ===
-	5	6	7	8	9	10	11	12	13	14	15	16	17	18	19	20	21	22	+
Pakistan Boy Scouts Association
			Shaheen Scouts, Cubs; 7 to 11 years					Scouts; 12 to 16 years					Rovers; 17 to 25 years						
Pakistan Girl Guides Association
Junior Guides; 11 years and younger								Girl Guides; 12 to 16 years					Senior Guides; 17 to 21 years						

=== Philippines ===
-	5	6	7	8	9	10	11	12	13	14	15	16	17	18	19	20	21	22	+
Boy Scouts of the Philippines
Kabataang Imumulat-Diwa; 4 to 5 years		Kabataang Alay sa Bayan (KAB Scouts); 6 to 9 years				Boy Scouts; 10 to 12 years			Senior Scouts; 13 to 17 years				Rover Scouts; 16 to 24 years						Rover Peers; 24 years and older
Girl Scouts of the Philippines
Twinkler; 4 to 6 years		Star Scout; 6 to 9 years				Junior Scout; 10 to 12 years			Senior Scout; 13 to 16 years				Cadet; 17 to 21 years or older						

=== Singapore ===
-	5	6	7	8	9	10	11	12	13	14	15	16	17	18	19	20	21	22	+
Girl Guides Singapore
			Brownies; 7 to 12 years					Guides; 12 to 17 years						Young adults 18 years and older					
The Singapore Scout Association
			Cub Scouts; 7 to 12 years					Scouts; 12 to 16 years				Venture Scouts; 15 to 18 years			Rover Scouts; 17 to 25 years				

=== Sri Lanka ===
-	5	6	7	8	9	10	11	12	13	14	15	16	17	18	19	20	21	22	+
The Sri Lanka Girl Guides Association
			Kuda Mithuriye (Little Friend); 7 to 11 years				Baladhakshika (Guide); 11 to 16 years				Jayeshta Baladhakshika (Senior Guide); 16 to 23 years								
Sri Lanka Scout Association
Singithi; 5 to 7 years			Cubs; 7 to 11 years				Scouts; 10 1/2 to 14 1/2 years				Seniors; 14 1/2 to 17 1/2 years			Rovers; 17 1/2 to 26 years					

=== Taiwan ===
-	5	6	7	8	9	10	11	12	13	14	15	16	17	18	19	20	21	22	+
Scouts of China
		Beaver; 6 to 8 years		Cub; 8 to 12 years				Scout; 11 to 15 years			Senior; 14 to 18 years			Rover; 18 to 26 years					
Girl Scouts of Taiwan
	Tadpole; 5 to 7 years		Brownie; 7 to 11 years				Girl Scouts; 11 to 15 years				Ranger; 15 to 17 years		Senior; 17 to 21 (or 22) years						Hueychi; 23+ years

=== Tajikistan ===
-	5	6	7	8	9	10	11	12	13	14	15	16	17	18	19	20	21	22	+
Ittihodi Scouthoi Tojikiston
			Cub Scouts; 7 to 11 years					Scouts; 12 to 15 years				Rovers; 16 to 20 years							

=== Thailand ===
-	5	6	7	8	9	10	11	12	13	14	15	16	17	18	19	20	21	22	+
National Scout Organization of Thailand
				Cub Scouts; 8 to 11 years				Scouts; 11 to 16 years											
										Senior Scouts; 14 to 18 years					Rovers, Sea Scouts, Air Scouts; 19 to 25 years				

=== Vietnam ===
-	5	6	7	8	9	10	11	12	13	14	15	16	17	18	19	20	21	22	+
Vietnamese Scout Association
Beaver Scouts (Nhi sinh); 4 to 7 years			Cub Scouts (Ấu sinh); 7 to 11 years				Scouts (Thiếu sinh); 11 to 15 years				Venture Scouts (Kha sinh); 15 to 18 years			Rover Scouts (Tráng sinh); 18 to 25 years					
Vietnamese Girl Scouts- Hướng đạo Nữ Việt Nam
Rainbows (Nhi nữ); 4 to 7 years			Brownies (Ấu nữ); 7 to 11 years				Guides (Thiếu nữ); 11 to 15 years				Ventures (Kha nữ); 15 to 18 years			Rangers (Tráng nữ); 18 to 25 years					

== Europe ==
=== Austria ===
-	5	6	7	8	9	10	11	12	13	14	15	16	17	18	19	20	21	22	+
Pfadfinder und Pfadfinderinnen Österreichs
	Biber; 5 to 7 years			Wichtel & Wölflinge; 7 to 10 years			Guides & Späher; 10 to 13 years			Caravelles & Explorer; 13 to 16 years			Ranger & Rover; 16 to 20 years						

=== Belgium ===
-	5	6	7	8	9	10	11	12	13	14	15	16	17	18	19	20	21	22	+
FOS Open Scouting
	Bevers, Zeehonden; 5 to 7 years			Welpen; 8 to 10 years			JVG, Aspiranten; 11 to 13 years			VG, Juniors; 14 to 15 years		Seniors; 16 to 17 years							
					Wolven; 9 to 11 years														
Guides Catholiques de Belgique
	Nutons; 5 to 7 years			Lutins; 7 to 11 years				Aventure; 11 to 15 years				Horizon; 15 to 17 years		Routiers over 17 years					
	Les Intrépides; Extension Scouts																		
Les Scouts - Fédération Catholique des Scouts Baden-Powell de Belgique
		Baladins; 6 to 8 years			Louveteaux; 8 to 12 years				Eclaireurs; 12 to 16 years				Pionniers; 16 to 18 years						
Scouts en Gidsen Vlaanderen
		Kapoenen; 6 to 8 years			Welpen, Kabouters; 8 to 11 years			Jonggidsen, Jongverkenners; 11 to 14 years			Gidsen, Verkenners, 14 to 17 years			Jins; 17 to 18 years					
		Zeehondjes; 6 to 8 years			Zeewelpen; 8 to 11 years			Scheepsmakkers; 11 to 14 years			Zeeverkenners; 14 to 17 years			Loodsen; 17 to 18 years					
		Akabe; Extension Scouts																	
Scouts et Guides Pluralistes de Belgique
	Castors; 5 to 8 years				Louveteaux; 8 to 12 years				Guides, Scouts; 12 to 15 years			Pionniers; 15 to 18 years							
Guedes et Scouts d’Europe Belgique
		les Castors / Bevers; 6 to 8 years			les Louveteaux et Louvettes; 8 to 12 years				les Éclaireurs et Éclaireuses; 12 to 17 years					les Routiers et Guides-Aînées over 17					

=== Bosnia and Herzegovina ===
-	5	6	7	8	9	10	11	12	13	14	15	16	17	18	19	20	21	22	+
Savez Izvidaca Federacije Bosne i Hercegovine
	Cicibani; 5 to 7 years			Poletarci i Pčelice; 7 to 11 years				Mlađi Izviđači i Planinke; 12 to 14 years			Izviđači o Planinke; 15 to 18 years								

=== Bulgaria ===
-	5	6	7	8	9	10	11	12	13	14	15	16	17	18	19	20	21	22	+
Organisation of Bulgarian Scouts
			Wolves; 7 to 11 years					Scouts; 11 to 15 years				Venturers; 15 to 18 years			Rovers; 18 to 26 years				

=== Croatia ===
-	5	6	7	8	9	10	11	12	13	14	15	16	17	18	19	20	21	22	+
Savez izvidaca Hrvatske
		Poletarci, Pcelice; 6 to 11 years						Izvidjaci, Planinke; 10 to 15 years				Istrazivaci; 14 to 18 years			Senior; 18 to 25 years				

=== Cyprus ===
-	5	6	7	8	9	10	11	12	13	14	15	16	17	18	19	20	21	22	+
Girl Guides Association of Cyprus
	Chrysalids; 5 to 6 years		Butterflies; 7 to 9 years			Guides; 10 to 12 years			Sea Guides, Air Guides, Forest Guides; 13 to 15 years			Senior Guides, Prospective Leaders; 16 to 18 years							
Cyprus Scouts Association
			Lykopoulas; 7 to 11 years					Scouts; 11 to 14 years			Explorer; 14 to 18 years				Scout Network; 18 to 26 years				

=== Czech Republic ===
-	5	6	7	8	9	10	11	12	13	14	15	16	17	18	19	20	21	22	+
Junák
	Benjamínci; 5 to 7 years			Vlčata, Sětlušky; 8 to 10 years			Skauti, Skautky; 11 to 14 years				Roveři, Rangers; 15 to 26 years								

=== Denmark ===
-	5	6	7	8	9	10	11	12	13	14	15	16	17	18	19	20	21	22	+
Det Danske Spejderkorps
Family Scout; 3 to 6 years			Micro Scout; 6 to 8 years		Mini Scout; 8 to 10 years		Junior Scouts; 10 to 12 years		Troop Scout; 12 to 16 years				Clan Scout; 16 to 24 years						
KFUM-Spejderne i Danmark (YMCA-Scouts of Denmark),
Family Scout; 3 to 6 years			Beaver; 6 to 8 years		Wolf; 8 to 10 years		Junior; 10 to 12 years		Trop; 12 to 15 years			Senior Scout; 16 to 17 years		Rover over 17					
The Green Girl Scouts
Game Scouts; 3 to 5 years		Sprouts; 6 to 7 years		Green Nut; 8 to 9 years		Scouts; 10 to 14 years					Senior Scout; 15 to 17 tests			Ranger over 17					

=== Estonia ===
-	5	6	7	8	9	10	11	12	13	14	15	16	17	18	19	20	21	22	+
Eesti Skautide Ühing
		Hundud; 6 to 10 years					Skaudid; 11 to 14 years				Vanemskaudid; 15 to 17 years			Rändurid; 18 to 26 years					

=== Finland ===
-	5	6	7	8	9	10	11	12	13	14	15	16	17	18	19	20	21	22	+
Suomen Partiolaiset - Finlands Scouter ry
			sudenpennut 7 to 9 years			seikkailijat 10 to 12 years		tarpojat 12 to 15 years			samoajat 15 to 17 years			vaeltajat 18 to 22 years					aikuiset 22 years and older

=== France ===
-	5	6	7	8	9	10	11	12	13	14	15	16	17	18	19	20	21	22	+
Association des Guides et Scouts d'Europe
				louveteaux, louvettes 8 to 12 years				éclaireurs, éclaireuses 12 to 17 years					routiers, guides aînées 17 years and over						
Éclaireuses et Éclaireurs de France
		lutins, lutines 6 to 8 years		louveteaux, louvettes 8 to 11 years			éclaireurs, éclaireuses 11 to 15 years				aînés 15 to 18 years			Jeunes adultes éclés 18 to 25 years					
Eclaireuses et Eclaireurs israélites de France
				bâtisseurs, bâtissettes 8 to 11 years			éclaireurs, éclaireures 11 to 15 years				perspectives 15 to 17 years			compagnons then aînés 18 years and over					
Eclaireuses et Eclaireurs unionistes de France
				louveteaux, louvettes 8 to 12 years				éclaireurs, éclaireures 12 to 16 years				aînés 16 to 19 years							
Eclaireurs Neutres de France
				louveteaux, louvettes 8 to 11 years				éclaireurs, éclaireuses 12 to 16 years					routiers, ainées 17 to 20 years						
Fédération des éclaireuses et éclaireurs
				louveteaux, louvettes 8 to 11 years				éclaireurs, éclaireuses 12 to 16 years					routiers, ainées 17 years and over						
Scouts et Guides de France
		farfadets 6 to 8 years		louveteaux, jeannettes 8 to 11 years			scouts, guides 11 to 14 years			pionniers, caravelles 14 to 17 years			compagnons 17 to 20 years						
Scouts Musulmans de France
			voyageurs, voyageuses 7 to 11 years				éclaireurs, éclaireuses 11 to 14 years			pionniers, pionnières 14 to 17 years			compagnons, compagnonnes 17 to 21 years						
Scouts unitaires de France
				louveteaux, jeannettes 8 to 12 years				éclaireurs, guides 12 to 17 years					routiers, guides-aînées 17 years and over						

=== Georgia ===
-	5	6	7	8	9	10	11	12	13	14	15	16	17	18	19	20	21	22	+
Sakartvelos Gogona Skautebis Asociacia 'Dia'
			Baya; 7 to 9 years			Tsitsinatela; 10 to 15 years						Dia; 16 to 32 years							
Sakartvelos Skauturi Modzraobis Organizatsia
			Cub Scouts; 7 to 11 years					Scouts; 12 to 15 years				Rovers; 16 to 20 years							

=== Germany ===
-	5	6	7	8	9	10	11	12	13	14	15	16	17	18	19	20	21	22	+
Bund der Pfadfinderinnen und Pfadfinder
			Wölflinge; 7 to 11 years					Pfadfinderinnen, Pfadfinder; 11 to 15 years				Ranger, Rover; 16 to 25 years							
Deutsche Pfadfinderschaft Sankt Georg
			Wölflinge; 7 to 10 years				Jungpfadfinder; 10 to 13 years			Pfadfinder; 13 to 16 years			Rover; 16 to 20 years						
Evangelischen Pfadfinderschaft Europas
			Wölfinge, Wölflingsmädchen; 7 to 11 years					Pfadfinder, Pfadfinderinnen; 12 to 17 years					Raider; 17 to 19 years		Rover, Ranger; 19 years and over				
Katholische Pfadfinderschaft Europas
				Wölflingsmädchen; 8 to 11 years			Pfadfinderinnen; 11 to 16 years					Ranger; 16 years and over							
				Wölflingsjungen; 8 to 12 years				Pfadfinder; 12 to 17 years					Rover; 17 years and over						
Pfadfinderinnenschaft Sankt Georg
			Wichtel; 7 to 10 years				Pfadfinderinnen; 10 to 13 years			Caravelles; 13 to 16 years			Ranger; 16 years and older						
Verband Christlicher Pfadfinderinnen und Pfadfinder
			Kinder; 7 to 10 years				Pfadfinderinnen, Pfadfinder; 10 to 15 years					Ranger, Rover; 16 to 20 years							

=== Greece ===
-	5	6	7	8	9	10	11	12	13	14	15	16	17	18	19	20	21	22	+
Soma Hellinikou Odigismou (Greek Guiding Association)
	Asteria (Stars); 5 to 7 years		Poulia (Birds); 7 to 11 years				Odigoi (Guides); 11 to 14 years			Megaloi Odigoi (Senior Guides), Naftodigoi (Sea Guides); 14 to 17 years									
Soma Hellinon Proskopon (Greek Scout Association)
			Likopoula (Cub Scouts); 6 to 10 years				Proskopoi (Scouts); 10 to 14 years				Anixneutes (Ventures); 14 to 18 years			Proskopiko Diktyo (Scout Network); 18 to 24 years					Adult leaders (18+)

=== Hungary ===
-	5	6	7	8	9	10	11	12	13	14	15	16	17	18	19	20	21	22	+
Magyar Cserkészszövetség
		Cub Scouts; 6 to 10 years				Scouts; 10 to 14 years				Rovers; 14 to 21 years									

=== Iceland ===
-	5	6	7	8	9	10	11	12	13	14	15	16	17	18	19	20	21	22	+
Bandalag íslenskra skáta
Drekaskátar; 7 to 9 years			Fálkaskátar; 10 to 12 years			Dróttskátar; 13 to 15 years			Rekkaskátar; 16 to 18 years				Róverskátar; 19 to 25 years				Óverskátar; 26< years		

=== Republic of Ireland and/or Northern Ireland ===
Guiding and Scouting in Northern Ireland are administered by Irish and UK organisations, respectively.

-	5	6	7	8	9	10	11	12	13	14	15	16	17	18	19	20	21	22	+
Catholic Guides of Ireland
	Cygnet Guides; 5 to 6 years		Brigin Guides; 6 to 11 years					Guides; 10 to 14 years			Rangers; 14 to 17 years								
Irish Girl Guides
	Ladybirds; 5 to 7 years			Brownies; 6 1/2 to 11 years				Guides; 10 1/2 to 15 years				Senior Branch; 14 1/2 to 21 years							
Scouting Ireland
		Beaver Scouts; 6 to 8 years			Cub Scouts (Macaoimh); 9 to 11 years			Scouts; 12 to 15 years				Venture Scouts; 15 to 17 years		Rover Scouts; 18 to 25 years					
Girlguiding Ulster
Rainbows; 4 to 7 years				Brownies; 7 to 10 years			Guides; 10 to 14 years				Rangers; 14 to 18 years				Inspire; 18 to 30 years				Trefoil Guild; 18+ years

=== Italy ===
-	5	6	7	8	9	10	11	12	13	14	15	16	17	18	19	20	21	22	+
Associazione Guide e Scouts Cattolici Italiani (AGESCI)
			Lupetti; 7/8 to 11/12 years					Esploratori, Guide; 11/12 to 16 years					Rover, Scolte; 16 to 21 years						
Corpo Nazionale Giovani Esploratori ed Esploratrici Italiani (CNGEI)
				Lupetti; 8 to 12 years					Esploratori, Esploratrici; 13 to 16 years				Rover; 16 to 19 years						
Associazione Italiana Guide e Scouts d'Europa Cattolici - Federazione dello Scoutismo Europeo (FSE)
				Lupetti, Coccinelle; 8 to 11 years				Esploratori, Guide; 11 to 16 years					Rover, Scolte; 16 to 21 years						
Südtiroler Pfadfinderschaft
				Wölflinge; 8 to 11 years			Jungpfadfinder; 11 to 14 years			Pfadfinder; 14 to 16 years		Rover; 16 years and older							

=== Latvia ===
-	5	6	7	8	9	10	11	12	13	14	15	16	17	18	19	20	21	22	+
Latvijas Skautu un Gaidu Centrala Organizacija
			Mazskauts, Guntiņa; 7 to 11 years					Skauts, Gaida; 12 to 14 years			Dižskauts, Dižgaida; 15 to 17 years			Rovers, Lielgaida; 18 years and older					

=== Liechtenstein ===
-	5	6	7	8	9	10	11	12	13	14	15	16	17	18	19	20	21	22	+
Pfadfinder und Pfadfinderinnen Liechtensteins
			Bienli, Wölfle; 7 to 11 years				Pfadfinderinnen, Pfadfinder; 11 to 15 years				Pionier; 15 to 18 years			Ranger, Rover; 18 years and older					

=== Lithuania ===
-	5	6	7	8	9	10	11	12	13	14	15	16	17	18	19	20	21	22	+
Lietuvos Skautija
		Cub Scouts; 6 to 10 years				Scouts; 10 to 14 years				Venture Scouts; 14 to 18 years			Ranger, Rover; 17 to 25 years						

=== Luxembourg ===
-	5	6	7	8	9	10	11	12	13	14	15	16	17	18	19	20	21	22	+
Fédération Nationale des Eclaireurs et Eclaireuses du Luxembourg
	Beavers; 5 to 7 years			Wëllefcher; 8 to 11 years				Scouten, Guiden; 12 to 14 years			Explorers; 15 to 18 years				Routiers; 18 to 26 years				
Lëtzebuerger Guiden a Scouten
	Biber; 5 to 8 years			Wëllefcher; 8 to 11 years			Aventuren, Explorer (AvEx); 11 to 14 years			Caravellen, Pionéier (CaraPio); 14 to 17 years			Ranger, Rover (RaRo); 17 to 23 years						

=== Macedonia ===
-	5	6	7	8	9	10	11	12	13	14	15	16	17	18	19	20	21	22	+
Sojuz na Izvidnici na Makedonija
			Cub Scouts; 7 to 10 years					Scouts; 11 to 14 years				Explorers; 15 to 17 years					Rovers; 18 to 29 years		

=== Malta ===
-	5	6	7	8	9	10	11	12	13	14	15	16	17	18	19	20	21	22	+
The Malta Girl Guides Association
	Dolphins; 5 to 7 years		Brownies; 7 to 10 years			Guides; 10 to 14 years				Rangers; 14 to 18 years									

=== Moldova ===
-	5	6	7	8	9	10	11	12	13	14	15	16	17	18	19	20	21	22	+
Organizatia Nationala a Scoutilor din Moldova
			Cub Scouts; 7 to 11 years					Scouts; 12 to 15 years				Rovers; 16 to 20 years							

=== Monaco ===
-	5	6	7	8	9	10	11	12	13	14	15	16	17	18	19	20	21	22	+
Association des Guides et Scouts de Monaco
			Louveteaux; 7 to 10 years				Rangers; 11 to 13 years			Pionniers; 14 to 16 years			Compagnons; 17 to 18 years						

=== The Netherlands ===
-	5	6	7	8	9	10	11	12	13	14	15	16	17	18	19	20	21	22	+
Scouting Nederland
	Bevers; 5 to 7 years			Welpen; 7 to 11 years				Scouts; 11 to 15 years				Explorers; 15 to 18 years			Roverscouts; 18 to 21 years			Plusscouts; 21 years and older	

=== Norway ===
-	5	6	7	8	9	10	11	12	13	14	15	16	17	18	19	20	21	22	+
Norwegian Guide and Scout Association
		Bevere (Beavers); School Years 1 & 2		Småspeidere/ Ulvunger (Wolf Cubs); School Years 3 & 4		Stifinnere/Vandrere (Pathfinders/Walkers); School Year 5 to School Year 10						Rovere (Rovers); 16 to 25 years of age							
YWCA-YMCA Guides and Scouts of Norway
Familiespeiding (Family Scouting); Pre school children along with family		Oppdagere (Detectors); 6 to 7 years		Stifinnere (Pathfinders); 8 to 9 years		Vandrere (Walkers); 10 to 15 years						Rovere (Rovers); 16 to 25 years							

=== Poland ===
-	5	6	7	8	9	10	11	12	13	14	15	16	17	18	19	20	21	22	+
Polish Scouting Association
		Cub Scouts, Brownies; 6 to 10 years				Scouts, Guides; 10 to 13 years			Venture Scouts, Venture Guides; 13 to 16 years			Rovers, Rangers; 16 to 21 years					Seniors; 21 years and older without The Instrutor's Obligation		
Scouting Association of the Republic (Poland)
			Cub Scouts; 7 to 10 years				Boy Scouts, Girl Scouts; 11 to 14 years				Boy Wanderers, Girl Wanderers; 15 to 18 years				Senior Boy Scouts, Senior Girl Scouts; 18 years and older				

=== Portugal ===
-	5	6	7	8	9	10	11	12	13	14	15	16	17	18	19	20	21	22	+
Corpo Nacional de Escutas - Escutismo Católico Português
		Lobitos/ Alcateia; 6 to 10 years				Exploradores/ Expedição; 10 to 14 years				Pioneiros/ Comunidade; 14 to 18 years				Caminheiros/ Clã; 18 to 22 years					
Associação dos Escoteiros de Portugal
			Alcateia; 7 to 10 years			Tribo de Escoteiros; 10 to 14 years				Tribo de Exploradores; 14 to 17 years			Clã; 17 to 21 years						
Associação Guias de Portugal
		Avezinha; 6 to 10 years				Guia Aventura; 10 to 14 years				Guia Caravela; 14 to 17 years			Guia Moínho; 17 years and older						

=== Romania ===
-	5	6	7	8	9	10	11	12	13	14	15	16	17	18	19	20	21	22	+
Asociația Ghidelor și Ghizilor din România
			Flori; 7 to 11 years				Ghizi; 11 to 14 years			Ghizi Mari; 14 to 18 years				Aventurieri; 18 to 25 years					
Cercetaşii României
			Lupisori; 7 to 11 years				Temerari; 11 to 15 years				Exploratori; 15 to 18 years			Seniori; 18 to 21 years				Lideri; 21 years and older	
Cercetaşii Munțiilor
			Lupișori/Pui de Lup; 7 to 12 years				Cercetași/Cercetașe; 12 to 17 years			Drumeți/Călăuze; 17 years and older									

=== Serbia ===
-	5	6	7	8	9	10	11	12	13	14	15	16	17	18	19	20	21	22	+
Savez Izviđača Srbije
			Poletarci, Pcelice; 7 to 10 years				Mladi Izvidaci, Mlade Planinke; 11 to 14 years			Izvidaci, Planinke; 14 to 20 years									

=== Slovakia ===
-	5	6	7	8	9	10	11	12	13	14	15	16	17	18	19	20	21	22	+
Slovenský skauting
			Cubs, Brownies; 7 to 10 years				Scouts; 11 to 14 years				Rangers; 15 to 18 years				Rovers; 19 to 22 years				

=== Slovenia ===
-	5	6	7	8	9	10	11	12	13	14	15	16	17	18	19	20	21	22	+
Združenje slovenskih katoliških skavtinj in skavtov
		Bobri; 6 to 7 years	Volkuljice, Volčiči; 7 to 11 years				Vodnice, Izvidniki; 11 to 16 years					Popotnice, Popotniki; 16 to 21 years							
Zveza tabornikov Slovenije
Murni up to 7 years			Medvedki, Cebelice; 7 to 11 years				Gozdovniki, Gozdovnice; 11 to 16 years					Popotniki, Popotnice; 16 to 21 years						Raziskovalci, Raziskovalke; 21 to 27 years	Grce; 27 years and older

=== Spain ===
-	5	6	7	8	9	10	11	12	13	14	15	16	17	18	19	20	21	22	+
Federación de Scouts-Exploradores de España
		Colonia, Castores/as; 6 to 8 years			Manada, Lobatos/as; 8 to 11			Tropa Scout, Troperos/as; 11 to 14			Unidad Esculta, Escultas; 14 to 17			Clan, Rovers; 17 to 20 years			Kraal, Scouters; 21 and older		
Movimiento Scout Católico
		Colonia, Castores/as; 6 to 8 years			Manada, Lobatos/as; 9 to 11			Tropa, Exploradores/as; 12 to 14			Unidad/Avanzada, Pioneros/as; 15 to 17			Clan, Rutas; 18 to 21-23 years			Kraal, Scouters; 21 and older		
Federacion Española de Guidismo
		Age group naming is determined by the member organisations of the federation.																	
		6 to 7 years		8 to 11 years				12 to 14 years			15 to 16 years		17 to 18 years						
Catalonia
Minyons Escoltes i Guies de Catalunya
		Castors i Llúdrigues; 6 to 8 years		Llops i Daines; 8 to 11 years			Ràngers i Noies Guies; 11 to 14 years			Pioners i Caravel·les; 14 to 17 years			Truc; 17 to 19 years						
Escoltes Catalans
		Follets; 6 to 9 years			Llops; 9 to 12 years			Raiers; 12 to 15 years			Pioners; 15 to 17 years		El Clan; 17 and over						
Acció Escolta de Catalunya
		Colònia; 6 to 9 years			Estol; 9 to 12 years			Secció; 12 to 15 years			Unitat; 15 to 18 years			Clan; 18 to 20 years					

=== Sweden ===
-	5	6	7	8	9	10	11	12	13	14	15	16	17	18	19	20	21	22	+
Scouterna
				Spårarscout (Tracker); 8 to 10 years		Upptäckarscout (Discoverer); 10 to 12 years		Äventyrarscout (Adventurer); 12 to 15 years			Utmanarscout (Challenger); 15 to 18 years				Roverscout (Rover); 19 to 25 years				Scoutvoluntär; 25+ years

=== Switzerland ===
-	5	6	7	8	9	10	11	12	13	14	15	16	17	18	19	20	21	22	+
Swiss Guide and Scout Movement
	Biber		Bienli, Wölfli			Pfadi				Cordée, Raider, Pio			Rover						
	Castors		Lutin, Louveteau, Louvette			Éclaireuse, Éclaireur				Cordée, Raider, Pionnier			Guide, Routier						
	Castori; 5 to 6 years		Lupetti; 7 to 9/10 years			Esploratrici, Esploratori; 10/11 to 13/14 years				Pionieri; 14/15 to 16 years			Rover; 17 years and older						

=== Turkey ===
-	5	6	7	8	9	10	11	12	13	14	15	16	17	18	19	20	21	22	+
Scouting and Guiding Federation of Turkey
				Cub Scouts; 7 to 11 years				Scouts; 11 to 15 years				Venturer Scouts; 15 to 18 years							

=== Ukraine ===
-	5	6	7	8	9	10	11	12	13	14	15	16	17	18	19	20	21	22	+
Asotsiatsiya Haydiv Ukrayiny
				Swallows; 7 to 11 years				Guides; 11 to 16 years				Rangers; 16 to 20 years							
Plast National Scout Organization of Ukraine
ptashata pry plasti 4 to 7 years				novaky, novachky 7 to 11 years				yunaky, yunachky 12 to 18 years						starshi plastuny, starshi plastunky 18 to 30/35 years					seniory 30/35 years and older
Spilka Ukraïns'koï Molodi
Cymeniata; 3 to 5 years		Molodshe Yunatstvo; 6 to 12 years							Starshe Yunatstvo; 13 to 17 years										

=== United Kingdom ===
Guiding and Scouting in Northern Ireland is served by Irish and UK organisations.

-	5	6	7	8	9	10	11	12	13	14	15	16	17	18	19	20	21	22	+
The Scout Association
Squirrels; 4 to 6 years		Beaver Scouts; 6 to 8 years		Cub Scouts; 8 to 10 1/2 years			Scouts, Air Scouts, Sea Scouts; 10 1/2 to 14 years			Explorer Scouts, Air Explorers, Sea Explorers, Young Leaders; 14 to 18 years				Scout Network (18 to 25 years); Adult Leaders (18+); Scout Active Support (18+)					
Squirrels; 4 to 6 years		Scoutlink; All ages																	
Baden-Powell Scouts' Association
	Beavers; 5 to 8 years			Cubs; 8 to 10 years		Scouts; 10 1/2 to 14				Senior Scouts; 14 to 18				Network Scouts; 18 years and older (training programme 18 to 25)					
			Wolf Cubs; 8 1/2 to 10 years																
British Boy Scouts and British Girl Scouts Association
	Pre-Juniors; 5 to 8 years			Junior Scout; 7 to 11 years			Scouts, 11 to 15 years				Senior Scout; 15 to 18 years				Rover Scout 17+				
	Beaver Cubs; 5 to 8 years			Wolf Cubs; 7 to 11 years					Old Scout										
Girlguiding UK
	Rainbows; 5 to 7 years			Brownies; 7 to 10 years			Guides; 10 to 14 years			Rangers; 14 to 18 years					Inspire; 18 to 30 years				
										Young Leaders; 14 to 18 years					Adult Leaders; 18 to 99 years				

== North America ==
=== Antigua and Barbuda ===
-	5	6	7	8	9	10	11	12	13	14	15	16	17	18	19	20	21	22	+
The Girl Guides Association of Antigua and Barbuda
Teenies; 4 to 6 years		Brownies; 6 to 10 years				Guides; 10 to 15 years					Rangers; 15 to 25 years								

=== Aruba ===
-	5	6	7	8	9	10	11	12	13	14	15	16	17	18	19	20	21	22	+
Het Arubaanse Padvindsters Gilde
			Brownie; 7 to 11 years				Guide; 11 to 17 years						Pioneers; 17 to 21 years						
Scouting Aruba
	Beavers; 5 to 7 years		Cubs; 7 to 10 years			Scouts; 10 to 14 years					Explorers; 15 to 18 years			Rovers; 18 to 23 years					

=== Bahamas ===
-	5	6	7	8	9	10	11	12	13	14	15	16	17	18	19	20	21	22	+
The Bahamas Girl Guides Association
	Sunflowers; 5 to 6 years		Brownies; 7 to 10 years			Guides; 10 to 14 years				Rangers; 14 to 18 years									

=== Barbados ===
-	5	6	7	8	9	10	11	12	13	14	15	16	17	18	19	20	21	22	+
The Girl Guides Association of Barbados
	Blossoms; 5 to 7 years					Girl Guides; 10 to 16 years													
			Brownies; 7 to 11 years							Rangers; 14 to 25 years									

=== Canada ===
-	5	6	7	8	9	10	11	12	13	14	15	16	17	18	19	20	21	22	+
Adventurers of Baden-Powell Association
			Castors, Otters; 7 to 8 years		Louveteaux, Louvettes, Jeanettes, (Girl) Timber Wolves; 9 to 12 years			Éclaireurs, Guides, (Girl) Explorers; 12 to 17 years					Routiers, Guides-ainées, Wayfarers; 17 and older						
Association des Scouts du Canada
			castors, hirondelles 7 to 8 years		louveteaux, exploratrices 9 to 11 years		éclaireurs, intrépides 11 to 14 years				pionniers 15 to 17 years			Scouts-ainés; 18 to 21 years					
BP Service Association in Canada
	Otters; 5 to 7 years			Timber Wolves; 8 to 11 years			Explorers; 11 to 15 years				Senior Explorers; 15 to 17 years			Rover Scouts; 18 years and older					
Canadian Traditional Scouting Association
	Otters; 5 to 7 years			Timber Wolves; 8 to 10 years			Explorers; 11 to 14 years			Senior Explorers; 14 to 17 years				Rover Knights; 18 years and older					
Girl Guides of Canada - Guides du Canada
	Sparks; 5 to 6 years		Embers; 7 to 8 years		Guides; 9 to 11 years			Pathfinders; 12 to 14 years			Rangers; 15 to 17 years			Link; 18 to 30 years					
Scouts Canada
	Beavers; 5 to 7 years			Wolf Cubs; 8 to 10 years			Scouts; 11 to 14 years (optional to 16)				Venturers; 14 to 17 years			Rovers; 18 to 26 years					

=== Costa Rica ===
-	5	6	7	8	9	10	11	12	13	14	15	16	17	18	19	20	21	22	+
Asociación de Guías y Scouts de Costa Rica
			Lobatos; 7 to 11 years				Scouts; 11 to 15 years				Tsuri; 15 to 17 years			Rovers; 18 to 21 years					

=== Dominica ===
-	5	6	7	8	9	10	11	12	13	14	15	16	17	18	19	20	21	22	+
The Girl Guides Association of Dominica
		Brownies; 6 to 10 years								Rangers; 14 to 21 years									
						Guides; 10 to 15 years													

=== Dominican Republic ===
-	5	6	7	8	9	10	11	12	13	14	15	16	17	18	19	20	21	22	+
Asociación de Scouts Dominicanos
			Manada; 7 to 10 years				Tropa; 11 to 16 years						Clan; 17 to 23 years						

=== El Salvador ===
-	5	6	7	8	9	10	11	12	13	14	15	16	17	18	19	20	21	22	+
Asociación de Muchachas Guías de El Salvador
Abejita; 4 to 6 years			Alitas; 6 to 11 years				Intermedias; 11 to 15 years				Guía Mayor; 15 to 18 years								
Asociación de Scouts de El Salvador
			Lobatos; 7 to 11 years				Scouts; 11 to 15 years				Caminantes; 15 to 17 years		Rovers; 17 to 21 years						

=== Guatemala ===
-	5	6	7	8	9	10	11	12	13	14	15	16	17	18	19	20	21	22	+
Asociación Nacional de Muchachas Guías de Guatemala
Abejas; 4 to 6 years			Caperucitas; 7 to 9 years			Guía pequeñas 10 to 12 years			Guía intermedias 13 to 15 years			Guía mayores 16 to 18 years							

=== Haïti ===
-	5	6	7	8	9	10	11	12	13	14	15	16	17	18	19	20	21	22	+
Association Nationale des Guides d'Haïti
			Jeanette; 7 to 12 years					Guide; 12 to 15 years			Guide relais 15 to 18 years			Guide aînée 18 to 25 years					
Association Nationale des Scouts d'Haïti
				Lovetaux; 8 to 11 years			Scouts; 11 to 17 years						Rovers, Routiers; 17 to 22 years						

=== Jamaica ===
-	5	6	7	8	9	10	11	12	13	14	15	16	17	18	19	20	21	22	+
The Girl Guides Association of Jamaica
			Brownie Guide; 7 to 11 years							Ranger Guide; 14 to 20 years									
						Girl Guide; 10 to 16 years													
Girl Scouts of Jamaica
Peenie Wallies; 4 to 8 years, Kindergarten-Grade 3						Junior Scouts; 10 to 16 years, Grades 7–10							Assistant Leaders, 16+ years Leaders, 18+ years						
			Doctorbirds; 7 to 12 years, Grades 3–6							Senior Scouts; 14 to 19 years, Grades 10–13									
The Scout Association of Jamaica
				Cubs; 8 to 10 years			Scouts; 11 to 15 years				Venture Scouts; 15 to 18 years			Service Scouts; 18 to 21 years					

=== Mexico ===
-	5	6	7	8	9	10	11	12	13	14	15	16	17	18	19	20	21	22	+
Asociación de Scouts de México, Asociación Civil
			Lobatos, Lobeznas; 7 to 11 years				Scouts; 11 to 15 years			Caminantes; 15 to 17 years			Rovers; 17 to 21 years						

=== Netherlands Antilles ===
-	5	6	7	8	9	10	11	12	13	14	15	16	17	18	19	20	21	22	+
Padvindstersvereniging van de Nederlandse Antillen
Elvita; 4 to 7 years				Kabouter; 8 to 10 years			Guia Menor; 11 to 14 years				Guia Mayor; 15 to 18 years								

=== Panama ===
-	5	6	7	8	9	10	11	12	13	14	15	16	17	18	19	20	21	22	+
Asociación Nacional de Scouts de Panamá
		Cubs; 6 to 10 years					Scouts; 11 to 14 years				Walkers; 15 to 17 years			Rovers; 18 to 21 years					

=== Trinidad and Tobago ===
-	5	6	7	8	9	10	11	12	13	14	15	16	17	18	19	20	21	22	+
The Scout Association of Trinidad and Tobago
			Cubs; 7 to 11 years				(Sea)Scouts; 11 to 15 years				Venturers; 15 to 19 years								

=== United States ===
-	5	6	7	8	9	10	11	12	13	14	15	16	17	18	19	20	21	22	+
American Heritage Girls
Pathfinder (K)		Tenderheart (grades 1–3)			Explorer (grades 4–6)			Pioneer (grades 7–8)			Patriot (grades 9–12)								
Baden-Powell Service Association
	Otter; 5–7 years			Timberwolf; 8–10 years			Pathfinder; 11–17 years							Rover; 18 years+					
Scouting America (formerly Boy Scouts of America)
	Cub Scouts; 6–11 years						Scouts BSA; 10–17 years												
									Venturing, Sea Scouts; 14–20 years										
Camp Fire
Little Stars (ages 3–5)		Starflight (grades K-2)		Adventure (grades 4–5)			Discovery (grades 6–8)			Horizon (grades 9–12)									
Girl Scouts of the USA
	Girl Scout Daisy (K – grade 1)		Girl Scout Brownie (grades 2–3)		Girl Scout Junior (grades 4–5)		Girl Scout Cadette (grades 6–8)			Girl Scout Senior (grades 9–10)		Girl Scout Ambassador (grades 11–12)			Adult Members (18 years+)				
Trail Life USA
Woodlands Trails (grades K–5)							Navigators (grades 6–8)			Adventurers (grades 9–12)				Guidon; 18–25 years					

== Oceania ==
=== Australia ===
-	5	6	7	8	9	10	11	12	13	14	15	16	17	18	19	20	21	22	+
Girl Guides Australia
	Australian Guide Program: Section names and age groups are determined by the local organization 5 to 18 years													Olave Program; 18 to 30 years					
Scouts Australia
		Joey Scouts; 5 to 8 years		Cub Scouts; 7½ to 10½ years			Scouts; 10½ to 15 years				Venturer Scouts; 15 to 18 years			Rovers; 18 to 26 years					
Baden-Powell Scouts Australia
		Koalas; 6 to 8 years		Wolf Cubs; 7½ to 10½ years			Scouts; 10½ to 15 years				Senior Scouts; 15 to 18 years			Rovers; 18 to 26 years					

=== New Zealand ===
-	5	6	7	8	9	10	11	12	13	14	15	16	17	18	19	20	21	22	+
GirlGuiding New Zealand
	Pippins; 5 to 6 years		Brownies; 7 to 10 years				Guides; 10 to 14 1/2 years												
										Rangers; 13 to 19 years									
Scouting New Zealand
	Keas; 5 to 7 years			Cubs; 8 to 11 years				Scouts; 11 to 16 years				Venturers; 15 to 19 years			Rovers; 18 to 26 years				

=== Papua New Guinea ===
-	5	6	7	8	9	10	11	12	13	14	15	16	17	18	19	20	21	22	+
The Scout Association of Papua New Guinea
				Junior Scouts; 8 to 12 years				Scouts; 12 to 16 years					Senior Scouts; 16 to 25 years						

== South America ==
=== Argentina ===
-	5	6	7	8	9	10	11	12	13	14	15	16	17	18	19	20	21	22	+
Asociación Guías Argentinas
Pimpollitos; 5 to 6 years			Alita; 7 to 9 years			Guía en Caravana; 10 to 12 years			Guía del Sol; 13 to 15 years			Guía Mayor; 16 to 20 years							
Scouts de Argentina
Castores; 5 to 6 years			Lobatos y Lobeznas; 7 to 10 years				Scouts; 10 to 14 years				Caminantes; 14 to 18 years				Rovers; 18 to 22 years				

=== Bolivia ===
-	5	6	7	8	9	10	11	12	13	14	15	16	17	18	19	20	21	22	+
Asociación de Scouts de Bolivia
		Lobatos; 6 to 10 years					Exploradores; 11 to 13 years			Pioneros; 14 to 17 years				Rovers; 18 to 20 years					

=== Brazil ===
-	5	6	7	8	9	10	11	12	13	14	15	16	17	18	19	20	21	22	+
Federação de Bandeirantes do Brasil
		Ciranda; 6 to 8 years			B1; 9 to 11 years			B2; 12 to 15 years			Guia; 15 to 21 years								
União dos Escoteiros do Brasil
Castor (non-official); 4 to 6 years			Lobinho/Lobinha; 7 to 10 years				Escoteiro/Escoteira; 11 to 14 years				Sênior/Guia; 15 to 17 years			Pioneiro/Pioneira; 18 to 21 years				Chefe +21 years and older	

=== Chile ===
-	5	6	7	8	9	10	11	12	13	14	15	16	17	18	19	20	21	22	+
Asociación de Guías y Scouts de Chile
			Lobato, Golondrina; 7 to 11 years				Scout, Guía; 11 to 15 years				Pioneros; 15 to 17 years		Caminantes; 17 to 20 years						

=== Colombia ===
-	5	6	7	8	9	10	11	12	13	14	15	16	17	18	19	20	21	22	+
Asociación de Guías Scouts de Colombia
		Haditas; 6 to 9 years				Guías Menores; 10 to 12 years			Guías Caravelas; 13 to 15 years			Guías Mayores; 16 to 18 years							
Asociación Scouts de Colombia
			Lobatos; 7 to 11 years				Scouts; 11 to 16 years					Rovers; 16 to 18 years							

=== Ecuador ===
-	5	6	7	8	9	10	11	12	13	14	15	16	17	18	19	20	21	22	+
Asociación de Scouts del Ecuador
			Lobatos; 7 to 11 years					Scouts; 12 to 15 years			Caminantes; 15 to 17 years			Rovers; 18 to 25 years					
Asociación Nacional de Guías Scouts del Ecuador
			Alitas; 7 to 10 years				Juniors; 11 to 13 years			Cadetes; 14 to 16 years		Guías Mayores; 16 to 18 years							

=== Guyana ===
-	5	6	7	8	9	10	11	12	13	14	15	16	17	18	19	20	21	22	+
Guyana Girl Guides Association
			Brownie Guide; 7 to 11 years							Ranger Guide; 14 to 20 years									
						Girl Guide; 10 to 16 years													

=== Paraguay ===
-	5	6	7	8	9	10	11	12	13	14	15	16	17	18	19	20	21	22	+
Asociación de Scouts del Paraguay
			Cub Scouts; 7 to 11 years				Scouts; 12 to 15 years					Rovers; 16 to 20 years							

=== Peru ===
-	5	6	7	8	9	10	11	12	13	14	15	16	17	18	19	20	21	22	+
Asociación Nacional de Guías Scouts del Perú
Giros, Girasoles; 4 to 6 years			Haditas; 7 to 10 years			Guías de la Luz; 10 to 13 years			Guías del Sol; 13 to 17 years				Guías de Servicio; 17 years and older						
Asociación de Scouts del Perú
				Lobatos; 8 to 11 years			Scouts; 11 to 14 years			Caminantes; 14 to 17 years				Rovers; 18 to 21 years					
Asociación Peruana de Escultismo
				Lobatos, Aspirantes; 8 to 11 years				Scout; 12 to 16/17 years					Rover Scouts; 17 years and older						
Exploradores Peruanos
pequeños exploradores up to 8 years				niños exploradores 8 to 11 years			muchachos exploradores 11 to 17 years						jovenes exploradores 17 to 21 years				exploradores mayores 21 years and older		

=== Suriname ===
-	5	6	7	8	9	10	11	12	13	14	15	16	17	18	19	20	21	22	+
Boy Scouts van Suriname
		Cub Scouts; 6 to 12 years						Scouts; 12 to 18 years						Rover Scouts; 18 to 24 years					

=== Uruguay ===
-	5	6	7	8	9	10	11	12	13	14	15	16	17	18	19	20	21	22	+
Asociación Guías Scout del Uruguay
	Cometas - Etapa Solar; 5 to 7 years			Cometas - Etapa Lunar; 8 to 10 years		Guías; 10 to 13 years			Guías Mayores - Etapa Pre-Fuego; 13 to 15 years			Guías Mayores - Etapa Fuego; 16 to 18 years							
Movimiento Scout del Uruguay
				Lobatos; 8 to 10 years			Scouts; 11 to 13 years			Pioneros; 14 to 16 years			Rovers; 17 to 19 years						

=== Venezuela ===
-	5	6	7	8	9	10	11	12	13	14	15	16	17	18	19	20	21	22	+
Asociación de Guías Scouts de Venezuela
Margaritas; 4 to 5 years		Haditas; 6 to 10 years								Guías Mayores; 14 to 18 years									
						Guías Menores; 10 to 15 years													
Asociación de Scouts de Venezuela
		Lobatos, Lobeznas; 6 to 11 years					Scouts; 11 to 16 years					Rovers; 16 to 21 years							

== See also ==
- Scouting
- World Association of Girl Guides and Girl Scouts
- World Organization of the Scout Movement
- List of highest awards in Scouting
