= World Organization of Independent Scouts =

International scouting organization

- Country: Worldwide
- Founded: 2010
- Membership: 19400
- President: Hugo Paniagua
- Website www.woisscouts.com

The World Organization of Independent Scouts is an international Scouting organization for traditional Scouting.

== Members ==
=== Full Members ===
- Brazil: Federação dos Escoteiros tradicionais
- Chile: Federación Nacional de Boy Scouts y Girl Guides de Chile
- Colombia: Asociación Colombiana de Scouts Independientes
- Ecuador: Asociación Ecuatoriana de Scouts
- Paraguay: Baden Powell Scouts Paraguay
- Turkey: Federation of Scouts Union of Thrace
- Uruguay: Scouts del Uruguay
- Venezuela: Associación Civil Scouts Independientes de Venezuela

=== Prospect members ===
- Armenia: Scouts Armenios Chiraks
- Cyprus: Cyprus Turkish Scouts Volunteers Association
- Ghana: Ghana Peace Scouts
- Haiti: Scout Anglican d'Haiti
- India: Scouts / Guides India
- Ivory Coast: Eclaireurs Neutres de Côte d'Ivoire
- Kosovo: Scouts of Kosovo
- Liberia: Deaf Scout Association of Liberia
- Mexico: Hermandad Scout Independientes de México
- Mexico: Exploradores México Nuevo Rumbo, Asociación Civi I
- Peru: Master Scout del Peru
- Peru: Asociación Nacional Scouts Independientes de Peru
- Portugal: Escoteiros Indepenientes de Portugal
- Spain: Scout Independientes de España
- United Kingdom: Britain's Independent Scout Organisation

=== Former members ===
- Argentina: Asociación Scouts y Guías de la República Argentina
- Argentina: Unión Argentina de Scouts Independientes
- Argentina: Institucion Argentina de Scoutismo Adulto
- Argentina: Scouts Navales de Argentina
- Argentina: Asociación Nacional Civil de Scouts Independientes Argentina- ANCASI
- Brazil: Associação de Escoteiros do Mar do Distrito Federal
- Chile: Agrupación de Guías y Scouts Cristianos de Chile
- Chile: Scouts Tradicionales Chillán - Ñuble
- Colombia: Asociación Colombiana de Scout Independientes
- Colombia: Organización Scouts Independientes de Colombia
- Colombia: Corporación de Scouts Tradicionales Colombia
- Guinea-Bissau: Federacao Dos Escoteiros Tradicionais - FET
- India: Peace Scouts and Guides India
- India: Venture Youth Movement of Scouts
- Italy: Associazione Scautistica Cattolica Italiana
- Mexico: Asociación de Grupos Scouts de México
- Mexico: Asociacion Nacional Escultista Caballeros Y Guias Aztecas A.C.
- Nepal: Nepal Peace Scouts (Nepal Shanti Scouts)
- Paraguay: Asociación Scout Baden Powell del Paraguay
- Paraguay: Unión de Scouts Navales y Aeronavales del Paraguay
- Peru: Scouts Tradicionales Peru

== Emblem ==
The membership badge for youth is a white Fleur-de-lis with two azure five-point stars on an azure background. The membership badge for adults is an azure Fleur-de-lis on a white background.

== History ==
The World Organization of Independent Scouts was founded in 2010 by former members of the World Federation of Independent Scouts. The organization started with around 15,000 members.
