= Scouting and Guiding in El Salvador =

Scouting and Guiding movement in El Salvador

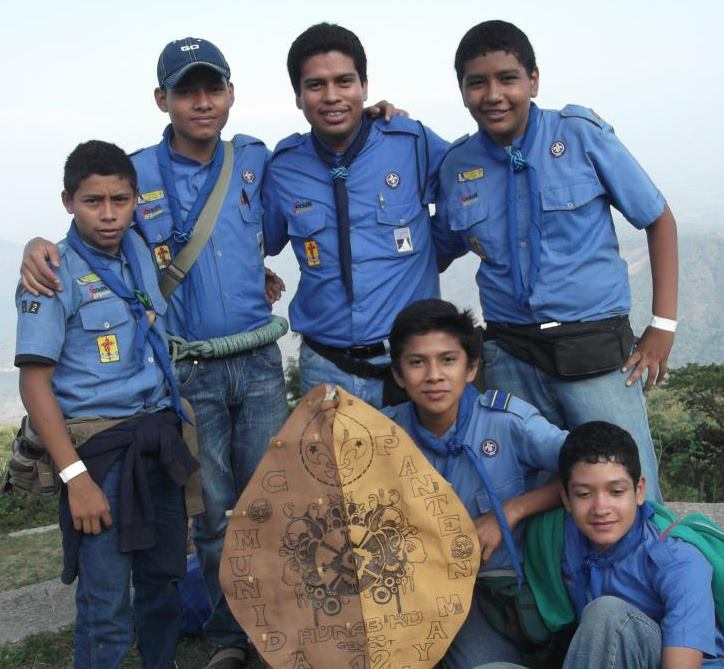
- First participation abroad by the Mayan Pantheon Scout Group

Scouting and Guiding in El Salvador is served by two groups. Founded in 1944, the Girl Guide Association of El Salvador became an associate member of the World Association of Girl Guides and Girl Scouts in 1949 and a full member in 1960. The Asociación de Scouts de El Salvador was founded in 1938 and became a member of the World Organization of the Scout Movement in 1940.

== Background ==
The Scout and Guide movement in El Salvador is served by

- Asociación de Muchachas Guías de El Salvador, member of the World Association of Girl Guides and Girl Scouts
- Asociación de Scouts de El Salvador, member of the World Organization of the Scout Movement
