= Scouting and Guiding in Chad =

Scouting and Guiding associations in Chad

The Scout and Guide movement in Chad is served by two organisations

- Association des Guides du Tchad, member of the World Association of Girl Guides and Girl Scouts
- Fédération du Scoutisme Tchadien, member of the World Organization of the Scout Movement
