= Scouts de Uruguay =

Scouting organization in Uruguay

- Scouts of Uruguay
- Country: Uruguay
- Founded: 2000
- Membership: 900
- Website www.scouts.org.uy

The Scouts de Uruguay (SDU, Scouts of Uruguay) is one of Uruguay's Scouting organizations. It seceded from the Movimiento Scout del Uruguay in 2000 and serves about 900 members.

The Scout emblem of the Scouts de Uruguay incorporates elements of the coat of arms of Uruguay as well as the flag of Uruguay.

== See also ==
- Scouting in Uruguay
