= Rover Scouts (Baden-Powell Scouts' Association) =

Section for adults 18+

- Owner: Baden-Powell Scouts' Association
- Age range: 18+
- Country: United Kingdom
Previous; Senior Scouts	

Rover Scouts or Rovers is the final section of the Baden-Powell Scouts' Association for adults aged 18 and over. There is no upper age limit for Rover Scouts and all genders are admitted. The aim of the section is "to facilitate the growth of young adults". Rover Scouts are guided to train themselves, in body, mind and spirit, to become responsible members of their community.

The Rover Scout section follows on from the Senior Scout section.

== History ==
The section was started in 1918, following the successful growth of the Scout Movement, and was intended to provide a Scouting programme for young men who had grown up beyond the age range of the core Scout section. It was quickly adopted by the national Scouting organisations around the world.

== Programme ==
Before being invested as a Rover Scout, a period of time is spent as a Rover Squire. This allows the Rover to consider what they intend to achieve as a Rover Scout and how they intend to accomplish these goals.

=== Promise ===
The Rover Scout section uses the same Promise as other Scout sections of the Baden-Powell Scouts' Association.

=== Motto ===
The Rover motto, reflecting the purpose of the section, is "Service".

=== Uniform ===
The Rover Scout uniform is the same as other Scout Sections, although a green beret and shoulder tabs are worn.

== Awards ==
The Rover Scout awards include the Scoutcraft Star (awarded for proving Scouting knowledge), Service Training Star (awarded for providing a service to the local community), Rambler's Badge (awarded for undertaking an expedition), Project Badge (awarded for completing a project of the Rover Scout's design) and the Rover Instructor Badge (awarded for reaching a high level of Instruction in a particular field within the Rover's Scout Group).

The top award in the section is the Baden-Powell Award.

Rover Scouts are also encouraged to continue working towards their Duke of Edinburgh's Award until they are 25 years old, with much of the Rover Scout training and service meeting the requirements of this Award.

== See also ==
- The Baden-Powell Scouts' Association
- Age Groups in Scouting and Guiding
