= Scouting and Guiding in Paraguay =

Scouting and Guiding associations in Paraguay

The Scout and Guide movement in Paraguay is served by:

- Asociación Guías Scouts del Paraguay, member of the World Association of Girl Guides and Girl Scouts
- Asociación de Scouts del Paraguay, member of the World Organization of the Scout Movement
- Unión Scout Independiente de Paraguay, member of the Unión Scout Tradicional de América
- Asociación Scout Baden Powell del Paraguay, member of the World Federation of Independent Scouts
- Federación Paraguaya de Escultismo, member of the Confederación interamericana de Scouts independientes
- Agrupación Nacional de Boy Scout del Paraguay
