= Scouting and Guiding in Ghana =

Associations in Ghana

The Scout and Guide movement in Ghana is served by:

- The Ghana Girl Guides Association, member of the World Association of Girl Guides and Girl Scouts
- The Ghana Scout Association, member of the World Organization of the Scout Movement
- The Baden-Powell Scouts' Association, member of the World Federation of Independent Scouts

== International Scouting units in Ghana ==
In addition, there are American Boy Scouts in Accra, linked to the Direct Service branch of the Boy Scouts of America, which supports units around the world.
