= Beavers (Scouting) =

Programmes for children

Beavers are programmes associated with some Scout organisations, imitating some aspects of Scouts but for young children aged 5/6 to 7/8 who are too young to be Scouts and make the Scout Promise.

Beavers programmes had their origins 1963 and, since then, some scout organisations have developed Beavers or similar programmes by other names, often using an animal local to their region instead. However, many Scout organisations, such as some Traditional Scouting organisations, have never adopted programmes for younger children at all, typically on the grounds that this was not one of Robert Baden-Powell's original programmes and his warnings against too close identification with juvenile programmes.

Beavers and similar programmes usually involve:

- A pledge and/or motto,
- Earning merit badges
- A uniform, distinct from that of programmes for older children and youths
- Organised in groups, e.g. a Beaver "Colony", with optional sub-groups e.g. "Lodges"
- Special ceremonies to commemorate new members and the graduation of members into programmes for older children
- Symbols unique to the programme, such as sitting and standing formations, salutes, and handshakes
- Use of lore and nicknames e.g. in Beavers, that sourced from Harry McCartney's 1971 short story Friends of the Forest.

== History ==
In 1963, The Little Brothers, a programme for boys who were too young to be Wolf Cubs was set up in Northern Ireland by the 1st Dromore Scout Group. It spread to Belfast with seven groups two years later. The creation of a programme for children aged under eight was sparked by the launch of other younger sections in other youth organisations at the time, including the Anchors section of the Boys' Brigade, which some feared was partly causing a drop in numbers of Cubs experienced at the time. As the scheme expanded throughout the rest of the province, it was given the name of Beavers in 1966, having been a name considered by Robert Baden-Powell when The Boy Scouts Association created its Wolf Cubs.

A Canadian Beaver programme was designed and tested in Winnipeg, Manitoba in 1971 by Harry McCartney, Alan Jones, and Gordon Hanna. and in 1972 it was expanded across the Scouts Canada organisation. It was formally made a programme of Scouts Canada in 1974.

This was followed by the Republic of Ireland in the same year. Beaver formally became a programme of the Scout Association of the United Kingdom in 1986. Beavers and programmes for similar ages spread to a few other Scout organisations around the world by the late 1980s.

== Beaver and similar programmes around the world ==
=== Australia ===
==== Baden-Powell Scouts' Association in Australia ====
The Baden-Powell Scouts' Association in Australia has a programme called Koalas, although some Groups do not operate Koalas as they were not part of Baden-Powell's concept. The programme serves 5 to 8-year-olds and is followed by Wolf Cubs. The Koalas programme uses a catchphrase and themes around "Koalas climb high" with participants reciting the phrase and mimicking the motions of a climbing Koala.

==== Scouts Australia ====
Scouts Australia has a programme called Joeys for 5 to 7-year-olds. A joey is an infant kangaroo. The Joeys' programme uses a catchphrase and themes around "Hop, Hop, Hop" such as Help Other People with participants reciting the phrase and mimicking the motions of a hopping joey kangaroo.

=== Canada ===
==== Scouts Canada ====
A Beavers programme for Scouts Canada was designed and tested in 1971 and adopted in 1974. Within Scouts Canada, Beavers are aged five to seven. Members normally wear a brown vest as a uniform with a brown Beaver coby hat.

The Scouts Canada Beavers programme is based on the specially written short story Friends of the Forest written by Harry McCartney. McCartney was the Manitoba Executive Scout Director in 1971. With the help of two others, Alan Jones, and Gordon Hanna, the Beavers programme was tested and successfully formally spread country-wide, by 1974.

A five-year-old Beaver is a brown tail, a six-year-old is a blue tail and a seven-year-old is a white tail. The tail is attached to the back brim of the Beaver Hat on a Beaver's uniform.

Beavers, at the end of their third (white tail) year, participate in a "swim-up" ceremony to become Cubs.

==== Association des Scouts du Canada ====
In the Association des Scouts du Canada Castors (Beavers in French) are aged from seven to nine. Members normally wear a yellow T-shirt and tan or brown pants. The programme is based on a specially written story called Les aventures de Cartouche et Namor (The Adventures of Cartouche and Namor).

Castor Promise: Je m'engage à faire des efforts pour jouer avec et comme les autres. (I promise to do my best to play with and like others)

Castor Motto: Effort (Effort)

The new Beaver receives his neckerchief and uniform at a promise ceremony where the Beaver, generally, must demonstrate that he has joined the unit. From that moment, the new Beavers have entered the Beaver programme.

Beavers collect individual badges following a four-step programme:

- Source (spring) which is for objective integration
- Ruisseau (stream) which is for objective participation
- Cascades (waterfall) which is for objective initiative
- Étang (pond) which is for objective sharing

They can also collect two technique badges which are called buchettes (splint): Security and Environnement.

When they climb to Cubs, they receive a badge called "Castor découvreur" (discovering beaver).

==== Baden-Powell Service Association ====
In the Baden-Powell Service Association in Canada, the corresponding section for this age group is called Otters.

=== Japan ===
Beaver Scouts (Japanese: ビーバースカウト) started in Japan in 1986. Like all of the Scout Association of Japan units, Beavers have been coed since 1995. Beavers are the youngest age group in Scouting Japan, a 2-year programme that covers 1st and 2nd grades.

=== Mexico ===
In Asociación de Scouts de México, A.C. there was a Beaver Section, but it has been closed down. However, there are many beaver groups or "castores" in Spanish working informally in parallel.

=== New Zealand ===
Scouts New Zealand has a programme called Keas for this age group. Kea is a New Zealand parrot.

=== South Africa ===
In 2019, Scouts South Africa launched a Meerkats programme initially started by Sherley Southworth, and formally recognised under Chief Scout Dr. Brendon Hausberger, for children aged 5 and 6. The motto "Stand Tall" is based on the upright posture of a meerkat standing guard near its burrow.

=== Switzerland ===
Various troops in Switzerland also have Beavers (in some Cantons also called Fünkli, Füchse or Murmeli) but they are not formally recognised by the Swiss Guide and Scout Movement.

They usually only wear the troop's neckerchief but have no uniform.

=== United Kingdom ===
==== The Scout Association ====
The Scout Association formally recognised Beavers in 1986, but there had been a fully-fledged Beaver section in Northern Ireland since 1966, plus informal colonies in other parts of the UK for many years before 1986. The programme is run for 5¾ to 8-year-olds and precedes Cubs.

The Beavers section currently makes up the largest proportion of participants within The Scout Association in the United Kingdom, with many colonies having waiting lists, some of which may have several times as many waiting as there are actual members.

The uniform is a turquoise sweatshirt or T-shirt, with the group colours for the neckerchief. The motto, shared with the rest of the UK Scout Association sections, is "Be Prepared".

==== Baden-Powell Scouts' Association ====
The Baden-Powell Scouts' Association recognised Beavers in 1982, although some Groups do not operate Beaver colonies as they were not part of Baden-Powell's concept. The programme serves 5 to 8-year-olds and is followed by Wolf Cubs.

The uniform is a vest that can be of many colours, with the group colours for the neckerchief. Some groups also issue Beavers with caps.

=== United States ===
==== Boy Scouts of America ====
The Boy Scouts of America (BSA) never organized a multi-year Beavers programme separate from Cubs. Instead, over time, their Cub programme has expanded to fill this age group. While the modern incarnation of Cubs in the United States contains programmes for grades K through 5, the path to this structure was evolutionary.

As of 1981, the earliest program available in Cubs was the Wolf Scout programme, intended for boys 8 years of age. In the fall of 1982, BSA introduced the Tiger Cubs programme for 7-year-olds, as a programme distinct from the Cubs. When BSA participation was changed to grade-based instead of age-based in 1986, Tiger Cubs became the 1st-grade programme, effectively changing the eligible age of most Tiger Cubs boys to 6. Tiger Cubs were opened to Cub Packs in 1993, and Tiger Dens were introduced in 1995. By 2001, Tigers (as they are now called) were fully integrated into Cubs and had their merit badge.

In 2016 a pilot programme began for Kindergarten (age 5-6) boys with a new rank, Lion. Lions became a permanent rank inside Cubs in 2018. Also in 2018, as part of the larger structural change of allowing girls into all Cub programmes, girl dens at all ranks, including Lion and Tiger, were allowed.

==== Baden-Powell Service Association ====
In the Baden-Powell Service Association, the corresponding section for this age group is called Otters.

== See also ==
- Age groups in Scouting and Guiding
