= Scouting and Guiding in Ecuador =

Scouting and Guiding associations in Ecuador

The Scout and Guide movement in Ecuador is served by

- Asociación Nacional de Guías Scouts del Ecuador, member of the World Association of Girl Guides and Girl Scouts
- Asociación de Scouts del Ecuador, member of the World Organization of the Scout Movement
- Federación Ecuatoriana de Scouts Independientes, prospect member of the World Federation of Independent Scouts
