= Beaver Scouts (Baden-Powell Scouts' Association) =

- Badge issued to celebrate 30 years of Beaver Scouting in the B-PSA
- Owner: Baden-Powell Scouts' Association
- Age range: 6–8
- Country: United Kingdom
	Next; Wolf Cubs

Beaver Scouts, usually referred to as Beavers, is the youngest section of Scouting operated by the Baden-Powell Scouts' Association. The core age range for Beaver Scouts is six to eight years, though exceptions can be granted. Individual sections of Beaver Scouts, known as a Colony, are run by the local Scout Group. After reaching the age of eight, a Beaver Scout will then move on to Wolf Cubs.

== History ==
Originating in Canada in 1973, Beaver Scouts have been a section of the Baden-Powell Scouts' Association since 1982 as a response to other Youth Organisations, such as the Boys' Brigade opening their doors to younger children.

== Organisation ==
A Beaver Colony is a section of the Scout Group aimed at children from 6 to 8 years. The Scout Leader in charge of the Colony will be a Beaver Scout Leader, assisted by Assistant Beaver Scout Leader and Section Assistants.

Beaver Scout Colonies are controlled by the local Scout Group, with each colony being divided into a number of Lodges. The Beaver in charge of a Lodge is known as a 'Lodge Leader', who is assisted by an 'Assistant Lodge Leader'. This is a similar role to that of Senior Sixer in the Wolf Cub pack.

== Programme ==
=== UK Promise ===
The Beaver Scout promise is a simpler version of the Scout Promise:

I promise to do my best,
To be kind and helpful
and to love God.

=== UK Motto ===
The Beaver Scouts motto is "Busy and Bright".

=== UK Beaver Prayer ===
Dear Lord, help me to be a good Beaver,
always busy and bright.
Be with those so dear to me
and help me do things right. Amen.

=== UK Uniform ===
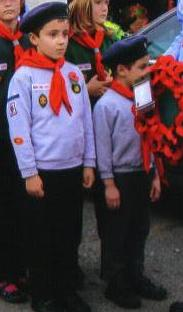
B-PSA Beaver Scouts at a Remembrance Parade, November 2011

The Beaver Scout uniform is a turquoise and with a group scarf (neckerchief) with black or grey shorts, trousers or skirts and black shoes

=== International Variations ===
International sections of the Baden-Powell Scouts' Association have variations on the above, an example of which being B-PSA Ireland's Beaver Promise of, "I promise to love God and to Help take care of the World."

== Awards and Badges ==
Beaver Scouts can earn a number of awards and badges.

== See also ==
- Beavers (Scouting)
- Age groups in Scouting and Guiding
