= Scouts (Baden-Powell Scouts' Association) =

- Owner: Baden-Powell Scouts' Association
- Age range: 10–15
- Country: United Kingdom
Previous; Wolf Cubs	Next; Senior Scouts

As with Scouts in The Scout Association, the Scout section of the BPSA is the direct descendant of the original Scout Patrols which formed in the United Kingdom in 1908. The section is open to both boys and girls between the ages of 10–15 years, and are now formed into local Scout Troops.

Scout Troops form part of a Scout Group. The Scout section follows on from the Wolf Cub Pack (8-10 year olds) and Scouts move onto the Senior Scout section at the age of 15.

A general Scouting programme is adopted by Scout Troops, but it is possible for specialist troops to be formed. Sea Scouts and Air Scouts are example of specialist programme troops.

== Organisation ==
The Scout Troop forms the core section of most Scout Groups. The Troop is the longest running section within the organisation, although it was originally termed the Scout Patrol when the movement started in 1907.

Most Groups will have one Troop, while some others may, rarely, be able to support two more, depending on the numbers of Scouts and adult leaders within the Group.

Scout Troops have an adult leadership team consisting of a warranted Scout Master and one or two Assistant Scout Masters. They can also be supported by adult helpers and Senior or Rover Scout Instructors.

The Scouts within the Troop are divided into Patrols, ideally of 6-8 members, with a Patrol Leader and an Assistant Patrol Leader. The Patrol Leader is appointed by the adult leaders, with the Assistant Patrol Leader being chosen by the Patrol Leader. Some Troops may also hold a position for a Senior Patrol Leader.

Within the Troop, the Patrol Leaders hold a regular council and are able to plan and run activities and deal with matters of discipline under the guidance of the Scout Master.

== Training Scheme ==
The B-P Scouts follow a development of the original Training Scheme laid down by Baden-Powell:

- Tenderfoot

Basic knowledge of Scouting, the Law and promise and Scouting skills.

- Second Class

Before qualifying for the Second Class, a Scout is required to have completed three months service with the Scouts, leading to more detailed understanding of Scouting, and to have developed skills including basic First Aid, healthy living, backwoods skills, The Highway Code and completion of a 13km journey on foot.

- First Class

This award includes having completed ten nights camping as a Scout, being proficient in First Aid, tracking and estimating, be able to use and maintain equipment, camp in a bivvy, prepare food with and without a camping stove, and have undertaken a 24-hour 25km journey.

- Scout Cord

To qualify for The Scout Cord a Scout must complete the First Class Award, hold the Citizenship Badge and three proficiency badges from Backwoodsman, Camper, Camp Cook, Explorer, Pioneer, Tracker, Starman, Weatherman or Woodcraftsman.

=== Proficiency Awards ===
The Scouts are also able to complete a range of proficiency awards. All Scouting activities are properly supervised by qualified instructors for that activity.

== See also ==
- Boy Scout - international overview
- Age Groups in Scouting and Guiding
