= Senior Scouts (Baden-Powell Scouts' Association) =

- Owner: Baden-Powell Scouts' Association
- Age range: 14–18
- Country: United Kingdom
Previous; Scouts; Sea Scouts; Air Scouts	Next; Rover Scouts

Senior Scouts or Seniors is a section of the Baden-Powell Scouts' Association for 14- to 18-year-olds. The aim of the section is to provide a flexible and active Scouting programme for adolescents, with an emphasis on personal challenge and adventure. Members of this section wear maroon berets and shoulder tabs.

The Senior Scout section follows on from the Scout section, and is in turn followed by Rover Scouts.

== History ==
The Senior Scout section was first suggested by Baden-Powell in 1917, but it was soon replaced by Rover Scouts, before being restored as a section in the Boy Scouts Association in 1946. In 1967, The Scout Association's Advance Party Report replaced Rover Scouts and Senior Scouts with the Venture Scout section. This was one of the factors that led to the formation of the Baden-Powell Scouts' Association.

== Programme ==
=== Promise ===
The Senior Scout section uses the same Promise as other Scout sections of the Baden-Powell Scouts' Association.

=== Motto ===
The motto of the Senior Scout section is Look Wide.

=== Uniform ===
The Senior Scout uniform is the same as other Scout Sections, although a maroon beret and shoulder tabs are worn.

== Awards ==
The Senior Scout awards include the Bushman's Thong, a leather braid made by the Scout and worn on their uniform, and top-level awards such as the St. George's Award. There are also a number of activity and skill badges which can be awarded to the young people upon meeting requirements in a variety of disciplines from horse-riding to first aid.

== See also ==
- Age groups in Scouting and Guiding
