= Scouting and Guiding in Turkey =

The Scout and Guide movement in Turkey is served by

- Scouting and Guiding Federation of Turkey, member of the World Organization of the Scout Movement and the World Association of Girl Guides and Girl Scouts
- Federation of Scout Union of Thrace (Trakya İzciler Birliği Federasyonu), member of the World Organization of Independent Scouts
