= St. George's Scout =

St. George's Award
- Owner: Baden-Powell Scouts' Association

The St. George's Award is the highest youth award achievable in the Senior Scouts section of the Baden-Powell Scouts' Association.

The St. George's Award, like the Queen's Scout Award, is conferred on the recipient; you are not awarded the St. George's Award, you become a St. George's Scout. The Award is named for St. George, the patron saint of Scouting, and marks the completion of many requirements met during their time in the Baden-Powell Scouts' Association. The St. George's Award needs to be completed before the Senior Scout's 18th birthday.

== Requirements ==
The St. George's Award is the culmination of the B-PSA Scout training scheme. In order to become a St. George's Scout, the young person is required to have completed several prior awards, including:

- Venturer Badge

The Senior Scout is required to:
1 Complete an adventure journey as a member of a Patrol in which they play a leading part. The journey, which may be short in length, must include at least 5 'incidents' such as rescues from fire or heights, compass work, or signalling over distance.
2 Be reasonably proficient in 2 of the following. Each of the 2 must be selected from different groups, as under:

(A) Boxing, Fencing, Wrestling, Judo.
(B) Rowing, Riding, ice-skating, sailing, gliding.
(C) Swimming, Diving.
(D) Gymnastics, Tumbling.
(E) Rock climbing, Rope Spinning, Caving.
(F) Athletics, Field events, Cross country events.
(G) Rifle Shooting, Archery.

3 Be able to perform 2 of the following:

(A) Climb a tree to a height of 9m.
(B) Vault a fence two-thirds of your height.
(C) Swim 20m wearing clothes.

4 Make a journey of at least 32 km. on foot, with not more than 2 other Senior Scouts. Route must be one with which the Senior Scout is not familiar and should, if possible, include stiff country. Sleep out, using only the gear carried in a rucksack. Maximum weights 14 kg (which must include food). The Examiner may set the candidate 1 or 2 tasks that require a specific report and a general log of the journey is required.

- Bushman's Thong

The Senior Scout is required to hold the Bushman's Thong, or Braid, which is a plaited leather braid worn on the right breast. In order to gain the Bushman's Thong the Senior Scout is required to have reached First Class Scout and have completed the Venturer Badge (above) and two proficiency badges from either Astronomer, Camp Warden, Forester, Hiker, Master Cook, Meteorologist, Naturalist, Senior Pioneer, or Survival. They are also expected to have camped for 30 nights as a member of their group. The final part of the Award involves the Scout making their own leather braid.

- Ambulance Badge

The standards for this award follow current St. John's literature. The examiner for this badge must be a qualified doctor, RGN, SRN or an Instructor in First Aid to one of the bodies listed above or have passed a B-PSA course in the aspects of First Aid.

- Public Service

The Senior Scout is required to complete three public service badges, chosen from Conservation, Crime Watch, Dispatch Rider, Fireman, Handyman, Interpreter, Leading Signaller, Pathfinder, Pilot, Public Health, Quartermaster, Rescuer, Senior Explorer, or Camp Warden. An alternative is for the applicant to hold the Senior Scout Instructor badge.

- Camping

The Senior Scout is required to have camped for 40 nights as part of the Group.

- Interview

Complete an interview with the Commissioner for Senior Scouts, in which they are required to show that they have been providing an example of "the Scout Way of Life".
