= Fédération Gabonaise du Scoutisme =

National Scouting federation of Gabon

- Scout Federation of Gabon
- Country: Gabon
- Founded: 1936
- Membership: 3,809
- Affiliation: World Organization of the Scout Movement

The Fédération Gabonaise du Scoutisme, the national federation of several Scouting organizations of Gabon, was founded under French Equatorial Africa in 1936, although Scouting appeared years before brought by colonists, and became a member of the World Organization of the Scout Movement in 1971. The coeducational Fédération Gabonaise du Scoutisme has 3,809 members as of 2008.

There are three Scout Associations that make up the Scout Federation. They are Scouts et Guides Catholiques du Gabon (Catholic Scouts and Guides of Gabon), Eclaireuses-Eclaireurs du Gabon (Scouts and Guides of Gabon) and Eclaireurs et Eclaireuses Unionistes du Gabon (Protestant Scouts and Guides of Gabon).

Scouting in Gabon is involved in public service in cooperation with sports and cultural organizations. Tree planting campaigns have been carried out as well as projects to improve some public areas.

== Program sections ==
- Cub Scouts - ages 7 to 11
- Scouts - ages 12 to 15
- Rover Scouts - ages 16 to 20

The Scout Motto is Toujours Prêt, Always Ready in French.
