= Organisation of Bulgarian Scouts =

National Scouting organization of Bulgaria

- Организация на българските скаути
- Country: Bulgaria
- Founded: 1995
- Membership: 373
- Affiliation: World Organization of the Scout Movement
- Website http://www.scout.bg/

The Organisation of Bulgarian Scouts (Bulgarian Организация на българските скаути, Organizatsia na Bulgarskite Skauti), the primary national Scouting organization of Bulgaria, became a member of the World Organization of the Scout Movement in 1999; work towards World Association of Girl Guides and Girl Scouts membership recognition remains unclear. The coeducational Organisation of Bulgarian Scouts had 2,109 members as of 2011, 304 members as of 2021, and 373 members as of 2023.

== History ==
The Organization of Bulgarian Young Scouts (Организацията на българските младежи разузнавачи - ОБМР) was founded in 1923 from three first scouts in Varna, Sofia and Samokov. In the second half of 1924, ОБМР was recognized and admitted as a member of the World Bureau of Boy Scouts, based in London. In 1940, with a brief letter to the International Scout Office in London, the leaders of the ОБМР reported on their self-dissolution, forced by the Ministry of War, General Hristo Lukov.

Scouting was outlawed after the war as well, when communists controlled Bulgaria.

=== Rebirth ===
Scouting resumed in 1989 when the Berlin Wall was taken down, but it did not meet WOSM requirements for membership until 1995. The negative legacy of the Communist youth organizations contributed to slow growth of the Scouting movement, as it left the Scouts ill-equipped and without experienced leadership or established programs.

The Organisation of Bulgarian Scouts was accepted into the World Organization of the Scout Movement on January 17, 1999 as its 151st member and given an official welcome to WOSM at the World Scout Conference in South Africa on July 25, 1999. In 2011 there were 57 Scout groups spread through Bulgaria, including in 20 of the largest cities and towns, with a membership of approximately 2,000. Sea Scouts were present in the city of Silistra, located on the Danube River, and on the Black Sea. In 2025 there are 19 scout groups in 12 Bulgarian cities and towns, with membership of 373. The organization is volunteer-run. The Organisation of Bulgarian Scouts is open to both males and females. Bulgarian Scouts are well-publicized in their country and active in community development, including participating in projects related to reforestation and the Bulgarian Red Cross. They have an annual national Jamboree.

The Bulgarian noun for a single Scout is Скаут.

== Program ==
- Cubs are 7 to 11 years of age
- Scouts are 11 to 15
- Ventures are 15 to 18
- Rovers are 18 to 26

== Ideals ==
=== Motto ===
Scouts—"Be Prepared"

Sea Scouts—"Love the Sea"

=== Scout Oath ===
Pred chestta si obeshtavam, che shte se staraja spored silite si:
da ispulnjavam dulga si kum Boga I otechestvoto, da pomagam vinagi na drugite, da spasvam sakona na Skauta.
I give my word of honor, that I will do my best:
to do my duty to God and to the fatherland, to help others at all times and to obey the Scout Law.

=== Scout Law ===
Scautut e chesten I dostoen sa doverie
Scautut e predan na Boga, Otechestvoto, obshtestvoto i semejstvoto si
Scautut e dluzen da bude polesen i da pomaga na drugite
Scautut e prijatel na vsichki i brat na vseki drug Scout
Scautut e vezliv i etichen
Scautut e prijatel na zivotnite i opasva okolnata sreda
Scautut projavjava chustvo na uvagenie
Scautut e vesel i sas visok duh
Scautut e pesteliv i opazva chastnata i obshtestvena sobstvenost
Scautut e chist vav mislitr, dumit i delata si
A Scout is honest and trustworthy
A Scout is loyal to God, the fatherland, society and his family
A Scout's duty is to be useful and to help others
A Scout is a friend to all and brother to every other Scout
A Scout is courteous
A Scout is kind to animals and protects the environment
A Scout is respectful and obedient
A Scout is cheerful and has spirit
A Scout is thrifty and respects all property
A Scout is clean in thought, word and deed

== Emblem ==
The membership badge of Organisation of Bulgarian Scouts incorporates the Cyrillic letters О-Б-С (O-B-S).

== National Scout camps ==
Year	Name	Place	Dates
1998	Drastar	Silistra	
1999		Koprivshtitsa	
2000	Sredets	Sofia	
2001	Dunav	Silistra	
2001		Sofia	
2002	Kamchiya		
2003	Odesos		
2004	Orlovo Gnezdo	Zemen	
2005	Asenevtci	Asenovgrad	
2006	Antola	Popovo	
2007	Struma	Zemen	05-15.08.2007
2008	Vetren	Silistra	03-12.08.2008
2009	Sekvoya	Popovo	01-11.08.2009
2010	Shumen - Sarceto na Bulgaria	Shumen	13-22.08.2010
2011	Shumen - 100 godini skautstvo v Bulgaria	Shumen	14-22.08.2011
2012	Kaylaka	Pleven	01-10.08.2012
2014		Shumen	07-16.08.2014
2017	Indiana Jones	Shumen	15-19.07.2017
2024	Planinata na Orfei	Smolyan	
