= Association des Scouts et Guides de Mauritanie =

National Scouting organization of Mauritania

- Scout and Guide Association of Mauritania
- Country: Mauritania
- Founded: 1936
- Membership: 4,200
- Affiliation: World Association of Girl Guides and Girl Scouts, World Organization of the Scout Movement

The Association des Scouts et Guides de Mauritanie (Arabic: جمعية الكشافة والمرشدات الموريتانية), the national Scouting organization of Mauritania, was founded in 1936, became a member of the World Organization of the Scout Movement in 1983, and is also an associate member of the World Association of Girl Guides and Girl Scouts. The coeducational Association des Scouts et Guides de Mauritanie has about 4,200 members (3,790 Scouts and 456 Guides) as of 2008.

The program stresses the physical, intellectual, moral and civic formation of youth ages 7 to 30 under Islamic principles.

There is an emphasis on bringing Scouting to boys in rural areas. Scouts are involved in tree planting projects to help stop the desert from spreading.

== Program and sections ==
- Louveteaux/Cubs-ages 6 to 12
- Eclaireurs/Scouts-ages 13 to 17
- Routiers/Rovers-ages 18 to 30

The Scout Motto is Kun Musta'iddan or كن مستعداً, Be Prepared in Arabic and Sois Prêt, Be Prepared in French. The noun for a single Scout is Kashaf or كشاف in Arabic.
