= Wolf Cubs (Baden-Powell Scouts' Association) =

- Owner: Baden-Powell Scouts' Association
- Age range: 8–10.5
- Country: United Kingdom
Previous; Beavers	Next; Scouts

Wolf Cubs, usually referred to as Cubs, is the 3rd youngest section of Scouting operated by the Baden-Powell Scouts' Association, following on from the Beaver Scouts section. The core age range for Wolf Cubs is eight to eleven, though exceptions can be granted. Individual sections of Wolf Cubs, known as a Pack, are run by the local Scout Group. After reaching the age of ten and a half, a Wolf Cub may move on to Scouts.

== History ==
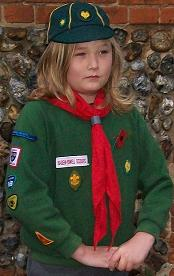
A member of the B-PSA Wolf Cub section.

Wolf Cubs were established by Robert Baden-Powell in 1916, as a response to younger boys wishing to join the Scout Movement. Baden-Powell based the new programme on the Seonnee Pack, created in "The Jungle Book" by his friend Rudyard Kipling. Wolf Cubs still use "The Jungle Book" as a basis.

== Organisation ==
A Wolf Cub Pack is a section of the Scout Group aimed at children from 8 to 11 years.

The Scout Leader in charge of the Pack will be a Cubmaster, assisted by Assistant Cubmasters and Instructors. All the warranted leaders are given names from The Jungle Book - the CM is normally given the name Akela.

Wolf Cub Packs are controlled by the local Scout Group, with each pack being divided into a number of Sixes. The Wolf Cub in charge of a six is known as a 'Sixer', who is assisted by a 'Seconder'. Where there is an outstanding Wolf Cub, in the latter stages of the Training Scheme, they may be appointed as 'Senior Sixer'. This is a similar role to that of Senior Patrol Leader in the Scout Troop. The Senior Sixer will assist the Cubmaster.

== Programme ==
=== UK promise ===
The Wolf Cub promise is a variation of the Scout promise:

"I promise to Do My Best.
To do my duty to God, and to the King,
To keep the Law of the Wolf Cub Pack,
and to do a good turn to somebody every day."

=== UK motto ===
The Wolf Cub motto is "Do Your Best."

=== UK Wolf Cub law ===
"The Cub gives in to the Old Wolf.
The Cub does not give in to himself."

=== UK uniform ===
The Wolf Cub uniform is a green jumper and group scarf (neckerchief), a cap, or beret for girls, with grey short trousers.

=== International variations ===
International sections of the Baden-Powell Scouts' Association have variations on the above, an example of which being the second line of B-PSA Ireland's Wolf Cub Promise, which is, "To do my duty, to God, and to my country,..."

== Awards and badges ==
Wolf Cubs can earn a number of awards and badges. Upon investiture, Wolf Cubs are awarded the Tenderpad, which is worn on the left breast.

=== First and Second Stars ===
The First and Second Stars are awarded on the completion of activities from four activity areas. These badges are worn on the cap, either side of the cap badge, and Wolf Cubs who have gained these awards are usually referred to as having their first and second eyes open.

=== Proficiency badges ===
There are twenty two proficiency badges that can be earned by Wolf Cubs. These are the Artist, Athlete, Book Reader, Camper, Collector, Computer, Conservation, Crime Prevention, Cyclist, Entertainer, First Aider, Friendship, Gardener, Guide, Handicraft, Hobbies, House Orderly, Observer, Scientist, Sportsman, Swimmer, Visual Communicator, and the Wolf Cub Citizenship Award.

=== Leadership stripes ===
Ranks of Wolf Cubs
Ranks	Insignia	
Ranks	Usual style	Monmouthshire style
Senior Sixer	Wolf Cub Senior Sixer	N/A
Sixer	Wolf Cub Sixer	
Seconder	Wolf Cub Seconder	

== See also ==
- Cub Scout - international overview
- Age Groups in Scouting and Guiding
