= Asociación de Guías Scouts de Colombia =

National Guiding organization of Colombia

- Girl Guide Association of Colombia
- Country: Colombia
- Founded: 1936
- Membership: 627
- Affiliation: World Association of Girl Guides and Girl Scouts
- Website guiasscoutscolombia.org

The Asociación de Guías Scouts de Colombia (AGSC, Girl Guide Association of Colombia) is the national Guiding organization of Colombia. It serves 627 members (as of 2003). Founded in 1936, the girls-only organization became a full member of the World Association of Girl Guides and Girl Scouts in 1954.

== Program ==
The organisation is divided in four branches according to age:

- Haditas - ages 6 to 9
- Guías Menores - ages 10 to 12
- Guías Caravelas - ages 13 to 15
- Guías Mayores - ages 16 to 18

=== Guide Promise ===
Con las gracias de Dios, yo ... prometo por mi honor, hacer todo cuanto de mi dependa para cumplir mis deberes para con Dios, mi Patria y mi Familia, ser útil al prójimo en todas las circunstancias y obedecer la Ley Guía.

=== Guide Law ===
1. La Guía ama la verdad y la vive.
2. La Guía es leal y digna de confianza.
3. La Guía es útil a la comunidad.
4. La Guía es amiga de todos y hermana de las demás Guias.
5. La Guía está abierta al diálogo y respeta las convicciones de los demás.
6. La Guía ama la vida y la naturaleza y al ver en ellas la obra de Dios, procura su conservación y progreso.
7. La Guía es responsible.
8. La Guía es alegre y optimista ante las dificultades.
9. La Guía cuida sus cosas y respeta las de los demas.
10. La Guía es disciplinada y consciente de lo que piensa, dice y hace.

== See also ==
- Scouting in Colombia
