= Asociación Guías Scout del Uruguay =

Scouting organization in Uruguay

- Girl Guide Association of Uruguay
- Country: Uruguay
- Founded: 1955
- Membership: 71

The Asociación Guías Scout del Uruguay (AGSU, Girl Guide Association of Uruguay) is the national Guiding organization of Uruguay. It serves 71 members (as of 2012). Founded in 1955, the coeducational organization became an associate member of the World Association of Girl Guides and Girl Scouts (WAGGGS) in 1966; the membership was revoked in 2014. This was due to the lack of a functioning organization in the country.

== History ==
The 1st Montevideo Company of British Guides was formed in 1924. Guiding in Uruguay was served by international units until 1955; these units supported the formation of the Asociación Nacionál de Guías del Uruguay that year. In 1961, a separate organization for Catholic Guides was formed. Both associations merged in 1964 under the name Asociación de Guías del Uruguay. The name was changed to Asociación Guías Scout del Uruguay in 1974.

The association became an associate member of WAGGGS in 1966. Due to problems relating to the decline in recruitment and impact of the association, the membership was subsequently revoked in 2014 after some years of suspension.

== Program ==
=== Sections ===
The association is divided in five section according to age:

- Cometas - Etapa Solar (pre-Brownies) – ages 5 to 7
- Cometas - Etapa Lunar (Brownies) – ages 8 to 10
- Guías (Girl Guides) – ages 10 to 13
- Guías Mayores - Etapa Pre-Fuego (Senior Guides) – ages 13 to 15
- Guías Mayores - Etapa Fuego (Ranger Guides) – ages 16 to 18

=== Guide Promise ===
Cometas (Brownies)

Prometo hacer todo lo que pueda para ayudar a Dios, a los de mi casa y a mi País, cumplir con la Ley del Cometa y darle cada día una alegría a alguien.

I promise to do everything I can to help God, those in my home and in my country, to obey the law of the Comet and to bring happiness to one person everyday.

Guías (Girl Guides)

Con la gracia de Dios, prometo por mi honor, hacer cuanto de mí dependa para servir a Dios y a la Patria, ayudar al prójimo en toda circunstancia y cumplir la Ley Guía.

With the grace of God, I promise on my honour to do my best to serve God and my country, to help other people in any circumstance, and to comply with the Guide Law.

=== Guide Law ===
Cometas (Brownies)

La Cometa (A comet)

1. Comparte (Shares)
2. Dice la verdad (Tells the truth)
3. Es alegre (Is happy)
4. Es trabajador (Works hard)
5. Es limpio y cuida la naturaleza (Is clean and cares for nature)
6. Es obediente (Is obedient)

Guías (Girl Guides)

1. La Guía es digna de confianza. (A Guide is worthy of trust.)
2. La Guía es leal. (A Guide is loyal.)
3. La Guía hace lo posible por ser útil y ayudar a los demás. (A Guide does everything possible to be useful and help others.)
4. La Guía es bondadosa con todos y hermana de las demás Guías. (A Guide is kind to all and a sister to all other Guides.)
5. La Guía es cortés. (A Guide is courteous.)
6. La Guía ama la naturaleza porque ve en ella la obra de Dios. (A Guide loves nature for in it she sees the work of God.)
7. La Guía sabe obedecer. (A Guide knows how to obey.)
8. La Guía es fuerte ante el sufrimiento y se sobrepone a las dificultades. (A Guide is brave, and overcomes difficulties.)
9. La Guía procura ser económica, limpia y ordenada. (A Guide tries to be thrifty, clean and tidy.)
10. La Guía es recta en su forma de pensar y actuar. (A Guide is upright in her thoughts and deeds.)

=== Guide Motto ===
Siempre lista! (Be prepared!)

== See also ==
- Scouting and Guiding in Uruguay
- Movimiento Scout del Uruguay
