= Association des Guides du Burundi =

National Guiding organization of Burundi

- Country: Burundi
- Founded: 1954
- Membership: 12,350
- Affiliation: World Association of Girl Guides and Girl Scouts

The Association des Guides du Burundi (AGB, Guide Association of Burundi) is the national Guiding organization of Burundi. As of 2018 there were 12,350 members. Founded in 1954, the girls-only organization became an associate member of the World Association of Girl Guides and Girl Scouts in 1972 and a full member in 2008.

The association participates in worldwide AIDS awareness programs.

== See also ==
- Association des Scouts du Burundi
