= Scouting and Guiding in Haiti =

Scout and Guide movement in Haiti

The Scout and Guide movement in Haiti is served by two organisations

- Association Nationale des Guides d'Haïti, member of the World Association of Girl Guides and Girl Scouts
- Scouts d'Haïti, member of the World Organization of the Scout Movement
