= Scouting and Guiding in Uruguay =

Scouting and Guiding associations in Uruguay

The Scout and Guide movement in Uruguay is served by

- Asociación Guías Scout del Uruguay, former member of the World Association of Girl Guides and Girl Scouts
- Movimiento Scout del Uruguay, member of the World Organization of the Scout Movement
- Scouts de Uruguay
- Asociación Uruguaya de Escultismo
- Conquistadores de la Iglesia Adventista, affiliated to Pathfinders
- Union de Scouts Tradicionales de America Uruguay, member of the Order of World Scouts

== International Scouting units in Uruguay ==
In addition, there are American Boy Scouts in Montevideo, linked to the Direct Service branch of the Boy Scouts of America, which supports units around the world, as well as Girl Scouts of the USA.
