= Asociación Guías Scouts del Paraguay =

- Guide Scout Association of Paraguay
- Country: Paraguay
- Founded: 1923/1960
- Membership: 445
- Affiliation: World Association of Girl Guides and Girl Scouts

The Asociación Guías Scouts del Paraguay (roughly Guide Scout Association of Paraguay) is the national Guiding organization of Paraguay.

== See also ==
- Asociación de Scouts del Paraguay
