= The Ghana Scout Association =

National Scouting association of Ghana

- Country: Ghana
- Founded: February 11, 1911
- Membership: 13496
- Chief Scout: Nana Akufo-Addo
- Chief Commissioner: Louis Anopong Okyere
- Affiliation: World Organization of the Scout Movement
- Website https://www.ghanascout.org/

The Ghana Scout Association is the national Scouting association of Ghana. Scouting was founded in the British Gold Coast Colony in 1911 and became a member of the World Organization of the Scout Movement in 1960. The association has 3,919 members as of 2011. By 2019, the association has 13,496 members. In 2007, the Chief Scout was President John Agyekum Kufuor.

Scouts are involved in many community service projects. Most of these projects take place in rural areas where Scouts organize the people to assist in these projects. Some of these projects are the construction of health centers, schools and clean water.

Scouts are also involved in farming, tree planting and helping to run plants that raise fish.

== Early years ==
As a young man, Samuel Wood won a drawing competition, sponsored by the British newspaper The Sheffield Weekly. The prize was a school scholarship, but Wood was unable to take it up as he could not afford the cost of travelling to the United Kingdom. Instead, he was sent books and a subscription to the newspaper. One of the books was Baden-Powell's Scouting for Boys. Wood wrote to Imperial Headquarters of the Scout Movement, in London, and asked them how he could start his own Scout group. A charter was given on 1912-01-04 for the first Gold Coast Scout group. Other groups soon started in other parts of the country.

Samuel Wood continued to be active in Scouting and due to his efforts, the Gold Coast became the first Crown Colony to legislate for the protection of the Scout and Guide Movement. Wood died on 1952-09-09.

== Program ==
The association is divided in four sections according to age:

- Cubs aged 7 – 11 years
- Scouts aged 11½ - 14 years
- Ventures aged 14 ½ - 17 years
- Rovers aged 17 – 22 years

== See also ==
- The Ghana Girl Guides Association
- Prempeh I
