= Association des Scouts du Burundi =

National Scouting organization of Burundi

- Scout Association of Burundi
- Country: Burundi
- Founded: 1940
- Membership: 104,874 (2021)
- Affiliation: World Organization of the Scout Movement
- Website https://web.archive.org/web/20110904125500/http://scoutsburundi.org/

The Association des Scouts du Burundi, the national Scouting organization of Burundi, was founded in 1940, and became a member of the World Organization of the Scout Movement in 1979. The coeducational Association des Scouts du Burundi has 104,874 members as of 2021.

The Scout program is oriented towards rural needs of the population which includes farming, reforestation, erosion control, and village health.

== Program sections ==
- Louveteaux (Cub Scouts) - ages 7 to 11
- Eclaireurs (Scouts) - ages 12 to 15
- Routiers (Rover Scouts) - ages 16 to 19

The Scout Motto is Uwe Tayari in Swahili, Be Prepared in English, Ube Maso in Kirundi, and Sois Prêt in French.

== See also ==
- Association des Guides du Burundi
- 6th Africa Scout Jamboree 2012
