= Asociación Scouts de Colombia =

National scouting organization in Colombia

- Country: Colombia
- Founded: 1913
- Founder: Miguel Jimenez
- Membership: 245,679
- President: Sc. Diego Alejandro Linares
- Website http://www.scout.org.co/

Asociación Scouts de Colombia is the national Scout organization in Colombia. Founded in 1917, it was accepted into the World Organization of the Scout Movement in 1933. The movement is coeducational, accepting both boys and girls. Asociación Scouts de Colombia has 12,684 members as of 2021 (reported by WOSM) and 15,000 members as of 2023 (reported by ASC).

Scouting first appeared in Colombia in 1913, introduced by Miguel Jimenez, who was living in England at the time. He returned to Colombia and brought Scouting back with him.

Outdoor activities and community service are important parts of the Scout program in Colombia. Scouts participate in national festivals and holidays. They help in sports events, disaster relief and first aid situations. There is also a strong emphasis on conservation and ecology.

== Program and ideals ==
The Scouts de Colombia focus on several strategic priorities, including youth participation, social impact, educational methods, communications and relations, diversity and inclusion, and governance.

Scout's sections:

- Manada (Lobatos) - ages 6 to 10
- Tropa (Scouts) - ages 11 to 14
- Comunidad (Caminantes) - ages 15 to 17
- Clan (Rover Scouts) - ages 18 to 22

All sections are coeducational.

The Scout Motto is Siempre Listo, Always Prepared.

The membership badge of Asociación Scouts de Colombia incorporates a shield featuring the flag of Colombia.

The organization is divided into various Scout regions across Colombia and consists of numerous scout groups and active members.

=== Vision 2025 ===
By 2025, the Scouts de Colombia aims to be one of the leading youth movements in the country, enabling 50,000 young people to become active citizens and peacebuilders. They aim to create positive change in their communities based on shared values.

=== Air Scouts ===
At present only one Air Scout Group - 'Tigres Del Aire' - is known of in Colombia. The Colombian Air Scouts was created during the administration of Lieutenant General Gustavo Rojas Pinilla and were then directed in 1957 by Captain Alejandro Garcia; the heads of this group were privileged to study at the school established by the Civil Aviation General Rojas and began a career in commercial aviation.

== Scout Oath ==
The Scouts de Colombia promotes unity and the practice of Scout Law and Promise principles.

Por mi honor y con la gracia de Dios,

yo prometo hacer todo cuanto de mi dependa,

para cumplir con mis deberes con Dios y la patria,

ayudar al prójimo en toda circunstancia

y cumplir fielmente la Ley Scout.

By my honor and with the grace of God,

I promise to do my best

to fulfill my duties to God and to my country,

to help my fellowman in all circumstances

and to faithfully obey the Scout Law.

== See also ==
- Scouting in Colombia
