= Scouting and Guiding in Colombia =

Scouting and Guiding associations in Colombia

Corporación Scouts de Antioquia

Scouting and Guiding in Colombia refers to the set of associations, groups, and the history of the Scout Movement and Guide Movement within Colombian territory. In Colombia, several scout associations are present, including the World Organization of Christian Scouts, the Asociación Scouts de Colombia (Scout Association of Colombia, ASC), the Asociación de Guías Scouts de Colombia (Girl Scout Association of Colombia), the Catholic Scout Movement (MSC), the Colombian Scouting Association (ACE), the Scout Brotherhood of Colombia (FDSC), the Federation of Christian Scout Communities (CCS), Independent Explorers of Colombia (EIC), the Scouts Corporation of Antioquia (CSA), the Scout Corporation of Bogotá and Cundinamarca (CSBC), the Traditional Scout Corporation Colombia (Scout CST), the Scout Corporation of Norte de Santander (CSNS), the Scout Corporation of Risaralda (CSR) and the National Federation of Traditional Scouting (FENET). The ASC is the oldest, founded in Bogotá in 1913, when Colonel Washington Montero, who was head of a Chilean military mission in Colombia and directed the Military School of Cadets of Bogotá, together with the Colombian Luis Cano, who knew the Scout Movement in Chile, began the history of the Movement in this country.

Journalist Miguel Jiménez López, who had been in England, was in charge of connecting the nascent experience with the British origins in publications that appeared in El País from June 20, 1913. Other characters that are preponderant within the history of the movement in Colombia are Jorge Cock Quevedo and Jorge Castaño Duque in Medellín. The founder of the Scout Movement, British General Baden-Powell, had knowledge of the nascent experience in the South American country, although he did not make himself present. His wife, Olave Baden-Powell, did visit the country in the 1970s as an emissary of the ideals of the World Father of Scouting.

Currently, there are at least four nationwide operating Scouting and Guiding organizations in Colombia:

- Asociación Scouts de Colombia (Scout Association of Colombia); member of the World Organization of the Scout Movement; co-educational, 13,348 members
- Asociación de Guías Scouts de Colombia (Girl Scout Association of Colombia); member of the World Association of Girl Guides and Girl Scouts; girls-only, 627 members
- Corporación Scouts de Antioquia (Scouts Corporation of Antioquia, CSA), operating in the province of Antioquia, divided in districts inside the region whose main center is in the metropolitan city of Medellín. The CSA traces its origin to the beginning of the Boy Scouts in Colombia with Sir Jorge Cock Quevedo in 1918. More than 1,500 Scouts are currently enrolled in this movement.
- Asociación Colombiana de Escultismo (Colombian Scout Association, Scouts ACE); member of the World Federation of Independent Scouts
