= Asociación de Scouts de El Salvador =

National Scouting organization of El Salvador

- Headquarters: Casa Scout San Salvador
- Location: Av. Baden Powell 281, San Salvador
- Country: El Salvador
- Membership: 2,820
- Affiliation: World Organization of the Scout Movement
- Website www.scouts.org.sv

The Asociación de Scouts de El Salvador (Scout Association of El Salvador) is the national Scouting organization of El Salvador. Scouting in El Salvador was founded in 1938 and became a member of the World Organization of the Scout Movement in 1940. The association has 2,820 members as of 2011.

The program emphasis is moral values, earth conservation, ecology and community service. The program is continually changed to adapt to the needs of the youth in the country. It has been co-ed since 1981.

Scouts are working to promote peace and have been involved with UNICEF on refugee projects. They worked with the Red Cross during many disasters, such as earthquakes and hurricanes.

== Program and ideals ==
- Lobatos/Cubs - ages 7 to 11
- Scout - ages 11 to 15
- Caminantes - ages 15 to 17

Founded on May 1, 2003, Caminantes (Walkers) are the newest branch, and try to give vent to the high school-age needs.

- Rovers-ages 17 to 21

The Scout Motto is Siempre Listo, Always Prepared. The membership badge of Asociación de Scouts de El Salvador is formed in the shape of a Cross of Saint James, the ends having a shape like a fleur-de-lis.

== See also ==
- Asociación de Muchachas Guías de El Salvador
