= The Ghana Girl Guides Association =

National Guiding organization of Ghana

- Headquarters: Accra
- Country: Ghana
- Founded: 1921
- Founder: Mrs. Elsie Ofuatey-Kodjoe
- Membership: 26,909
- Affiliation: World Association of Girl Guides and Girl Scouts
- Website http://girlguidesghana.org/

The Ghana Girl Guides Association (GGGA) is the National Guiding organization of Ghana. It serves 26,909 members (as of 2014). Founded in 1921 in Accra, the girls-only organization became a full member of the World Association of Girl Guides and Girl Scouts in 1960. GGGA is supported by its parent association, the World Association of Girl Guides and Girl Scouts.

== Sections ==
- Huhuwa Guides - aged 4 – 7
- Ananse Guides - aged 7 – 10
- Girl Guides - aged 10 – 14
- Ranger Guides - aged 14–25

== Ananse (Brownies) Guides ==
An Ananse is a member of a Guiding organization for girls aged seven years old to ten years old.

Brownies were first organized by Lord Baden-Powell in 1914, to complete the range of age groups for girls in Scouting. They were first run as the youngest group in the Guide Association by Agnes Baden-Powell, Lord Baden-Powell's younger sister. In 1918 his wife Lady Olave Baden-Powell took over the responsibility for the Girl Guides and thus for Brownies.

The Brownies Motto: “Always Ready to Help”.

Their Promise:

I promise that I will do my best

To do my duty to God

To serve my country, help other people

And to keep the Ananse Guide Law“

An Ananse Guide is truthful, obedient and cheerful and thinks of others before herself”

Ananse Guides often partake in activities including community service and arts and crafts.

The Group is called a Pack. They are always put into a group of six and they are called sixes. The leader in a group is called Sixer assisted by her Second.

See also

- The Ghana Scout Association
