= Movimiento Scout del Uruguay =

- National emblem of the Movimiento Scout del Uruguay
- Location: Andrés Martinez Trueba 1185/1187, 11200 C.P. Montevideo
- Country: Uruguay
- Founded: 1947
- Membership: 1,549
- Affiliation: World Organization of the Scout Movement
- Website https://msu.edu.uy

The Movimiento Scout del Uruguay (MSU) is the national Scouting organization of Uruguay, and a member of the World Organization of the Scout Movement. Scouting was founded in Uruguay in 1947 and became a member of WOSM in 1950. MSU has 1,549 members (as of 2011).

Asociación Scouts del Uruguay (ASU, Scout Association of Uruguay) and Asociación de Scouts Católicos del Uruguay (ASCU, Catholic Scouts of Uruguay) merged to form the Movimento Scout del Uruguay in 1994.

== Program ==
Scouts are active in community service and step in to help the government in times of disaster or special need.

=== Branches ===
The association is divided into four branches:

- Lobatos (Cub Scouts)-ages 8 to 10
- Scouts-ages 11 to 13
- Pioneros (Pioneers)-ages 14 to 16
- Rovers-ages 17 to 19

=== Scout Law ===
- El scout es digno de confianza.
- El scout es leal.
- El scout sirve al prójimo y a la comunidad sin esperar recompensa.
- El scout es hermano de todo scout y promueve la fraternidad entre los hombres.
- El scout es justo y constructor de la justicia.
- El scout protege y ama la vida porque ella proviene de Dios.
- El scout sabe obedecer en forma libre y responsable.
- El scout enfrenta sus dificultades con alegría y coraje.
- El scout es trabajador y respeta el bien común.
- El scout es puro en pensamientos, palabras y acciones.

=== Scout Oath ===
Prometo hacer todo lo posible por cumplir mis deberes para con Dios y la sociedad, ayudar al prójimo en toda circunstancia y cumplir fielmente la Ley Scout.

=== Scout Motto ===
Siempre Listo, Always ready

== See also ==
- Scouting and Guiding in Uruguay
- Asociación Guías Scout del Uruguay
