= Asociación de Scouts del Ecuador =

National Scouting organization of Ecuador

- Location: Av. America N35-101 and Mañosca, Quito
- Country: Ecuador
- Membership: 3,220
- Affiliation: World Organization of the Scout Movement
- Website www.scoutsecuador.org

The Asociación de Scouts del Ecuador, the national Scouting organization of Ecuador, was founded in 1920, and became a member of the World Organization of the Scout Movement in 1922. The coeducational Asociación de Scouts del Ecuador has 3,220 members as of 2011.

Cristóbal Vela introduced Scouting to boys in Quito which spread to other cities of the Highland Region, although they are less known in the Coast Region.

Scouting is a respected organization in Ecuador and has been declared an "institution useful for the public welfare" by the government. Service activities are part of the Scout program. Scouts are a welcome sight during Ecuador's frequent earthquakes, as they are well organized and most helpful.

== Program sections and ideals ==
- Lobatos (Wolf Cubs)-ages 7 to 11
- Scouts-ages 12 to 15
- Caminantes (Venturer)-ages 15 to 17
- Rovers-ages 18 to 25

The Lobato (Cub) motto is Siempre Mejor, Always Better; the Scout Motto is Siempre listo, Always Ready; the Caminante (Venturer) motto is Siempre Alerta, Always Alert; and the Rover motto is Siempre Sirviendo, Always Serving.

The membership badge of the Asociación de Scouts del Ecuador incorporates the Mitad del Mundo monument delineating the equator.

== Scout Oath ==
Prometo por mi honor hacer todo cuanto de mi dependa para cumplir mis deberes Para con Dios y la patria, ayudar al projimo en toda circumstancia y cumplir fielmente la ley Scout.

I promise on my honor, that I will do my duty to God and to the fatherland, that I will help my fellow man in any circumstance and comply faithfully to the Scout Law.

== Scout Law ==
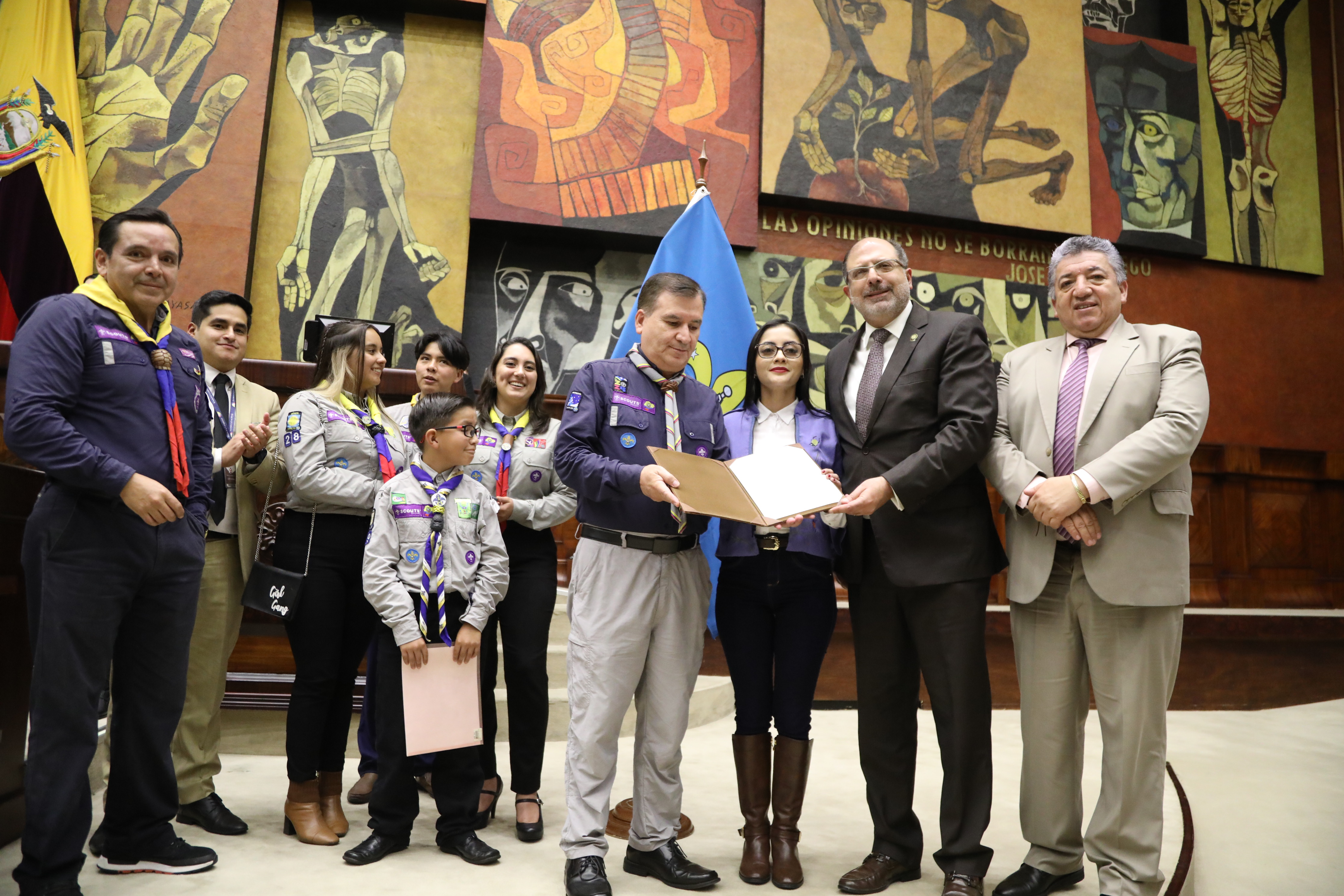
The Asociación de Scouts del Ecuador at the National Assembly in 2024

- El Scout cifra su honor en ser digno de confianza.

The Scout measures his honor in being trustworthy.

- El Scout es Leal.

The Scout is Loyal.

- El Scout es útil y ayuda a los demás sin pensar en recompensa.

The Scout is useful and helps others without thinking of compensation.

- El Scout es amigo de todos y hermano de cualquier Scout sin distinción de credo, raza o clase social.

The Scout is friend of all and brother of any Scout without distinction of belief, race, or social class.

- El Scout es cortés y caballeroso.

The Scout is polite and chivalrous.

- El Scout ve en la Naturaleza la Obra de Dios; protege a los animales y a las plantas.

The Scout sees in Nature God's Work; he protects animals and plants.

- El Scout obedece sin replicar y no hace nada a medias.

The Scout obeys without talking back and doesn't do anything halfway.

- El Scout sonríe y canta en sus dificultades.

The Scout smiles and sings in his difficulties.

- El Scout es económico, trabajador y cuidadoso del bien ajeno.

The Scout is thrifty, hardworking and careful of the property of others.

- El Scout es limpio y sano; puro en pensamiento, palabra y acciones.

The Scout is clean and healthy; pure in thought, word and actions.

== See also ==
- Asociación Nacional de Guías Scouts del Ecuador
