= Fédération du Scoutisme Tchadien =

Fédération du Scoutisme Tchadien/Federation of Chadian Scouting
- The membership badge of the Scouts du Tchad incorporates a baobab tree, as well as a cross potent, and is sometimes rendered in the national colors of the flag of Chad.
- Country: Chad
- Founded: 1960
- Membership: 14,500
- Affiliation: World Organization of the Scout Movement

The Fédération du Scoutisme Tchadien (Federation of Chadian Scouting), the national federation of two Scouting organizations in Chad, was founded in 1960, and became a member of the World Organization of the Scout Movement in 1974. The coeducational Fédération du Scoutisme Tchadien has 14,500 members as of 2011.

The Fédération du Scoutisme Tchadien is composed of two associations, the Eclaireurs et Eclaireuses du Tchad, which is for both boys and girls, and Scouts du Tchad, which is for boys only. The two associations are autonomous, and are both registered by the government as organizations useful to public welfare. In addition, the Scouts Catholiques du Tchad serve Scouts in the Saharan nation.

Scouting was founded in French Equatorial Africa in 1941. Since participating in the first World Scout Community Development Seminar in Dahomey, Chad has had a strong community development emphasis in its Scouting.

Chad is a very poor country beset by political unrest and tribal rivalries, which influence the development of Scouting in Chad. Scouting is primarily active in the districts in the south, as it is considered too dangerous in the north. The Scout movement has few available well-trained leaders, but it shows great energy and has performed well in nature conservation and in community development.

Scouts are involved in community development activities and conservation, including cultivation of cereals, fruit trees and other crop tree planting, digging wells and building housing for the aged and disabled. Scouts also participate in National Literacy Day and in other community service activities such as helping to build schools and to keep up public places, hospitals, etc.

In rural areas, Scouts use money earned from the sale of their own farm produce to buy medicine. They use these medicines in four pharmacies that they run themselves. Scouts also participate in helping to build schools, and help maintain public places and hospitals.

== Sections ==
- Louveteaux (Cub Scouts) - ages 8 to 12
- Scouts - ages 12 to 16
- Routiers (Rover Scouts) - ages 16 and up

The Scout Motto is Toujours Prêt, Always Prepared in French.

== See also ==
- Association des Guides du Tchad
