= Asociación Nacional de Guías Scouts del Ecuador =

- National Girl Guide Association of Ecuador
- Country: Ecuador
- Founded: 1919
- Membership: 225
- Affiliation: World Association of Girl Guides and Girl Scouts
- Website http://www.guiasecuador.weebly.com/

The Asociación Nacional de Guías Scouts del Ecuador (ANGSE; National Girl Guide Association of Ecuador) is the national Guiding organization of Ecuador. It serves 225 members (as of 2003). Founded in 1919, the girls-only organization became a full member of the World Association of Girl Guides and Girl Scouts in 1966.

== Program ==
The association is divided in four branches according to age:

- Alitas - ages 7 to 10
- Juniors - ages 11 to 13
- Cadetes - ages 14 to 16
- Guías Mayores - ages 16 to 18

== Emblem ==
The membership badge of the Asociación Nacional de Guías Scouts del Ecuador incorporates the Ciudad Mitad del Mundo monument delineating the equator.

== See also ==
- Asociación de Scouts del Ecuador
