= Association des Guides du Tchad =

National Guiding organization of Chad

- Guide Association of Chad
- Country: Chad
- Founded: 1956
- Membership: 4,510
- Affiliation: World Association of Girl Guides and Girl Scouts

The Association des Guides du Tchad (AGT, Guide Association of Chad) is the national Guiding organization of Chad. The girls-only organization is a full member of the World Association of Girl Guides and Girl Scouts. Girl Guiding in Chad is active in both urban and rural areas. The association has a strong and growing membership, which stood at 15,765 as of 2018.

Girl Guiding in Chad started as a result of colonization under French Equatorial Africa. Between 1956 and 1957, nuns from the French order Sœurs de la Sainte Croix de Jérusalem, who had settled in the north of the country, began to lead a group of Guides in Guera, and gradually, as evangelization spread to the central and southern parts of the country, the Girl Guide movement developed. Today Girl Guiding can be found in the regions where there are religious communities, such as Doba, Moundou and N'Djamena, and recently in Sarh, Goré and Laï.

The Association des Guides du Tchad serves girls aged from six to 17 years. Although Girl Guiding is open to all sections of the community, regardless of belief and ethnic group, the girls who join are mainly Catholic. There are very few Protestants or Muslims.

All leaders and national staff are volunteers. The association has a headquarters building on land given by the Girl Scouts of Japan. The Scouts et Guides de France works with the Guides du Tchad.

== See also ==
- Fédération du Scoutisme Tchadien
