= Baden-Powell Scouts' Association =

Voluntary Scouting association for young people

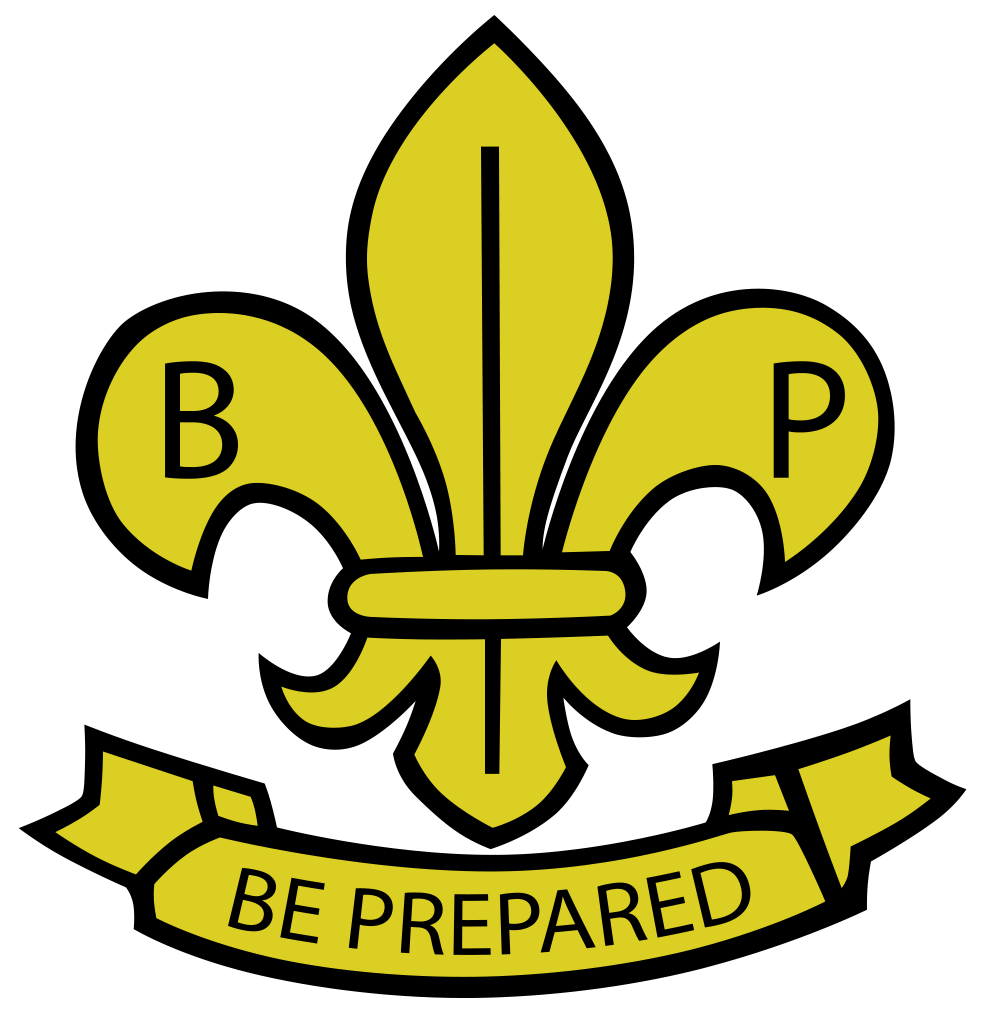
- Country: United Kingdom
- Founded: 1970
- Website http://www.traditionalscouting.co.uk/

Boy Scout	Sea Scout

The Baden-Powell Scouts' Association (B-PSA) is a worldwide youth organisation originating in the United Kingdom, with friendly relationships with similar traditional scouting organisations in various countries. Baden-Powell Scouting focuses on the importance of tradition in the scout movement.

The Baden-Powell Scouts' Association shares the heritage of the youth scouting movement, however they believe in a traditional way of scouting which closely follows the programme set out by Lt. General Robert Baden-Powell in his book Scouting for Boys.

The Baden-Powell Scouts' Association was formed in the United Kingdom in 1970 by the Reverend William Dowling when it was felt that the Scout Association was abandoning the traditions and intentions set out by Baden-Powell in 1908. The Baden-Powell Scouts retain the belief that the essence of the movement should be based on outdoor activities related to the skills of explorers, backwoodsmen and frontiersmen.

It is a voluntary, non-formal educational charity association for young people. It is an independent, non-political, and non-military organisation. The B-PSA believes this programme should be available to everyone.

As an independent scout association, they are members of the World Federation of Independent Scouts (WFIS). The WFIS was formed in Laubach, Germany, in 1996 by Lawrie Dring, a scouter and President of the B-PSA, and scouts from Laubach. The WFIS is an international body that recognises independent scouts associations in countries around the world that teach traditional Baden-Powell scouting values. Their aim is to improve the standard of future citizens with the object of using their efficiency for service for their fellows.

== History ==
For the origins and history of the scout movement generally see: Scouting

Following the origin of the Boy Scout Movement and, in 1908, the publication of Robert Baden-Powell's book, Scouting for Boys, the Boy Scouts Association was formed in 1910 and, until 1967, it followed the programme established by Baden-Powell. However, the publication of the Chief Scouts' Advance Party Report, introduced major changes to that association's name, uniform, sections and programme.

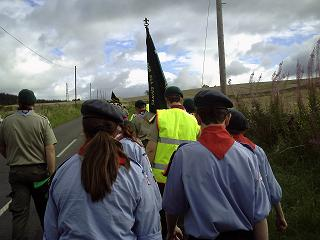
B-PSA Scouts and Air Scouts marching to the Carr Edge camp site, 22 August 2008

In 1969, some of those, led by the Reverend William Dowling, who did not agree with changes being introduced following the Advance Party Report formed a pressure group within the Scout Association, known as 'the Scout Action Group'. They asked that Scout Groups wishing to maintain a more traditional approach to Scouting should be allowed to do so. In mid-1970 the Scout Action Group published A Boy Scout Black Paper, which outlined their views.

As a result of discussions, the whole organisation fractioned into two groups on 20 September 1970 – The Scout Association and the Baden-Powell Scouts' Association.

In 1979, due to internal arguments, the Baden-Powell Scouts' Association split into two organisations, with both claiming the name and charity number of the association. The two factions reconciled their differences in June 1990, and in 1994 there were nearly 70 groups in the association.

In the 1990s there was a dip in the number of active groups in the Baden-Powell Scouts' Association, in common with a fall in numbers experienced by the various United Kingdom Scout organisations at that time, and the number of groups had dropped to around 40 in 2001. The Baden-Powell Scouts' Association, as with Scouting in the United Kingdom generally, has shown subsequent growth in numbers with the opening of new groups. A report in The Times in August 2004 gave a membership of 5,000 in 56 groups.

The B-PSA celebrated 100 years of Scouting in 2007, issuing centenary badges and holding their own Centenary Camp in Southampton.

Jamboree 2008, marked the centenary of the first official Scout Camp held by Baden-Powell at Humshaugh. The event included parades at Hexham Abbey and a ceremony at the original Carr Edge camp site.

== Aims, methods and ideals ==
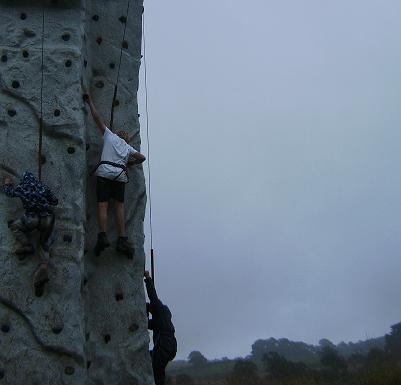
BPSA Scouts developing climbing skills, August 2008

The main policy is Traditional Scouting – which is taking Baden-Powell's original nine Scout Laws and the later 10th Scout Law and using them, along with Baden-Powell's original training programme and rank system.

Once a Scout is invested Baden-Powell believed that he would continue to live the Scout Law. This law is kept by Scouts from the age of ten and Adult Leaders must renew their promise on regular occasions. The original Scout Law, written by Baden-Powell, appeared in 1908. The Baden-Powell Scouts' Association uses his 1911 version, which is as follows:

1. A Scout's honour is to be trusted
2. A Scout is loyal to the King and to his officers, and to his country, and to his employers.
3. A Scout's duty is to be useful and to help others.
4. A Scout is a friend to all and a brother to every other Scout, no matter to what social class the other belongs.
5. A Scout is courteous.
6. A Scout is a friend to animals.
7. A Scout obeys orders of his patrol leader or Scout master without question.
8. A Scout smiles and whistles under all difficulties.
9. A Scout is thrifty.
10. A Scout is clean in thought, word and deed.

The Baden-Powell Scouts' Association hold to the ideals of Scouting that were created by Baden-Powell. The association's heritage dates back to the foundations of Scouting in the UK in 1908. The association follows a charter set down in their Policy Association Rules. They have no paid Executive Staff or Leaders.

The traditional programme also develops a sense of duty, personal discipline and honour. In addition to a wide range of activities Scouts in the B-PSA continue to practise traditional Scouting skills:

- lighting fire by friction
- navigating by means other than a compass
- backwoods cooking
- camping in self erected "bivvys"

The Baden-Powell Scouts' Association are members of the World Federation of Independent Scouts. The Baden-Powell Scouts use the original programmes and wear traditional uniforms. Wolf Cubs continue to use the Grand Howl at the beginning and end of their meetings.

The advancement program for members of the Baden-Powell Scouts' Association is symbolised by the earning of badges and awards.

In Wolf Cubs this consists of Tenderpad, First Star and Second Star – working towards the final award of Leaping Wolf. The First and Second Stars are worn on the Cub's cap, this positioning leading them to sometimes be referred to as one, then both, eyes open.

In the Scouts section they use the same ranks as in Scouting for Boys with Tenderfoot, Second Class, First Class, and the Scout Cord. Senior Scouts can earn the Bushman's Thong (with variations for Air and Sea Scouts) and the St. George's Scout award, which takes the place of the Queen's Scout award. Rover Scouts are able to earn the Baden-Powell Award.

The requirements for these badges, and the overall designs of the award badges, remain true to the pre-1967 Boy Scouts Association requirements and designs, with the stars on the original awards being replaced by the initials B and P, and the word "BOY" being replaced by "B-P".

== Uniform ==
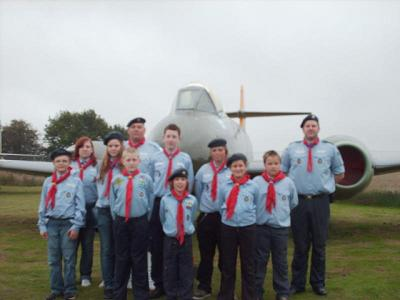
BPSA Air Scouts, July 2008

The Scout sections wear the traditional uniform designed by Baden-Powell.

- Headwear: Campaign hat or beret, with the Section badge in front.
- Neckerchief: Of the group colour worn with a woggle or a loose knot at the throat.
- Shirt: In non-Sea Scout or Air Scout Groups, a khaki shirt. Air Scouts wear Wedgwood Blue.
- Shorts or trousers: Khaki or dark blue for Air Scouts.
- Belt: Brown leather, official pattern.
- Socks: Any plain colour, worn turned down below the knee
- Boots or shoes: Brown or black.
- Shoulder badge: Indicating the group, worn on the right shoulder.

== Organisation ==
=== Sections ===
The Baden-Powell Scout's Association retains the pre-Advance Party Report (1967) sections, the traditional UK Scout sections developed by Baden-Powell, to which Beavers were added in 1982. The association is open to males and females in mixed and separate sections.

The sections (Beavers to Senior Scouts) are led by a Section Master, who must hold a warrant for the position, aided by assistants. Other adults who help run a section may be volunteers (such as parents of children in the group), Instructors (Scouts, Senior Scouts and Rovers that have been trained to assist the leaders), and members of the group executive committee who help operate the group financially. Rover Crews mainly govern themselves, but are assisted by a Rover Scout Leader who ensures that the crew is working within the rules of the association.

Section	Ages	Controlled by	Activities
Beavers	5–8	Group	A program of outdoor activities, creative play, music, and cooperative games.
Wolf Cubs	7½–11	Group	Introduction to the Scouting skills needed for their future life in the Troop.
Scouts	10½–15	Group	The B–P Scouts follow much the same Training Scheme as laid down by Baden-Powell in Scouting For Boys.
Senior Scouts	15–18	Group	Increased emphasis on personal challenge and adventure. The St. George's Award is the highest gained.
Rover Scouts	18+	Group	The final stage in the system of training. The highest award is the Baden-Powell Award.

=== Group branches ===
There are Air Scouts and the provision for Sea Scouts within the organisation. These branches follow the same core programme as other sections but add more aeronautical or nautical emphasis depending on the branch.

== Child protection ==
In common with other United Kingdom youth organisations all adults have to undergo extended criminal record checks since their introduction in 1997. New leaders are required to give personal references and complete an interview before taking an appointment. The B-PSA has a child protection officer and there is a full child protection policy in place.

Each international association follows the child protection measures expected in their own country.

== International associations ==
=== Australia ===
The 1st Devonport Scouts in Tasmania under Alan Richmond, OAM, several groups in South Australia under Frank Payne and later groups in New South Wales and another in Queensland affiliated with the B-PSA.

=== Canada ===
The B-PSA was first organised in Canada in Victoria, British Columbia in February 1996 as the Baden-Powell Scouts' Association of Canada (BPSA Canada). Scouts Canada lodged a complaint against this name with Industry Canada. This prompted the association to reorganise on a provincial basis. BPSA Associations currently operate in British Columbia, Alberta, Ontario, New Brunswick, and Nova Scotia.

=== Denmark ===
The Yellow Scouts of Denmark – Baden-Powell Scouts (De Gule Speijdere i Danmark) started on 25 February 1984, as "Det Danske Pige- og Drenge Spejderkorps", aiming to return to a more traditional Scouting approach as a response to changes in the mainstream Danish Scouting movement.

=== Ghana ===
The Baden-Powell Scouts Association is active in Ghana. The Baden-Powell Scouts of Ghana operates in Accra, Ghana. It has a Beaver Lodge of 40, two Wolf Cub Packs of 30 and a Scout Troop of 48 members.

=== Malta ===
Baden-Powell Scouts Malta was set up in 2011 and there are currently seven active groups located in Mtarfa, Mgarr (Sea Scouts), Luqa (Air Scouts), Qormi, St Paul's Bay (Sea Scouts), Bahrija and Zebbug. BPSM was admitted to full membership of WFIS in 2014.

=== United States ===
The Baden-Powell Scout Association became a registered corporation in the United States in June 2002, and was issued federal non-profit organisation status, operating the 1st Tarrant Scout Group in Texas, notable as the first B-PSA group to operate in the United States. B-PSA was affiliated with the Baden-Powell Scouts Association of England before they ceased operations, possibly about 2010.

Also in the US is the Baden-Powell Service Association (United States) (BPSA-US), formed in 2006 and later incorporated in California, 2009. BPSA-US is not directly affiliated with the Baden-Powell Scouts' Association, but is part of the traditional Scouting movement and a member of the World Federation of Independent Scouts. BPSA-US has worked closely with members of the Baden-Powell Scouts' Association and the Baden-Powell Service Association in Canada, and is working with others in defining their traditional Scouting program.

== See also ==
- Brownsea Island Scout camp – the birthplace of World Scouting
- Humshaugh – location of Baden-Powell's first official Scout Camp
