= Asociación de Scouts del Paraguay =

National Scouting organization of Paraguay

- Scout Association of Paraguay
- Location: Fernando de la Mora
- Country: Paraguay
- Founded: 1960
- Membership: 1850
- Presidente: Letizia González
- Jefe Scout Nacional: Roxana Sánchez
- Affiliation: World Organization of the Scout Movement
- Website www.scouts.org.py

The Asociación de Scouts del Paraguay (ASP, roughly Scout Association of Paraguay) is the national Scouting organization of Paraguay. Scouting in Paraguay was founded in 1960 and became a member of the World Organization of the Scout Movement in 1962. The coeducational association has 1.170 members (as of 2024).

== Program sections ==
- manada-7 to 11
- Scouts-12 to 15
- caminantes-16 to 18
- Rovers-19 to 22

== Scout Motto ==
Siempre Listo, Always Prepared.

Historic emblem of Asociación de Scouts del Paraguay

== Scout Oath ==
Por mi honor prometo hacer todo cuanto de mi dependa para, cumplir com mis deberes para con Dios y la patria ayudar al projimo en todas circunstancias y cumplir fielmente la Ley Scout.

By my honour I promise to make everything on my reach to obey my responsibilities with God and my country, help my neighbour in all circumstances and loyally obey the Scout Law.

== See also ==
- Asociación Guías Scouts del Paraguay
