= Asociación de Muchachas Guías de El Salvador =

National Guiding organization of El Salvador

- Girl Guide Association of El Salvador
- Headquarters: Avenida Maracaibo 621, Colonia Miramonte, San Salvador
- Country: El Salvador
- Founded: 1945
- Membership: 499
- Affiliation: World Association of Girl Guides and Girl Scouts

The Asociación de Muchachas Guías de El Salvador (Girl Guide Association of El Salvador) is the national Guiding organization of El Salvador. It serves 499 members (as of 2012). Founded in 1944, the girls-only organization became an associate member of the World Association of Girl Guides and Girl Scouts in 1949 and a full member in 1960.

The association is divided in four branches according to age:

- Abejita - ages 4 to 6
- Alitas - ages 6 to 11
- Intermedias - ages 11 to 15
- Guía Mayor - ages 15 to 18

The Guide Motto is Siempre listas.

== See also ==
- Asociación de Scouts de El Salvador
