= Scouting and Guiding in China =

Scouting in China may refer to:

- Scouting and Guiding in mainland China
- Scouting and Guiding in Hong Kong
- Scouting and Guiding in Macao
- Scouting in the Republic of China
- Boy Scouts of Manchukuo
