= Scouting in the Republic of China =

Scouting and Guiding Organizations in the Republic of China

The Scout movement and Guiding in the Republic of China (Taiwan) is served by:

- Girl Scouts of Taiwan, member of the World Association of Girl Guides and Girl Scouts
- Scouts of China, member of the World Organization of the Scout Movement

== International Scouting units in the Republic of China ==
The Republic of China also has active expatriate Scout groups, including two organizations focused on serving children of American military families living in Taiwan Area and elsewhere in eastern Asia and the western Pacific: USA Girl Scouts Overseas, and Boy Scouts of America, serviced by the Taiwan District of the Far East Council. These councils serve BSA and GSUSA units composed of children of diplomatic, business and military personnel, and international units run under their auspices.

== First World Jamboree for Ethnic Chinese Scouts ==
The First World Jamboree for Ethnic Chinese Scouts (第1次全球華人大露營), to promote cooperation and friendship among ethnic Chinese Scouts and strengthening of the World Scout Movement, was held 3 – 9 July 2009 at Wusanto Reservoir, Tainan, southern Taiwan.

== See also ==
- Scouting and Guiding in Mainland China
- Scouting and Guiding in Hong Kong
- Scouting and Guiding in Macau
- Boy Scouts of Manchukuo
