= Scouting controversy and conflict =

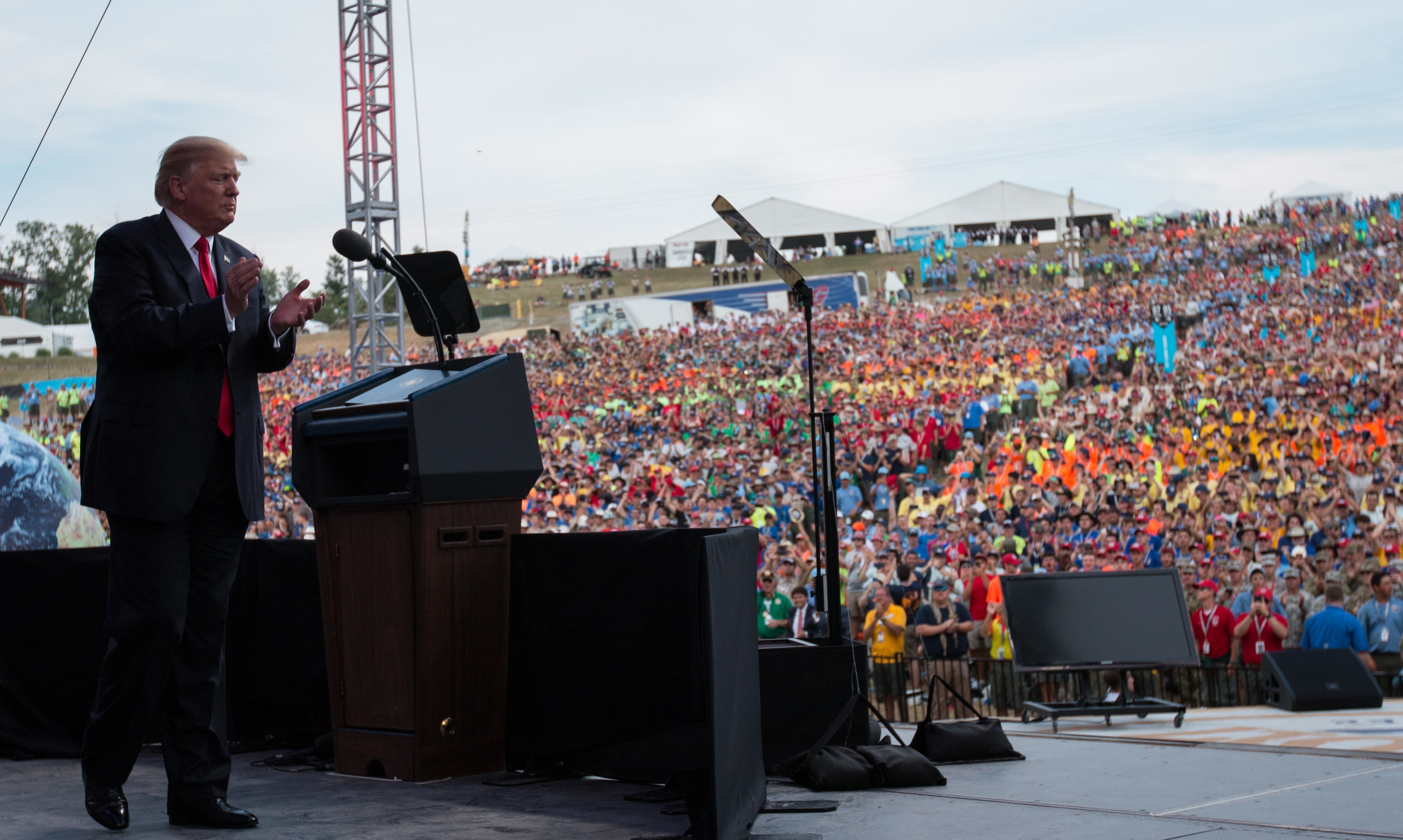
- President Donald J. Trump visits the 2017 National Jamboree

There are various controversies and conflicts that involve the Scouting movement. Scouting has sometimes become entangled in social controversies such as in nationalist resistance movements in India. Scouting was introduced to Africa by British officials as an instrument of colonial authority but became a subversive challenge to the legitimacy of British imperialism as Scouting fostered solidarity amongst African Scouts. There are also controversies and challenges within the Scout Movement itself such as current efforts to turn Scouts Canada into a democratic organization (see also Non-aligned Scouting and Scout-like organisations).

== Sectarian and secular conflict ==
Religion in Scouting and Guiding is an aspect of the Scout method which has been practiced differently and given different interpretations over the years. In contrast to the Christian-only Boys' Brigade which was started two decades earlier, Baden-Powell founded the Scout movement as a youth organization (with boys as 'Scouts' and girls as 'Guides') which was independent of any single faith or religion, yet still held that spirituality and a belief in a higher power were key to the development of young people.

Scouting organizations are free to interpret the method as laid down by the founder. As the modern world has become more secular and as many societies have become more religiously diverse, this has caused misunderstandings and controversies in some of the national member organizations. There are Scouting associations in some countries, such as France and Denmark, that are segregated on the basis of religious belief.

=== Conflict over atheism ===
In 1933 some Scout groups broke away from the national Boy Scout organization De Nederlandsche Padvinders (NPV, "Netherlands Pathfinders") to form the Padvinders Vereeniging Nederland (PVN, "Pathfinder Association of the Netherlands"), because difficulties concerning the "Scout Promise" arose. The problem was that boys who did not recognize a god still had to promise "To do my duty to God" and the groups were concerned that this could turn those boys into hypocrites. A Roman Catholic organization was founded in 1938, the Katholieke Verkenners (KV, "Catholic Scouts") because the Dutch Roman Catholic bishops decided that Catholic youth should not be under the control of an association whose governing board was not all Catholic. The NPV and the PVN almost reunited in 1940. All Dutch Scout and Guide organizations merged in 1973 into Scouting Nederland (SN).

The Dutch variant of the Scout Promise is one of the few in the world where the reference to God is optional as it has been granted an exception under WOSM guidelines. Since January 2014, The Scout Association allows scouts in the UK to make a promise either with or without reference to God.

== Bans on Scouting by authoritarian regimes ==
Scouting has been banned in certain nations and remains banned in some of them. Scouting was changed into a regime loyal Scout-like organization or banned in nearly all communist countries, most fascist countries, and some other countries with authoritarian regimes such as Afghanistan under the Taliban, Malawi, and Iran. Banning has caused Scouting to go underground in countries such as communist Poland, Francoist Spain, and socialist Myanmar. The Soviet Union banned Scouting in 1922, creating a separate Young Pioneers, which gave birth to the communist Pioneer movement, still existing in some fashion in China, Cuba, Laos, North Korea, and Vietnam, Scouting in Hungary was banned at the beginning of World War II.

Prior to World War II, Germany, Italy, and Romania disbanded Scouting. Instead, Germany created the Hitler Youth organization; Mussolini had a fascist youth organization, the Balilla; and Romania under King Carol II had the Străjeria.

Currently, there are no externally recognized Scouting organizations in Cuba, North Korea, Laos, Vietnam and China (except for the special administrative regions of Hong Kong and Macau).

=== Cuba ===
In 1914, the first Scout groups in Cuba were founded. In the following years more local groups emerged, but they were not connected through a national association until 1927 when the Asociación de Scouts de Cuba (ASC) was founded. In the same year the association became a member of the World Organization of the Scout Movement (WOSM). During its first years, Cuban Scouting followed mainly the model of the Boy Scouts of America.

Scouting existed in Cuba itself until the 1960s, when Cuban Scouting ceased operations after the Cuban revolution of 1959. Cuban Scouts rendered service during those times, directing traffic, collecting rations, helping in hospitals and establishing first aid stations. In 1961, the World Scout Conference terminated the WOSM membership of ASC claiming that they had ceased to exist. Communist leaders replaced the association with the José Martí Pioneer Organization. There is a Cubans-in-exile Association.

Cuba is now one of only six of the world's independent countries that do not have Scouting. Cuba was also a former member of the World Association of Girl Guides and Girl Scouts, with the Asociación de Guías de Cuba last mentioned in 1969.

=== Russia ===
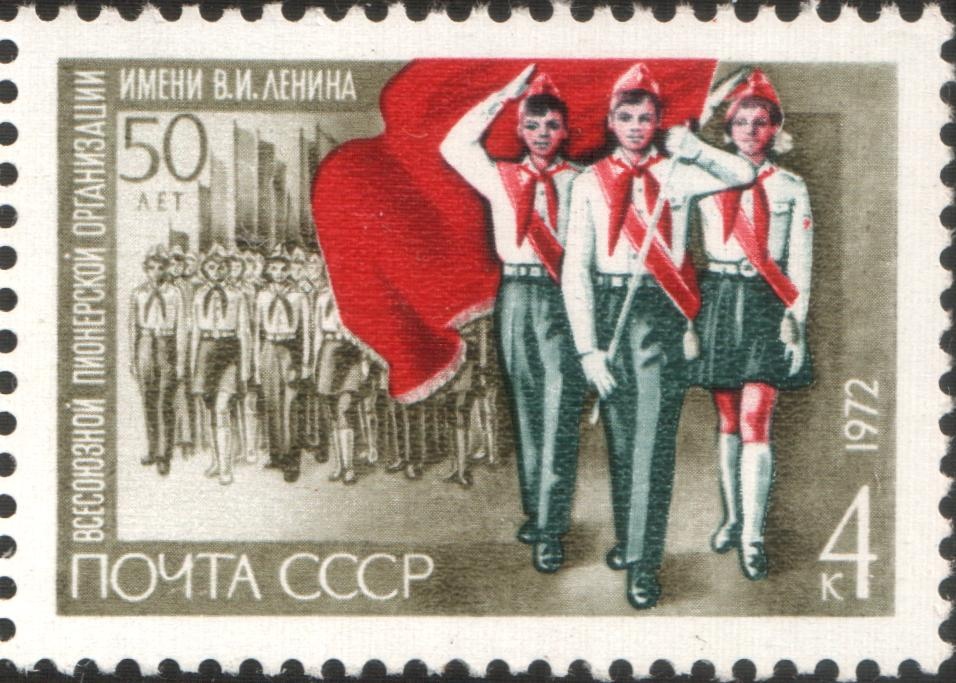
YP 50 years, Stamp, 1972

In 1908, Baden-Powell's book Scouting for Boys came out in Russia by the order of Tsar Nicholas II. In 1909, the first Russian Scout troop was organized and in 1914, a society called Russian Scout, was established. Scouting spread rapidly across Russia and into Siberia.

After the October Revolution of 1917 and during the Russian Civil War from 1917 to 1921, most of the Scoutmasters and many Scouts fought in the ranks of the White Army and interventionists against the Red Army. Some Scouts took the Bolsheviks' side, which would lead to the establishment of ideologically-altered Scoutlike organizations, such as ЮК (Юные Коммунисты, or young communists; pronounced as yuk) and others.

Between 1918 and 1920, the second, third, and fourth All-Russian Congresses of the Russian Union of the Communist Youth decided to eradicate the Scout movement and create an organization of the communist type that would take youth under its umbrella. In 1922, the second All-Russian Komsomol Conference decided to create Pioneer units all over the country; these units were united later that year as the Young Pioneer organization of the Soviet Union.

The Soviet Union (USSR), which included Russia, was established in 1922 and dissolved in 1991. In 1990, the Russian Congress of People's Deputies with Boris Yeltsin as its chairman declared Russia's sovereignty over its territory.

The Young Pioneer organization was broken up in 1990 and the same year the Scout Movement began to reemerge when relaxation of government restrictions allowed youth organizations to be formed to fill the void left by the Pioneers, with various factions competing for recognition. Some former Pioneer leaders have formed Scout groups and there is some controversy as to their motivations in doing so (see Eurasian Scout Region controversies).

The Russian Association of Scouts/Navigators is now a member of the World Organization of the Scout Movement (WOSM). It is co-educational and has 13,920 members as of 2004.

=== Germany ===
German Scouting first started in 1909. In Germany, Scouting later became involved with the German Youth Movement, of which the Wandervogel was a part. Scouting flourished until 1934–35, when nearly all associations were closed and their members had to join the Hitler Youth. In 1940, during World War II, the Nazis placed Robert Baden-Powell the founder of Scouting on their "Black Book", a list of people who were to be arrested in the event of a Nazi invasion of Britain planned to begin that year but was cancelled. This list was not publicly known until 1945, shortly after the Nazis were defeated. Baden-Powell never knew about his inclusion on the list because he died in 1941. In West Germany and West Berlin, Scouting was reestablished after 1945, but it was banned in East Germany until 1990 in favor of the Thälmann Pioneers and the Free German Youth (FDJ). Currently, Scouting is present in all parts of the unified Federal Republic of Germany and consists of about 150 different associations and federations with about 260,000 Scouts and Girl Guides.

== Exclusion of Scouting associations from international organizations ==
Most national Scouting associations have created international Scouting organizations to set standards for and to coordinate activities amongst member associations. There are at least six international organizations that serve several hundred national associations around the world. The largest international Scouting organization is the World Organization of the Scout Movement, founded in 1920. Scouting associations have been excluded or expelled from international Scouting organizations for various reasons.

=== Iraq ===
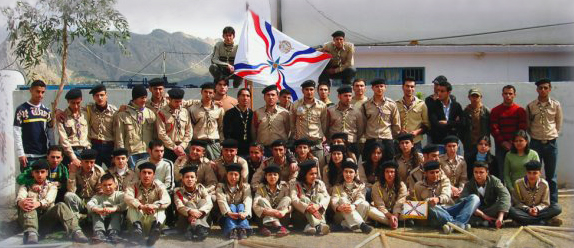
HamorabiScouts Iraq

Iraq was one of the first Arab nations to embrace the Scouting movement, launching its program in 1921, just two years after the League of Nations had created the country out of the old Ottoman Empire. Iraq was a member of the World Organization of the Scout Movement from 1922 to 1940, and again from 1956 to 1999.

After the Baath Party took control in 1968 and especially after Saddam Hussein seized power in 1979, youth groups were retooled to serve the state. One replacement program, Saddam Cubs, offered "summer camps" where 10- to 15-year-old boys had up to 14-hour days filled with hand-to-hand fighting drills. In 1990, during the period when the Iraq Boy Scouts and Girl Guides Council was recognized by WOSM, there were 12,000 Scouts, however by 1999, Iraq had been expelled from the WOSM.

An Iraqi Scouts Initiative committee was formed by Americans in 2004 to formally re-establish a legal, recognized, and fully functioning Scouting program in Iraq. Since then, the movement has been taken over by Iraqis and is now run exclusively by them.

The Scout program is open to boys and girls of all ethnic and cultural backgrounds, and allows for local nuances to shape various regional program options. Iraqi Scouts are involved in community service such as helping police with traffic control, giving first aid, cultivating cotton, planting trees and helping during natural disasters. A National Iraqi Scouting Headquarters is envisioned for Baghdad and five national Scout camps are also planned.

== Exclusion of individuals from Scouting membership ==
Controversies have arisen from the exclusion of certain people, including atheists, agnostics, and/or LGBT people, from membership of some Scouting organisations; these are detailed below.

=== Atheists and agnostics ===
"Duty to God" is a principle of Scouting worldwide, though it is applied differently among countries. Scouting America takes a strong position, excluding atheists and agnostics, while Girl Scouts of the USA takes a more neutral position. The United Kingdom Scout Association has published alternative promises for people of different or no religion, specifying "Atheists, Humanists and people of no specific religion", who make a promise to uphold Scouting values rather than a duty to God. Scouts Canada defines Duty to God broadly in terms of "adherence to spiritual principles" and does not require members to be part of an organized religion, but does require that they have some form of "personal spirituality". In other countries, especially in Europe, some Scouting organizations may be secularist or religiously neutral (such as Eclaireuses et Eclaireurs de France, Corpo Nazionale Giovani Esploratori ed Esploratrici Italiani and the Baden-Powell Service Association in the United States).

=== Homosexual people ===
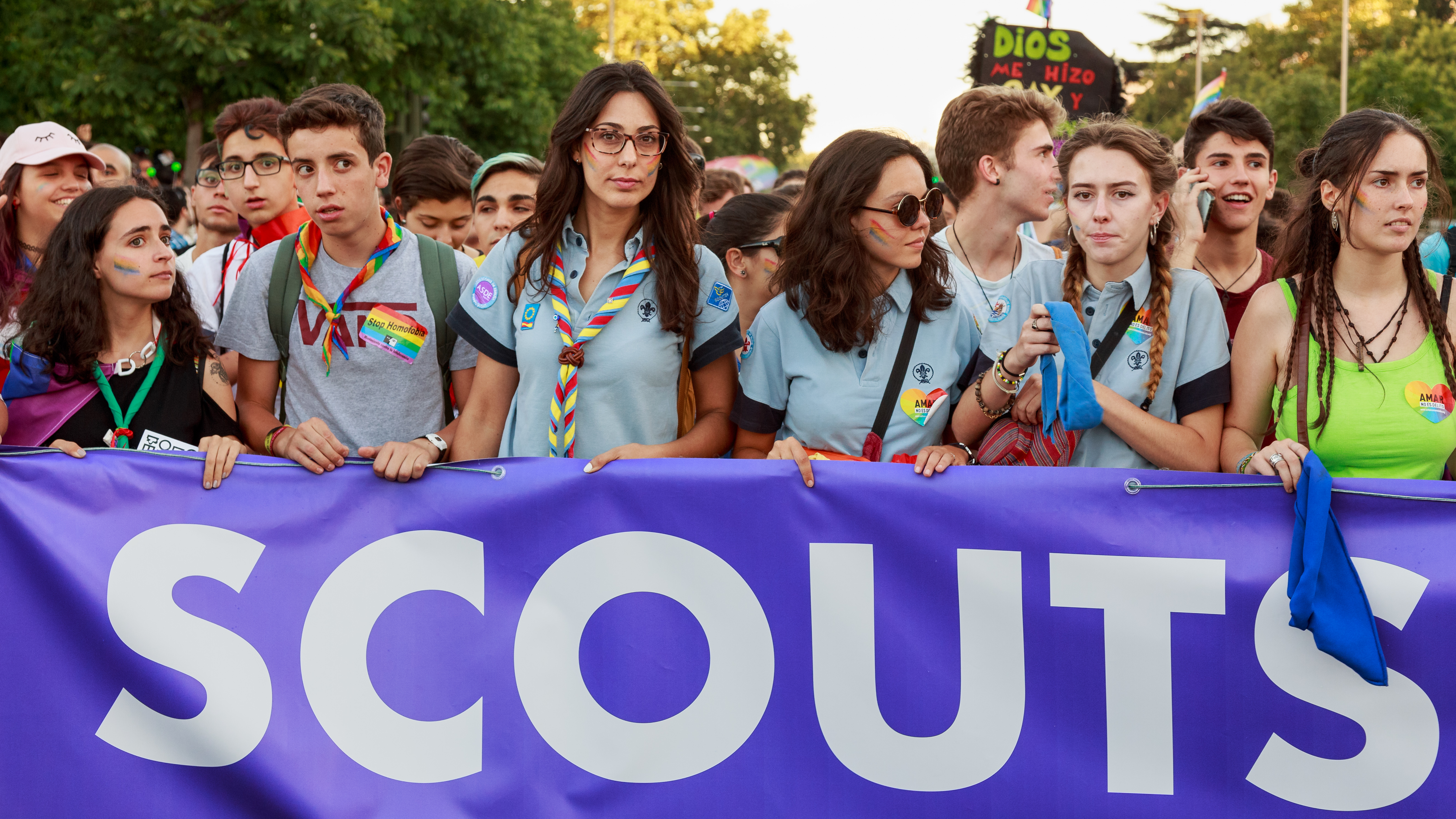
Spanish Scouts marching in Madrid for LGBT rights during the WorldPride 2017 parade.

In the United States, up until July 2015, "avowed homosexuals" were not allowed to be adult leaders; the national administration of the Boy Scouts of America, the country's only WOSM member, no longer believes that homosexual leaders prevent Scouting from reflecting traditional family values. The Girl Scouts of the USA, by contrast, maintain a "don't ask, don't tell" policy. Homosexual people are not restricted from membership or leadership positions in Scouts Canada, the Baden-Powell Service Association in the United States, Scouts Australia.

Publicist James Dale was expelled from his position as assistant Scoutmaster shortly after coming out.

Lee Walzer argued that the BSA policy is unfair, and in July 2015, the organization changed partially as a result of his arguments. Although he does not challenge the BSA rights regarding "a prospective leader presents himself as a role model inconsistent with Boy Scouting's understanding of the Scout Oath and Law", he rejects the notion that being openly gay makes a man a bad role model for Boy Scouts.

Most European associations do not restrict from membership or leadership positions people from the LGBT collective, including The Scout Association of the United Kingdom, Ring deutscher Pfadfinderverbände of Germany (German Scout Federation), and the Swedish Guide and Scout Association. Some associations completely embrace the LGBT collective as part of the true meaning of the Scout Movement and the 4th Scout Law (A Scout is Friendly and a Brother to Other Scouts), such as the Federación de Asociaciones de Scouts de España (ASDE) of Spain (Federation of Spanish Scouts/Explorers) and Scouting Nederland. The code of honor of Germany's Bund der Pfadfinderinnen und Pfadfinder includes a commitment to respect friendships, homosexual just as heterosexual relationships.

=== United States ===
The Boy Scouts of America, the largest youth organization in the United States, has policies which prohibit atheists and agnostics, and formerly had policies that prohibited known or "avowed homosexuals" from membership in its Scouting program. Before the policy change on homosexuality, both youths and adults have had their memberships revoked as a result. Before the policy change, the BSA contended that these policies were essential in its mission to instill in young people the values of the Scout Oath and Law. Until recently the BSA also prohibited girls from participating in two of its programs (Cub Scouting and Boy Scouting). These policies are controversial and are considered by some to be discriminatory.

The organization's legal right to have these policies has been upheld repeatedly by both state and federal courts. In 2000, the Supreme Court of the United States, in its Boy Scouts of America v. Dale decision, affirmed that as a private organization, the BSA can set its own membership standards. The policy disputes led to litigation over the terms under which the BSA can access governmental resources including public lands.

On May 23, 2013, The Boy Scouts of America's national governing body voted to rescind the long-standing ban on openly homosexual youth in the program. Effective January 1, 2014, "No youth may be denied membership in the Boy Scouts of America on the basis of sexual orientation or preference alone."

In September 2013, a new group called Trail Life USA was created with a rule of not admitting openly gay youth. This new program is not affiliated by the Boy Scouts of America nor recognized as an official Scouting program. In September 2013, some Baptist congregations, as well as churches from other Christian denominations, replaced their Boy Scouts of America Troops with those of the Trail Life USA program.

== World Organization of the Scout Movement ==
The World Organization of the Scout Movement (WOSM) has a membership of 155 National Scout Organizations with more than 28 million individuals. Only one national Scouting organization per country is recognized by WOSM. In some countries the National Scout Organization is a federation composed of more than one Scout association. The groups represented by a federation are sometimes divided on the basis of religion (e.g., Denmark and France), ethnicity (e.g., Bosnia and Israel), or native language (e.g., Belgium).

WOSM requires member National Scout Organizations to reference "duty to God" in their Scout Promises (see WOSM Scout Promise requirements). This requirement causes difficulties for atheists and agnostics seeking Scouting membership.

=== Eurasian Scout Region ===
There is some controversy because several members of the Eurasian Scout Region's top hierarchy are former Pioneer leaders. The primary goal of the Pioneers, whose membership was nearly compulsory, was the indoctrination of youth into communism. To complicate matters, these organizations adopted many of the trappings of the Scout organizations they supplanted. Because of the negative experience with the communist youth organizations, Scouting in the Eurasian Region is having a slow rebirth. Proponents see the inheritance of Pioneer work and properties in a positive light. Opponents have seen the Eurasian Region as a tool that would allow former Pioneers to keep their influence over post Soviet youth movements, and use their newfound connections outside the region for their own gain. Even the placement of the Regional headquarters at the historic Pioneer Camp Artek at Yalta appears to many to point to this Pioneer dominance. Opponents also question the fact that authoritarian Belarus was a member of the World Organization of the Scout Movement, against WOSM's stated guidelines, while democratic neighbor Ukraine is not a WOSM member. In the years following its creation, the Eurasian Region was considered by some to have stagnated in its purpose: among other things, the official website was not updated between 2004 and February 2006.

Alternate solutions proposed at the time of the Soviet breakup, and still considered viable options by the critics of the Eurasian Region, would be to divide the Region into the previously existing European, Asia-Pacific, or Arab Scout Regions, along cultural lines and national preference, to provide Scouts fresh perspective. As the Baltic states-Estonia, Lithuania and Latvia-have joined the European Region, there is precedence for this solution. In addition, there is no corresponding Eurasian Region for the World Association of Girl Guides and Girl Scouts, the republics are divided geographically between WAGGGS' Europe Region and Asia Pacific Region. Besides their shared tsarist and Soviet past, the 12 members of the Eurasian Region have little in common. Some, like Armenia and Azerbaijan, have waged war on each other, some like Georgia and Ukraine, allow open opposition, while others, like Belarus and Turkmenistan, have turned to authoritarianism reminiscent of Soviet times. Further, as none of the republics have had their Scout movements returned for much more than a decade, it is viewed that they would benefit from the expertise of the neighboring Scout associations in those Regions.

== Other Scouting organization conflict ==
Scouting organizations have been involved in other types of conflict and controversy both internally and externally.

=== Canada ===
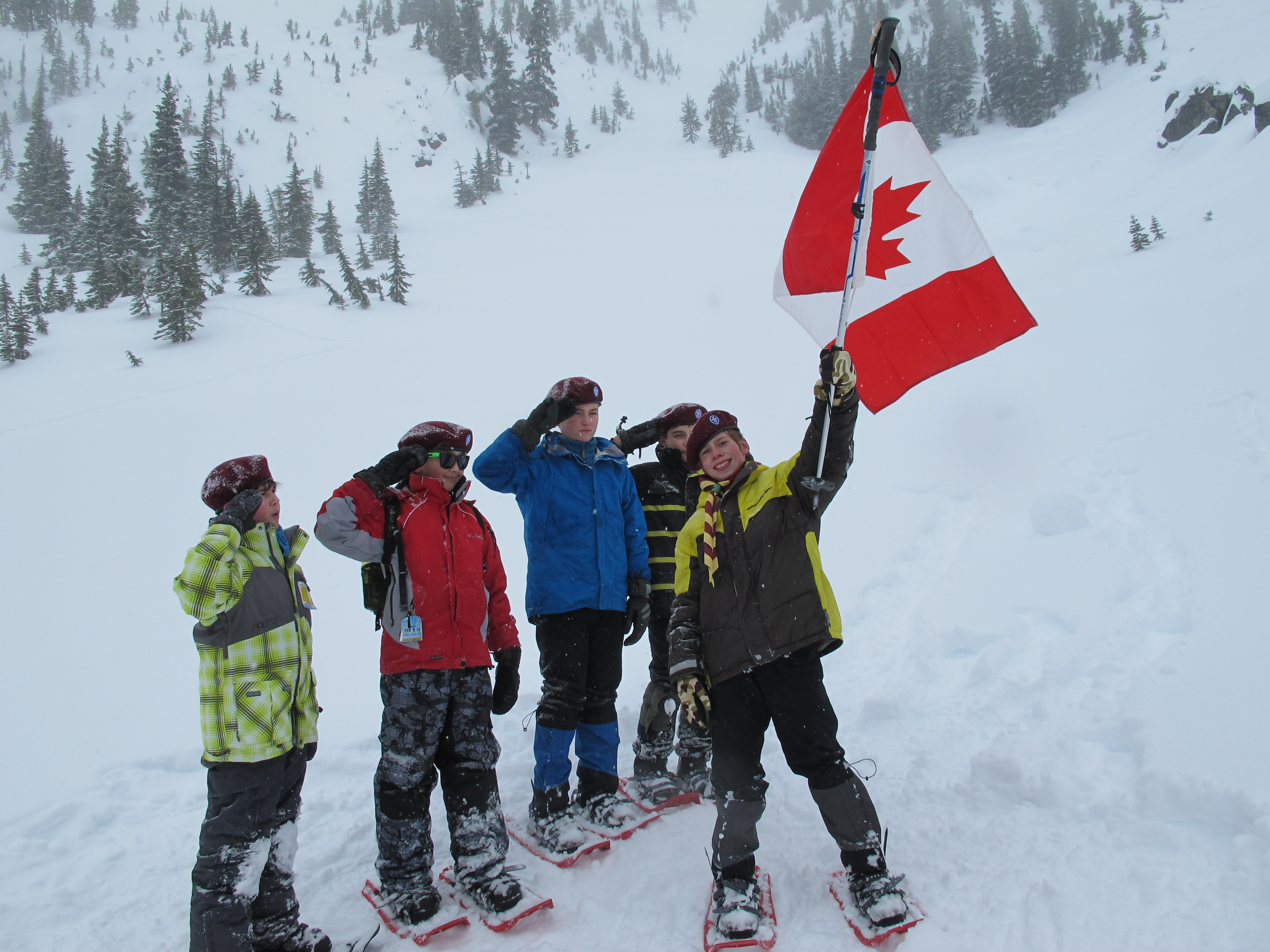
Canadian Scouts

Canada is the only country with more than one Scouting organization separately recognized by WOSM, Scouts Canada and Association des Scouts du Canada, which are divided by language.

Some members of Scouts Canada are upset with Scouts Canada's restructuring, including a loss of voting rights at the local level. In response, SCOUT eh! was founded in 2004, an organization consisting of "registered Scouts Canada members from across Canada dedicated to transforming Scouts Canada into a democratic association".

In 1998, the Baden-Powell Scouts of Canada (B-PSAC) were established in Canada, rejecting the modernization of the Scout method by WOSM and Scouts Canada. Scouts Canada challenged the association and successfully argued that the word "Scout", in the context of a youth organization in Canada, is a trademark held by Scouts Canada. Part of the 1999 action also attempted, unsuccessfully, to deny the B-PSAC permission to use Baden-Powell's name.

Scouts Canada refuse to recognise B-PSAC members as Scouts, stating of Scout associations that "every country has only one, that's how Baden Powell set up scouting", despite the fact that there are two WOSM recognised associations in Canada, and that Baden-Powell originally intended for Scouts Patrols to operate in a range of organisations.

The B-PSAC no longer use the title Scout, and have reformed as the Baden-Powell Service Association Federation of Canada. Scouts Canada continue to monitor the B-PSA, and will not allow their members to share resources, equipment or personnel with them.

== Militarism in early Scouting movement ==
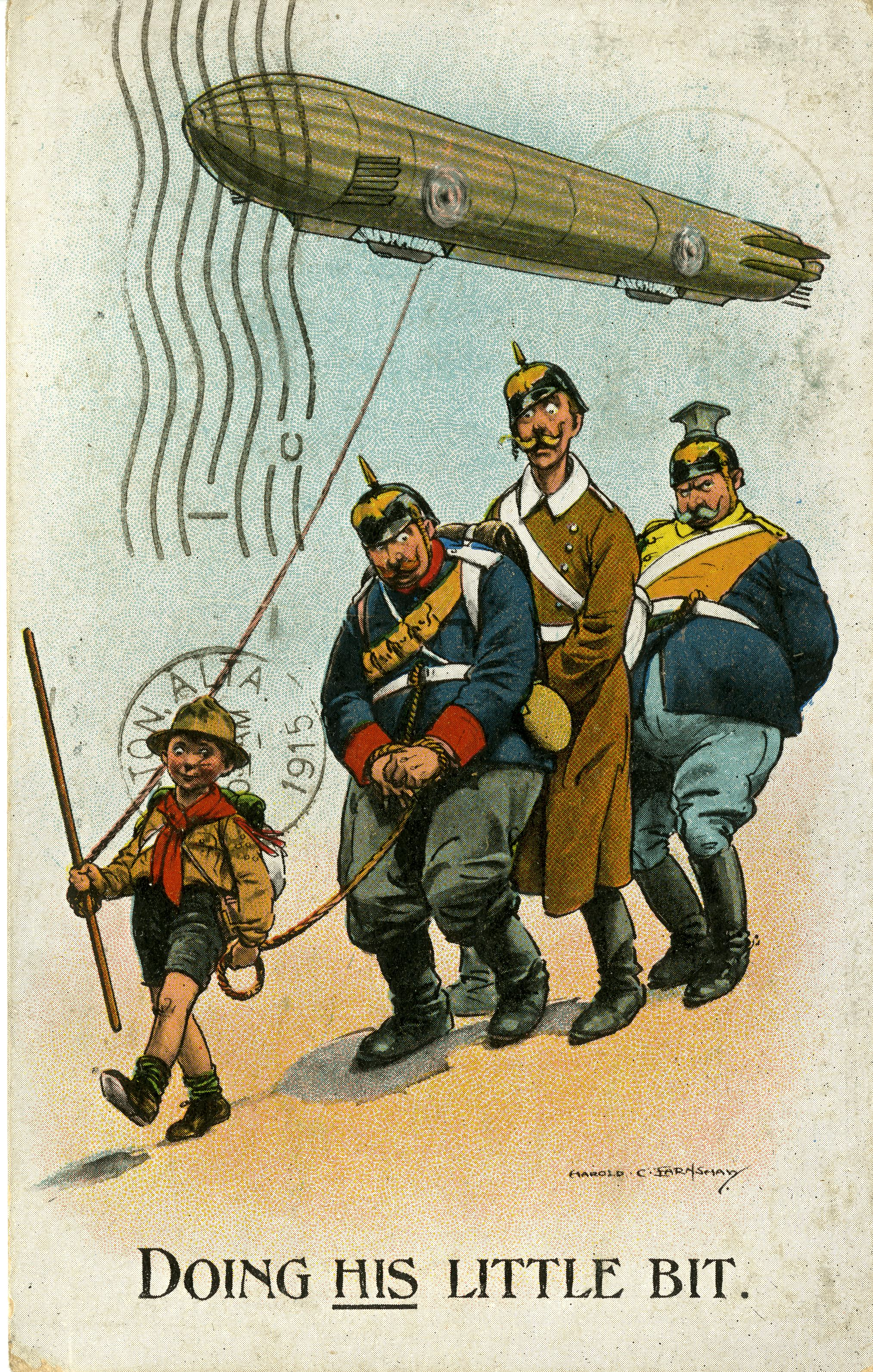
Propaganda postcard

Before the start of Scouting there was criticism about a possible military goal of Scouting. It culminated in a schism where Sir Francis Vane and Battersea Scout District formed the British Boy Scouts in 1909, partly due to a suspicion of a too close involvement with military organizations. Baden-Powell always strongly denied this.

- The base of Scouting, the book Scouting for Boys, was not a rewrite of the popular "Aids to Scouting", a small instruction book Baden-Powell wrote about military Scouting. Baden-Powell transferred only the techniques to non-military heroes: backwoodsman, explorers, sailors and airmen. "Scouting for Boys" has no military content.
- Some refer to a military hierarchy, but in contrary Scouting has an anti-authoritarian streak. The Patrol leader is a leader, but should originally be elected by members of the patrol. About the Scoutmaster Baden-Powell "stipulated that the position of Scoutmaster was to be neither that of a schoolmaster nor of a commander Officer, but rather that of an elder brother among his boys, not detached or above them individually". These are no military hierarchy.
- Baden-Powell did support the learning of rifle use, which even resulted in a few pages of instruction in "Scouting for Boys". This had however no military aim, but would be useful if boys really became frontiersmen by settling in the colonies, which Baden-Powell advertised.
- The uniform was and still is the strongest suggestion of a military Scouting. Baden-Powell gave three reasons for the uniform: the boys like it, it gives a group feeling and it covers differences in wealth. The first reason he explains as giving the boys a direct connection to their heroes, so as part of the theatrical side of the Scouting game. However, in reality, most of those heroes did not wear uniforms.

Despite the above, Baden-Powell announced in the Headquarters Gazette in November 1914 that he was forming the Scout Defence Corps. Although he stated that this was non-militaristic, the Corps was intended to provide boys able to do "whatever was necessary" in the event of a German invasion, with Scouts being mostly trained as general infantry. Officers of the Scout Training Corps were encouraged to have links with officers in the regular army, and were urged to use the War Office's 1914 'Infantry Training Manual' alongside Baden-Powell's 'Aids to Scouting'. The standards for the award of the Red Feather were laid out in a publication Marksmanship for Boys, written by Baden-Powell. The booklet included instruction in marksmanship and military drill, and concluded with a statement about changes in uniform that would take place should the Corps be accepted by the War Office, although this recognition was denied in March 1915.

The absence of many military aspects does not mean that Baden-Powell was anti-military. His efforts for peace became stronger in time, making him anti-war, but he disapproved of anti-militarism. He even did not see any harm in training in a military way. One reason for not using military items can be seen from his reaction to the Boys Brigade. It was the intention of Baden-Powell to make an attractive boys game and he thought that the military was not attractive enough. The second reason was that some parents would object military training, which would limit the reach of Scouting. There was probably another reason. The centre of his Scout method was individuality (opposite to the group), making own decisions (opposite to following the commander), doing good turns, self-learning (opposite to instruction by drill) and a game based on theatre and "make believe". These would never survive in a military scheme. Baden-Powell did use some parts of his profession which he found useful, like the uniform and some names, but these are always externals, rarely the essential fighting intention of military or specific military techniques.

== See also ==
- List of World Association of Girl Guides and Girl Scouts members
- List of World Organization of the Scout Movement members
- Scouting sex abuse cases

== Bibliography ==
- Baden-Powell, Robert (1919). Aids to Scoutmastership, World Brotherhood Edition (PDF). The National Council Boy Scouts of Canada. Archived from the original (PDF) on February 26, 2007.
- Baden-Powell, Robert (1915). Marksmanship for Boys (PDF). London: C. Arthur Pearson, LTD.
- Baden-Powell, Robert (1908). Scouting for Boys. Horace Cox.
- Baden-Powell, Robert (1926). Scouting for Boys. Horace Cox.
- Baden-Powell, Robert (1933). "10". Lessons from the Varsity of Life. Archived from the original on December 2, 2006.
- Jeal, Tim (1989). Baden-Powell. Hutchinson.
- Parsons, Timothy (2004). Race, Resistance, and the Boy Scout Movement in British Colonial Africa. Ohio University Press and Swallow Press. ISBN 978-0-8214-1595-5.
- Mills, Sarah (2012). "Duty to God/Dharma/Allah/Waheguru: Diverse youthful religiosities and the politics and performance of informal worship". Social & Cultural Geography. 13 (5): 481–499. doi:10.1080/14649365.2012.698749. S2CID 55559164.
- Schellenberg, Walter (2001). Invasion, 1940: The Nazi Invasion Plan for Britain. Little Brown Book Group. ISBN 0-9536151-3-8.
- Payne, Stanley G. (1996). A History of Fascism, 1914–1945. Routledge. ISBN 0203501322.
