= Scouting and Guiding in Portugal =

Scouting and Guiding associations in Portugal

The Scout and Guide movement in Portugal is served by several organizations:

- Federação Escotista de Portugal, member of the World Organization of the Scout Movement, a federation of:
  - Associação dos Escoteiros de Portugal (AEP)
  - Corpo Nacional de Escutas - Escutismo Católico Português (CNE)
- Associação Guias de Portugal (AGP), WAGGGS member.
- Associação das Guias e Escuteiros da Europa (AGEE; Guide and Scout Association of Europe), UIGSE member.
- Comité Português de Amizade dos Antigos Escoteiros e Guias (AEG) - member of International Scout and Guide Fellowship which includes
  - Fraternal Escotista de Portugal (FAEP; former members of AEP, and any other adults)
  - Associação de Antigas Guias (AAG; former Girl Guides)
  - Fraternidade de Nuno Álvares (FNA; former members of CNE)
- Associação Escoteiros Independentes da Moita (AEIM; non-aligned)
- União dos Escoteiros Portugueses (UEP; non-aligned, created after breakaway of AEP, but with former scouts of other Associations )

== International Scouting units in Portugal ==
The Transatlantic Council of the Boy Scouts of America serves American Boy Scouts in Lisbon and in the Azores.
