= Scouting and Guiding in São Tomé and Príncipe =

Scouting and Guiding associations in São Tomé and Príncipe

The Scout and Guide movement in São Tomé e Príncipe is served by

- the Associação dos Escuteiros de São Tomé e Príncipe, member of the World Organization of the Scout Movement
- the Associação Guias de São Tomé and Príncipe, association "working towards WAGGGS membership"
