= Oscar Palmquist =

Oscar Victor Palmquist Arias of Curitiba, Paraná, Brazil (born December 6, 1963 ) was one of 12 elected volunteer members of the World Scout Committee, the main executive body of the World Organization of the Scout Movement, Vice Chairman of the World Scout Conference "Curitiba-Brazil 2011" Organizing Committee and member of the International Relations Committee. He was elected at the 38th World Scout Conference in South Korea for a six-year term. Palmquist has acquired a wide experience covering 101 countries and five continents. In his job, Palmquist visits an average of 11 countries per year on several continents. As Member of the World Scout Committee and was the chairman of the MTF Membership review task force which allowed the World Scout Committee to recommend Palestine, Macao, Aruba and Curacao as WOSM members, and as Chairman of the Global Support Priority Area he created the Global Support concept and the GSAT Global Support Assessment Tool.

Palmquist joined Scouting in 1975 at the age of 11, and at 16 earned the Escoteiro da Pátria, comparable to the Eagle Scout rank in the Boy Scouts of America. He was twice President of the Brazilian Youth Forum, and was elected Vice-President of the Interamerican Youth Forum in Chile in 1980. In 1985, he received his Wood Badge and became a Wood Badge training director in 1987. In 1992, he was the youngest national board member ever elected, and in 1993 became Director for International Relations. From 1995 to 1998, Palmquist served as Vice-President of the União dos Escoteiros do Brasil. In 2000 he was elected a member of the Interamerican Scout Foundation Board of Trustees. He served as the International Commissioner for the Brazilian Scout Association from 1993 to 2007, and first Vice-Chairman of the Interamerican Scout Committee from 2004 to 2007. Palmquist worked on several projects such as the creation of the Comunidade do Escutismo Lusófono.

Palmquist was the Brazilian contingent leader to five World Scout Jamborees, and the contingent leader at three Pan-American Jamborees and the Centro-American Camporee.

He has been honored with more than 20 awards and medals from Brazil, Malaysia, South Korea, Asia Pacific, Portugal, Scotland, Mexico and Japan, including the gold Saint George's Cross in 1999, the Silver Eagle from Mexico in 2007, and the Tapir de Prata medal (the highest Scouting award of Brazil) in 2008. He was awarded the Mayor of the City of São Paulo Gold Medal for Community Services in 2006 and The Lusophonic Community Medal. After his term ended as World Scout Committee Member he became the 1st Vice President of UEB (Scouts Brazil) National Executive Board from 2015 to 2016.

In 1987 Palmquist graduated in Electronic Engineering at Pontifícia Universidade Católica in Porto Alegre, Brazil and in 2007 he finished his MBA at University of Redlands California, with emphasis in Global Business at Cambridge University in England. He also participated in seminars at IMD Business School from Lausanne Switzerland.

In 1993 Palmquist started work with Georg Fischer, located in Switzerland, was Vice President for all Latin American Operations, President of Georg Fischer Mexico, and business development for Shipbuilding. He worked with plastic piping systems for water treatment, gas distribution, life sciences, automotive, and semiconductors. In 2008 Oscar Palmquist became the Senior Vice-President for the Americas of Simona AG Plastics from Germany and in 2012 the General Manager for Plasson in Latin America.
