= Claudett de Jesus Ribeiro =

Brazilian geographer and public administrator

- Occupations: Geographer; Public administrator

Claudett de Jesus Ribeiro OMC is a Brazilian geographer and public administrator. In 2011, she was awarded the Ordem do Mérito Cultural.

== Early life and education ==
Ribeiro was born on May 21, 1940, in São Luís. Throughout her childhood she was an active participant in the Girl Guides, known in Brazil as Bandeirantismo. It was through her involvement in community education during this time that she discovered her loved for teaching. Ribeiro studied Geography and History, and subsequently taught in various schools in São Luís. She later studied law, but continued her work in education.

== Career ==
Ribeiro founded the Center for Afro-Brazilian studies at the Federal University of Maranhão (UFMA). She served as a consultant for UNICEF, for whom she helped develop educational programs in Maranhão and Piauí. In 2009, she served as the Secretary for Racial Equality for the Brazilian government.

On May 19, 2022, Ribeiro was awarded the first “Mãe Andresa” Medal in her home town of São Luís, Maranhão . This award, conferred by the São Luís City Council, recognizes the women of color who have made significant impacts for good in society.

Ribeiro taught for many years in the Department of Sociology and Anthropology at the Federal University of Maranhão.
