= Advancement and recognition in the Scout Association of Hong Kong =

progression of the badges

Advancement and recognition in the Scout Association of Hong Kong is a tradition dating from the inception of the Scouting movement. A fundamental purpose of advancement is the self-confidence a young man or woman acquires from his participation in Scouting. Advancement is one of the methods used in the "Aims of Scouting"– character development, citizenship training and personal fitness.

There are separate advancement and recognition programs for the four main program divisions: Cub Scout, Scout, Venture Scout, and Rover Scout. Each program is designed for its age group and goals.

The Scout Progressive Badge scheme is a scheme which assess Scouts. This scheme can reflect the overall ability of Scouting skills.

== Membership badge ==
This is a badge which is required for all Scouts 11 or above to earn higher progressive badges who understand and accept the Scout Law, Scout Promise, Scout Motto and ways to prevent from harm.

== Scout Pathfinder Award ==
Scout Pathfinder Badge is the second stage suitable for Scouts aged 11 or above and have a valid Membership Badge, and requires knowledge of Scoutcraft, first aid, safety, use of knots and hitches, leadership skill, and services.

== Scout Standard Award ==
Most Scouts will receive the third stage of thescheme that suitable for Scouts awarded the Scout Pathfinder Award or aged 13 or above who have completed the outdoor challenge in the Scout Pathfinder Award section, and requires abilities in camping, woodcraft, orienteering, physical and creative skills, leadership skill, services, international view, and new knowledges.

== Scout Advanced Award ==
The Scout Advanced Award is the fourth stage and the second to last stage of the scheme and it is suitable for Scouts that had awarded the Scout Standard Award or aged 14 or above who had completed the outdoor challenage in the Scout Standard Award section. It involves more cooking, boating, electronics, and community activities.

== Chief Scout's Award ==
This is the highest stage and suitable for Scouts that have awarded the Scout Advanced Award or aged 14 or above who had awarded Scout Advanced Award via completing all outdoor challenage from Scout Pathfinder Award, Scout Standard Award and the Scout Advanced Award. Every year several hundred Scouts attain this award. They will participate in the Scout Rally regardless of their troop. A unique feature at this award is an overnight camp, meteorology, as well meeting foreign Scouts for no less than 3 months.

== Proficiency badges ==
Proficiency badges are the stepping stone for any type of progressive badge scheme (besides Membership badge), all badges can be earned at any age.

=== Interest Badges ===
This is the most basic type of badge, most of they are hobby and can be granted by the Scout Leader or higher.

Angler	Archery	Artist	Athlete
Birdwatcher	Boulderer	Camp Cook	Campfire Host
Canoeist	Collector	Computer	Cyclist
Dragon Boatman	Footdrill	Geologist	Horseman
Kite Flyer	Librarian	Meteorologist	Model Maker
Musician	Naturalist	Park Orienteer	Petkeeper
Photographer	Rowing Boatman	Sailor	Smallholder
Stand Up Paddleboarder	Stand Up Paddling Polo	Swimmer	Tourism
Windsurfer

=== Pursuit Badges ===
This types of badges are obtainable by attending courses from the districts or regions. Those award are mostly skill based activity. These badges are only able to be issued by the District Badge Secretary or higher.

3D Printing Technician	Abseiler	Archery	Astronomer
Aviation Navigator	Backwoods Cook	Camper	Canoeist
Canoe Polo	Climer	Communicator	Cook
Craftsman	Data Analyst	Electronics	Explorer
Flight Simulator	Footdrill	Map Maker	Map Reader
Marksman	Master-at-arms	Mechanic	Meteorologist
Multimedia Designer	Navigator	Observer	Orienteer
Pioneer	Programmer	Sailor	Skin Diver
Skipper	Sportsman		Tree Carer

=== Service Badges ===
This type of badges are also only obtainable by attending courses from the districts or regions. All of them are service focused activity and they are only able to be issued by the District Badge Secretary or higher.

Animal Carer	Civics	Cybersecurity Analyst	Diversity & Inclusion Ambassador
Fireman	First Aider	Guide	Interpreter
Jobman	Lifesaver	Mental Health Ambassador	Nutritionist
Pilot	Public Health Ambassador	Quartermaster	Secretary
World Friendship Ambassador

=== Instructor Badges ===
This types of badges are only able to obtain after getting the standard version of that badge for 3 months or more. Obtaining this type badges usually by training courses along with helping other Scout to earn the standard version of the badge. This badge are only able to be issued by the District Badge Secretary or higher.

==== Interest Badges ====
Angler	Boulderer	Campfire Host	Cyclist
Model Maker	Photographer	Sailor	Swimmer

==== Pursuit Badges ====
Astronomer	Backwoods Cook	Camper	Communicator
Cook	Craftsman	Flight Simulator	Map Maker
Map Reader	Mechanic	Meteorologist	Multimedia Designer
Observer	Orienteer	Pioneer	Programmer
Tree Carer

==== Service Badges ====
Lifesaver
