= Associação de Escuteiros de Angola =

National Scouting organization of Angola

- Scout Association of Angola
- Country: Angola
- Founded: December 3, 1994
- Membership: 29,086
- Chefe Nacional: António Silvestre Alves Sardinha
- Affiliation: World Organization of the Scout Movement
- Website http://www.aeascout.com/

The Associação de Escuteiros de Angola (AEA, Scout Association of Angola), the national Scouting organization of Angola, was founded in 1994 and became a member of the World Organization of the Scout Movement on June 13, 1998, and was officially welcomed into WOSM at the World Scout Conference in South Africa in July 1999. The association is a member of the Comunidade do Escutismo Lusófono (Community of Lusophone Scouting).

The coeducational Associação de Escuteiros de Angola has 29,086 members as of 2021, in 54 groups spread over the country. Angola is the ninth and newest member of the Southern Zone of the Africa Region. Although Scouting is growing, the country is plagued by years of civil war and political unrest, and this is hindering development, especially in rural areas.

== History ==
Angolan Scouting was widespread in the colonial years, working closely with Portugal's Catholic Corpo Nacional de Escutas. When Angola gained its independence in 1975 and came under Marxist rule, Scouting was banned by that government. Scouting was officially started again in February 1991. In 1994, the interreligious Associação Nacional de Escuteiros and the Catholic Associação de Escuteiros Católicos de Angola merged forming the AEA. Today, Scouting includes an inter-religious pastoral commission which brings together the main religions represented by the members of the Scout Association.

== Program ==
=== Activities ===
Scouting enjoys special support from the Catholic Church and some groups are closely linked to the church, and excellent relations exist with UN agencies. Together with UNICEF, Scouting has been in the forefront of the campaign for children's immunization against polio. Scouting activities focus on improving the quality of life in local communities. These include humanitarian assistance to those who have fled armed conflict, working with UNICEF on Oral Rehydration Therapy programs, and an anti-polio campaign led by the Ministry of Health.

=== Sections ===
The association is divided in four sections according to age:

- Lobitos/Lobitas (Cub Scouts) - ages 7 to 10
- Exploradores/Júniores (Explorers/Junior Scouts) - ages 10 to 14
- Pioneiros/Séniores (Pioneers/Senior Scouts) - ages 15 to 18
- Caminheiros (Rover Scouts) - ages 18 to 22

=== Ideals ===
==== Cub Scout section ====
Cub Scout Law

- O Lobito escuta "Aquelá"
- O Lobito não se escuta a si próprio

Cub Scout Motto

Da melhor vontade

==== Scout section ====
Scout Law

- A Honra do Escuta inspira confiança.
- O Escuta é Leal.
- O Escuta é útil e pratica diariamente uma boa acção.
- O Escuta é amigo de todos e irmão de todos os outros Escutas.
- O Escuta é delicado e respeitador.
- O Escuta protege as plantas e os animais.
- O Escuta é obediente.
- O Escuta tem sempre boa disposição de espírito.
- O Escuta é sóbrio, económico e respeitador do bem alheio.
- O Escuta é puro nos pensamentos, nas palavras e nas acções.

Scout Promise

Prometo, pela minha honra e com a graça de Deus, fazer todo o possível por:
Cumprir os meus deveres para com Deus, a Igreja e a Pátria;
Auxiliar o meu semelhante em todas as circunstâncias;
Obedecer à Lei do Escuta.
