= Scouting and Guiding in Guinea-Bissau =

Scouting and Guiding organizations in Guinea-Bissau

The Scout and Guide movement in Guinea-Bissau is served by

- Escuteiros da Guiné-Bissau, member of the World Organization of the Scout Movement; originating from a merger of Corpo Nacional de Escutas da Guiné-Bissau and Organização dos Escuteiros da Guiné-Bissau in 2016
- Federacao Dos Escoteiros Tradicionais - FET, member World Organization of Independent Scouts
