= Scouts of China =

Scouting association of the Republic of China (Taiwan)

- Scout Of China (Taiwan)
- Headquarters: Hall of the Scouts of China
- Location: Zhongshan District, Taipei
- Country: Republic of China (Taiwan)
- Founded: February 25, 1912 (Mainland); 1950 (Re-established in Taiwan)
- Founder: Yen Chia-lin
- Membership: 53,972 (2021)
- Chief Scout: President Lai Ching-Te
- Chairman and Chief Commissioner: Lin, Min-Yu (林明裕)
- Affiliation: World Organization of the Scout Movement
- Website www.scout.org.tw

Scouts of China
- Traditional Chinese: 中華民國童軍
Transcriptions
Standard Mandarin
- Hanyu Pinyin: Zhōnghuámínguó Tóngjūn

The General Association of the Scouts of China (Taiwan)
- Traditional Chinese: 中華民國童軍總會
Transcriptions
Standard Mandarin
- Hanyu Pinyin: Zhōnghuá mínguó tóng jūn zǒng huì

The Scouts of China or the General Association of the Scouts of China (Taiwan) in full, is the National Scouting Organization (NSO) of the Republic of China (Taiwan) and represents the Scouting organization in Taiwan. It is a member of the World Organization of the Scout Movement since 1937. In 2021, the Scouts of China had 53,972 members.

== History ==
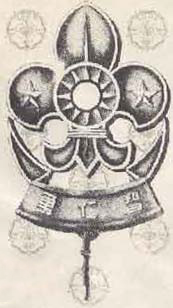
The historic membership badge of the General Association of the Scouts of China incorporated the Blue Sky with a White Sun.

=== Mainland China (1912–1949) ===
Following the birth of the Republic of China, the first Scout troop was organized by Reverend Yen Chia-lin in Wuchang on February 25, 1912, and the Scouting movement spread rapidly all over the country.

The General Association of the Scouts of China was formally established in Nanking, the former capital of the Republic of China in 1934, and became a member of the International Scout Bureau in 1937. Many Scouts actively participated in the Second Sino-Japanese War from 1937 to 1945.

There were 570,000 registered members in 1941.

Japanese military authorities did not consistently encourage the Scouting movement in occupied territories. Where local conditions were favorable, authorities would permit local Scouting or introduce Japanese-style Scouting, or Shōnendan, and sometimes even made this compulsory. On the other hand, where conditions were not favorable, and anti-Japanese sentiments were likely to be nurtured through Scouting, the authorities would prohibit it entirely. Taiwan was a colony of the Empire of Japan from 1895 until 1945, and Taiwan Boy Scouts/Shōnendan and other forms of pro-Japanese youth education had been introduced. Conversely, a number of Taiwanese boys were formed into a Shōnendan-style boy corps called Taiwan Shaoniantuan from 1939 through the 1940s to assist in Chinese resistance in the Second Sino-Japanese War.

=== Scouts of China in Taiwan (1945–) ===
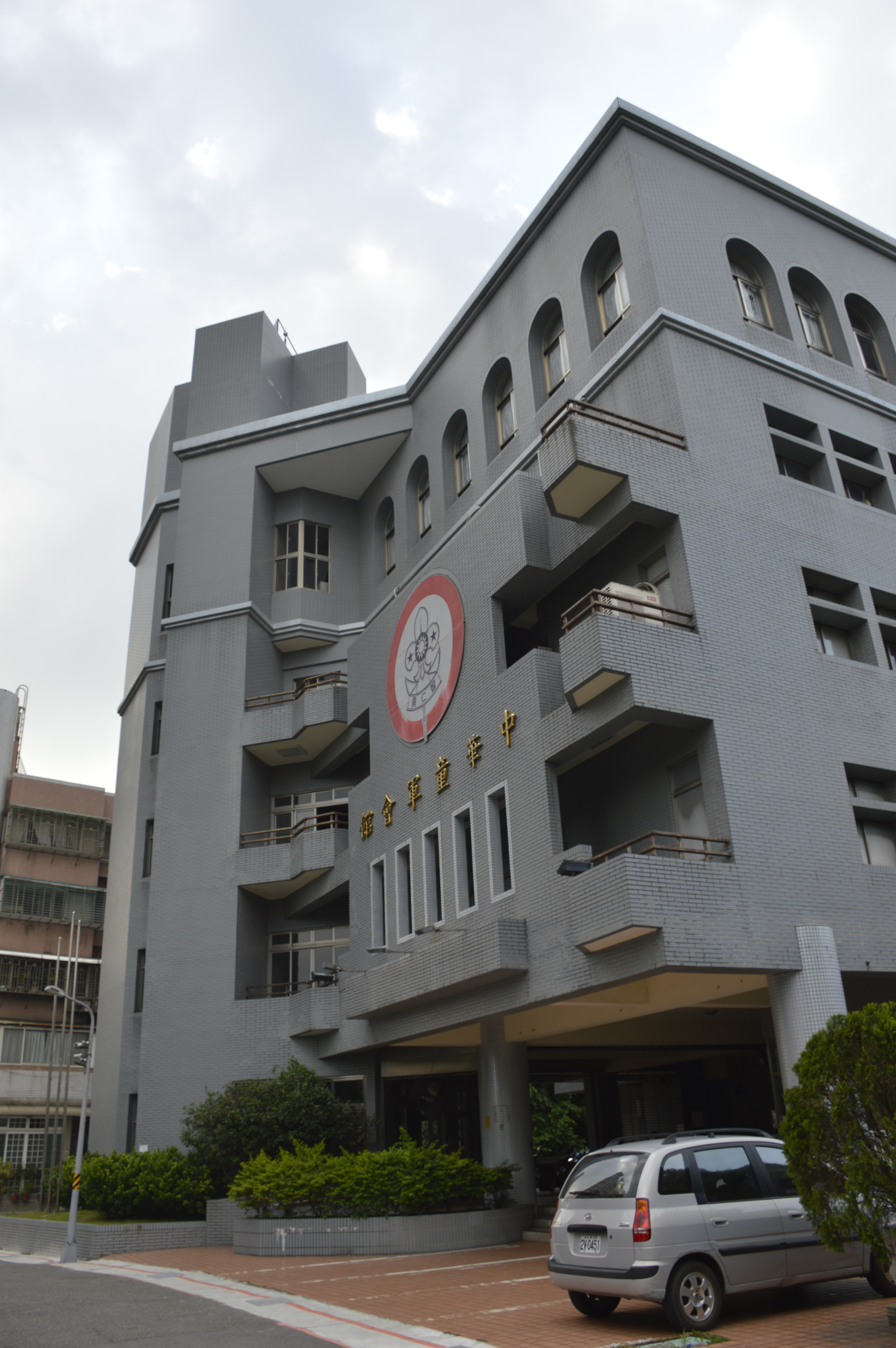
Hall of the Scouts of China in Zhongshan District, Taipei is the headquarters of the Scouts of China

In 1945, Chinese administration of Taiwan began. A few years later, in 1949 the ROC government relocated to Taiwan, where it remains today. However, Scouting has continued in Taiwan to this day under the name Scouts of China.

== Program ==
National Flower Class badge

There are five programs or sections in the Scouts of China. They are Beaver Scout (稚齡童軍), Cub Scout (幼童軍), Scout (童軍), Senior Scout (行義童軍) and Rover Scout (羅浮童軍).

Beaver Scout is served for the children aged 6 to 8 including three ranks: Star (星星), Moon (月亮) and Sun (太陽).

Cub Scout is served for the children aged 8 to 12 including four ranks: Anor now, Scouts of China are promoting the development of Sea Scouts.

== Individual representation and recognition ==
Nine Taiwanese Scouts have been awarded World Scouting's only award, the Bronze Wolf Award by the World Scout Committee, Chuan Kai Teng (1974), You-hwa Shieh (1976), Chung-Shin Chen (1982), Dr Ming-Huey Kao (1987), Teh-Li Tsui (1990), Chih-Yun Liu (1995), Shoei-Yun Wu (1996), Shou-Po Chao (2003), and Dr. Ie Bin Lian (2025).

== World Scout Moot ==
TGASC hosted the 12th World Scout Moot in Hualien in 2004. It will host the 17th edition in Tainan in 2029.

== See also ==
- Scouting and Guiding in mainland China
- The Scout Association of Hong Kong
- The Scout Association of Macau
- Girl Scouts of Taiwan
- Sun Li-jen
- Yang Huimin
- World Buddhist Scout Brotherhood
