= Associação dos Escuteiros de Cabo Verde =

National Scouting organization of Cape Verde

- Scout Association of Cape Verde
- Country: Cape Verde
- Founded: 1990
- Membership: 372
- Chief Commissioner: Luis Miguel Delgado
- Affiliation: World Organization of the Scout Movement

The Associação dos Escuteiros de Cabo Verde, the national Scouting organization of Cape Verde, was founded in 1990, and became a member of the World Organization of the Scout Movement in 2002. The Associação dos Escuteiros de Cabo Verde has 372 members as of 2021.

The association is a member of the Comunidade do Escutismo Lusófono (Community of Lusophone Scouting).

== Program and ideals ==
- O escuta orgulha-se da sua Fé e por ela orienta toda a sua vida.
- O Escuta é filho de Cabo Verde e bom cidadão.
- O dever do Escuta começa em casa.

The Scout Motto is Alerta, Alert in Portuguese.

== Officers ==
- Chief Commissioner: Luis Miguel Delgado
- International Commissioner: Anne Marie Monteiro
