= Associação Guias de São Tomé and Príncipe =

- Country: São Tomé and Príncipe
- Founded: 1991
- Governing body: World Association of Girl Guides and Girl Scouts

Associação Guias de São Tomé and Príncipe are a prospective member of the World Association of Girl Guides and Girl Scouts. Girl Guiding started in 1991, but no recent information appears to be available.

In 1999, the Associação Guias de Portugal held the first encampment for Ramos Adventurer and Caravel patrol leaders and deputies in Belmonte. This camp was also attended by Mozambique Guides and Guides from São Tomé and Príncipe.

== See also ==
- Associação dos Escuteiros de São Tomé e Príncipe
