= Corpo Nacional de Escutas da Guiné-Bissau =

National Catholic Scouting organization of Guinea-Bissau

- National Scout Corps of Guinea-Bissau
- Country: Guinea-Bissau
- Founded: November 25, 1966
- Membership: 1,500

The Corpo Nacional de Escutas da Guiné-Bissau (CNE-GB; roughly National Scout Corps of Guinea-Bissau) was the national Catholic Scouting organization of Guinea-Bissau.

The co-educational association served about 1,500 members in 2007. It was a member of the Comunidade do Escutismo Lusófono (Community of Lusophone Scouting). The national campsite is situated at Quinhámel.

pre-independence Associação de Escoteiros de Guiné Portuguesa

The CNE-GB was founded on November 25, 1966; after 1974 it was replaced by the Juventude Africano Amílcar Cabral. Scouting was one of several youth organizations made legal for free association by the constitution of 1991.

After fifteen months of preparation by a group of ten men and five women, seven of which were Scouts during the colonial period, and with an intensive orientation course by six Commissioners of the Corpo Nacional de Escutas de Portugal which took place in the parochial center between February 23 and February 27, 1993, the Bissau cathedral was the place of renovation of the CNE-GB for the first time after 27 years.

In 2016, the CNE-GB merged with the Organização dos Escuteiros da Guiné-Bissau, forming the Escuteiros da Guiné-Bissau, which became a member of the World Organization of the Scout Movement in 2017.
