= União dos Escoteiros do Brasil =

- national insignia
- Headquarters: Travessa Jose do Patrocínio 100, 80030-190 Curitiba, PR
- Country: Brazil
- Founded: 1924
- Membership: 100,022
- President: Irineu Resende
- Affiliation: World Organization of the Scout Movement
- Website http://www.escoteiros.org.br/

The União dos Escoteiros do Brasil (UEB, Union of Brazilian Scouts) is the national Scouting organization of Brazil. Scouting in Brazil was founded in 1910 and was among the charter members of the World Organization of the Scout Movement in 1922. The União dos Escoteiros do Brasil itself was founded in 1924; it has 62,990 members as of 2021. The association is a member of the Comunidade do Escutismo Lusófono (Community of Lusophone Scouting).

Scouting in Brazil is very popular in cities and suburban areas. Scouts from Brazil attend world and regional events in large numbers. They were well represented at the 1998 World Jamboree with 3,000 participants.

== Program ==
Logo of the organization

The association is divided in four sections according to age:

- Lobinhos/Lobinhas (Cub Scouts) - ages 6,5 to 10 - The highest rank is the Distintivo de Cruzeiro do Sul (Southern Cruise Badge)
- Escoteiros/Escoteiras (Boy Scouts/Girl Scouts) - ages 11 to 14 - The highest rank is the Distintivo de Escoteiro Lis de Ouro (Golden Lis Scout Badge)
- Seniores/Guias (Senior Scouts/Girl Guides) - ages 15 to 17 - The highest rank is the "Distintivo de Escoteiro da Pátria" (Homeland Scout Badge)
- Pioneiros/Pioneiras (Rover scouts) - ages 18 to 21 - The highest rank is the Insígnia de B-P (B-P Badge)

The UEB also has Sea Scout and Air Scout branches.

The Scout emblem incorporates elements of the coat of arms of Brazil.

=== Scout Motto ===
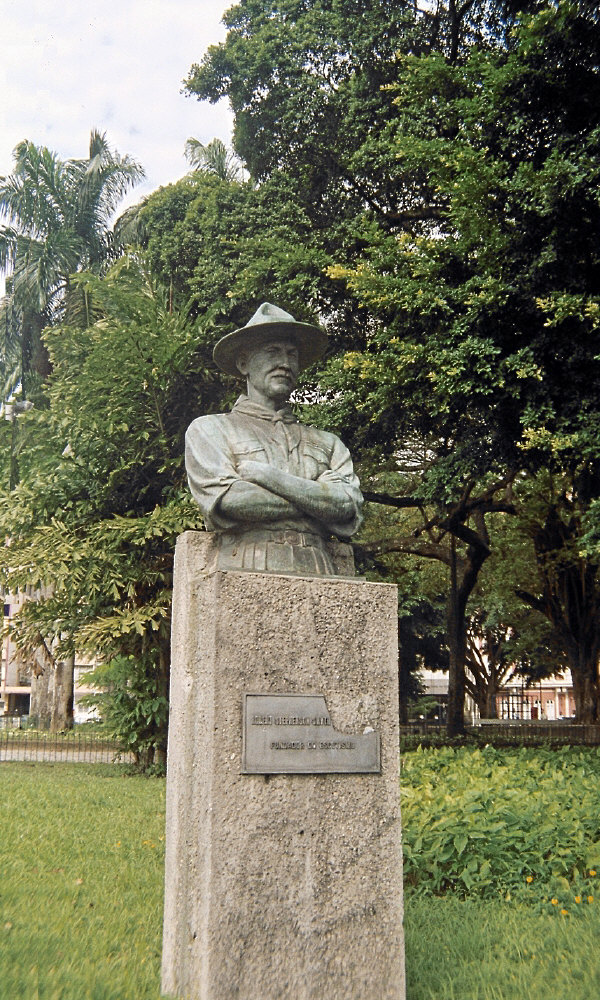
A statue of Baden-Powell in Rio de Janeiro honors the founder of Scouting

- Scouts, Seniors, and Rovers: Sempre Alerta (Be Prepared) Literal Translation: Always Alert
- Cubs: Melhor Possivel (Do your best) Literal Translation: The best possible

The Scout slogan is Estar sempre alerta para servir o melhor possível.

=== Scout Promise ===
Prometo pela minha honra fazer o melhor possível para:
Cumprir meus deveres para com Deus e minha Pátria;
Ajudar ao próximo em toda e qualquer ocasião;
Obedecer a Lei Escoteira.

I promise on my honor, to do my best:
To fulfill my duties to God and to my country;
To help my fellow man in any occasion;
To obey the Scout Law.

=== Cub Scout Promise ===
Prometo fazer o melhor possível para:
Cumprir meus deveres para com Deus e minha Pátria;
Obedecer à Lei do lobinho e;
fazer todos os dias uma boa ação.

I promise to do my best:
To fulfill my duties to God and to my country;
To obey the Cub Scout Law;
Every day do a good action

=== Scout Law ===
1. O Escoteiro é honrado e digno de confiança.
  A Scout is honorable and trustworthy.
2. O Escoteiro é leal.
  A Scout is loyal.
3. O Escoteiro está sempre alerta para ajudar o próximo e pratica diariamente uma boa ação.
  A Scout is always prepared to help his fellow man and practices a good turn every day.
4. O Escoteiro é amigo de todos e irmão dos demais Escoteiros.
  A Scout is a friend to everybody and a brother to every other Scout.
5. O Escoteiro é cortês.
  A Scout is courteous.
6. O Escoteiro é bom para os animais e as plantas.
  A Scout is good to animals and plants.
7. O Escoteiro é obediente e disciplinado.
  A Scout is obedient and orderly.
8. O Escoteiro é alegre e sorri nas dificuldades.
  A Scout is happy and smiles in difficulties.
9. O Escoteiro é econômico e respeita o bem alheio.
  A Scout is thrifty and respects the property of others.
10. O Escoteiro é limpo de corpo e alma.
  A Scout is clean in body and soul.

=== Cub Scout Law ===
1. O Lobinho ouve sempre os Velhos Lobos.
  The Cub Scout always hears the Leaders.
2. O Lobinho pensa primeiro nos outros.
  The Cub Scout thinks on the others first.
3. O Lobinho abre os olhos e os ouvidos.
  The Cub Scout opens the eyes and the ears.
4. O lobinho é limpo e está sempre alegre.
  The Cub Scout is clean and always happy.
5. O Lobinho diz sempre a verdade.
  The Cub Scout always says the truth.

== Princípios, Organizações e Regras (P.O.R) ==
The document titled "Principles, Organizations and Rules", or simply "P.O.R" is the document that rules over the conduct of scouting in Brazil. It has over 190 written rules that must be followed to achieve the main objective of Scouting, that is to teach the youth independence.

== See also ==
- Federação de Bandeirantes do Brasil
- Caio Vianna Martins
- Oscar Palmquist
