= Imperial Scout Exhibition =

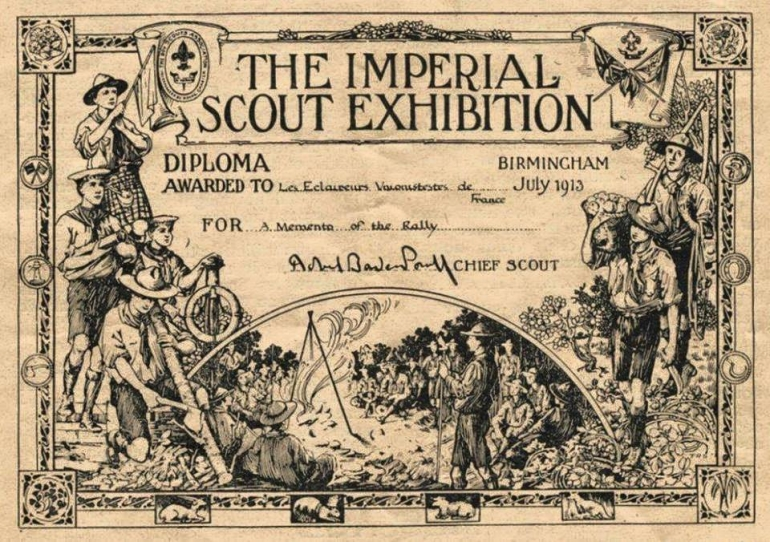
- Certificate signed by Baden-Powell
- Frequency: Annually
- Location: Handsworth Park
- Inaugurated: July 1913
- Attendance: 30,000

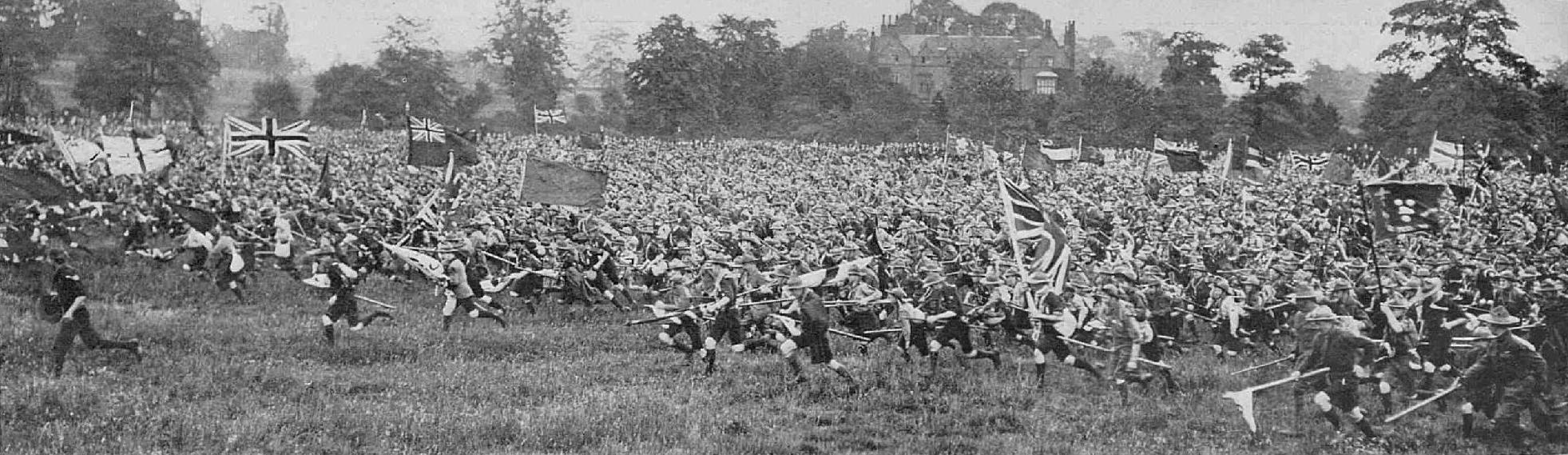
Scouts at the 1913 rally, in Perry Hall Park

The Imperial Scout Exhibition was the first International scout rally in Birmingham, a gathering of Boy Scouts held in July 1913, with an exhibition at Bingley Hall, opened by Princess Alexander of Teck, and events in Perry Hall Park (then in Staffordshire; part of Birmingham from 1928) attended by about 30,000 Scouts, in the presence of Prince Arthur of Connaught. A review of Sea Scouts took place at Edgbaston Reservoir.

The 1st Shanghai Troop of Baden-Powell Scouts attended, taking six weeks to arrive from Shanghai. There were also troops from Australia, South Africa, Canada, Gibraltar, the United States, France, Germany, Italy, Austria, Poland, Sweden, and Holland.

== Legacy ==
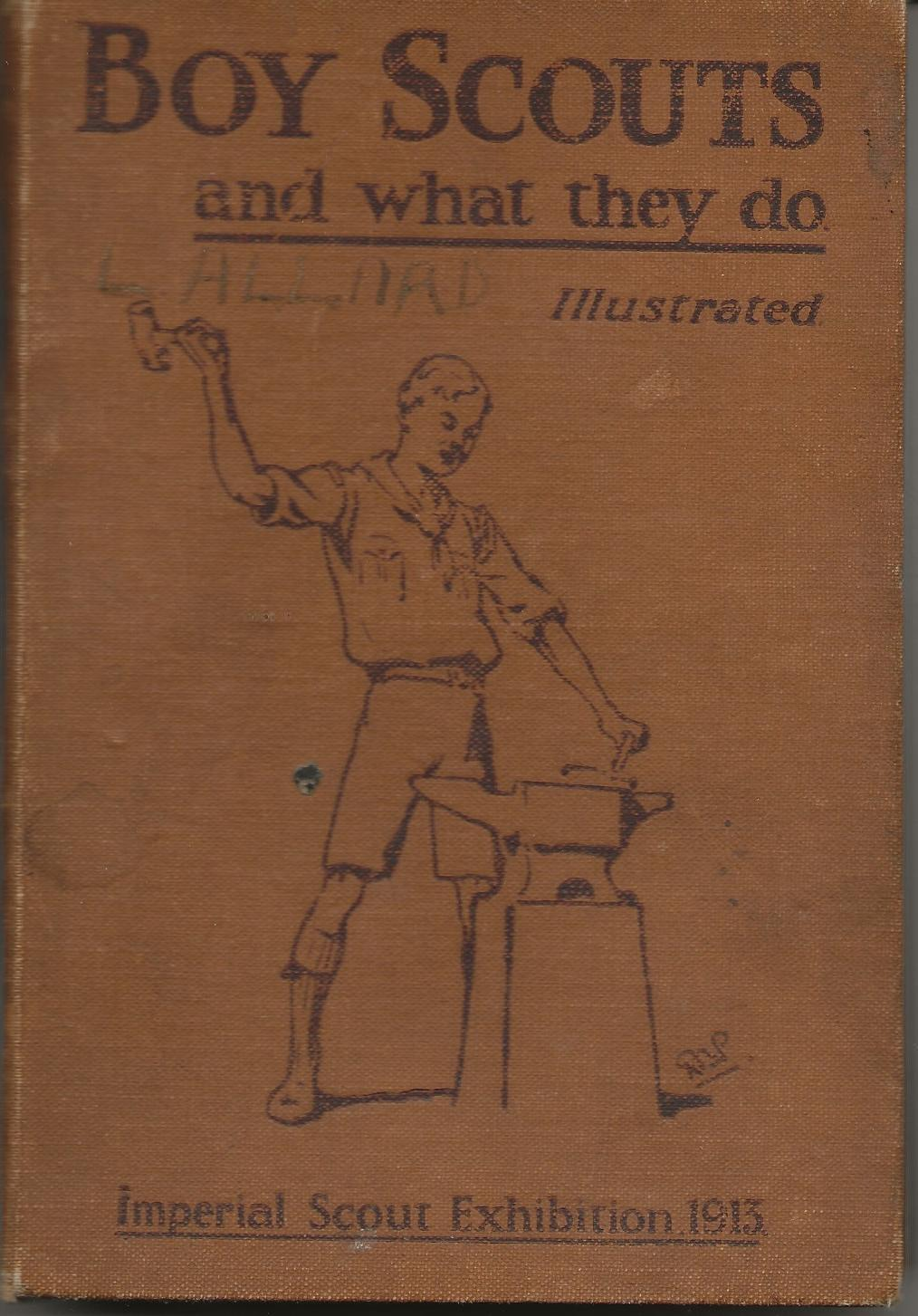
Cover of "Boy Scouts and What They Do"

An illustrated book about the events, "Boy Scouts and What They Do", was published later the same year, with an introduction by the Chief Scout, Robert Baden-Powell.

Handsworth Park has hosted a rally for many years when Scouts from a wide area congregated and paraded since the exhibition.
