= Federação Escotista de Portugal =

Portuguese Scouting federation

- Headquarters: Travessa das Galeotas, nº1
- Location: Lisbon
- Country: Portugal
- Founded: 1928
- Membership: 75,359
- President: alternates between the Chief Scouts of both associations
- Affiliation: World Organization of the Scout Movement
- Website www.fep-portugal.org

The Federação Escotista de Portugal (also Federação Escutista de Portugal; FEP, Scouting Federation of Portugal) is the national Scouting federation of Portugal. Scouting in Portugal started in 1911 and was among the founders of the World Organization of the Scout Movement in 1922. The present federation was founded in 1928. It serves 77,352 members of both sexes (as of 2022).

When Portuguese Scouting started in 1911, many associations appeared, however, only two of them survived: União dos Adueiros de Portugal (which became extinct in 1930) and the Associação dos Escoteiros de Portugal (AEP), still operational. The Corpo Nacional de Escutas - Escutismo Católico Português (CNE) is another Scouting organization that is active today. It was founded in 1923, and is sponsored by the Catholic Church. Today, there are also some organizations besides the CNE and the AEP, like the Associação Guias de Portugal (AGP), but they are not members of the federation.

The federation was host of Roverway 2003, a joint event of the European Scout Region and the WAGGGS-Europe Region. In 2025 it hosted the 16th World Scout Moot.

== Members ==
The federation has two members:

- Associação dos Escoteiros de Portugal (AEP, Scout Association of Portugal; interreligious, 13,000 members, coeducational)
- Corpo Nacional de Escutas (CNE, National Scout Corps; Catholic, 64,000 members, coeducational)

Note: The word Scouting has two different spellings in Portuguese: Escotismo is used by the AEP, Escutismo by the CNE.

== See also ==
- Scouting in Portugal
