= Caio Vianna Martins =

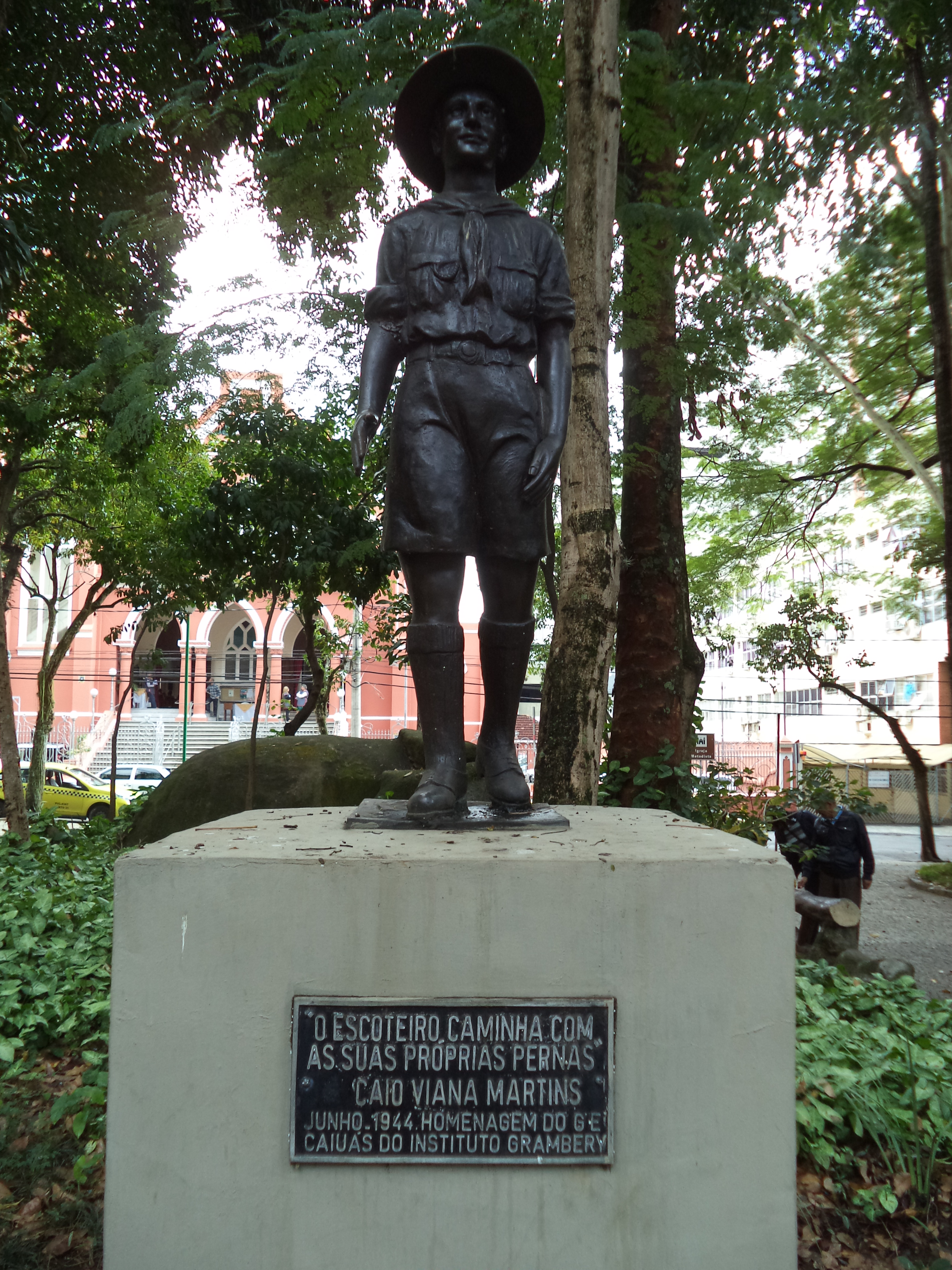
Statue of Caio Vianna Martins in Juiz de Fora, Brazil.

Caio Vianna Martins (1923–1938) is a famous Scout and a Brazilian national hero.

In the early hours of December 19, 1938, Martins was travelling with a group of Scouts from Belo Horizonte to São Paulo, when their passenger train collided head-on with a freight train near the city of Barbacena, resulting in many injuries and approximately 40 deaths. The Scouts worked through the night to assist the wounded until help began to arrive after dawn.

Martins was struck in the back during the collision and suffered internal injuries. When rescue workers arrived and began carrying the wounded to the city on stretchers, Martins refused, saying that there were many other wounded who needed assistance more than he, and that "A Scout walks on his own leg."

Accompanied by several friends, Martins walked to the city, but died of his injuries on December 20.

The Estádio Caio Martins football (soccer) stadium in Niterói, Rio de Janeiro state, Brazil is named in his honor.
