= Scout Association of the People's Republic of China =

Scout organization in China

The Scout Association of the People's Republic of China
- 中华人民共和国童军总会
- Headquarters: The Scout Association of the People's Republic of China
- Location: Beijing, Shanghai
- Country: People's Republic of China
- Founded: August 2008
- Chief Commissioner: Rover Ye
- Website; Scout of People's Republic of China

The People's Republic of China now has multiple and originally separate Scouting activities within its borders. The newly founded Scout Association of the People's Republic of China (Chinese: 中华人民共和国童军总会) serves Rover Scouts and Venture Scouts 15 years old and above in both genders. Registered units of this association are the Shanghai Scout, Rover Alpha Fujian Crew, Guangdong Rover, Rover "A" Jiangsu Crew. Scouts of this association took part in Jamboree on the Air and Jamboree on the Internet 2009 and the association issued several memorabilia for these events. In close connection with the Scout Association of the People's Republic of China is the Team Delta Rovers (中国三角洲成人童军队).

== History ==
=== Post-1949 ===
The Scouting Movement was banned by the Chinese Communist Party after it consolidated its power throughout the Mainland following its victory in the Chinese Civil War 1949. However, Scouting was re-introduced in Shanghai and Shanghai Scout Club (currently known as Shanghai Scout) was founded in December 2006. Many camps and training activities were organized. Scout Leaders were trained (base on Wood Badge Training Scheme provided by WOSM APR). In August 2008, the Scout Association of the People's Republic of China was officially founded. From there, the movement spread to other provinces. However, the organization is not officially supported by the government of China.

Currently, the movement has one National Council, two Regional Councils, four District Councils and nine Crews/Troop from four different Provinces (Fujian, Shanghai, Guangdong and Jiangsu).

== See also ==
- Scouting and Guiding in Mainland China
