= Associação dos Escuteiros de São Tomé e Príncipe =

National Scouting organization of São Tomé and Príncipe

- Scout Association of São Tomé and Príncipe
- Country: São Tomé and Príncipe
- Founded: 1993
- Membership: 421

The Associação dos Escuteiros de São Tomé e Príncipe (AESTP, roughly Scout Association of São Tomé and Príncipe) is the national Scouting organization of São Tomé and Príncipe. The organization was founded in 1993 and is affiliated to the World Organization of the Scout Movement (WOSM), since 11 May 2017. It is a member of the Comunidade do Escutismo Lusófono (Community of Lusophone Scouting). In 1995, the organization had 421 members.

Scouting was introduced to São Tomé and Príncipe in 1970, following the initiative of local priest Manuel Casinha, however this initial experiment did not continue, since the people involved had to leave to study abroad. After independence in 1975, there was no place for Scouting, and it was not until March 1993 that Scouting was revived through the initiative of the Catholic Church and Bishop Dom Abílio Ribas. In this initial phase, it benefited from the knowledge and action of young French Scout Christophe Desmet who was working on the island. AESTP has been legally registered since December 2011; the government has approved their initial constitution and they are now in process of recognition of a new version, as approved by the WOSM Constitution Committee.

São Tomé and Príncipe has issued postage stamps with Scouting motifs.

== See also ==
- Associação Guias de São Tomé and Príncipe
