= Comunidade do Escutismo Lusófono =

- Community of Lusophone Scouting
- Country: international
- Founded: August 6, 1995
- Membership: 5 member countries

The Comunidade do Escutismo Lusófono (CEL, Community of Lusophone Scouting) is the international community of Scouting organizations in the Lusophone countries. Its members are:

- Angola: Associação de Escuteiros de Angola
- Brazil: União dos Escoteiros do Brasil
- Cape Verde: Associação dos Escuteiros de Cabo Verde
- Mozambique: Liga dos Escuteiros de Moçambique
- Portugal: Federação Escotista de Portugal with the Associação dos Escoteiros de Portugal and the Corpo Nacional de Escutas - Escutismo Católico Português

The Grupo de Escuteiros Lusófonos de Macau in Macau is affiliated to the Corpo Nacional de Escutas. Lusophone Scouting organizations without membership in the CEL are the União Nacional dos Escuteiros de Timor Leste in East Timor, the Corpo Nacional de Escutas da Guiné-Bissau in Guinea-Bissau and the Associação de Escuteiros de São Tomé e Príncipe in São Tomé and Príncipe.

The CEL is based on the Carta do Escutismo Lusófono (Charter of Lusophone Scouting), formulated during the 18th World Scout Jamboree in Dronten, Netherlands on August 6, 1995. The original signatory organizations were the Corpo Nacional de Escutas - Escutismo Católico Português, the União dos Escoteiros do Brasil, the Corpo Nacional de Escutas da Guiné-Bissau and the Associação de Escuteiros de São Tomé e Príncipe.

Main aims of the CEL are the cooperation between its members, the admission of non-recognised Lusophone Scouting organizations to World Organization of the Scout Movement (WOSM) membership and the promotion of the Portuguese language as means of international communication.

Since 1995 the Scouting organizations of Angola, Cape Verde and Mozambique have become members of WOSM.
