= Yen Chia-lin =

Founder of Scouting in China

- 嚴家麟
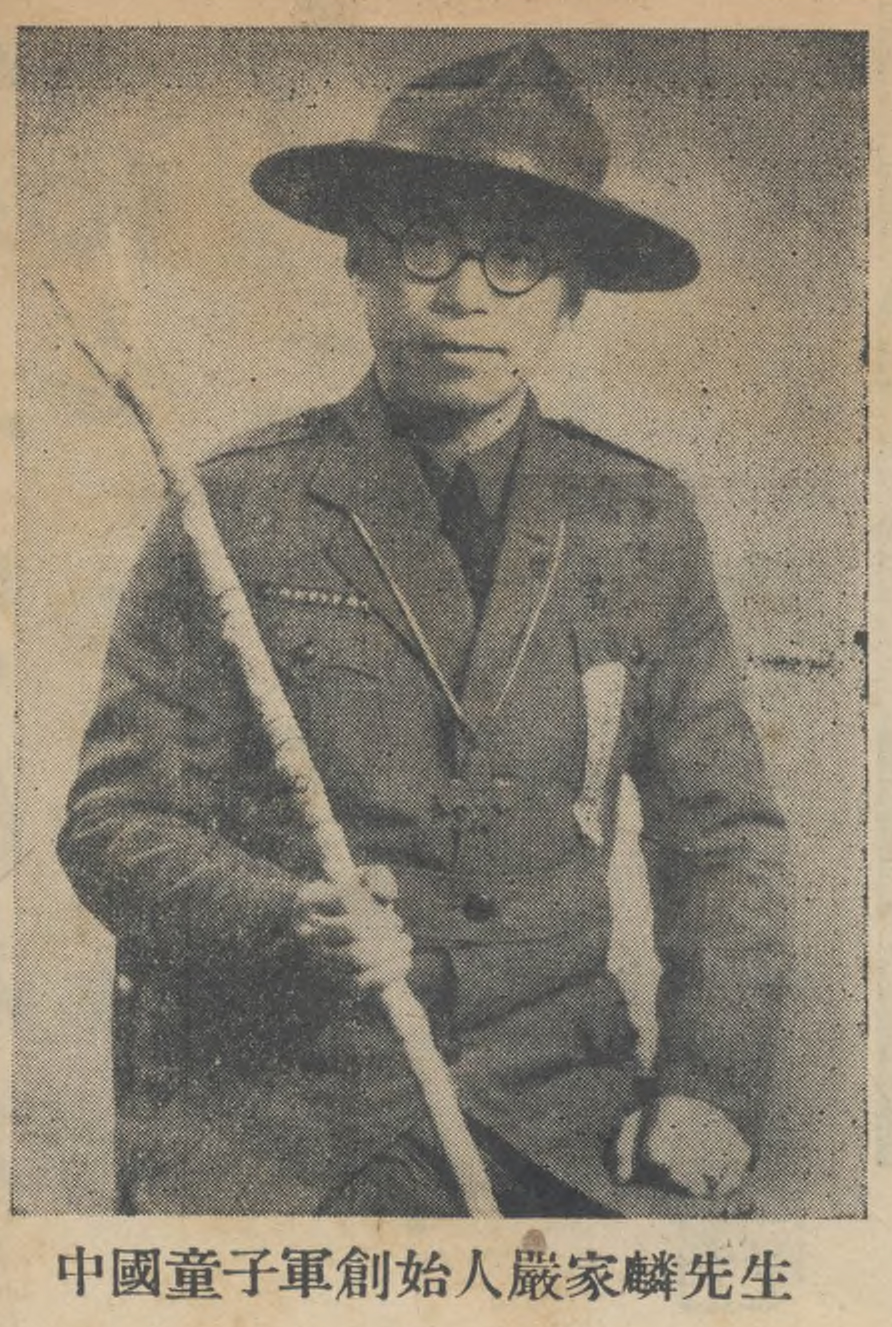
- Yen Chia-lin
- Born: 1890
- Died: 1967 (aged 76–77)
- Education: Boone University; Springfield College

Yen Chia-lin (Chinese: 嚴家麟; pinyin: Yán Jiālín), also known as Benjamin Yen (1890-1967), was the founder of Scouting in China. He studied at Boone University and became an ordained minister in 1916. He studied at Springfield College and graduated with a Master's Degree in 1926. He spent the next year as a special exchange student at the General Theological Seminary in New York. He returned to China in 1927 and served as the chaplain at St. Hilda's School. He served on the National Board of the General Association of the Scouts of China and the China YMCA. He later traveled to Washington, D.C. for the 1935 Boy Scout Jamboree with a group of Chinese boy scouts. The jamboree was canceled due to a polio outbreak and the scouts toured the United States. He also traveled to the Netherlands with a group of boy scouts for the 5th World Scout Jamboree in 1937.

Following the birth of the Republic of China, the first Scout troop was organized by Yen Chia-lin in Wuchang, Hubei on February 25, 1912 and the Scouting movement spread rapidly all over the country.
