= Federação de Bandeirantes do Brasil =

- Girl Guide Federation of Brazil
- Country: Brazil
- Founded: 1919
- Membership: 6,201
- National President: Maria Luiza Mury Alves
- Affiliation: World Association of Girl Guides and Girl Scouts
- Website www.bandeirantes.org.br

The Federação de Bandeirantes do Brasil (FBB, Girl Guide Federation of Brazil) is the national Guiding organization of Brazil. It serves 6,201 members as of 2003. Founded in 1919, the coeducational organization became a full member of the World Association of Girl Guides and Girl Scouts in 1930.

== Program and ideals ==
The association is divided in five sections according to age:

- Ciranda (Brownies) - ages 5 to 8
- B1 (Guides) - ages 9 to 11
- B2 (Guides) - ages 12 to 15
- Guia (Guides) - ages 15 to 21
- Leaders - ages 21 and older

The Girl Guide emblem incorporates the color scheme of the flag of Brazil.

The Brazilian Guide motto is "semper parata", Latin for "always prepared".

=== Guide Promise ===
I promise, on my honour, to do my best to:
Be loyal to God and my country,
Help other at any occasion and
Obey the Guiding Law.

=== Guide Law ===
A Guide...

1. Is trustworthy.
2. Is loyal and respects truth.
3. Helps others on all occasion.
4. Esteems and cherishes friendship.
5. Is kind and courteous.
6. Sees God in creation and protects nature.
7. Knows how to obey.
8. Faces all difficulties cheerfully.
9. Uses resources wisely.
10. Acts, thinks, and is coherent with moral values.

== See also ==
- União dos Escoteiros do Brasil
