= Scout Association of Macau =

Scouting organization in Macau

The Scout Association of Macau
- Portuguese: Associação de Escoteiros de Macau
- Chinese: 澳門童軍總會
- Country: Macau, China
- Founded: 12 December 1983
- Membership: ~5,000
- Chief Commissioner: Francisca Vong Kincheng 黃健清
- Affiliation: Asia-Pacific Region of the World Organization of the Scout Movement
- Website http://www.scout.org.mo/

The Associação de Escoteiros de Macau (Scout Association of Macau, Chinese: 澳門童軍總會) is the national Scouting association in Macau, China. It is an Associate Member of the Asia-Pacific Region of the World Organization of the Scout Movement, and became a Full Member of WOSM on 16 August 2017 during the 2017 World Scout Conference.

Scouting in Macau began in 1911 with Chinese and Portuguese Scout troops. Shortly after, Scouts from China and Portugal started their troops in various schools and communities. The Associação de Escoteiros de Macau was founded on 12 December 1983 with 200 members, revitalizing local Scouting after decades of dormancy. Facing the handover of Macau from Portuguese administration to China in December 1999, the future of Scouting in Macau seemed uncertain, but as a Special Administrative Region of the People's Republic of China, Macanese institutions are allowed to continue as before. On 20 December 1999, China resumed administration over Macau. The AEM revised the verses of the Scout Promise and the Cub Scout Promise, which were introduced at the annual Scouts Rally Day in 2000.

Macau Scouts visibly render services in charity and community activities including the Charity Walk for Millions, the Green Day, the 2005 East Asian Games, the 2007 Asian Indoor Games, as well as guiding voters in Macanese elections. In recognition, AEM was awarded the Outstanding Youth Organization Award in 1998 and the Medal of Philanthropic Merit in 2001. Macau has participated in numerous international events throughout Asia as well as Europe.

The Grupo Escuteiro Lusófono de Macau (Lusophone Scout Group of Macau) participates in the activities of the Comunidade do Escutismo Lusófono.

Catholic members participate in International Catholic Conference of Scouting activities.

== Program sections and ideals ==
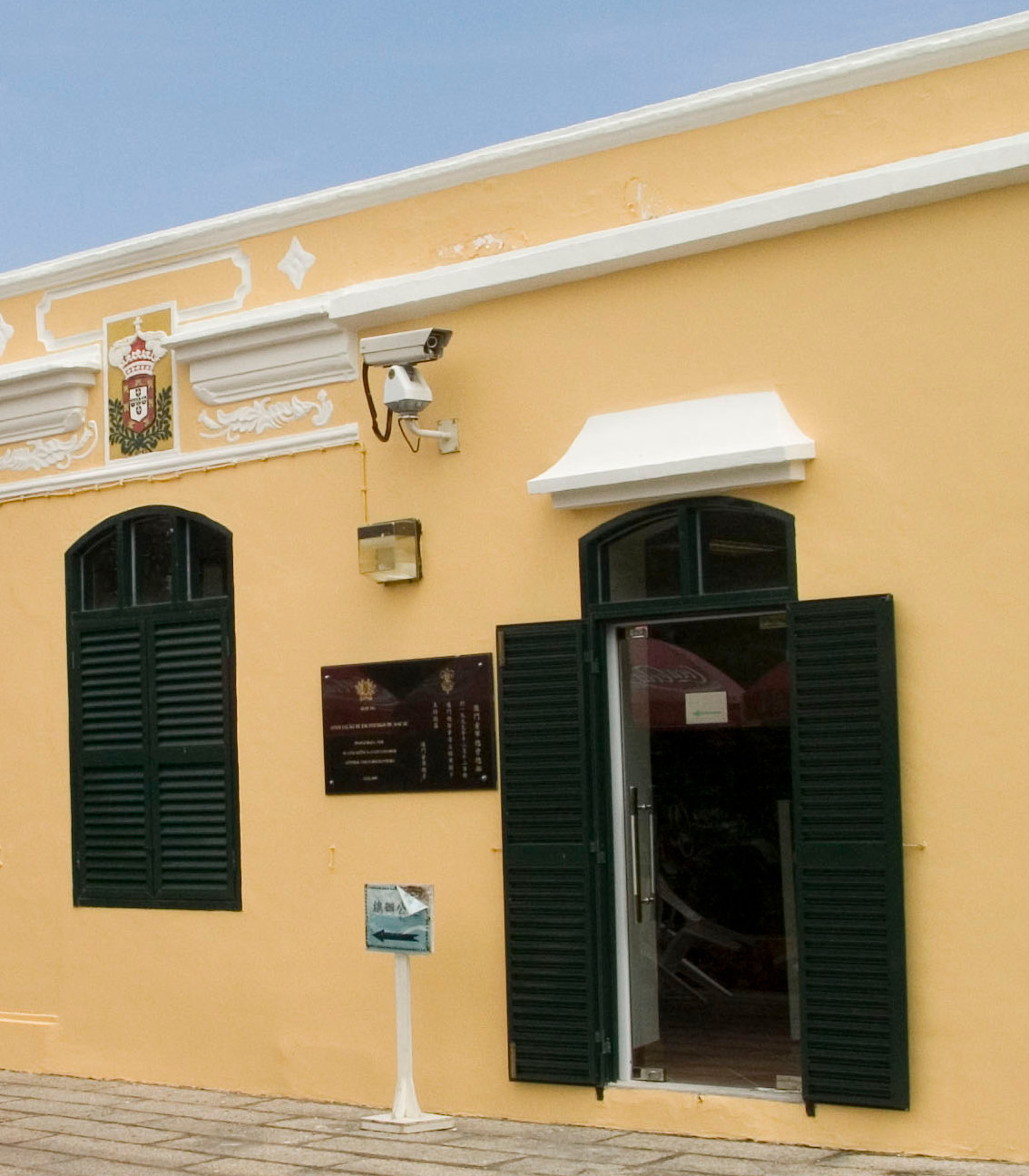
Memorial engraved stone tablet on the foundation of Scouting in Macau in Jardim Camoes

- Cub Scouts: 7 to 11
- Scouts: 12 to 15
- Rovers: 16 to 20

The Scout Motto is 隨時準備 in Chinese and Sempre Pronto in Portuguese.

=== Scout Oath ===
Chinese:

我謹以至誠宣誓：
對國家，對澳門，對信仰要負責；
對別人，要幫助；
對規律，要遵行。

Portuguese:

Prometo pela minha honra por amar e servir fielmente à minha religião e à minha terra, auxiliar o próximo, obedecer à Lei do Escoteiro.

English translation:

On my honour, I promise that I will do my best to my Country, to Macau, and to my religion, to help other people and to keep the Scout Law.

=== Leaders ===
Each Group is headed by a Group Scout Leader and assisted by an Assistant Group Scout Leader.

== Emblem ==
The emblem of the Scouting Association of Macau is based on Macau colonial past. A gold fleur-de-lis shared with the symbol of world Scouting movement. Within the fleur-de-lis is an escutcheon based on Macau's colonial coat of arms before 1999 (elements consisting of the five blue escutcheons from the coat of arms of Afonso I of Portugal, five green and white waves and a gold Chinese dragon on blue background holding a blue escutcheon from Afonso I of Portugal) The lower portions of the emblem is the Scouting motto: Sempre Pronto (Portuguese) and "隨時準備" (Chinese) meaning Always Ready in English.

== Headquarters ==
The Scouts' headquarters is The Fortress at Jardim Camoes, a 150-year-old well-preserved Portuguese-style fortress dating from colonial Macau and a famous tourist spot in the city. The Fortress was offered to the AEM in 1999 by the former Macau government, in appreciation of the contribution made by the Scouts and in supporting further development of Scouting in Macau.

== Organization ==
The organization is protected under Macau Basic Law Article 127 under Chapter VI Culture and Social Affairs.

=== Chief Commissioner ===
The Scout Association of Macau is headed by a Chief Commissioner and as of 2016 is led by Francisca Vong (黃健清).

== Ranks ==
- Chief Commissioner
- Deputy Chief Commissioner
- Department Commissioner
- Assistant Department Commissioner
- Chief of Division
- Assistant Chief of Division
- Trainer
- Assistant HQ Scout Leader
- Head Scouter
- Group Scout Leader
- Assistant Group Scout Leader
- Venture Scout Leader
- Venture Scout
- Scout Leader
- Scout
- Cub Scout Leader
- Cub Scout

=== Groups ===
The association has 36 groups with a total of about 5000 members.

Group	Type	Association
Group No.1 - Cub Scout, Scout, Venture Scout	Open Group	Pui Ching Middle School
Group No.2 - Cub Scout, Scout, Venture Scout	Open Group	Pui Va Middle School
Group No.3 - Cub Scout, Scout, Venture Scout	Open Group	Escola Luso-Chinesa Tecnico-Professional
Group No.4 - Cub Scout, Scout, Venture Scout	Open Group	Escola Luso-Chinesa Tecnico-Professional
Group No.5 - Cub Scout, Scout	Open Group	
Group No.6 - Cub Scout	School Group - Santa Rosa de Lima	Santa Rosa de Lima (English Session)
Group No.8 - Cub Scout, Scout	School Group - Chan Sui Ki Perpetual Help College	Chan Sui Ki Perpetual Help College
Group No.12 - Scout, Venture Scout	School Group - Yuet Wah College	Yuet Wah College
Group No.14 Scout	School Group - Escola Choi Nong Chi Tai	Escola Choi Nong Chi Tai
Group No.15 - Cub Scout, Scout, Venture Scout	School Group - Instituto Salesiano(慈幼中學)	Instituto Salesiano
Group No.16 - Cub Scout, Scout, Venture Scout	School Group - Sheng Kung Hui Choi Kou School Macau	Sheng Kung Hui Choi Kou School Macau
Group No.17 - Scout	School Group - Colegio Mateus Ricci	Colegio Mateus Ricci
Group No.18 - Cub Scout, Scout	Sponsored Open Group - Universal Buddhist Merciful Society (Macau)	Universal Buddhist Merciful Society of Macau
Group No.19 - Cub Scout	School Group - Escola Santa Maria Mazzarello	Escola Santa Maria Mazzarello
Group No.20 - Scout	Open Group - Orchestra (樂團 )	
Group No.21 - Cub Scout	Sponsored Open Group - YMCA Macau	YMCA Macau
Group No.22 - Cub Scout, Scout, Venture Scout	Sponsored Open Group - C.Z.N.A. Macau	Pui Va Middle School
Group No.23 - Scout	School Group - Colegio Catolico Estrela do Mar	Colegio Catolico Estrela do Mar
Group No.24 - Cub Scout, Scout, Venture Scout	Open Group	Escola Luso-Chinesa Tecnico-Professional
Group No.25 - Scout	School Group - Escola Sac Joao de Brito	Escola Sac Joao de Brito
Group No.28 - Cub Scout	School Group - D. Bosco Yuet Wah Primary School	D. Bosco Yuet Wah Primary School
Group No.29 - Scout	School Group - Pooi To Middle School (Macau)	Pooi To Middle School (Macau)
Group No.30 - Cub Scout	School Group - Escola da Sagrada Familia	Escola da Sagrada Familia
Group No.31 - Scout	School Group - Escola Tong Nam	Escola Tong Nam
Group No.32 - Cub Scout	School Group - The Affiliated School of the University of Macau	The Affiliated School of the University of Macau
Group No.33 - Cub Scout, Scout	School Group - Hou Kong Middle School	Hou Kong Middle School
Group No.34 - Cub Scout, Scout	Sponsored Open Group - Macao Jiangmen Communal Society	Macao Jiangmen Communal Society
Group No.35 - Cub Scout	School Group - Our Lady Fatima Girls' School (化地瑪聖母女子學校 )	Our Lady Fatima Girls' School, Macau
Group No.36 - Cub Scout	School Group - Sacred Heart Canissian College (聖心英文中學)	Sacred Heart Canissian College

== See also ==
- Scouting and Guiding in Mainland China
- The Scout Association of Hong Kong
