= Corpo Nacional de Escutas – Escutismo Católico Português =

Portuguese Scouting organization

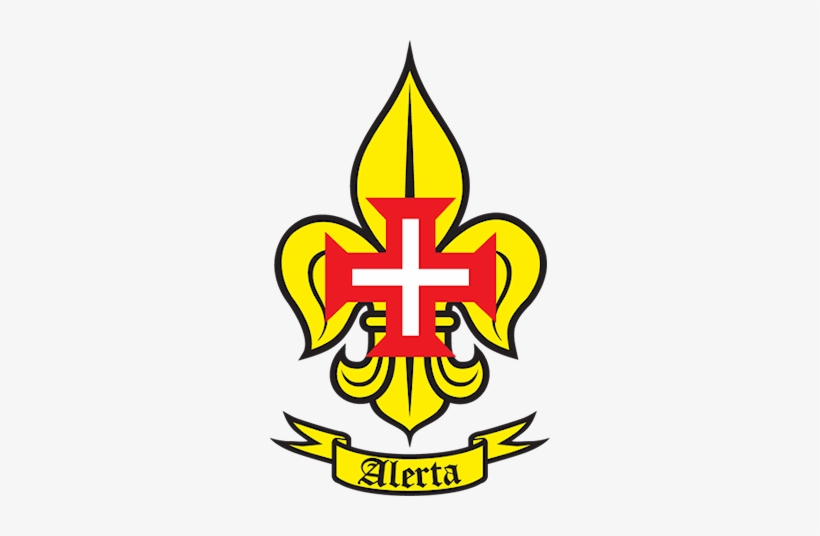
- Headquarters: Lisbon, Portugal
- Country: Portugal
- Website; Official Website

The Corpo Nacional de Escutas – Escutismo Católico Português (CNE, National Corps of Scouts - Portuguese Catholic Scouting) is the largest Portuguese Scouting organization. The association was founded in 1923 and became a member of the World Organization of the Scout Movement in 1929; at present, this membership is maintained via the Federação Escotista de Portugal. The association serves about 80,000 members of both genders.

The association is a member of the Comunidade do Escutismo Lusófono (Community of Lusophone Scouting).

== History ==
Archbishop Manuel Vieira de Matos and Dr. Avelino Gonçalves founded the CNE Scouting organization in Braga, Portugal on May 27, 1923. The founders had their first contacts with Scouting in Rome, when, in 1922, they attended a parade of 20,000 Scouts, on the occasion of the International Eucharistic Congress.

In 1922, the International Eucharistic Congress took place in Rome, Italy. Taking part in it was Braga archbishop D. Manuel Vieira de Matos with Dr. Avelino Gonzalves, his secretary. The Italian Catholic Scouts served in the Congress, giving it a youthful touch. The Archbishop was so impressed that he asked his Secretary "Can't we have them here, too?"

When they returned to Braga, they gathered a group of eleven like-minded individuals to discuss the opportunity and the possibility of the creating a group of Catholic Scouts in Portugal. On May 27, 1923, the Braga local authorities approved the "Corpo de Scouts Catolicos Portugueses". The next November, the Portuguese Government ratified the movement and approved the Statutes. The Corpo Nacional de Escutas was founded, the name being changed later. Although the CNE was incorporated in the city of Braga, a year later it was given nationwide authorization. The first national meeting was held in Braga in 1925, with Manuel Vieira de Matos as General Director, and Jose Maria de Queirós e Lencastre as National Commissioner.

The CNE grew up fast and determined. CNE began publishing a newsletter in February 1925, the Flor de Lis, which became a magazine in 1945. In 1926 the first National Camp took place in Aljubarrota; and two years later, the second one took place in Cacia (near Aveiro). In 1929 the CNE sent a contingent of 26 Scouts to the third World Jamboree, having been recognized by the World Scout Bureau. Since then the CNE has not missed an international meeting and has organized Portugal's National Scout Jamboree (ACANAC) whose permanent scout centre is now located in the municipality of Idanha-a-Nova.

== Program ==
=== Program sections ===
Cavaleiro da Pátria, the highest Scout rank badge

The association is divided in four sections according to the age of the members:

- Lobitos (Cub Scouts)
- Exploradores (Explorers, i.e. Boy Scouts)
- Pioneiros (Pioneers, i.e. Explorer Scouts)
- Caminheiros (Rover Scouts)

There is a special branch for Sea Scouts with distinct sections.

=== Scout Promise ===
Prometo, pela minha honra e com a graça de Deus, fazer todo o possível por:
Cumprir os meus deveres para com Deus, a Igreja e a Pátria;
Auxiliar o meu semelhante em todas as circunstâncias;
Obedecer à Lei do Escuta.

I promise, for my honour and with the grace of God, that I will do my best
to fulfill my duties to God, church and country,
to help my peers in all circumstances,
and to live by the Scout Law.

=== Scout Law ===
1. A Honra do Escuta inspira confiança.
  A Scout's honor is to be trusted.
2. O Escuta é Leal.
  A Scout is loyal.
3. O Escuta é útil e pratica diariamente uma boa acção.
  A Scout is useful and practises a good deed daily.
4. O Escuta é amigo de todos e irmão de todos os outros Escutas.
  A Scout is a friend to everybody and a brother to other Scouts.
5. O Escuta é delicado e respeitador.
  A Scout is sensitive and respectful.
6. O Escuta protege as plantas e os animais.
  A Scout protects the plants and animals.
7. O Escuta é obediente.
  A Scout is obedient.
8. O Escuta tem sempre boa disposição de espírito.
  A Scout is always of good humor.
9. O Escuta é sóbrio, económico e respeitador do bem alheio.
  A Scout is thrifty and respects the possessions of others.
10. O Escuta é puro nos pensamentos, nas palavras e nas acções.
  A Scout is pure in thoughts, words and deeds.

== See also ==
- Federação Escotista de Portugal
- Associação dos Escoteiros de Portugal
