= Girl Scouts of Taiwan =

- 中華民國台灣女童軍
- Location: Zhongshan District, Taipei
- Country: Republic of China (Taiwan)
- Founded: 1958
- Membership: 14,936 (2016)
- President: Zhou Yun-cai
- Affiliation: World Association of Girl Guides and Girl Scouts
- Website www.gstaiwan.org

Brownie	Scout

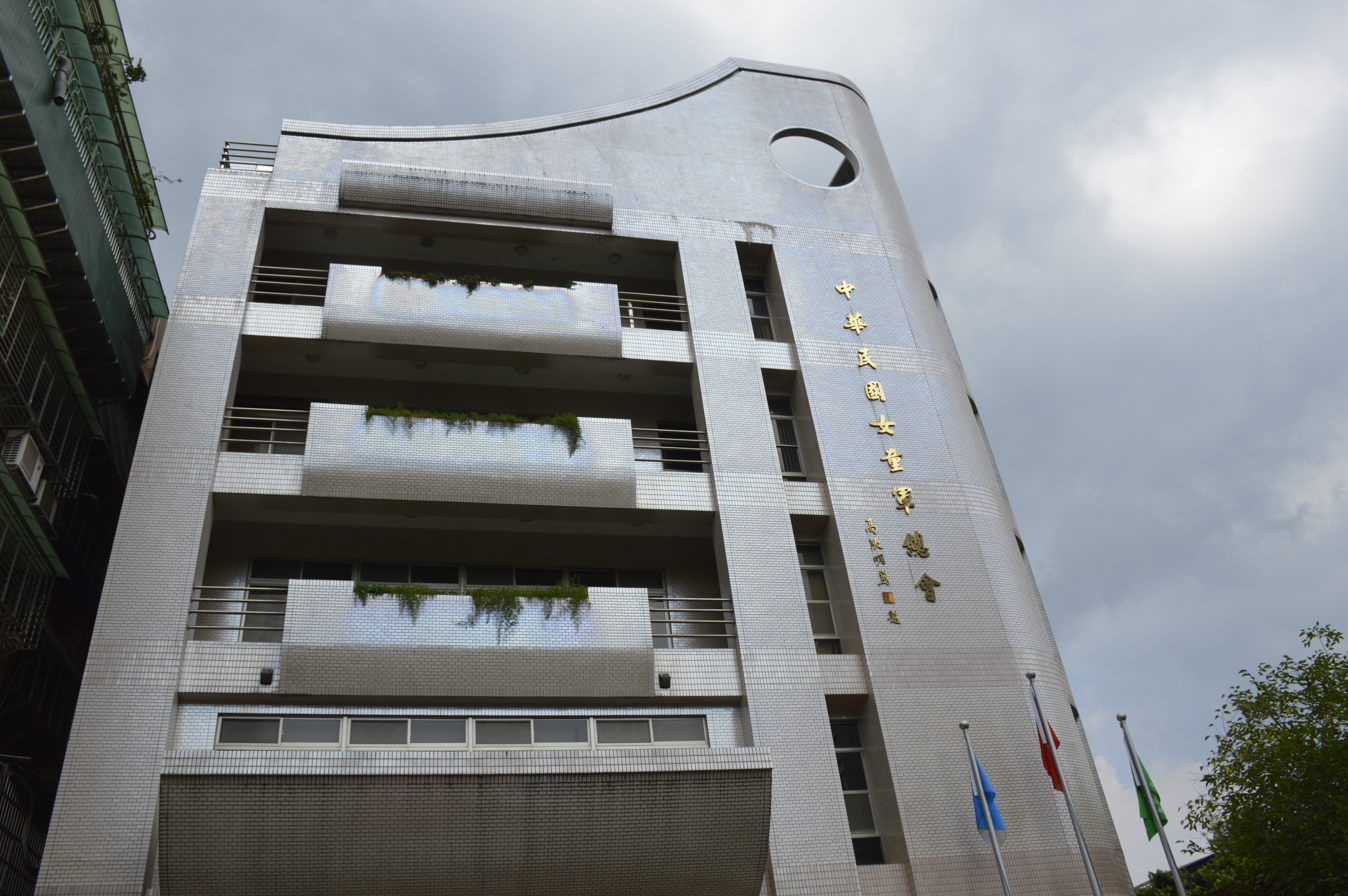
Headquarters of the Girl Scouts of Taiwan in Zhongshan District, Taipei

The Girl Scouts of Taiwan (Chinese: 中華民國台灣女童軍; Hanyu Pinyin: Zhōnghuámínguó Táiwān Nǚtóngjūn; Tongyong Pinyin: Jhōnghuámínguó Táiwān Nyǔtóngjyūn; lit. 'Republic of China Taiwan Girl Scouts') is the national Guiding organization of Taiwan (Republic of China). Girl Scouting was introduced to China in 1919; the association became a member of the World Association of Girl Guides and Girl Scouts in 1963.

The group changed its name from National Girl Scouts Association of the Republic of China to the National Girl Scouts Association of Taiwan in 1999. In 2002, the association opened the Girl Scout Center in Taipei and in 2006, and the organization was renamed the Girl Scouts of Taiwan.

As of 2003, the girls-only organization has 28,105 members.

== Programme and ideals ==
The programme is based on the fundamentals of WAGGGS along with the five Chinese educational themes: moral, physical, intellectual, group and beauty. It focuses on self-training (mentally and physically) to achieve full potential and become responsible citizens in the future.

階段名稱	英文名稱	年齡層
小小女童軍	Tadpole Girl Scouts	5～7
幼女童軍	Brownie Girl Scouts	7～11
女童軍	Girl Scouts	11～15
蘭姐女童軍	Ranger Girl Scouts	15～17
資深女童軍	Senior Girl Scouts	17～21或22
蕙質女童軍	Hueychi Girl Scouts	23以上
女童軍服務員	Leader	20以上

== Emblem ==
The Girl Scout emblem features the Blue Sky with a White Sun.

=== Guide Promise ===
Traditional Chinese

憑我的真誠，我願對上蒼和我的國家，
盡我的本分，我願隨時幫助他人，
我願意遵守女童軍規律。

Translation

On my honor,
I promise that I will do my best:
To do my duty to God and My country;
To help other people at all times;
To obey the Girl Scout Law.

=== Guide Law ===
Traditional Chinese

- 女童軍的榮譽是受人信賴的。
- 女童軍是忠心的。
- 女童軍是助人的。
- 女童軍是一切人的朋友，是每位女童軍的姐妹。
- 女童軍是謙恭的。
- 女童軍是愛護動物的。
- 女童軍是服從的。
- 女童軍是快樂的。
- 女童軍是勤儉的。
- 女童軍的言語、思想及行為是純潔的。

Translation:

Translation

- A Girl Scout's honor is to be trusted.
- A Girl Scout is loyal.
- A Girl Scout's duty is to be useful and to help others.
- A Girl Scout is a friend to all and a sister to every other Girl Scout.
- A Girl Scout is courteous.
- A Girl Scout is a friend to animals.
- A Girl Scout obeys orders.
- A Girl Scout smiles under all difficulties.
- A Girl Scout is thrifty.
- A Girl Scout is pure in thought, in word and in deed.

=== Guide Motto ===
Traditional Chinese

- 準備。
- 日行一善。
- 人生以服務為目的。

Translation

- Be Prepared
- Do a good turn daily
- The greatest aim in life is to serve.

== See also ==
- Yang Huimin
- Scouts of China
