= Scouting and Guiding in mainland China =

Scouting and Guiding were reported as banned (or ceased) in mainland China with the establishment of the People's Republic of China (PRC) by the Chinese Communist Party (CCP) since 1949. Instead, the Young Pioneers of China and the Communist Youth League, led by the CCP, have become the dominant youth organizations in mainland China for younger and older youth, respectively. However, China now has multiple and originally separate Scouting activities within its borders. In 2004, the Scout Club of Hainan, (Note: Chinese: 海南童子军俱乐部) borrowing heavily from Scouting in terms of emblems, uniforms and activities, was founded in Hainan province; it is, however, not affiliated with worldwide Scouting. An attempt to organize a nationwide Scouting organization in Wuhan was ended by the government in 2004. The Scout Association of the People's Republic of China, founded in 2008, serves Venture Scouts (15 years old to 20) in both genders as well as Rover Scouts (18 years old to 25). The Rover Explorer Service Association operates groups in China.

== History ==
=== Chinese Scouting in mainland China before 1950 ===
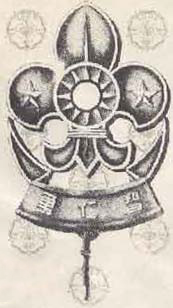
The historic membership badge of the General Association of the Scouts of China incorporated the Blue Sky with a White Sun. The Chinese characters are 勇 仁 智 (bravery, charity, wisdom).

Following the birth of the Republic of China, the first Scout troop was organized by Reverend Yen Chia-lin in Wuchang on February 25, 1912 and the Scouting movement spread rapidly all over the country.

The General Association of the Scouts of China was formally established in Nanjing in 1934, and became a member of the International Scout Bureau in 1937. Many Scouts actively participated in the Second Sino-Japanese War from 1937 to 1945.

There were 570,000 registered members in 1941. However, all Scouting activities in mainland were ceased in 1949, when the communists took over mainland China. The Chinese Scout Association was reorganized in 1950 after the ROC government was relocated to Taipei, and resumed membership in the International Scout Bureau as Scouts of China.

Japanese military authorities did not consistently encourage the Scouting movement in occupied territories. Where local conditions were favorable, authorities would permit local Scouting or introduce Japanese-style Scouting, or Shōnendan, and sometimes even made this compulsory. On the other hand, where conditions were not favorable, and anti-Japanese sentiments were likely to be nurtured through Scouting, the authorities would prohibit it entirely. After the start of the Second Sino-Japanese War in 1937, Japanese-style Scouting was occasionally introduced in some parts of occupied China. In May 1938, the Japanese Army and the puppet Chinese Government set up the Qingdao Chinese Boys' Corps, patterned after Japanese Scouting.

=== British and international Scouting in Shanghai ===
The 1st Dragon Troop, formed in 1909 and registered 1910, was the earliest Scout Troop in the Far East. It was destined to evolve into a viable British Association of British and English speaking Scouts whose nationalities were of more than forty countries, and who were full-time residents of the "International Settlement," at Shanghai, which had been a treaty port of China since 1842.

In 1909 a Troop of "Boy Scouts" was formed as a branch of the then-existing (British) "Boys' Brigade," a precursor to Shanghai Scouting, whose members were representative of the cosmopolitan but culturally Western population of the city.

On October 6, 1910, twenty-five boys were selected from the Boys' Brigade Scouts to form the "Shanghai Boy Scouts," independent of Headquarters, London, expressly for the purpose of separation from the Boys' Brigade. These were boys of various nationalities, including some British subjects and those of several different faiths.

In the spring of 1911, the Shanghai Boy Scouts finally left the Boys' Brigade, emerging as three Troops; A, B, and C. with approximately forty-two members wearing three different scarves. There were six Scoutmasters, the Chief Scoutmaster being G.R. Welch, a Briton. They were not registered at HQ, London and soon became an independent Association under the aegis of the Shanghai Municipal Council, the governing body of the International Settlement of Shanghai.

Before Empire Day, 1911, a mature, independent Dragon Troop with some choir boys of the Holy Trinity Cathedral amalgamated with a number of experienced British Scouts from the Boys' Brigade, and were issued a new warrant dated May 24, 1911, as the entirely British Troop. Consolidation was credited to a Warranted Scoutmaster from England, H.R. Hertslet. The Trinity Cathedral Church House and compound became the 1st Shanghai Baden-Powell Group's Headquarters for the next 30 years.

On April 12, 1912, a joint parade was held at the British Consulate Grounds in honor of Lt. General Sir Robert Baden-Powell, who inspected both Scout Associations during his visit to Shanghai. Undoubtedly all existing Scouts of the Settlement would have attended. Present were 35 Baden-Powell Scouts, 70 Shanghai Boy Scouts, 15 Baden-Powell Girl Scouts and combined, 11 Scoutmasters, for a total strength of 131. There were no Boys' Brigade Scouts present. It appears that Boys' Brigade had divested themselves of a Scouting program, which was in keeping with some similar actions in Great Britain around that time.

Soon after this parade, nine senior boys left the 1st Baden-Powell Troop to continue or complete their education in England. Thus, the 1st Shanghai Troop of Baden-Powell Scouts was able to make a presence at the "Imperial Scout Exhibition" in Birmingham, July 1913, as the "Dragon Troop" of Shanghai wearing their original dark uniforms of 1909. (1st Baden-Powell had changed to khaki in 1911.)

By April 1914, without any senior members of the Shanghai Public School left in the 1st Baden-Powell Troop, the remaining Cathedral School Scouts were registered as the 1st Shanghai Cathedral School Troop, thus becoming the 1st Baden-Powell. Their first Scoutmaster was L.R.Wheen. (Warranted April 7, 1914 HQ London.)

In August, the Great War in Europe had an unforeseen effect on the composition of the Scout Groups in Shanghai. F.C. Millington, one of the earliest Warranted Scoutmasters in the world, took charge of the 1st Baden-Powell Scouts at the end of 1914 and on January 30, 1915, he and Rev. A. J. Walker, invested twenty-two new boys from the two schools, including several senior British Scouts from the Shanghai Public School Troop of Shanghai Boy Scouts. By the end of 1914 five British Scouts had left to serve at the Western Front, as signalers.

On May 24, 1915, the fourth anniversary of the Troop, a telegram from HQ London, sanctioned the addition of all Public School Patrols, as a separate section of the 1st Baden-Powell. This included members of other nationalities, and without having to leave the den at the Shanghai Municipal Council's "state of the art" school building. These were the first international members of the British Association. By the end of the year at least another ten British Scouts including Millington, had left to serve their country.

A Combined Rally of three Associations was held on June 26, 1915. The Chinese Boy Scouts Association had approximately 200 attendees, the Shanghai Boy Scouts, about 30, and the Baden-Powell Scouts, about 60. The 1st Baden-Powell comprised Cathedral School Patrols and newly sanctioned Public School Patrols (formerly of the Shanghai Boy Scouts.) In August 1915, Fitzroy Lloyd took over as Scoutmaster with Samuel Hore as Assistant Scoutmaster. It is all but certain that Lloyd and Hore originated as Scouters in Boys' Brigade and were not warranted by HQ London until a few years later. C.A. Connor, W.R. Hatton and E. Judah also originated in Boys' Brigade and were skilled signalers; Connor was an Instructor, while Hatton was the first death recorded.

In late 1916, the Public School Patrols of 1st Baden-Powell became the 2nd Shanghai Public School Troop of Baden-Powell Scouts; they became the trailblazers for the thousands that followed in the next thirty years.

In 1919 a 3rd French Municipal School Troop and 4th Thomas Hanbury School Pack were formed and from 1919 to 1948 many new Troops of international members were registered with "Imperial Headquarters" (a name change in 1920). Sixteen Group numbers were issued by the Shanghai Branch, up to 1942. This rapidly growing Association provided impetus for mature Troops to form their own National Associations.

In Shanghai, Scout troops for the Americans, the French, the stateless Russians, and other Europeans, all got their start with the British Movement of the "International Settlement." Prior to the establishment of other Associations, foreign Scouts were taking instructions and passing tests in English and wearing British uniforms and badges. Many, however, did have the benefit of an early British education at schools in the International Settlement.

In regard to Chinese Scouts, they first started at Boone University in Wuchang in 1912, but began at Shanghai in 1913 with the help of resident bilingual British and American Scoutmasters. By the summer of 1915 they had grown into six Troops. Four out of the six were linked to Christian institutions and two were of secular schools. Chinese Scouts converted to their Nationalist Association toward the latter part of 1926. In 1932, at least four Chinese Scout paramedics became martyrs during the Battle of Shanghai.

The British Association's peak strength was 621 in 1940, averaging about ten constant Groups from 1932 to 1941. From the beginning of The Boy Scouts Association at Shanghai in 1911 up to 1948, sixteen Group Numbers were issued with several being reissued to new arrivals as older Groups expired. This eventually comprised about thirty known Groups of one or more units of Wolf Cub Packs, Scout Troops or Rover Crews.

In addition to several School and Church Groups, there was a Jewish Group, two Catholic Groups, two central European refugee Groups, Czechoslovak "Old Scouts," who became Rovers, two "White" Russian Troops and a French Municipal School Group. At one time there was even a German Lutheran Group based in Shanghai's German School, the Kaiser Wilhelm Schule, which was taken over by the Hitler Jugend in 1933, when their membership was cancelled. There were also two Shanghai Telephone Company Rover Crews, a Wool Manufacturing Company Cub pack and several Independent Groups.

Among the British Scout Groups in Shanghai was also the 5th Shanghai (Jewish) Boy Scout Troop, that was under the leadership of Scoutmaster Noel Jacobs. Jacobs and Scouts from the 5th Boy Scout Troop founded together with members from the Jewish youth movement Betar a Jewish unit in the Shanghai Volunteer Corps.

The European refugees were mostly Austrians and many others who had escaped the Holocaust. They were the latest Scouts to find safe haven in Shanghai but became restricted to a designated area by the Japanese military during the occupation. They became very active after the war when other Groups were closing and those of all nationalities were emigrating to various parts of the world, while awaiting their own turn in 1948.

In 1939 the 13th (United) Group were founded by the Austrian Scouter Fredy Mittler in Shanghai. This group consisted of Austrian and German Jewish émigrés. It was affiliated to The Boy Scout Association. At the end of World War II there were 120 members. This group continued its service also after World War II. The Group closed after most of the members left for Europe, America and Australia after World War II. Until the Group closed there were active members in Shanghai, Australia, Austria, the United States and South America. The members abroad reported about their new life in the Groups paper "The 13th News". Within the 13th United Group were Cubs, Scouts, Rovers, Old Scouts, Brownies and Girl Guides. In 1947 Patrol Leader Robert Knop gained the rank of King Scout and the Red All Round Cord. Patrol Leader Fritz Tausig took part in the 6th World Scout Jamboree as a member of the Austrian Contingent.

In much earlier decades they were preceded by other refugees who had been persecuted by the pogrom in Siberia, and Russians who had escaped the Russian and Bolshevik Revolutions of 1917 and 1918.

The heyday of the British Association was from 1931 to 1941. The Cathedral School, which moved into a new building in 1928, finally became a senior school. The Cathedral School Troop won the Rotary Shield Competition four times in nine years, competing with all the Scout Troops of Shanghai. The Shanghai Public School in the Eastern District had won the first two contests in 1921 and 1922, but at that time there were only two competitors. In the subsequent years the Jewish Troop won it seven times, the Public School twice, Russians twice, the French once, the Catholics once, and, in 1941, in what was destined to become the final Jamboree, the Western District Public School won by what was an unprecedented margin of 10%.

British Scout also provided Postal Service for the International Settlement during a big strike in 1932.

The Crown Colony of Hong Kong was the official Far Eastern base of Britain's China's fleet, but Deep Sea Scouts of the Royal Navy were frequent visitors to Shanghai, their "home away from home." The Royal Navy's first reported visit with local Scouts at Shanghai was in 1911, before Deep Sea Scouts or Rover Scouts existed.

The Scouting District of Shanghai endured for over four decades, and thrived under the authority of Lord Baden-Powell and the International Commissioners at Imperial Headquarters, London, starting with Hubert S. Martin in 1920–38, Richard Frost in 1938–43, and Glad Bincham in 1943–52. These administrations preceded the universally recognized "British Groups Abroad" of the Scout Association, at Gilwell, in the United Kingdom. Shanghai's vibrant Association of "British Scouts," whose members were actually mostly international, lasted through WW II. By 1943, virtually all British and Allied nationals had been interned by the Japanese for duration of the war. Their plight at best was unpleasant and humiliating, and in many cases tragic. Nevertheless, Scouting continued, discreetly during the occupation of 1941–1943, and secretly from 1944–1945, when tensions had reached a dangerous level.

British Scouting did not always end with Japanese occupation. In Shanghai, District Commissioner A. H. Gordon negotiated with the Japanese to allow Scouting for boys of various nationalities to continue in early 1942, though they were involved mainly in efforts at self-sufficiency through raising vegetables and keeping livestock in the Hungjao (Hongqiao) Scout camp.

After two world wars and major political, economic and societal changes, the Communist government had taken over in 1949, and the British Association virtually ended with the terminal illness of District Commissioner A. H. Gordon (awarded the Silver Wolf, 1950) the last British Scout. He witnessed a remaining Pack of mature Wolf Cubs grow up into the small Catholic "Champagnat" Scout Troop, before he left China in July 1950.

There were no longer any British members but he put these international boys as well as association flags into the trusted hands of Warranted Assistant Commissioner for Rovers, Emil Štembera, a Czechoslovak. This Acting Commissioner was obliged to disband them in November 1953 and did so at a solemn ceremony, reaffirming the "Scout Promise"in closing the Troop and Shanghai Branch.

=== British Scouting in other parts of mainland China ===
In 1930 there were British Boy Scout Troops not only in Shanghai, but also in Tientsin.

=== Russian Scouting in mainland China 1922–1947 ===
Russian Scouts fleeing Bolshevism followed White Russian émigrés from 1917 to 1922 through Vladivostok to the east into Manchuria and south into central China, where very large groups of Russian Scouts came into being in cities such as Harbin, Tientsin and Shanghai.

=== American Scouting in other parts of mainland China ===
There were also several American Scout Troops in China during the 1920s i.e. in Beijing.

== Recent developments ==
Since the transfer of sovereignty over Hong Kong to PRC in 1997, the Scout Association of Hong Kong (SAHK) has been actively organising exchange programmes in mainland China. In 2004, the SAHK, the Shenzhen Youth Federation and the Working Committee of Young Pioneers in Shenzhen organized the first joint camp with 490 Hong Kong and 360 Shenzhen participants. The SAHK held five regional camps in mainland China in 2005: in Xinjiang, Gansu, Qinghai, Jilin and Inner Mongolia. All mainland China activities of the SAHK are coordinated via its "International and Liaison Branch".

The Hong Kong Girl Guides Association has also established partnerships with youth and women organizations in mainland China.

A first local Scout organization emerged in the Tianjin municipality in 1997 mainly aimed at disadvantaged children. It was still active in January 2004 with 40 local groups and more than 4,000 members of both genders, but its actual current status is unknown.

An attempt to start a nationwide Scouting organization in Wuhan was curtailed by the government in mid-2004. The website of the incipient organization continues to exist as an active community of people interested in the subject, but the organization has not been restarted.

Also in mid-2004, the Scout Club of Hainan was started in Hainan province. It borrows heavily from international Scouting in terms of its emblem, ideals, uniforms, and activities, and has organized frequent outdoor camps since its founding. It is not aligned to an international Scouting movement.

The Shanghai Scout Club founded in Shanghai in December 2006 participated in JOTI 2007 and JOTI 2008. It also borrows heavily from international Scouting in terms of its emblem, ideals, uniforms, and activities. This group was mentioned as a Radio Scout group in the Austrian Scout magazine Telescout-News in December 2007. The Shanghai Scout Club joined the newly founded Scout Association of the People's Republic of China and is registered as Shanghai Scout. Further units of this Scout association are the Rover Alpha Fujian Crew, Guangdong Rover, Rover "A" Jiangsu Crew. The Scout Association of the People's Republic of China serves Rover Scouts and Venture Scouts. Scouts of these associations took part in JOTA and JOTI 2009 and the association issued several memorabilia for these events. In close connection to Scout Association of the People's Republic of China is the Team Delta Rovers (中国三角洲成人童军队).

== International Scouting units in mainland China ==
In addition, British Scouts have units of The Scout Association in various cities including Nanjing. In 2011 there was one Beaver Colony in Nanjing. There are two units of Girlguiding UK, served by British Guides in Foreign Countries in Shanghai. USA Girl Scouts Overseas in the People's Republic of China are serviced by way of USAGSO headquarters in New York City, with troops in Beijing, Guangzhou, Kunming, Nanjing, Shanghai, Shekou, Tianjin and Zhuhai. Also, there are both American Cub Scout packs and Boy Scout troops in Beijing and Shanghai, as well as American Cub packs in Wuxi and Tianjin and an American Boy Scout troop in Dali. Further more there are a Varsity Scout Team in Beijing and Lone Scouts in Xiamen (Amoy) and possibly other locations, linked to the Direct Service branch of the Boy Scouts of America, which supports units around the world. American Scouting in mainland China is open to youth holding a foreign passport and includes youth from Korea, Australia, France, Germany, Russia, Brazil, Great Britain, Sweden and Singapore. Furthermore, French Scouts are also active in Shanghai with the Groupe Scout Francophone de Shanghai in partnership agreement with the Scouts Unitaires de France and in Beijing with Scouts et Guides de France.

== Chinese Scouting ideals ==
The Scout Motto in Chinese is 准备, translating as Be Prepared (pronunciation may vary by spoken variant). The Scout Motto in Uyghur is Tayyar Bol, translated as Be Prepared.

== See also ==
- Liu Bocheng
- Sun Li-jen
- Yang Huimin
- Scouting and Guiding in Hong Kong
- Scouting and Guiding in Macau
- Boy Scouts of Manchukuo
