= Associação Guias de Portugal =

National Guiding association of Portugal

- Guide Association of Portugal
- Country: Portugal
- Founded: 1930
- Membership: 3,291
- Affiliation: World Association of Girl Guides and Girl Scouts
- Website http://www.guiasdeportugal.org/

The Associação Guias de Portugal (AGP; roughly Guide Association of Portugal) is the national Guiding association of Portugal. Guiding in Portugal started in 1919 and became a member of the World Association of Girl Guides and Girl Scouts (WAGGGS) in 1963. The girls-only organization has 3,291 members (as of 2003). Its headquarters are located in Lisbon.

== History ==
The first Guide group in Portugal was formed in 1911 in Porto, being an overseas group of The Guide Association (UK). This group – and the British Guides on Madeira – supported the development of Portuguese Guide groups in 1919.

In 1930, the AGP was formed; it was officially recognized by the government in 1934, but had to suspend all activities in 1938 due to political unrest.

The AGP became an associate member of WAGGGS in 1963 and a full member in 1975.

== Program and ideals ==
The association's aims are the formation and the development of girls and young women through the Scout method by four main principles: life in the patrol, life in the outdoors, commitment to the community and progressive programs.

The membership badge of Associação Guias de Portugal shows a trefoil superimposed with an elongate cross fleury, the ends having a shape like a fleur-de-lys.

The association is divided in four age-groups:

- Avezinha - Little Bird (ages 6 to 10)
- Guia Aventura - Adventure Guide (ages 10 to 14)
- Guia Caravela - Caravelle Guide (ages 14 to 17)
- Guia Moínho - Windmill Guide (ages 17 to 19)

== See also ==
- Federação Escotista de Portugal
