= Boy Scouts of Manchukuo =

Organization in Japanese-occupied Manchuria

Boy Scouts of Manchukuo 滿洲國童子團聯盟
- Top text: "大滿洲帝國童子軍聯盟" (The Boy Scouts Alliance of the Empire of Great Manchuria); bottom text: "智、勇、仁" (Wisdom, Courage, Benevolence)

- Scout flag; the central design has two dragons crossing in an "x" pattern.
- Country: Manchukuo
- Founded: September 1932/May 6, 1934

The Boy Scouts of Manchukuo (Chinese: 滿洲國童子團聯盟; pinyin: Mǎnzhōuguó Tóngzǐ Tuán Liánméng) was a Scouting association of Manchukuo. The Japanese military seized Manchuria in 1931, created the puppet government of Manchukuo in 1932, and controlled it until 1945. The Manchukuo government also set up Japanese-style Scouting in schools, which included para-military training.

== Background ==
In February 1937, Isamu Takeshita was appointed head of the Boy Scouts of Japan, the Sea Scouts, and the YMCA, as part of the general militarisation of Japanese sports and athletics taking place at that time. Japanese military authorities did not consistently encourage the Scouting movement in occupied territories. Where local conditions were favourable, authorities would permit local Scouting or introduce Japanese-style Scouting, or Shōnendan, and sometimes even made this compulsory. On the other hand, where conditions were not favourable, and anti-Japanese sentiments were likely to be nurtured through Scouting, the authorities would prohibit it entirely.

Japanese military leaders banned Scouting for Chinese boys in occupied China by 1937, however they encouraged Japanese-style Scouting (少年團 Shōnendan) in Manchuria. In 1938 membership in the Concordia Shōnendan (協和少年團) was made compulsory for young people between 10 and 15 years old. Alternately styled the Manchukuo Boys Corps, Manchuria Boy Scout Organisation, and the Manchuria League of Boy Scouts, the Scouts used the Scout motto of the existing Scouts of China, "智、勇、仁" (Wisdom, Courage, Benevolence), and Scout court of honour ceremonies were held at Confucian shrines.

== Emblem ==
The elaborate emblem incorporated the flag of Manchukuo, as well as the dragons from the Manchu Qing dynasty crossing in an "x" pattern. According to the Document of the Explanation of National Flag issued by the State Council of Manchukuo on February 24, 1933, the colours on the flag represented the four directions and centre. The Study of Manchukuo National Flag published by the State Council later also gave a representative based on Wu Xing.

- Yellow represented the centre, symbolizing the rule of emperor of four directions and virtue of Ren in Confucianism, also Earth in Five Elements
- Red represented the South, symbolizing passion and courage, also Fire in Five Elements
- Blue represented the East, symbolizing youthfulness and holiness, also Wood in Five Elements
- White represented the West, symbolizing purity and justice, also Gold in Five Elements
- Black represented the North, symbolizing will and determination, also Water in Five Elements

The colours also represented the five major peoples in Manchukuo:

- Yellow represented the Manchu people
- Red represented the Japanese (Yamato) people
- Blue represented the Han Chinese
- White represented the Mongol people
- Black represented the Korean people

== Russian Scouting in China and Manchuria 1922–1947 ==
Russian Scouts fleeing Bolshevism followed White Russian émigrés from 1917 to 1922 through Vladivostok to the east into Manchuria and south into central China, where very large groups of Russian Scouts came into being in cities such as Harbin, Tientsin, and Shanghai.

== See also ==
- Scouts of China
