= Associação dos Escoteiros de Portugal =

- Scout Association of Portugal
- Headquarters: Lisbon
- Country: Portugal
- Founded: 1913
- Website escoteiros.pt

The Associação dos Escoteiros de Portugal (AEP, Scout Association of Portugal) is a national youth organization dedicated to education and the development of civic character through the principles of Scouting. Founded in 1913, it was the first Scouting organization established in Portugal and was among the founding members of the World Organization of the Scout Movement (WOSM).

Unlike many other Scouting organizations in Portugal, the AEP is non-denominational and not affiliated with any religious institution. Since 1979, the association has been coeducational, welcoming both boys and girls between the ages of 6 and 21.

The AEP is also a member of the Comunidade do Escutismo Lusófono (Community of Lusophone Scouting).

== Program ==
The AEP promotes social values from a humanist and non-militaristic perspective. It encourages participation in cultural activities and sports, and provides education on health and well-being.

=== Program sections ===
Its members are organized into the following age-based divisions:

- Alcateia (ages 7 to 10): equivalent to Cub Scouts
- Escoteiros (Júnior) (ages 10 to 14): equivalent to Boy Scouts
- Exploradores (Sénior) (ages 14 to 17): equivalent to Explorer Scouts
- Clã (ages 17 to 21): equivalent to Rover Scouts
- Adults serve as leaders and supervisors.

Youth members can join the Associação dos Escoteiros de Portugal (AEP) at any division appropriate for their age, without needing prior experience in the earlier sections. Adults may join existing units as leaders or assist in forming new Scout groups.

While the association is coeducational, in practice, patrols are generally single-gender due to challenges encountered with mixed-gender groupings.

=== Scout Motto ===
Sempre Pronto, Always Ready

=== Scout Promise ===
The Scout Promise of the Associação dos Escoteiros de Portugal is:

Prometo por minha Honra fazer o meu melhor por:
Cumprir os meus deveres para com a minha Fé e a Pátria;
Auxiliar o Próximo em todas as circunstâncias;
Viver segundo a Lei do Escoteiro.

Translation:

On my honor, I promise to do my best:
To fulfill my duties to my faith and my country;
To help others in all circumstances;
And to live according to the Scout Law.

=== Scout Law ===
The Scout Law (Lei do Escoteiro) of the Associação dos Escoteiros de Portugal is as follows:

- O Escoteiro é verdadeiro e a sua palavra é sagrada.
  A Scout is truthful and his word is sacred.
- O Escoteiro é leal.
  A Scout is loyal.
- O Escoteiro é prestável.
  A Scout is helpful.
- O Escoteiro é amigo de todos e irmão dos demais escoteiros.
  A Scout is a friend to all and a brother to other Scouts.
- O Escoteiro é cortês.
  A Scout is courteous.
- O Escoteiro é respeitador e protetor da natureza.
  A Scout respects and protects nature.
- O Escoteiro é responsável e disciplinado.
  A Scout is responsible and disciplined.
- O Escoteiro é alegre e sorri perante as dificuldades.
  A Scout is cheerful and smiles in the face of difficulties.
- O Escoteiro é económico, sóbrio e respeitador dos bens dos outros.
  A Scout is thrifty, sober, and respects others’ property.
- O Escoteiro é íntegro no pensamento, palavra e ações.
  A Scout is upright in thought, word, and deed.
