= Scouting and Guiding in Hong Kong =

Scouting and Guiding in Hong Kong was begun by The Boys' Brigade in 1909. There is also a record of Chums Scouts and the British Boy Scouts in Hong Kong. Later, the St. Joseph's College Scouts were formed in 1913 and registered with The Boy Scouts Association of the United Kingdom in 1914 as its 1st Hong Kong Troop. The Boy Scouts Association's Hong Kong Branch was formed in 1915 and after 1967 was renamed The Scout Association, Hong Kong Branch. In 1977, The Scout Association of Hong Kong was formed.

The Scout and Guide movement in Hong Kong is currently served by

- Hong Kong Girl Guides Association, member of the World Association of Girl Guides and Girl Scouts
- The Scout Association of Hong Kong, member of the World Organization of the Scout Movement

The Scout Association of Hong Kong has 96,682 Scouts, and The Hong Kong Girl Guides Association has 55,145 Guides.

Meanwhile, the Boys' Brigade movement in Hong Kong is represented by the Boys' Brigade, Hong Kong.

== International Scouting units in Hong Kong ==
- There are an American Cub Scout pack and Boy Scout troops in Hong Kong, linked to the Direct Service branch of the Boy Scouts of America, which supports units around the world.
- Girl Scouts of the USA, served by USAGSO headquarters
- Scouts Canada has a group in Hong Kong

== See also ==
- English-Speaking Guides Hong Kong
