= Federación de Escultismo en España =

Scouting Federation of Spain

- English: Federation of Scouting in Spain
- Country: Spain
- Founded: 1978
- Membership: 53,184
- Affiliation: World Organization of the Scout Movement
- Website scoutsfee.es

Spain has 53,184 Scouts (as of 2011) served by Federación de Escultismo en España (Federation of Scouting in Spain), a federation of several organizations. Scouting was founded in Spain in 1912 and was among the charter members of the World Organization of the Scout Movement in 1922.

In 1940, as a consequence of the Spanish Civil War, Scouting was suspended until 1977 when the Asociación de Scouts de España movement was legalized to replace the Asociación Nacional de Exploradores de España (ANEDE) (English: National Association of the Explorers of Spain).

In 1978, the World Office of the Scouting Movement consolidated membership of three organizations (Scouts de España, Movimiento Scout Católico and ACDE – Asociació Catalana d'Escoltisme) as the Federación de Escultismo en España.

== Members ==
Current full members of the federation are

- the Movimiento Scout Católico (MSC, Catholic, coed)
- the Federación de Scouts-Exploradores de España (ASDE, interreligious, coed).

The Federació Catalana d'Escoltisme i Guiatge (FCEG) recently changed its former full membership to associated membership within the national federation. It is only active in Catalonia and consists again of three associations:

- the Minyons Escoltes i Guies de Catalunya (MEG, Catholic, coed)
- the Escoltes Catalans (EC, laic, coed)
- Acció Escolta de Catalunya (AE, interreligious; coed; WOSM-Member only).

The FCEG, along with the Federación Española de Guidismo (FEE), make the Comité de Enlace del Guidismo en España which is the Spanish member of the World Association of Girl Guides and Girl Scouts.

== See also ==
- Scouting in Spain
- Exploradores Barceloneses
- Exploradores de España
