= Scouting and Guiding in Western Sahara =

Scouting and Guiding associations in Western Sahara

badge created for Scouts in El Aaiún with the assistance of Scouts from the Association of Scouts of the Canary Islands.

Scouting exists in Western Sahara both as part of the Fédération Nationale du Scoutisme Marocain as well as independent groups.

- Scouting (Scouts de Sahara (Arabic: منظمة الكشاف الشعبي) is being developed in Laayoune with the assistance of Scouts from the Association of Scouts of the Canary Islands.
- Spanish Scouts have established contacts with the Moroccan Scoutisme Hassania Marocain, a member of the Fédération Nationale du Scoutisme Marocain.,
- The Youth Union of Saguia el-Hamra and Río de Oro has decided to start a Scout movement, but it is unclear if any groups exist: , . This movement is collaborating with the Organización Juvenil Española, a Spanish Scout-like organization .
- Saharan Scouts are also purported to exist in the refugee camps of Tindouf, Algeria. The embassy of the Sahrawi Arab Democratic Republic in Algeria uses "Movimiento de Exploradores saharaui" and translates this as "Scouts" .
- Les Guides de France, the French Girl Guiding movement, organized an international forum in 2001 about the major problems in society and today's world. Alongside the Italian, Welsh, and Polish delegations, and associated organizations including the Comité catholique contre la faim et pour le développement, Khadidja Hamdi, Saharawi parliamentarian in charge of information and culture in the National Union of Sahrawi Women, as well as Régine Villemont, general secretary of the French Association of Friends of SADR, took part in leading a discussion on peace. The Guides de France from Aix en Provence welcomed a group of eleven Saharawi children in 2001."

The Scout Motto is Kun Musta'idan or كن مستعدين, translating as Be Prepared in Arabic. The noun for a single Scout is Kashaf or كشاف in Arabic.

== Notes ==
Western Sahara is disputed territory, not presently independent. The two main claimants are the Kingdom of Morocco and the Polisario Front independence movement (and government of the Sahrawi Arab Democratic Republic or SADR), who dispute control of the territory. Since a United Nations-sponsored cease-fire agreement in 1991, most of the territory has been controlled by Morocco, with the remainder under the control of Polisario/SADR. As the international Scouting movement is an educational youth movement, it takes a neutral position on each side's claims, and the existence of Scouting on the land area of Western Sahara does not imply any official position in the dispute.
