= Scouting and Guiding in Spain =

Scouting and Guiding associations in Spain

The Scout Movement in Spain consists of about 30 independent associations, most of them active on the regional level. Due to the regionalisation of Spain, even the larger nationwide associations are divided into regional sub-associations with individual emblems, uniforms and Scout programs.

== Associations ==
Spanish Scout associations are divided in three organizational groups:

- Associations affiliated to the World Organization of the Scout Movement (WOSM)
- Associations affiliated to the World Association of Girl Guides and Girl Scouts (WAGGGS)
- Independent organizations, including a number of members of the smaller international umbrella organizations.

=== WOSM member organizations ===
The Federación de Escultismo en España is the National Scout Organization within WOSM. It serves 58,744 Scouts (as of 2004) and consists of three member organizations:

- Federación de Scouts-Exploradores de España (full member; interreligious; ASDE); its sub-associations include
  - Scouts de Canarias
- Movimiento Scout Católico (full member; Catholic; MSC)
- Federació Catalana d'Escoltisme i Guiatge (observer; Federation of Catalan Scouts and Guides); its member organizations are
  - Acció Escolta de Catalunya (interreligious; also affiliated to ASDE; WOSM-Member only)
  - Escoltes Catalans (secular)
  - Minyons Escoltes i Guies Sant Jordi de Catalunya (Catholic).

=== WAGGGS member organizations ===
Spanish Guiding is affiliated to WAGGGS via the Comité de Enlace del Guidismo en España, an umbrella federation serving 7.154 members (as of 2003). The Comité has two member organizations; both are again umbrella federations:

- Federación Española de Guidismo
  - Asociación Guías de Aragón
  - Associació Guiatge Valenciá
  - Escoltes i Guies de Mallorca
  - Euskal Eskaut Gia Elkartea
- Federació Catalana d'Escoltisme i Guiatge
  - Escoltes Catalans
  - Minyons Escoltes i Guies de Catalunya

=== Independent Scout organizations ===
Independent (or non-aligned) Scout organizations in Spain include:

- Asociación Española de Guías y Scouts de Europa (500 members; Catholic); affiliated to the Union Internationale des Guides et Scouts d'Europe
- WFIS en España; affiliated to the World Federation of Independent Scouts; with three regional members:
  - Associació Catalana de Scouts
  - Asociación de Scouts Independientes de Madrid
  - Asociación Galega de Escultismo, Breogán Scouts
- Asociación de Guías y Scouts ASA - Andalucía
- Federación de Asociaciones Scouts Baden-Powell
- Asociación Juvenil De Escultismo Andaluz
- Centre Marista d'Escoltes
- Federación Scout Regional de Madrid

== Past organizations ==
=== Scouts Hispanos ===
Scouts Hispanos
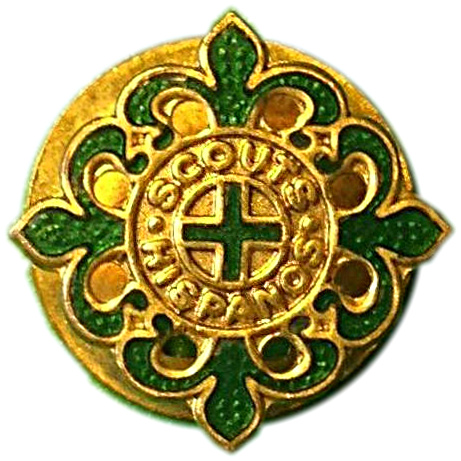
- Defunct: 1940

Scouts Hispanos was a Spanish Catholic Scouting organization created in Madrid by the priest Jesús Martínez in 1934, which had some social impact and was adopted in other cities, but was cut short with the advent of the Spanish Civil War.

== International Scout and Guide units in Spain ==
- Boy Scouts of America, served by the Transatlantic Council in Madrid and Rota
- Girlguiding UK, served by British Guides in Foreign Countries
- Girl Scouts of the USA, served by USAGSO headquarters
- The Scout Association served by British Scouting Overseas, operates units in Fuengirola, Madrid and Majadahonda.
- Scouts et Guides de France operates one group in Barcelona
- Scouts unitaires de France operates one group in Madrid

== Emblems ==
Scouts de España, 1960-1978

== Scout-like organizations ==
- Organización Juvenil Española

== See also ==
- Scouts de España
- Exploradores Barceloneses
- Exploradores de España
