= Federación Española de Guidismo =

- Spanish Federation of the Guide Movement
- Country: Spain
- Founded: 1984
- Membership: 1,500
- President: Antonio Jose Saez Gavilanes
- Affiliation: Comité de Enlace del Guidismo en España, World Association of Girl Guides and Girl Scouts
- Website federacionguidismo.org

The Federación Española de Guidismo (FEG; Spanish Federation of the Guide Movement) is a federation of several Spanish Guiding organizations, serving about 1,500 members. It is a member of the Comité de Enlace del Guidismo en España and thus affiliated to the World Association of Girl Guides and Girl Scouts.

== Member organizations ==
As of 2013, the FEG had five member organizations serving 16 local Guide troops with about 1,500 individual members:

- Asociación Guías de Aragón
- Asociación Guías de Torrelodones
- Associació Guiatge Valencià
- Escoltes i Guies de Mallorca
- Euskal Eskaut-Gia Elkartea

Former members of the FEG include:

- Asociación Guías de Madrid, currently suspended (in dissolution)
- Asociación Xuvenil Grupo Scout-Guía Vasco da Ponte (formerly Asociación Coeducativa de Escultismo e Guidismo Galego), now integrated in the Federación de Scouts-Exploradores de España

All current member organizations are coeducational, accepting both boys and girls.

=== Asociación Guías de Aragón ===
The Asociación Guías de Aragón (AGA; Guide Association of Aragon) is the regional member organization serving Guide troops in Aragon. In 2009, it had eight local units.

Its logo shows the traditional colors of Aragon, taken from the Coat of arms of the Crown of Aragon, and the World trefoil of the World Association of Girl Guides and Girl Scouts.

=== Associació Guiatge Valencià ===
Logo of the Associació Guiatge Valenciá

The Associació Guiatge Valenciá (AGV; Guiding Association of Valencia) serves currently one Guide group in Moncada, Valencia with about 60 members.

The association was founded in 1964 in Moncada. Until the early 1970s it grew to 15 groups with about 500 active Guides. Most of these groups merged with Scout groups in the 1970s; the association consisted of four groups in 1976 and lost all but the founding unit in Moncada until 1982. A second unit was started in Bétera in 1995, but dissolved in 2006.

The association's logo shows a stylized trefoil.

=== Escoltes i Guies de Mallorca ===
Logo of the Escoltes i Guies de Mallorca

The Escoltes i Guies de Mallorca (EGM; Scouts and Guides of Mallorca) serves two Scout and Guide groups on Majorca.

The organization was founded in 1979 as Escoltes de Mallorca, after a scission of the Roman Catholic Moviment Escolta i Guiatge a Mallorca within the Movimiento Scout Católico in 1975. It became a member of the ESLAK (Coordination of laic Scout and Guide Associations) in 1990 and remained it until ESLAK's dissolution. In 1995 it became a member of the FEG searching international recognition; as a consequence of this it changed its name to Escoltes i Guies de Mallorca.

=== Euskal Eskaut-Gia Elkartea ===
Logo of the Euskal Eskaut Gia Elkartea

The Euskal Eskaut-Gia Elkartea (EEGE; Basque Scout and Guide Association) serves five Scout and Guide groups in the Basque country with about 500 members. EEGE became a member of ESLAK in 1994.

== Ideals ==
The member organizations of the FEG share a common Guide law and a common Guide promise. While the Guide law may not be altered, the wording of the Guide promise may be changed.

=== Guide law ===
1. La Guía es persona que cumple su palabra y en quien se puede confiar
2. La Guía es fiel a sus principios.
3. El deber de la Guía es ser útil y ayudar a las demás personas.
4. La Guía es amiga de toda persona y hermana de toda Guía Scout.
5. La Guía es cortés.
6. La Guía ama, convive y defiende la Naturaleza.
7. La Guía es democrática.
8. La Guía es alegre y optimista
9. La Guía es sencilla y económica.
10. La Guía trabaja por la libertad, la paz, la igualdad y el respeto a las demás personas.

=== Guide promise ===
Me comprometo a hacer cuento de mí dependa para:

- Ser consecuente con mis creencias, Ser útil a la Comunidad y Vivir de acuerdo a la Ley Guía.
