= Scouts de España =

The Scouts de España (1960–1978) was a nondenominational Scouting organization in Spain after the official dissolution of other Scouting movements in Spain in 1940 under Francisco Franco. This organization was marked by differences with Catholic Scouting groups such as the Movimiento Scout Católico that, under the shelter of the Roman Catholic Church (generally at the parish-level) also maintained activity during this period.

== Scouts de España versus Scouts Católicos ==
Between the movements existed a fundamental confessional difference, which also induced differences in the growth and financing of the groups. The Scouts de España were locally organized and self-managed, whereas the Catholics were generally parochially organized and managed. Other differences existed in the Scout ideals. The Catholic Scout Motto was "Always Alert", whereas the Scouts de España were "Always Ready", for example.

== Social acceptance ==
Both movements always enjoyed support of the population, and although officially dissolved, the Scout movements were given tacit permission to maintain activities until the present era and the later resurgence of Scouting in Spain after 1977. Authorities showed ample general tolerance with the movement in spite of the de jure illegality of their situation.

== Program and ideals ==
The national emblem of the Scouts de España was the fleur-de-lis formed in the shape of a Cross of Saint James.

The text of the Scout Promise that-after surpassing the corresponding tests for an aspiring tenderfoot to become a Scout, was:

Prometo por mi honor, y con la ayuda de Dios, hacer cuanto de mí dependa para cumplir mis deberes para con Dios y la Patria, ayudar a mi prójimo en toda circunstancia y cumplir fielmente la Ley Scout.

I promise on my honor, and with the aid of God, to do whatever depends on me to fulfill my duties towards God and the Mother country, to help to my fellows in all circumstances and to faithfully obey the Scout Law.

== Scout Law ==
1. El Scout cifra su honor en ser digno de confianza.
2. El Scout es leal a su patria, sus padres, sus jefes y sus subordinados.
3. El Scout es útil y ayuda a sus semejantes.
4. El Scout es amigo de todos y hermano de los demás scout sin distinción de clases ni razas.
5. El Scout es cortés y caballeroso.
6. El Scout ve en la Naturaleza la obra de Dios y respeta y protege a los animales y las plantas.
7. El Scout es obediente, disciplinado y no hace nada a medias.
8. El Scout es animoso y sonríe y canta ante peligros y dificultades.
9. El Scout es trabajador, económico y cuida el bien ajeno.
10. El Scout es limpio y sano, puro en sus pensamientos, palabras y acciones.

It was customary to say that there was an unwritten eleventh point-The Scout is not an idiot.
