= Comité de Enlace del Guidismo en España =

Spanish national Guiding association

- Joint Committee for Guiding in Spain
- Country: Spain
- Founded: 1955/1962
- Membership: 7,559
- Affiliation: World Association of Girl Guides and Girl Scouts

The Comité de Enlace del Guidismo en España (Catalan: Comité d'Enllaç del Guiatge a Espanya; Joint Committee for Guiding in Spain) is the Spanish national Guiding association. Guiding was introduced to Spain in 1929. The Comité de Enlace del Guidismo en España became a full member of World Association of Girl Guides and Girl Scouts in 1969. Guiding has actually 7,559 members in Spain (as of 2008).

The member organizations are:

- Federacion Española de Guidismo (FEG)
- Federació Catalana d'Escoltisme i Guiatge (FCEG, only in Catalonia)

Both member organizations are umbrella federations. Their members are:

- Federación Española de Guidismo (FEG)
  - Asociación Guías de Aragón (AGA)
  - Asociación Guías de Torrelodones
  - Associació Guiatge Valencià (AGV)
  - Escoltes i Guies de Mallorca (EGM)
  - Euskal Eskaut Gia Elkartea (EEGE)
- Federació Catalana d'Escoltisme i Guiatge (FECG)
  - Escoltes Catalans (EC)
  - Minyons Escoltes i Guies de Catalunya (MEG)

All Spanish Guiding associations are interreligious, except the Catholic MEG, and are coeducational.

The Catalan FCEG is also an associated member of the Federación de Escultismo en España and so affiliated to WOSM.

== See also ==
- Scouting in Spain
