= Federación de Scouts-Exploradores de España =

Federación de Scouts-Exploradores de España (ASDE)

- Membership badge until 2000
- English: Federation of Spanish Scout Associations
- Headquarters: Madrid
- Founded: 1912/1977
- Membership: 31,458
- President: Julio del Valle de Íscar
- Affiliation: Federación de Escultismo en España
- Website www.scout.es

The Federación de Scouts-Exploradores de España (ASDE, Federation of Spanish Scouts/Explorers) is a Spanish Scout association. It is one of the members of the Federación de Escultismo en España and thus of the World Organization of the Scout Movement. It serves 31,458 members (as of 2006).

== History ==
The Exploradores de España, of whom ASDE claims to be heir, was founded in 1912 by Teodoro Iradier y Herrero and Arturo Cuyás under the name Exploradores de España - Boy-scouts españoles (Explorers of Spain - Spanish Boy-Scouts). It was among the founding members of the Boy Scouts' International Conference in 1920.

In 1940, after the Spanish Civil War the Exploradores de España were suspended by Franco's regime, but afterwards could continue their activities as Asociación Nacional de Exploradores de España (ANEDE, National Association of Spanish Explorers) with a semi-tolerated status.

The organisation was fully legalised in 1977 under the name Asociación de Scouts de España (The Scout Association of Spain) during the reforms after Franco's death. In 1978, it formed the Federación de Escultismo en España with the Movimiento Scout Católico and the Federació Catalana d'Escoltisme i Guiatge and was readmitted to the World Organization of the Scout Movement the same year.

== Programme ==
=== Programme sections ===
The ASDE is divided in five sections according to age:

- Castores/Castors/Kastoreak (Beaver Scouts)—ages 5/6 to 7/8
- Lobatos/Llobatons/Otso-kumeak (Cub Scouts)—ages 7/8 to 10/11
- Scouts/Rangers/Scoutak (Scouts)—ages 11/12 to 13/14
- Escultas/Pioneros/Pioners/Eskultak/Pioneroak (Senior Scouts)—ages 13/14 to 16/17
- Rovers/Rutas/Roverrak (Rover Scouts)—ages 16/17 to 21/22

=== Scout Motto ===
The scout motto in four Spanish languages is:

- Spanish: Siempre Listo
- Basque: Beti prest
- Catalan: Sempre a punt
- Galician: Sempre Listo

They each translate to the same meaning in English: "Always Ready".

=== Scout Oath ===
Por mi honor prometo hacer cuanto de mi dependa para:

- cumplir mis deberes para con Dios y la Patria,
- ayudar al projimo en toda circunstancia y
- cumplir fielmente la Ley Scout.

Translation:

On my honor, I promise that I will do my best:

- to do my duty to God and the country,
- to help other people at all times and
- to obey the Scout Law.

=== Scout Law ===
El Scout cifra su honor en ser digno de confianza.
El Scout es leal para con su Patria, padres, jefes y subordinados.
El Scout es util y ayuda a los demas sin pensar en recompensa.
El Scout es amigo de todos y hermano de todo Scout.
El Scout es cortes y caballeroso.
El Scout ve en la Naturaleza la obra de Dios. Protégé animales y plantas.
El Scout obedece sin replicar, nada hace a medias.
El Scout sonrie y silba ante sus dificultades.
El Scout es ahorrador y cuidadoso del bien ajeno.
El Scout es limpio y sano en pensamientos, palabras y acciones.

Translation:

A Scout's honor is to be trusted.
A Scout is loyal to his country, his parents, his leaders and those under him.
A Scout's duty is to be useful and to help others without benefit.
A Scout is a friend to all and a brother to every other Scout.
A Scout is courteous and a gentlemen.
A Scout sees the work of God in nature. He loves animals and plants.
A Scout obeys orders without question and leaves nothing half done.
A Scout smiles and sings under all difficulties.
A Scout is thrifty and respects other people's property.
A Scout is clean in thought, word and deed.

== Regional organisations ==
The ASDE is a federation of independent regional organisations, organised according to the autonomous communities of Spain. Its members are:

- Andalusia: Scouts de Andalucía
- Aragon: Scouts de Aragón
- Principality of Asturias: Exploradores del Principado de Asturias
- Balearic Islands: Scouts de Baleares
- Islas Canarias: Scouts de Canarias
- Cantabria: Scouts de Cantabria
- Castilla-La Mancha: Scouts de Castilla-La Mancha
- Castile and León: Exploradores de Castilla y León
- Ceuta: Scouts de Ceuta
- Extremadura: Scouts de Extremadura
- Galicia: Scouts de Galicia
- La Rioja: Scouts de La Rioja
- Madrid: Exploradores de Madrid
- Melilla: Scouts de Melilla
- Region of Murcia: Exploradores de Murcia
- Valencian Community: Scouts Valencians
- Basque Country: Euskadiko Esploratzaileak

The organisation has no groups in Catalonia or Navarre.

== See also ==
- Exploradores de España
- Exploradores Barceloneses
