= Exploradores Barceloneses =

Barcelonan Scout association (1911–1940)

Exploradores Barceloneses (Barcelonan Boy Scouts)
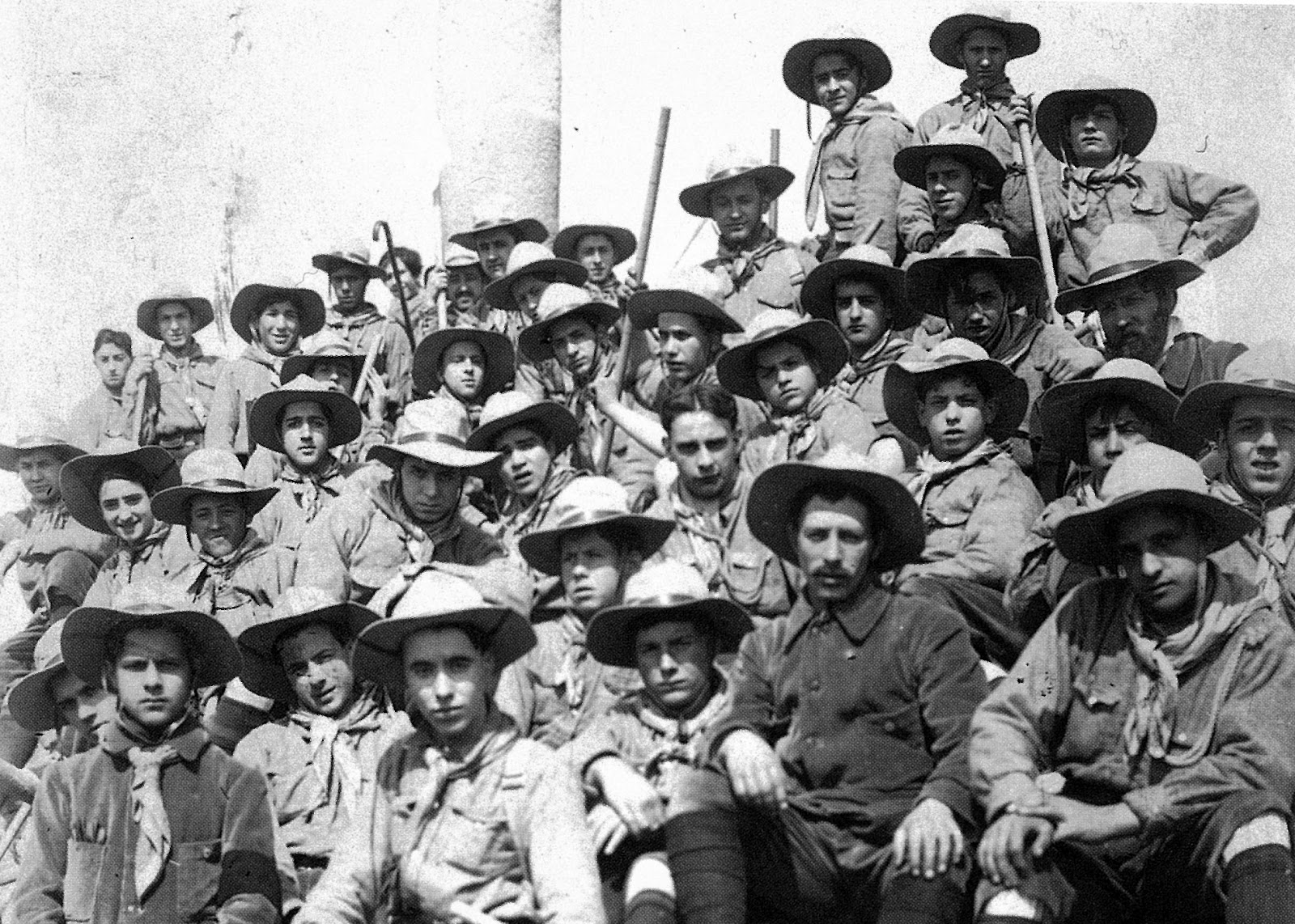
- Almacenes el Siglo Troop (1913). With Ramón Solé i Lluch as their instructor.
- Country: Spain
- Founded: 1911
- Defunct: 1940
- Founder: Pedro Roselló Axet

The Exploradores Barceloneses was the first scouting initiative in Spain, the local version of Robert Baden-Powell's Boy Scouts founded in 1911 by cavalry captain Pedro Roselló Axet. It was a pro-Spanish institution that was also in favor of decentralization. This initiative was successful thanks to the collaboration of teachers from various private schools.

== History ==
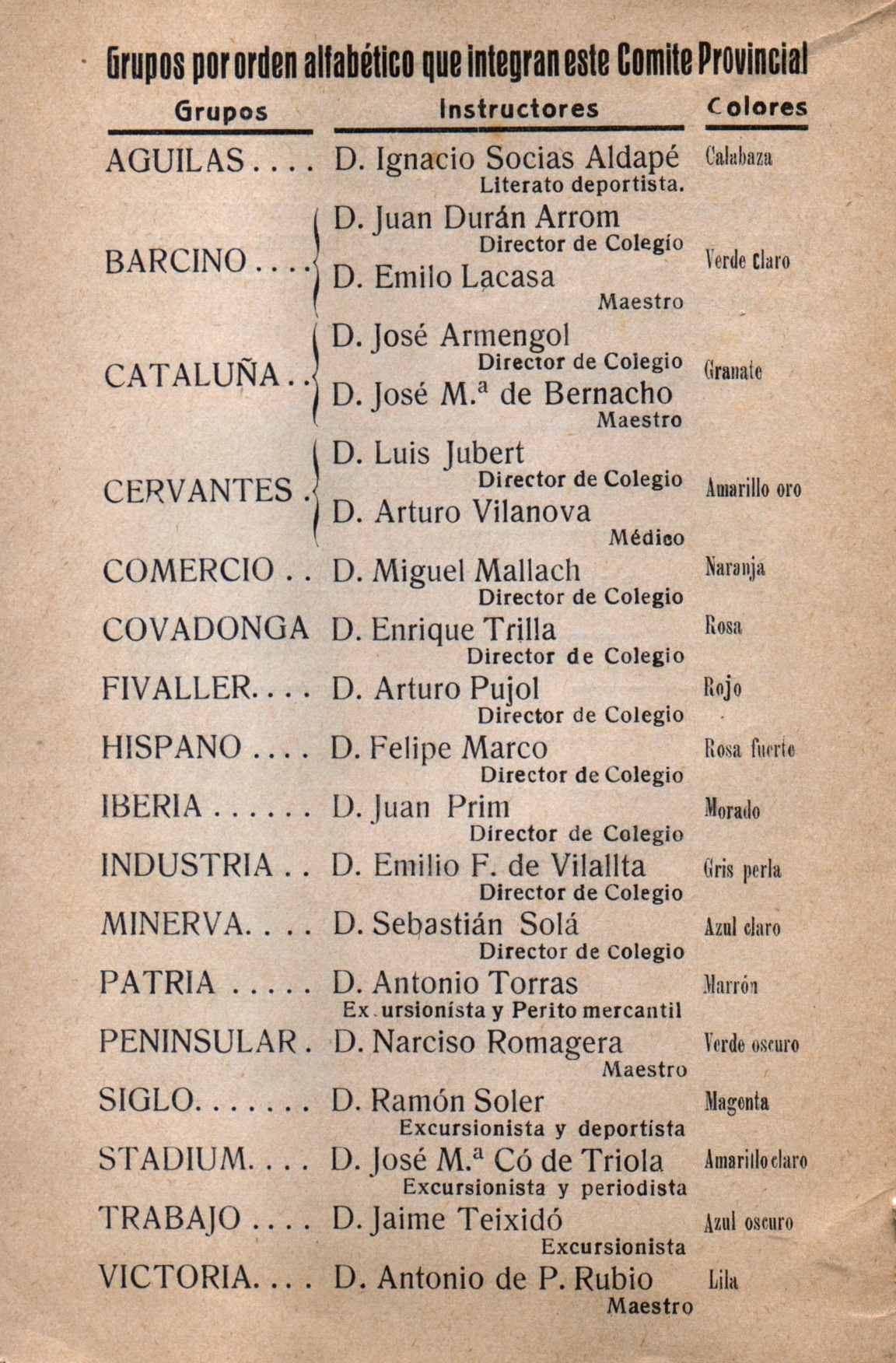
List of groups of Exploradores Barceloneses that was on the back of the Explorador's booklet.

Pedro Roselló was friend and colleague of Teodoro Iradier y Herrero - founder of the Exploradores de España together with Arturo Cuyás Armengol. They got in touch with the French scouts during their stay in France and Teodoro Iradier gave Pedro Roselló (who was a cavalry captain in the Numáncia Regiment) the idea of creating a troop of boy scouts.

However, it was Ramón Soler i Lluch (a hiker and worker of La Seda) who started the first boy scouts group in 1911. With several groups in operation, the provincial boy-scouts committee was officially constituted on November 5, 1912. They sent a cordial greeting to the Exploradores de España just after its creation, and got integrated into the association the following year.

The first gathering was held on January 19, 1913, at the Palau de les Belles Arts. The first solemn Promise happened that day, as well as the first parade through the streets of Barcelona.

In less than three years the success had been notable, with the following active troops:

- Águilas
- Barcino
- Cataluña
- Cervantes
- Comercio
- Covadonga
- Fivaller
- Hispano
- Iberia
- Industria
- Marco Polo
- Minerva
- Patria
- Peninsular
- Siglo
- Stadium
- Trabajo
- Victoria

Three groups were located in Sant Feliu de Llobregat, Tarragona, and Manresa.In 1914, the total census was 1,064 scouts, 48 instructors, a committee of 12 members, and 240 protective members.

== See also ==
- Exploradores de España
- Federación de Scouts-Exploradores de España
- Scouting in Spain

== Bibliography ==
- Genovés Guillem, Enrique (1984). Cronología del Movimiento Scout (in Spanish). ISBN 978-84-398-1106-0. OCLC 20231075.
