= Federació Catalana d'Escoltisme i Guiatge =

Scout and Guide associations in Catalonia, Spain

- Catalan Federation of Scouting and Guiding
- Country: Spain, Catalonia
- Founded: 30 June 1977
- Affiliation: Federación de Escultismo en España, Comité de Enlace del Guidismo en España
- Website http://www.fceg.cat/

The Federació Catalana d'Escoltisme i Guiatge (FCEG, Catalan Federation of Scouting and Guiding) is the federation of three Scout and Guide associations in Catalonia. It is an associated member of the Federación de Escultismo en España (FEE) and a full member of the Comité de Enlace del Guidismo en España (CEGE). Through FEE and CEGE it ensures the memberships of the Catalan Scout and Guide associations in the World Organization of the Scout Movement and the World Association of Girl Guides and Girl Scouts.

Members of the FCEG are:

- the Acció Escolta de Catalunya (AE, interreligious, coeducational; WOSM-affiliation only), also affiliated to the Federación de Scouts-Exploradores de España,
- the Escoltes Catalans (EC, laic, coeducational),
- the Minyons Escoltes i Guies de Catalunya (MEG, Catholic, coeducational).

The total membership of the FCEG is about 20,000 people and 200 local units. Its largest member, the MEG, has about 13,000 members in 140 local units. The AE has 16 local units, the EC 38 local units.

== Program ==
Each of the component associations has a distinctive program and different interpretations of the Scout Promise and the Scout Law.

=== Acció Escolta ===
Acció Escolta de Catalunya

==== Sections ====
The association is divided in five sections according to age:

- ages 7 to 9: Castors
- ages 9 to 12: Llops
- ages 12 to 15: Raiers
- ages 15 to 18: Pioners
- ages 18 to 20: Róvers

==== Scout Law ====
- L’escolta s’esforça per merèixer la confiança i fa confiança a tothom.
- L’escolta és coherent amb els seus principis i compromisos i respecta els dels altres.
- L’escolta és útil i altruista.
- L’escolta és amic de tothom i treballa per la pau.
- L’escolta estima el seu país o entorn i se sent ciutadà del món.
- L’escolta protegeix i estima la natura.
- L’escolta viu i treballa en equip.
- L’escolta és decidit i afronta els seus reptes.
- L’escolta és auster i gaudeix del treball.
- L’escolta és sincer i juga net.

=== Escoltes Catalans ===
Escoltes Catalans

==== Sections ====
- ages 6 to 9: Follets
- ages 9 to 12: Llops
- ages 12 to 15: Raiers
- ages 15 to 17: Pioners
- ages 17 and older: Clan

==== Scout Law ====
- L’escolta valora l’esforç.
- L’escolta respecta i té cura de la seva persona, tant físicament com mental.
- L’escolta fa del respecte mutu una norma de vida personal i col·lectiva.
- L’escolta és sincer i és conseqüent en el seu pensament.
- L’escolta és honest.
- L’escolta és responsible.
- L’escolta és solidari amb totes les persones que lluiten per la llibertat i la justícia.
- L’escolta està compromès a millorar la societat i participa activament en la vida col·lectiva.
- L’escolta adopta un estil de vida no consumista i auster, i és alegre i optimista.
- L’escolta se sent part integrant de la natura i la defensa de qualsevol agressió. L’estima, la coneix i la respecta.
- L’escolta estima el seu país, el coneix i defensa la seva identitat nacional, tot respectant la dels altres.
- L’escolta és fidel al seu compromís.

=== Minyons Escoltes i Guies de Catalunya ===
Minyons Escoltes i Guies de Catalunya

==== Sections ====
The association is divided in five sections according to age:

- ages 6 to 8: Castors
- ages 8 to 11: Llops and Daines
- ages 11 to 14: Ràngers and Noies Guies
- ages 14 to 17: Pioners and Caravel·les
- ages 17 to 19: Truc

==== Scout Law ====
- Ens esforcem a merèixer confiança, i fem confiança a tothom.
- Vivim la nostra fe, i respectem les conviccions dels altres.
- Aprenem a ser útils, i a fer servei.
- Som germans de tothom, i treballem per la pau.
- Som fidels al nostre país, i ens sentim ciutadans del món.
- Defensem la natura, i protegim la vida.
- Aprenem a viure en equip, i tot ho fem entre tots.
- Som decidits, i afrontem les dificultats sense por.
- Estimem el treball, i volem fer bé les coses.
- Aprenem a estimar, i a jugar net.
