= Movimiento Scout Católico =

- Headquarters: Gran Via de les Corts Catalanes, 416 1º 4ª
- Location: Barcelona
- Country: Spain
- Founded: May 7, 1961
- Membership: 26,000
- President: Juan Vicente González Font
- Vice President: Carlos Lucas and Roberto Garrido
- Affiliation: Federación de Escultismo en España
- Website scouts.es

The Movimiento Scout Católico (MSC; Catholic Scout Movement) is a Roman Catholic Scouting organization in Spain. The Movimiento Scout Católico is a federation of regional Scouting associations and member of the Federación de Escultismo en España. Its groups are generally parochially organized and managed.

== Member associations ==
- Scouts Católicos de Andalucía
- Asociación Interdiocesana Scouts d'Aragón - MSC
- Scouts d'Asturies - MSC
- Scouts Católicos de Canarias
- Scouts Católicos de Cantabria - MSC
- Federación de Scouts Católicos de Castilla-La Mancha
- Scouts de Castilla y León - MSC
- Euskalerriko Eskautak
- ADE Mérida-Badajoz
- Scouts de Galicia - Escutismo Católico Galego
- Federació d'Escoltisme i Guiatge de les Illes Balears - MSC
- Scouts de Madrid - MSC
- Scouts Católicos de Murcia
- Federació d'Escoltisme Valencià - MSC

== Program and ideals ==
The Scout Motto is "Sempre alerta" ("Always Alert").

=== Program sections ===
- Castores (Beavers)—ages 6 to 8
- Lobatos (Cub Scouts)—ages 8 to 11 or 12
- Scouts/Guias/Rangers/Exploradores (Scouts/Guides)—ages 12 or 13 to 14
- Pioneros (Explorer Scouts)—ages 15 to 17
- Rutas (Rover Scouts)—ages 17 to 22
