= Scouting and Guiding in Venezuela =

Scouting and Guiding associations in Venezuela

The Scout and Guide movement in Venezuela is served by

- Asociación de Guías Scouts de Venezuela, member of the World Association of Girl Guides and Girl Scouts
- Asociación de Scouts de Venezuela, member of the World Organization of the Scout Movement
- Federación de Boy Scouts Independientes de Venezuela

== International Scouting units in Venezuela ==
- In addition, there are American Boy Scouts in Maracaibo, linked to the Direct Service branch of the Boy Scouts of America, which supports units around the world.
