= Federico Díaz Legórburu =

First Chief Scout of the Asociación de Scouts de Venezuela
- In office 7 September 1945 – ?

Federico Díaz Legórburu (12 September 1915 – 21 March 2002) served as the first Chief Scout of the Asociación de Scouts de Venezuela, Chairman of the Interamerican Council of Scouting, as well as a member of the World Scout Committee from 1957 to 1963.

== Biography ==
He joined the Scout movement in 1926 at the Alemán Valencia Catholic College and made his Scout promise on September 9, 1933. He translated several classics of Scout literature into Spanish, such as The Patrol System by Roland Philipps and wrote many Scout manuals.

The first Constitution of the Asociación de Scouts de Venezuela was adopted on 22 August 1934 in the National Assembly, headed by National Commissioner Henrique Sapene, Scoutmaster Marcel Granier Doyeux, Assistant Scoutmaster Federico Diaz Legorburu, and Enrique Tejera Paris as witness. Following the 1935 resignation of National Commissioner Henrique Sapene, the Federation appointed Enrique Tejera Paris and Federico Diaz Legorburu as Interim Commissioners. On 7 September 1945, the National Assembly amended the Constitution, changing the designation of National Chief Scout Commissioner for Venezuela, choosing Federico Diaz Legorburu as first Chief Scout.

Venezuelan Scouting was deeply involved in the 1946 creation of the Interamerican Council of Scouting, and in 1961 Federico Diaz Legorburu was host to the Fifth Interamerican Scout Conference, which took place at the Hotel Humboldt in Caracas.

In 1979, he was awarded the 135th Bronze Wolf, the only distinction of the World Organization of the Scout Movement, awarded by the World Scout Committee for exceptional services to world Scouting, as well as many other Scout decorations from Latin American countries.
