= Stephanie Halfen =

Venezuelan-American architect

Stephanie Dornbusch de Halfen
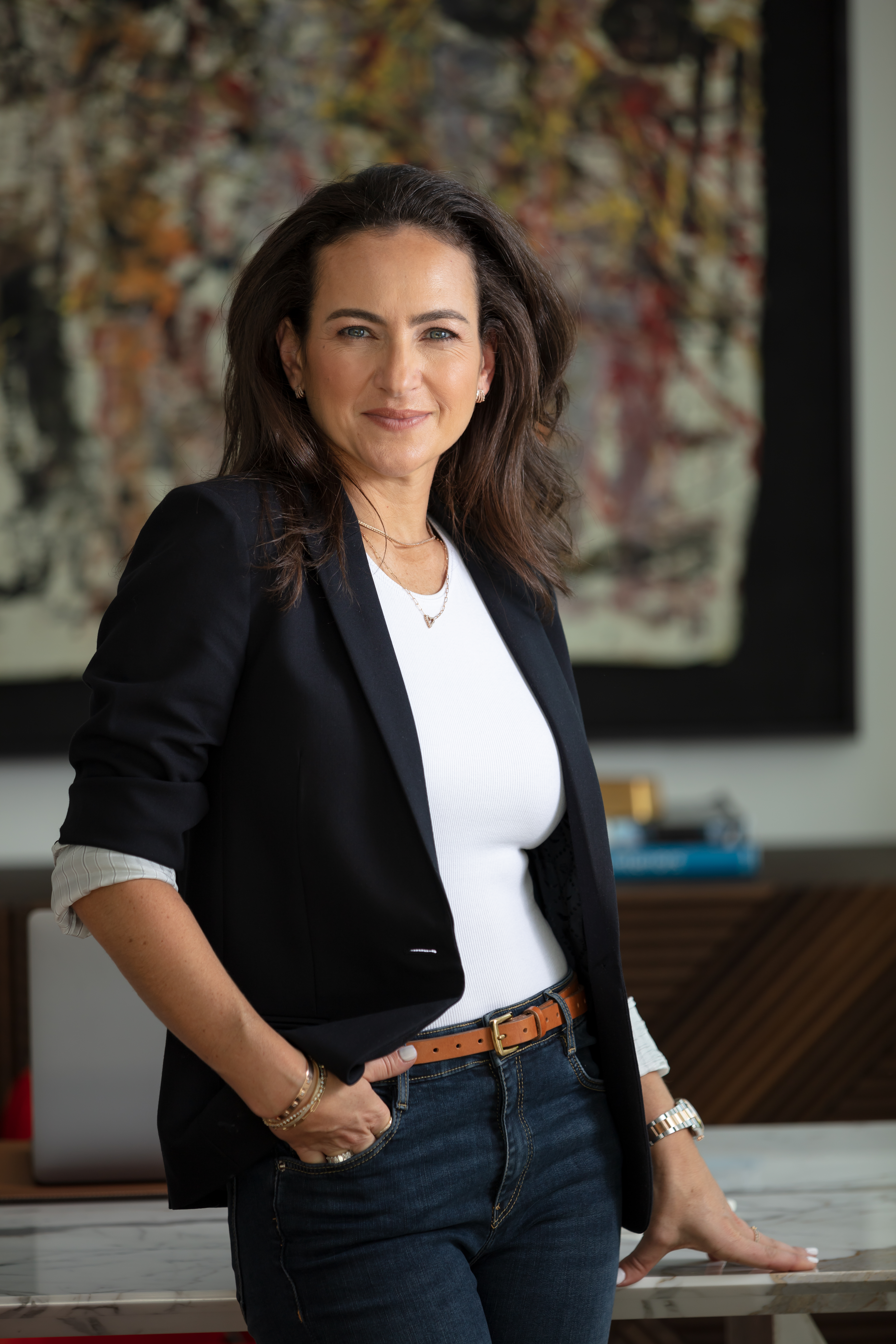
- Education: Universidad Simon Bolivar, Parsons School of Design
- Occupation: Architect
- Practice: SDH Studio Architecture + Design
- Projects: 95 West Residence, Bal Cross Residence, Belle Meade, and Tamarind Residence
- Website: https://sdhstudio.com/

Stephanie Dornbusch de Halfen is a Miami-based architect and founding principal of SDH Studio Architecture + Design, an architecture and interior design firm founded in 2012. Halfen's firm is known for its focus on Tropical Modernism primarily in Miami, Florida and the Caribbean.

== Career ==
Halfen designed a residential project in El Avila National Park in Venezuela, while studying. Later, she became an associate professor at her alma mater – the Universidad Simon Bolivar.

Halfen relocated to Miami in 2009 and founded SDH Studio Architecture + Design in 2012. It has been named Gold List Honoree in 2023 in Architecture, Interior Design.

== Personal life and education ==
Halfen was born and raised in Caracas, Venezuela. She graduated Summa Cum Laude in architecture from the Universidad Simon Bolivar and graduated from the Parsons School of Design in New York with an Interior Design degree.
