= Teleférico de Caracas =

Gondola lift in Caracas, Venezuela

Coordinates: 10.5124°N 66.8867°W

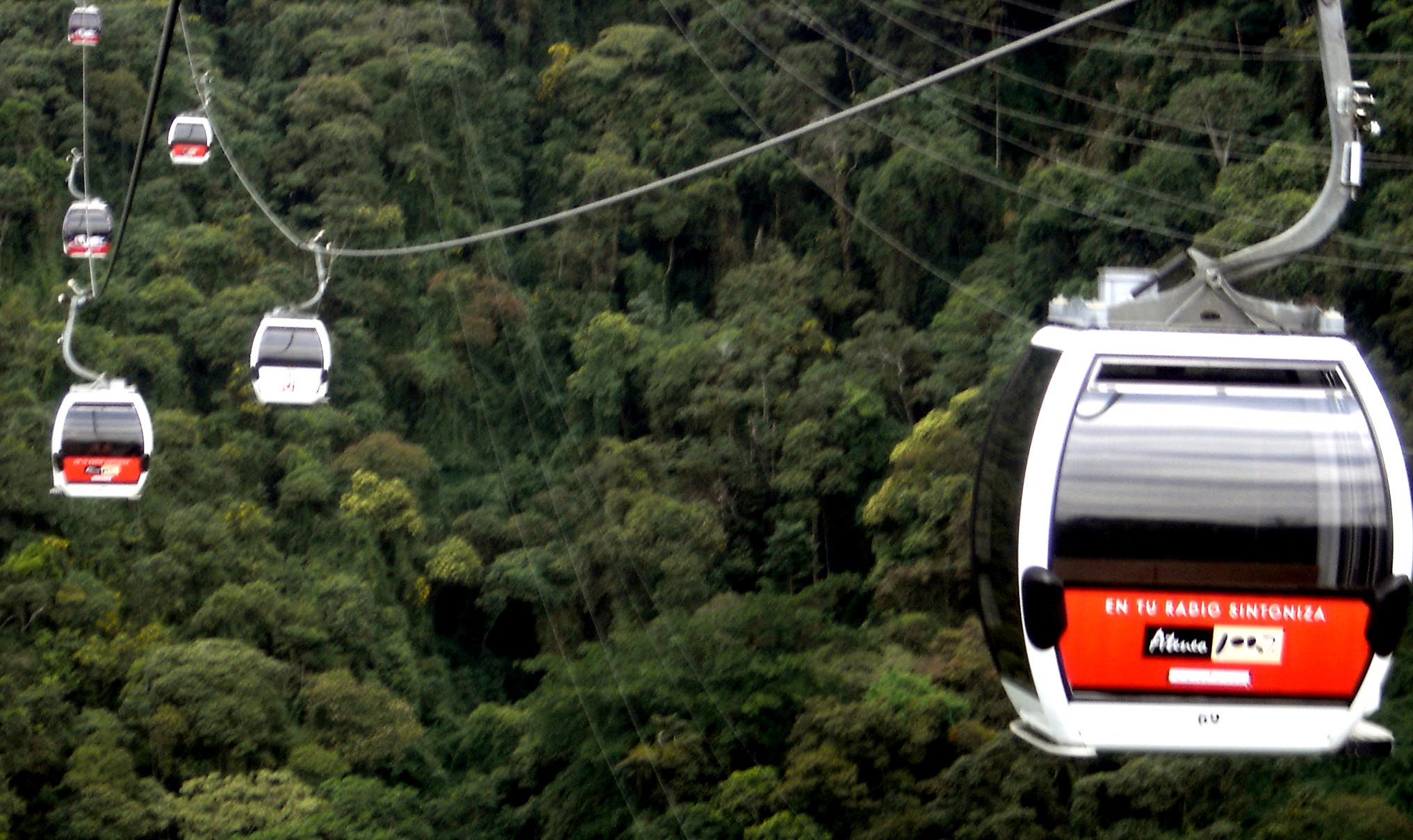
Caracas Aerial Tramway: Warairarepano

The Teleférico de Caracas is a gondola lift that ascends El Ávila Mountain within El Ávila National Park, in Caracas, Venezuela.

== History ==
It was inaugurated on December 2, 1955, by President Marcos Pérez Jiménez. It remained open until the end of the 1970s. A series of fruitless attempts to reopen it in 1986, 1988, and 1990 each ended in closing it. In 2000, the national government gave a concession to the Inversora Turística Caracas´Company, which was to reopen the tramway to coincide with rebuilding the Humboldt Hotel and the Magic Park of Avila [Parque Mágico Avila] (El Ávila National Park).

In 2000, the reconstruction of the cableway system began, as well as one of the stations, and the cable cars are now operating. Now there are more than 70 tram cars which can travel 3.5 km in 15 minutes approximately. As of 3 January 2024, the cost for a round trip ride is between US$12 (for Venezuelans) and US$30 (for non-Venezuelans). In August 2007, the concession was revoked and the park is once again in the hands of the federal government. In October 2007, it was renamed "Waraira Repano”." The restoration of the mid-century modern hotel lasted 13 years, and was reopened in 2018.

The park area at the top of the mountain is a wide walkway along the ridgeline. Several sellers have set up food or handicraft kiosks. There is also a restaurant and ice skating rink, an enormous Venezuelan flag waving in the breeze, and the Bauhaus influenced Humboldt Hotel. Often the top of the mountain has clouds drifting through it, obscuring the view. It is several degrees cooler than Caracas or the coast. When the clouds clear, the city of Caracas can be seen on one side and the coastline on the other side.

== System ==
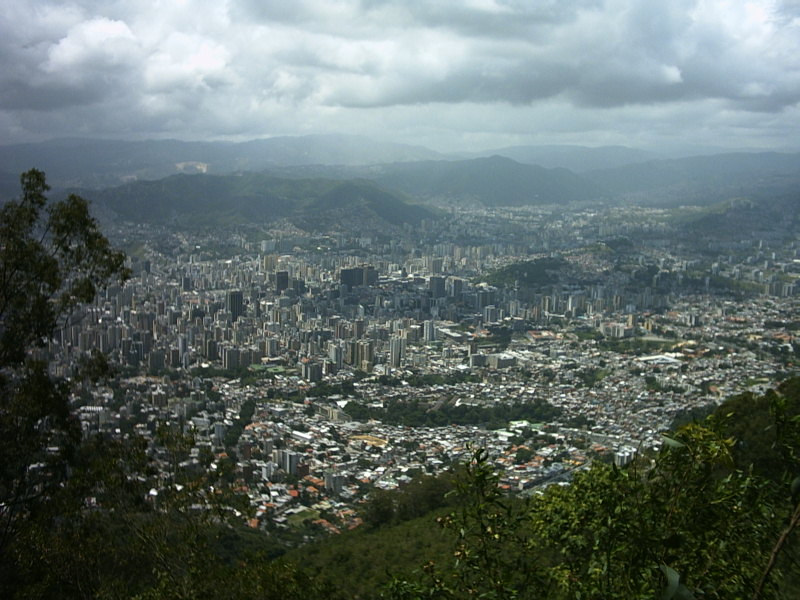
View from Avila

The original system had four stations and two sections, the first one between the city of Caracas (altitude 1,000m), and the top of Avila hill (2,100m), that also took passengers down to the Humboldt Hotel and the second section left of the Avila that passed over the town of Galipán and finished in El Cojo station in Macuto, although the Vargas Station (Estado Vargas) fell into disuse and became obsolete.

The operating company, before the concession was revoked, reconstructed all of the first section (Maripérez - Ávila). The state then took control of the system and announced plans to modernize further the second section of the system; a task unfinished by the previous contractor because of the cancellation of that concession. At the beginning of 2008, the state put its plan into action and began the reconstruction of the second cableway system from Galipán to El Cojo, but to this day no construction has started on the site.

== See also ==
- Metrocable de Caracas
- Venezuelan Coastal Range
