= Asociación de Scouts de Venezuela =

National Scouting association of Venezuela

- Location: Av. Juan Germán Roscio, San Bernardino, Caracas 1010, D.F.
- Country: Venezuela
- Founded: 1913
- Membership: 14,801
- Affiliation: World Organization of the Scout Movement
- Website www.scoutsvenezuela.org.ve

Logo of Asociación de Scouts de Venezuela

The Asociación de Scouts de Venezuela (ASV, Scout Association of Venezuela) is the national Scouting association of Venezuela. Founded in 1913, the ASV contributes to the integral development of young people through a non-formal education system as set out by the parameters of Robert Baden-Powell. Venezuela became a member of the World Organization of the Scout Movement in 1937. The ASV has 14,801 members as of 2011.

The Association is primarily concerned with nature conservation, organising activities such as clean-up campaigns, tree planting, and beautification projects. Other recreational activities that the ASV offer include hiking, camping, and climbing. The Scouts have also previously held rallies to raise awareness of drug abuse and drug trafficking.

== History ==
In August 1913, Ramón Ocando Pérez, formed the "Club Boy Scouts of Maracaibo" with the help of some friends. This was short-lived due to inconveniences. However, Mr. Ramón Ocando Pérez is considered the precursor of Scouting Venezuela.

Between 1914-1917, Ramón Ocando Pérez and English Scout Walter Raleigh Douglass organized the movement in the city of Maracaibo, in Zulia State, where they founded the "San Sebastian" Troop, the oldest troop in the country. "San Sebastian No. 1" had five patrols called wolves, foxes, ocelots, curlews, and coquivacoas. The fifth group, unaware of the animal naming tradition, chose to name themselves after Lake Maracaibo. The San Sebastian Troop was formed with an inaugural 42 Scouts on January 20th 1913, the day of St. Sebastian patron of the city of Maracaibo, and adopted a green color for their scarf to symbolise hope and nature.

1926 The Spanish Captain Perez Brihuela organized a troop of Boy Scouts in the German Catholic College of Valencia, Carabobo State. It is speculated that the Troop was short-lived due to a lack of knowledge of the true purposes of Scouting, by its founder.

1927 On 27 May constitutes Maracaibo "Association of Boy Scouts of Zulia".

1933-1934 In 1933, Henrique Sapene organized the Troop "St. George" in Caracas. Its success led to the subsequent founding of the Troop "San Carlos" by Enrique Tejera París. On 13 June of that year, with the signing of the "Federal Pact", the Federation of Boy Scouts of Venezuela was formed.

The first Constitution was adopted on 22 August 1934 in the National Assembly, headed by National Commissioner Henrique Sapene, Scoutmaster Marcel Granier Doyeux, Assistant Scoutmaster Federico Diaz Legorburu, and Enrique Tejera Paris as witness.

1935 Following the resignation of National Commissioner Henrique Sapene, the Federation had Enrique Tejera Paris and Federico Diaz Legorburu as Interim Commissioners. At the end of that year, the National Assembly of the Federation appointed Captain M. Santos Rausseo as new National Commissioner.

In the same year Enrique Tejera Paris was elected to the National Commissioner, and during his term the Venezuelan Catholic Church recognized the Federation of Boy Scouts (Scouts) of Venezuela as an organization, and the National Scout Camp-School "Smoke" was created in Encanto Park where the first National Forest badge workshop was held.

1936-1938 Through the efforts of Dr. Enrique Tejera G., Minister of Education for the year, General Eleazar López Contreras, President, included in its Programme for Government, support for the Boy Scouts (Official Gazette No. 18886 of 21 February 1936).

In August of that year a tour was made of the West of the Republic of Colombia (Cúcuta) that aimed to raise awareness of Scouting in that region. A group called the "Technical Circle of Scouting", whose activities were immediately extended to the cities of Maracaibo and Valencia, was established in Caracas in 1937.

The Technical Circle of Scouting (CTE) was founded with the primary intention of channeling resources and energies latent in the Federation, and to improve and expand Scouts Venezuela. From then until its dissolution in 1948, the CTE was a group dedicated to technical improvement.

In 1937 a Scout mission led by National Commissioner Cap. Rausseo M. Santos, attended the World Jamboree held in Vogelenzang, Netherlands, on behalf of the Federation of Boy Scouts (Scouts) in Venezuela. That same year, the Federation requested and obtained registration from the World Scout Conference, becoming one of the members of the World Organization of the Scout Movement (WOSM).

In 1938, C.T.E. organized a course for Heads of Unit Potrerito, Carrizales, Edo. Miranda, which can be considered the first formal training course conducted in a Field-School in the country.

1940-1941 In late 1940, for health reasons, Rausseo, the National Commissioner, resigned and died soon after. In an extraordinary National Assembly, Prof. Armando Alvarez de Lugo was appointed Acting National Commissioner.

1942 In August 1942 the first National Jamboree (National Patrol Camp) was held in the city of Maracaibo, which was attended by Scouts from throughout Venezuela.

1943-1945 'In 1943 and 1944 the Regional Conference of Heads were held in Barquisimeto and Valencia. On 7 September 1945 the National Assembly amended the Constitution, changing the designation of National Chief Scout Commissioner for Venezuela, choosing Federico Diaz Legorburu as First Chief Scout. In 1945 the statutes were reformed again (which were renamed by - Policy, Organization and Rules) and the name Scout Association of Venezuela adopted.

1946 At the level of the Americas, Venezuelan Scouting was involved from the first steps, in the creation of the Interamerican Council of Scouting. Four Venezuelan officials: Federico Diaz Legorburu, Gustavo J. Vollmer, Luis Esteban Palacios, and Rolando Gonzalez Echemendía have served as President of that body. Since its founding in 1946, the CIE has always had in its directive members of the Association.

In 1961 Venezuela was home to the Fifth Interamerican Scout Conference, which took place at the Hotel Humboldt in Caracas. By that time Federico Diaz Legorburu was Chairman of CIE. Dr. Gustavo J. Vollmer served as President of the National Council of the Asociación de Scouts de Venezuela, President of the Interamerican Regional Scout Council, and as a member of the World Scout Committee of the World Organization of the Scout Movement from 1963 to 1969 and again from 1973 to 1979 .

In 1981, a reform to unite the positions of chairman and chief scout was brought forward, and created three main focus areas: education and method, operations, and finance, which continue to maintain their relevance.

In 1997, female branches were created within the Scout Association and new uniform plans were introduced.

== Program and ideals ==
Program

All sections are coeducational. Association members use wine-red neckerchiefs when attending international events. The motto and national emblem of the ASV set out the identity and values of Venezuelan Scouting: High Ideals, Elevation of Sights, Justice, Loyalty and Perseverance.

Ideals

- Lobatos-Lobeznas/Cubs- 7 to 11
- Scouts-ages 11 to 16
- Rovers-ages 16 to 21

== Publications ==
- "Manual El Camino Hacia los Bosques" Scout Association of Venezuela. 1973

== See also ==
- Asociación de Guías Scouts de Venezuela
