= Gottfried Knoche =

German doctor and surgeon

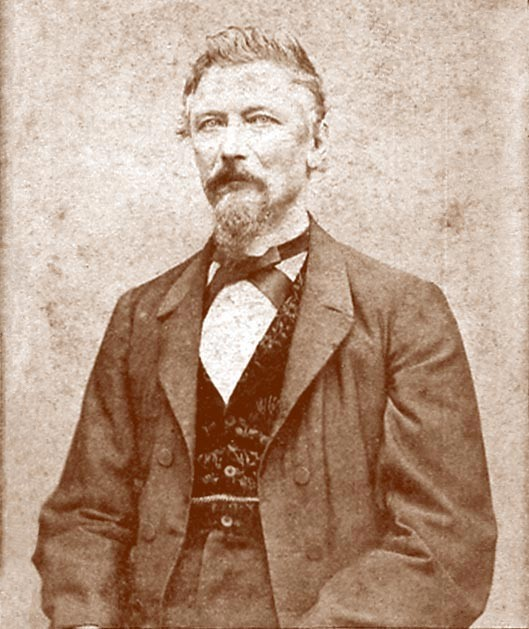
- (date unknown)
- Born: August Gottfried Knoche; March 17, 1813; Halberstadt, Germany
- Died: January 2, 1901 (aged 87)
- Education: University of Freiburg
- Occupations: Doctor; Surgeon

August Gottfried Knoche (17 March 1813, Halberstadt – 2 January 1901, near La Guaira) was a German doctor and surgeon. He is best known for inventing an embalming fluid that was used to mummify dozens of corpses (including his own) at his laboratory in Venezuela.

== Biography ==
In 1837, he studied at the University of Freiburg and worked in the university's hospital. Three years later, he went to Venezuela and settled in La Guaira, where he tended to the large number of German emigrants who were farming nearby along the litoral. Once he was fully established there, he brought his wife and daughter from Germany, putting them to work as his nurse and assistant.

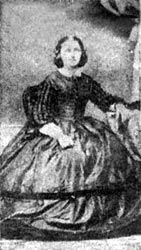
Knoche's daughter, Anna.

He was known as a charitable man, who treated poor patients without charge, and was considered fearless in his fight against a cholera epidemic that was ravaging the area. In 1845, his doctor's credentials were certified locally, by the Universidad Central de Venezuela. He was also a nature lover, and went on many horseback excursions into the neighboring mountains. It was then that he decided to become a land owner, perhaps inspired by the small fincas from colonial days that dotted the area. The "Hacienda Buena Vista" would later become the site of his laboratory and family mausoleum.

From 1854 to 1856, he helped reestablish the old "Hospital San Juan de Dios". Later, during the Federal War, when many bodies were brought from the battlefields, he became fascinated with the process of decomposition and began experimenting on unclaimed corpses, which he took on muleback to his laboratory at Buena Vista. Soon, he devised a fluid that could be injected into the veins and preserve the cadaver without having to remove the organs.

Many rumors about his experiments circulated, giving rise to a popular apocryphal anecdote: The family of Tomás Lander, a journalist and politician, heard about his fluid and asked him to mummify Lander. After finishing the process, with the corpse elegantly dressed and groomed, he placed it at a desk in the entryway of his (Lander's) house, where it remained for forty years, until President Antonio Guzmán Blanco had it interred on behalf of Lander's descendants. In fact, Lander died in 1845, long before Knoche is believed to have developed his formula. It may be a humorous way of explaining why Lander's body was not placed in the National Pantheon until 1884, or a sly commentary on his character by people who believed that he was nothing more than an "armchair revolutionary". The story could have been inspired by the well-known fate of Jeremy Bentham's corpse.

In preparation for Knoche's own death, he concocted the proper dosage and entrusted it to his nurse (and possibly cousin) Amalie Weismann. She carried out this commission faithfully, and remained at Buena Vista until her death in 1926 at the age of eighty-eight when, in accordance with her wishes, she was also placed in the mausoleum. As she became more reclusive, locals began to refer to her as the "Witch of Ávila" and she was said to have the power to talk to birds.

== Legacy ==
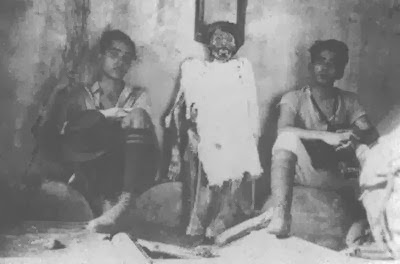
Local guides with the mummy of José Perez, a soldier who may have been Knoche's first successful mummification. It was originally set up as a "guard" for his compound.

His fluid is believed to have been based on an aluminum chloride compound, but the complete formula has never been discovered, if in fact it was ever written down. The "Hacienda Buena Vista" is in ruins. The mausoleum was heavily vandalized and has been reconstructed. In addition to Knoche, it held the remains of his daughter Anna (1840–1879), her husband Heinrich Müller (1822–1881) and Knoche's brother Wilhelm (1817–1874). His wife returned to Germany because she didn't like the isolation or the weather at the hacienda, and the fate of Anna's son, Oswald, is unknown. When the mausoleum was first visited by an exploratory team in 1929, the bodies had been removed from their containers and strewn about. Originally, it is said, mummified dogs served as the mausoleum's "guardians". Over the years, many medical students have visited there, attempting to discover the fluid's formula. The hacienda and mausoleum are located in what is now El Ávila National Park.

Gottfried Knoche is featured in the 2025 video game Oblitus mortis.
