= El Ávila National Park =

Venezuelan national park

- IUCN category II (national park)
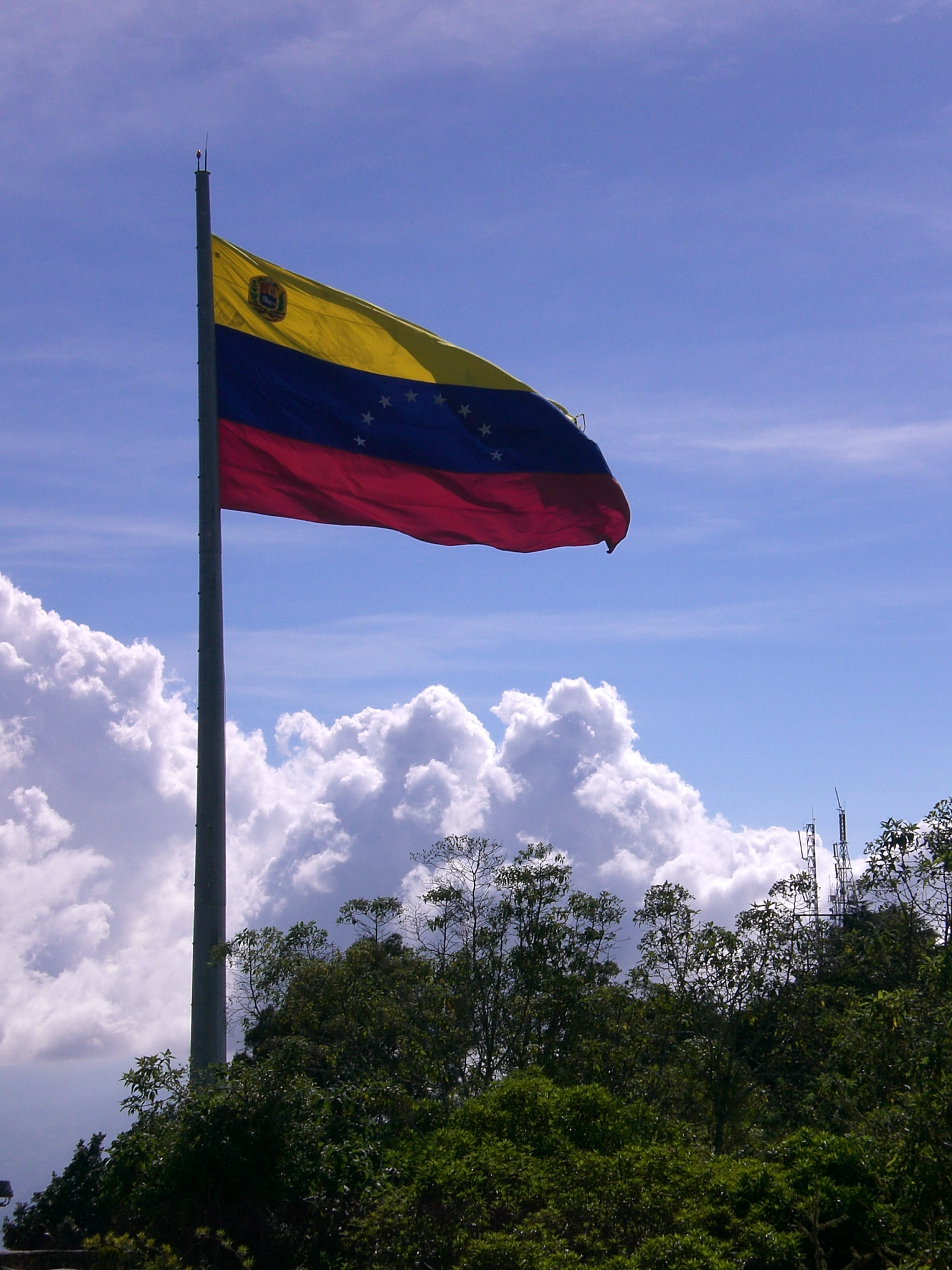

- Location within Venezuela
- Coordinates: 10°32′N 66°52′W
- Area: 81,900 ha (316 sq mi)
- Established: 12 December 1958
- Governing body: INPARQUES

Cerro El Ávila

Highest point
- Elevation: 2,765 m (9,072 ft)
- Coordinates: 10°32′N 66°52′W

Geography
- Location: Caracas, Venezuela
- Parent range: Cordillera de la Costa

The Ávila National Park, officially known as Waraira Repano National Park for its indigenous Cariban name, protects part of the Cordillera de la Costa Central mountain range, in the coastal region of central-northern Venezuela. The area's highest elevation is Pico Naiguatá, at 2,765 meters (9,072 ft) above sea level.

== Culture & traditions ==
El Ávila is known as "el pulmón de la ciudad", the lungs of the city, since it serves many different functions for residents of Caracas, the most basic of these being navigation: the peak of El Ávila marks the north of the city. It is home to the longest cable car ride in the world, as well as activities like running, biking, rock climbing, camping, and zip-lining.

The Hotel Humboldt as well as many restaurants, including La Chivera, Casa Pakea, El Jardín de Luna, Le Galipanier, Granja Natalia and Tarahumara, are all nestled in the mountain's hills. Every December, the "Cruz de Navidad" is illuminated, a large crucifix high up in the mountain that faces the city and can be seen from very far distances.

A common expression amongst Caracas city-dwellers to describe the change in seasons is "Pacheco has arrived", which is a reference to the legend of Pacheco the flower-picker. He was known to be a resident of el Galipán, a region in el Ávila close to the coast that tended to mark the border between the coast's chilly weather and that of the hot, dry weather of the rest of the country.

== History ==
El Ávila was declared a park in 1958, fulfilling an interest in its protection that had been prevalent since the 19th century. With its creation came the protection of the forested mountains that surround Caracas, the capital of Venezuela. These mountains now serve as both a recreational area and as a buffer to pollution and urban expansion.

El Ávila has always been an important resource for the inhabitants of Caracas, who have used the area for a variety of activities, some of which have threatened its conservation. A hotel and a cable car, which climbs to the highest point at 2,135 meters (7,005 ft) above sea level and drops down the other side to the city of Macuto, were opened in 1956. After being out of service for 20 years, this cable car was reopened in February 2002.

== Biodiversity ==
This park has a high diversity of fauna and flora. More than 100 butterfly species, approximately 120 mammal species, 20 amphibians, 30 reptiles and 500 bird species (36% of Venezuela avifauna) have been documented. Nine bird species are endemic to Venezuela and three threatened bird species live in this park; one of the most coloured bird specimen in this park is the querrequerre (Cyanocorax yncas). More than 1,800 plant species from diverse taxonomic groups can be observed. Several of these plants are endemic to the Cordillera de la Costa mountain range with some endemic to the park itself.

== Vegetation ==
The vegetation is of mountain forest, with variations that is distributed according to the height. Between sea level and 200 or 300 meters (and even higher up in the orientation of relief) is the xeric forest, where prevail species like cují (Prosopis juliflora). Between 800–1500 m ombrophile sub-evergreen forest is characterized by 2-3 arboreal strata and relatively dense undergrowth is located. Among the 1,200 - 3 tree storeys and undergrowth well developed - 2,200 masl ombrophile evergreen forest with 2 stands.

In these forests, species of the orchids, ferns, bromeliads, aroids families abound, and endemic species of the Sapindaceae, Melastomataceae, Rubiaceae, Myrtaceae families and arborescent ferns and palms (Ceroxylon ceriferum) have been reported. These forests have the only extant natural population of the critically endangered Venezuelan walnut tree (Juglans venezuelensis). Presents anthropogenic savannas where predominate species like melao capim (Melinis minutiflora), the bambusillo (Arthrostylidium venezuelae), yellow tara (Oyedaea verbesinoides) and incense (Espeletia neriifolia).

In the upper regions of the Silla of Caracas and the Pico Naiguatá is a characteristic vegetation of coastal bush subpáramo, consisting of open shrub of 1–3 m tall with a herbaceous relatively well developed, being the most characteristic species incense or frailejón tree (Libanothamnus nerufolius), Spanish flag (Castilleja fissifolia) and false frailejón (Liabum megacephalum).

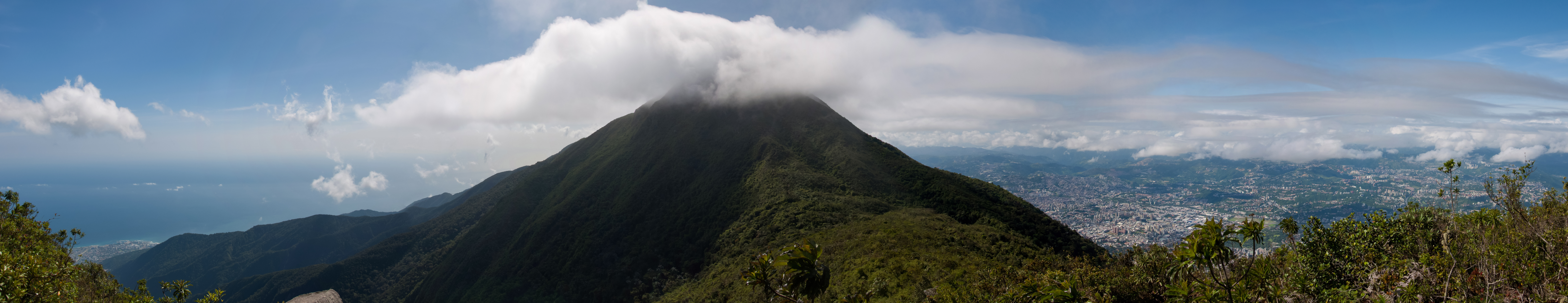
A panoramic view towards Caracas, looking at Pico Oriental. Part of La Guaira can be seen to the left, and the Caracas valley to the right.

== Threats ==
El Ávila can be classified as vulnerable because there is a risk that the diverse threats it faces will increasingly erode its biodiversity unless in the near future constant monitoring occurs. The most immediate threats to the park, forest fires and illegal settlements, are located primarily near Caracas. The concentration of resources and vigilance in the areas closest to the city has resulted in more problems on the more isolated northern slope and the eastern sector of El Ávila. These areas suffer from a lack of signs, infrastructure and vigilance. Other threats include the presence of exotic plants, the Caracas Aerial Tramway, the Hotel Humboldt and poaching.

== Geography ==
El Ávila National Park is located along the central stretch of the Cordillera de la Costa, at 10° 32' latitude north and between 66° 12' and 67° 01' longitude west (see map). It covers the mountainous regions between the Caribbean Sea and the valleys of Caracas, Guatire, Guarenas and Barlovento. The park contains part of the following states: Vargas (northern slope), Capital District (southern and western slope) and Miranda (eastern slope).

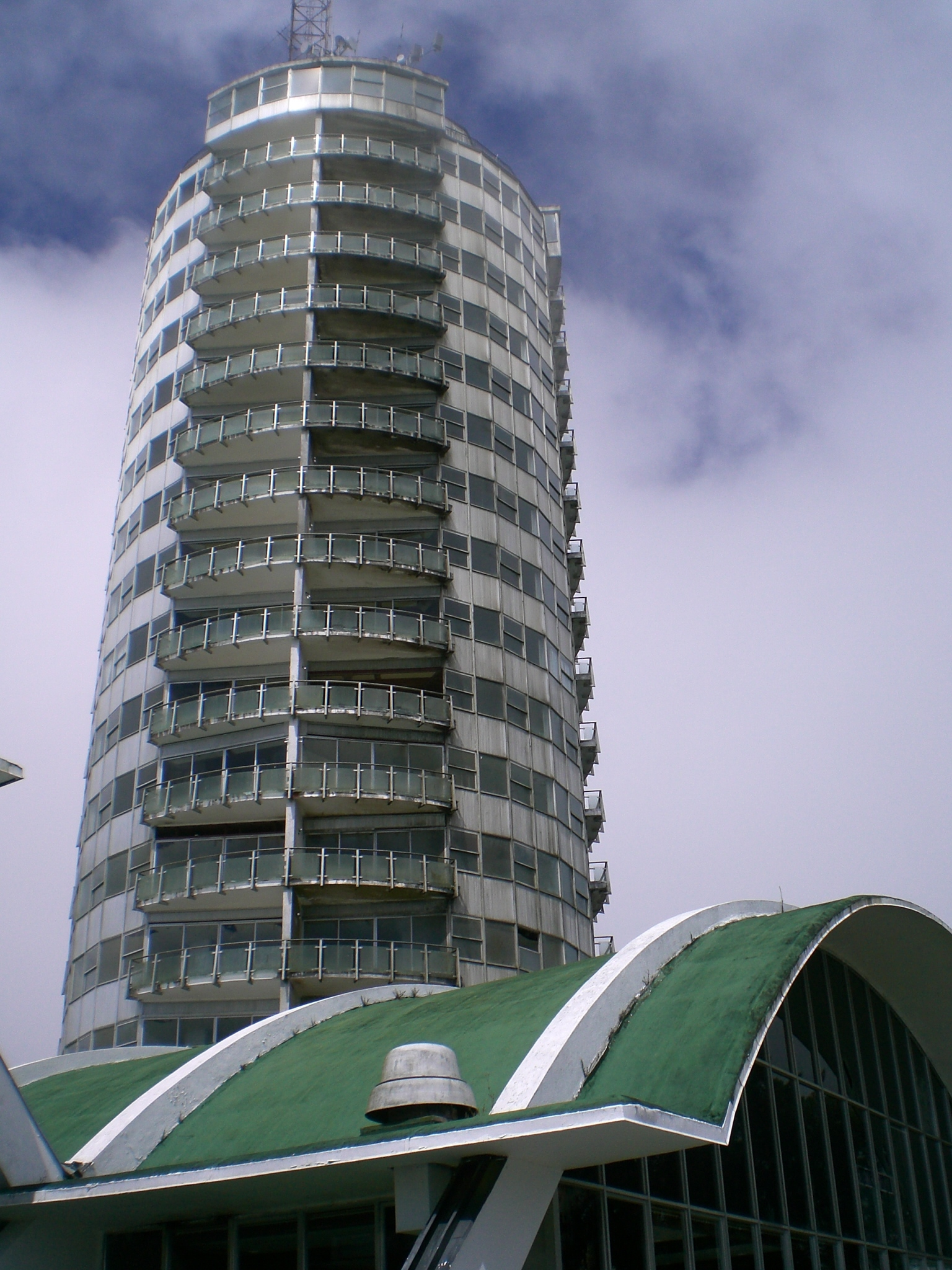
Hotel Humboldt, founded in 1956 on the top of the Cerro El Ávila (2,105 m above the city of Caracas), Venezuela

The National Park is named for the Cerro El Ávila (Mountain El Ávila), usually just referred to as "El Ávila", which reaches 2,740 meters (8,990 ft) above sea level. This mountain rises north of the capital Caracas located in a narrow valley 950 meters (3,120 ft) above sea level and separates the city from the Caribbean Sea. The mountain is accessible by cable car (teleferico), by off-road vehicle, and on foot. In addition to the scenery, one may visit the hacienda, laboratory and mausoleum of Gottfried Knoche; a German-born doctor who was notorious for his experiments in mummification. They are accessible only by footpath.

The park follows a mountain range 80 kilometers (50 mi) long and approximately 16 km wide. It contains over 81,800 hectares (202,000 acres), encompassing a wide variety of ecosystems that vary along the altitude gradient from 120 to 2,765 meters (394 to 9,072 ft) above sea level at Naiguatá peak. In the lower areas of the northern side, the vegetation is mainly xerophytes, represented by a variety of cacti, shrubs and spiny species. From 300 to 600 meters (980 to 1,970 ft), semi-deciduous forests dominate. From 600 to 800 meters (2,000 to 2,600 ft) the seasonal semi-deciduous forests are common.

From 800 to 1,500 meters (2,600 to 4,900 ft) above sea level on the northern slope and from 1,200 to 1,600 meters (3,900 to 5,200 ft) on the southern slope, the forests are mainly sub-mountainous evergreen forests. Due to the constant condensation by the cooling of the air masses and the decrease of atmospheric pressure, cloud forest dominates between 1,500 and 2,200 meters (4,900 and 7,200 ft) above sea level. Finally, the lack of water at 2,200 meters (7,200 ft) and higher permits only sub-páramo vegetation. Beautiful forests grow along the numerous watercourses that flow on either side of the mountain.

The temperatures vary widely on El Ávila, with an average temperature of 13 °C (55 °F) in the lower sections of Caracas valley and 10 °C (50 °F) on Naiguatá peak, where the lowest temperature ever recorded was 2 °C (36 °F). The annual average rainfall fluctuates between 600 and 1,400 millimeters (24 and 55 in) and is influenced by orography, which explains why rain is more abundant on the northern slope where the mountain faces the trade winds.

== Trails ==
El Ávila National Park contains multiple trails, ranging from low-level routes to high technical complexity.

The most famous trails are: Los Venados, Sabas Nieves, El Vivero, Los Pinos, Papelón, Rancho Grande, Cachimbo, Miguel Delgado, Lomas del Cuño, El Paraíso, La Julia, Picacho, Piedra del Indio, Lagunazo, Pico Oriental, Pico Occidental, Cabeza de Elefante and Pico Naiguatá.

== Gallery ==
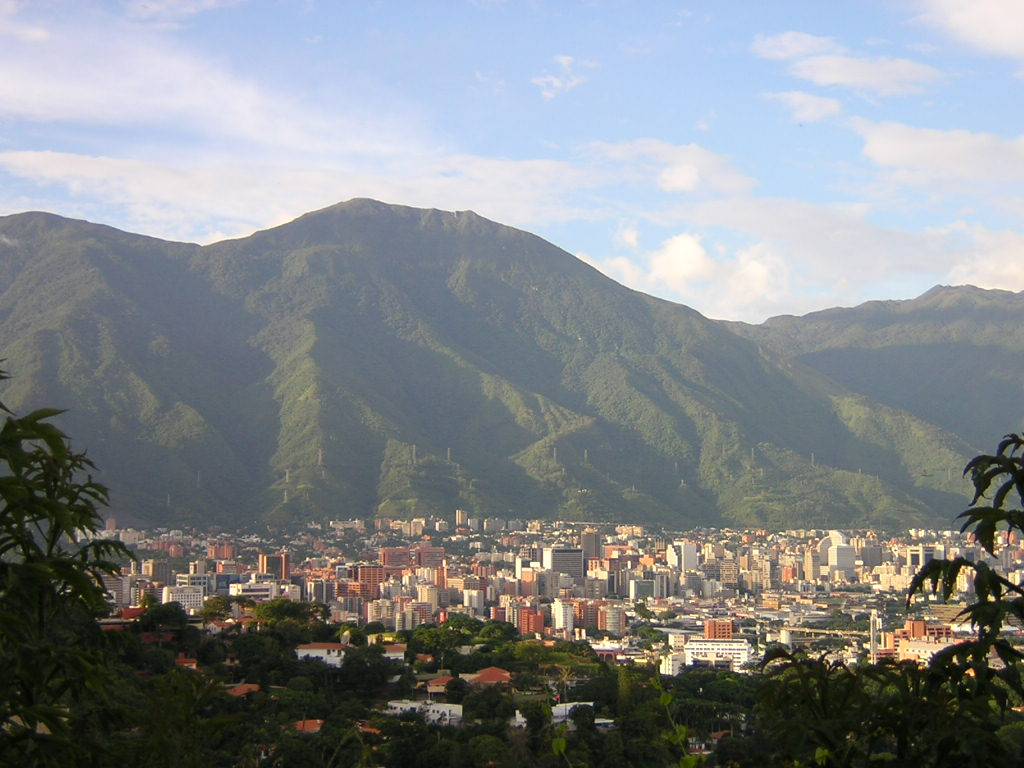
View of Caracas and Waraira Repano National Park

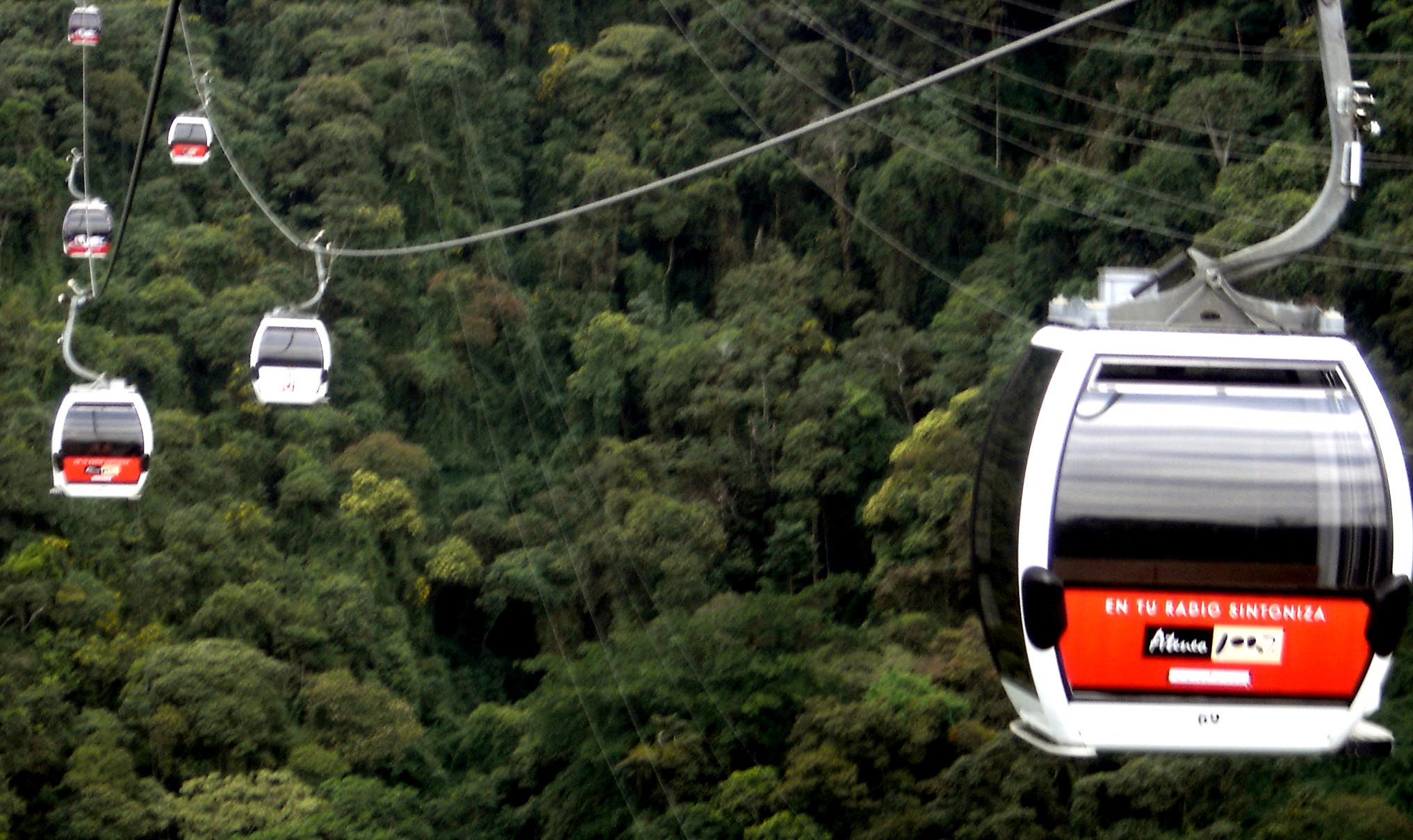
View of the El Ávila Cable Car starting from Caracas to Hotel Humboldt station

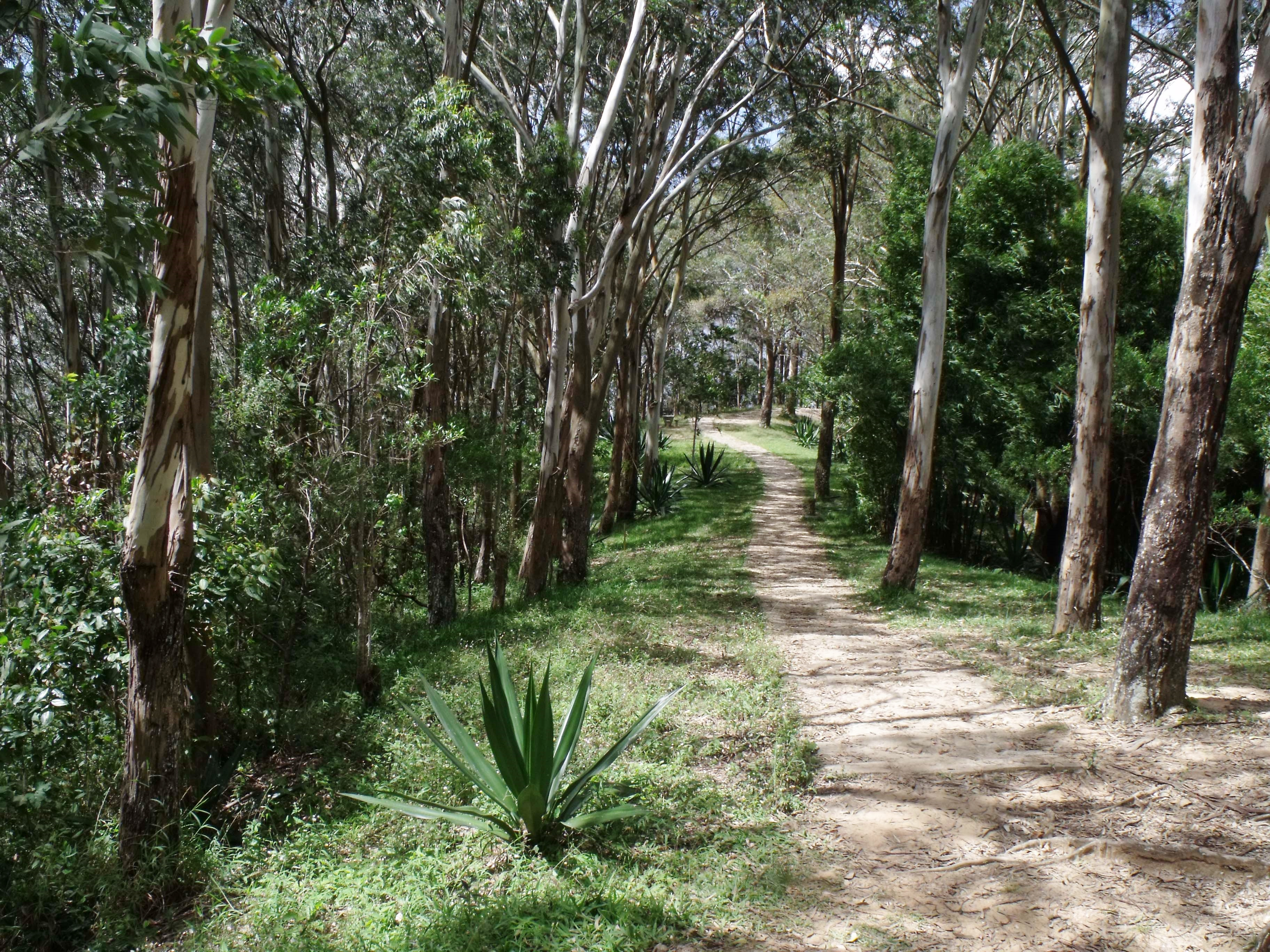
Way to Zamurera

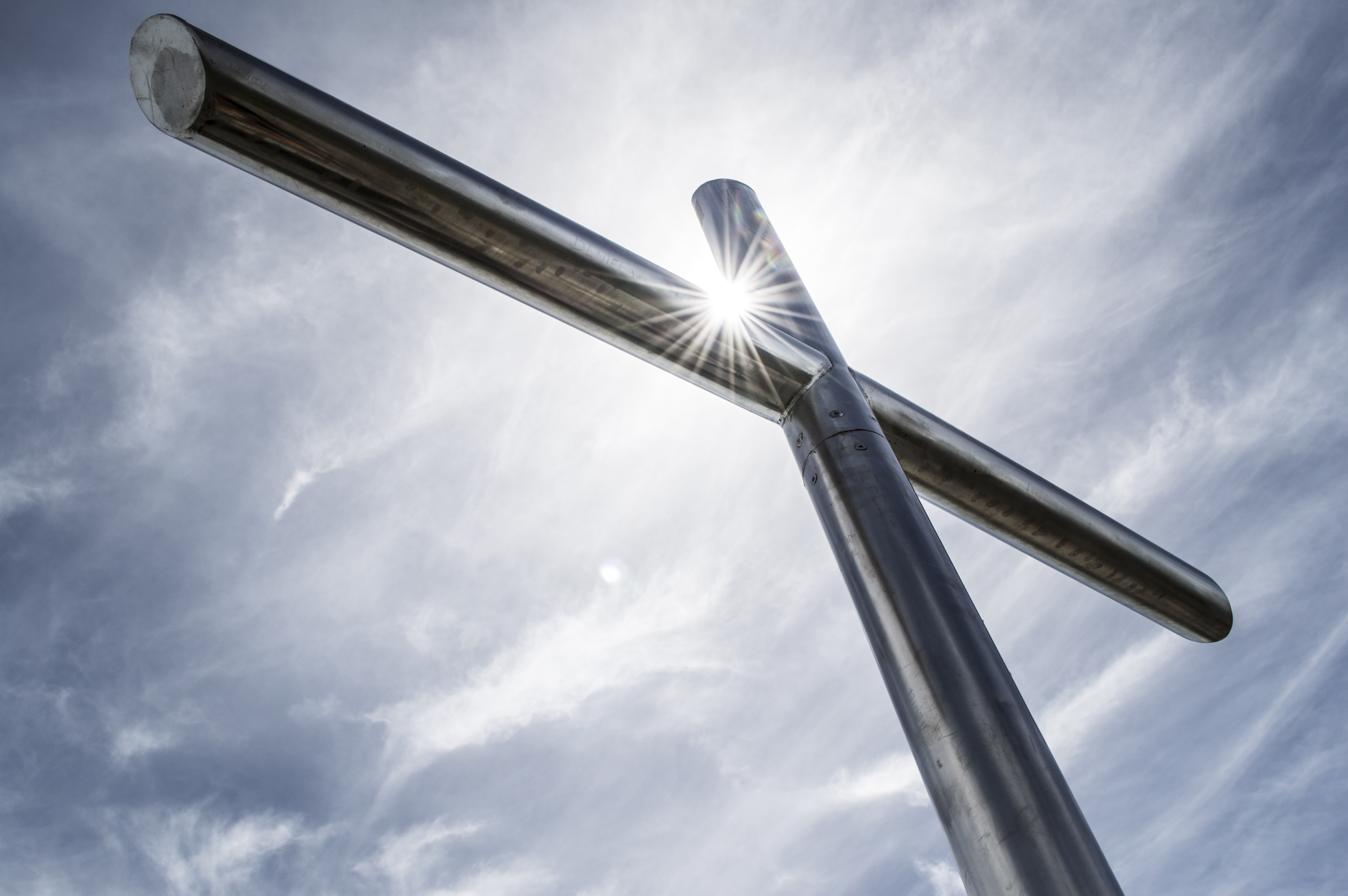
Naiguata Cross

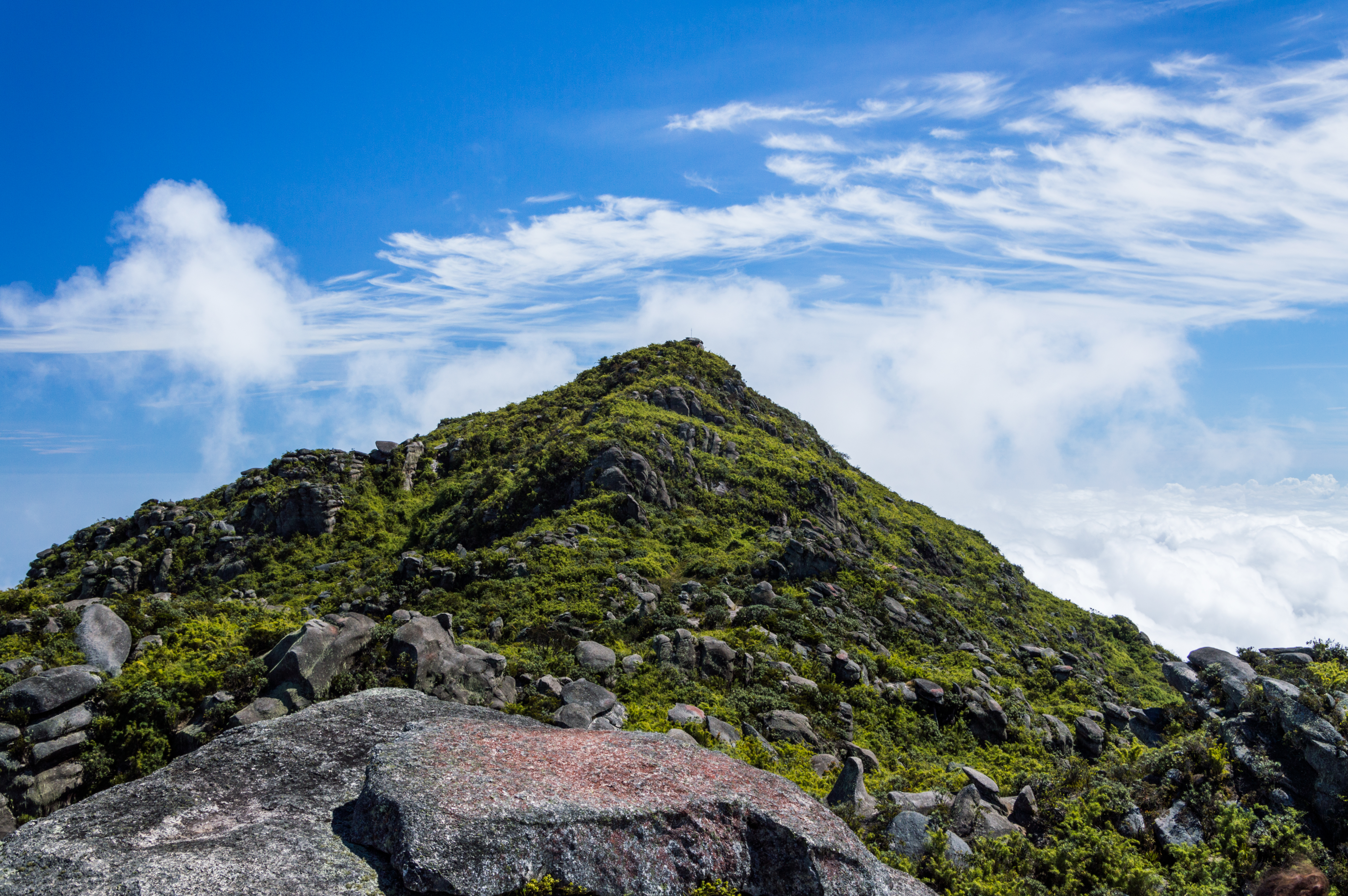
Naiguata Peak

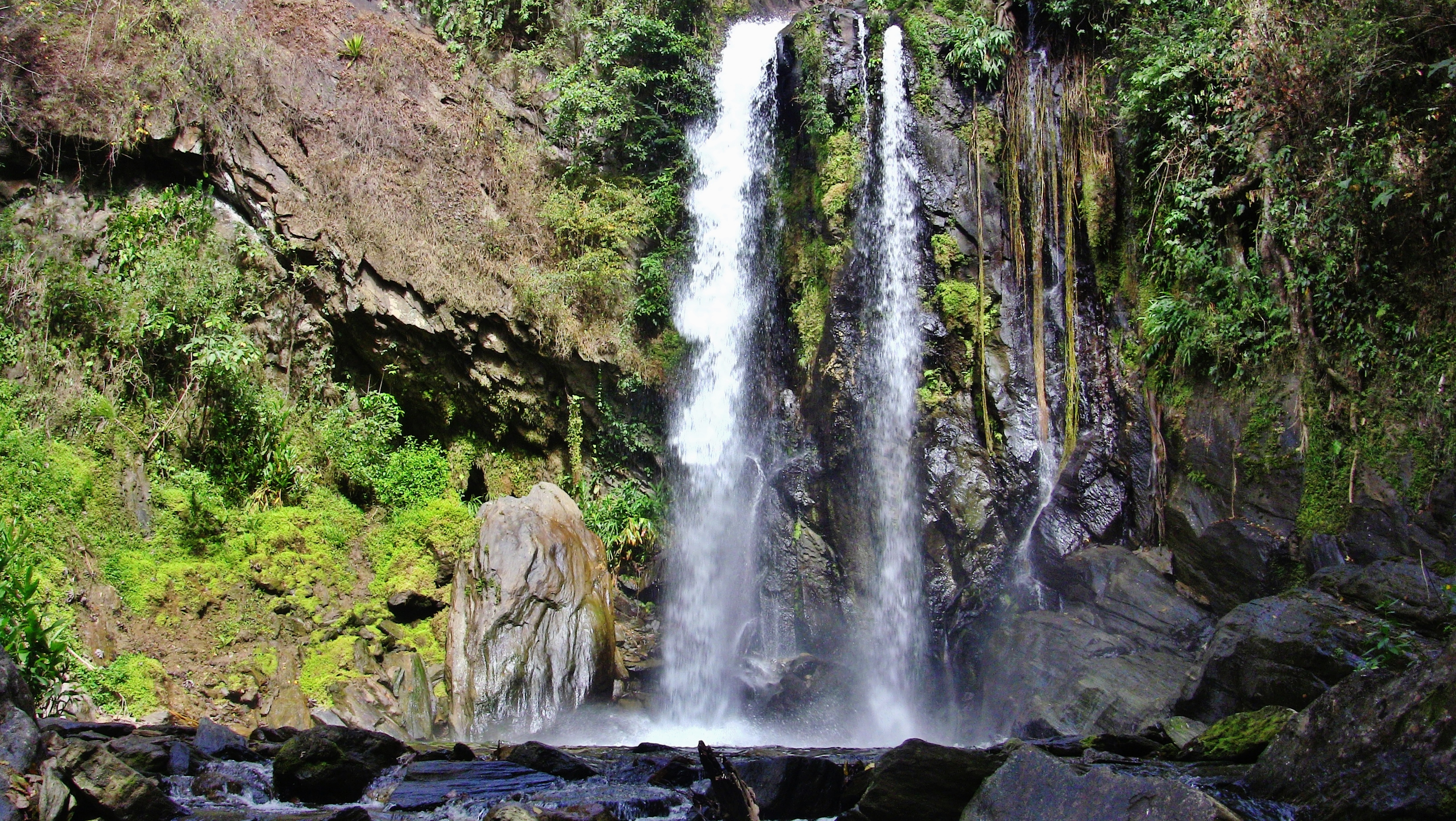
Paraiso Waterfall

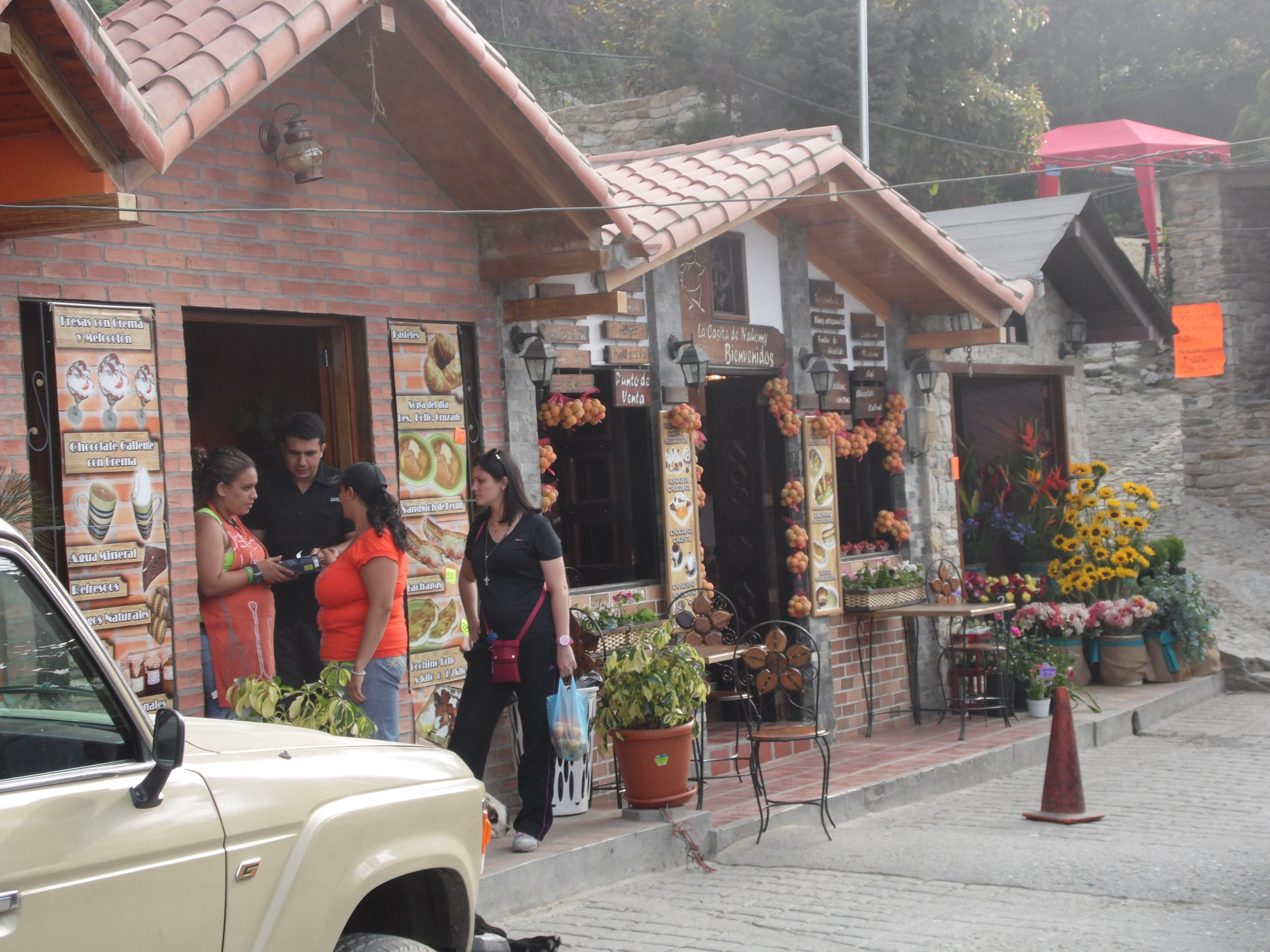
Galipan Village

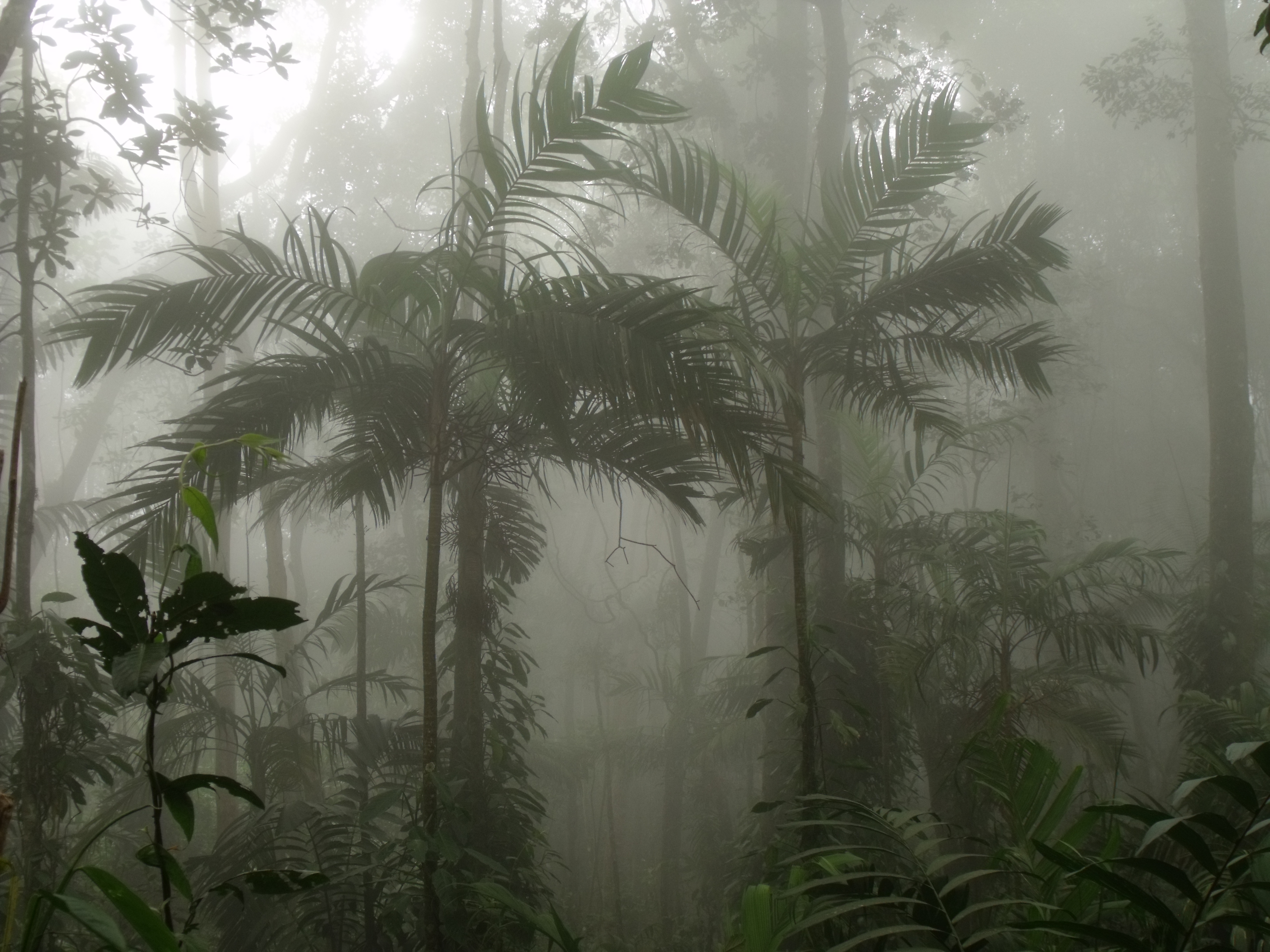
Cloudy forest

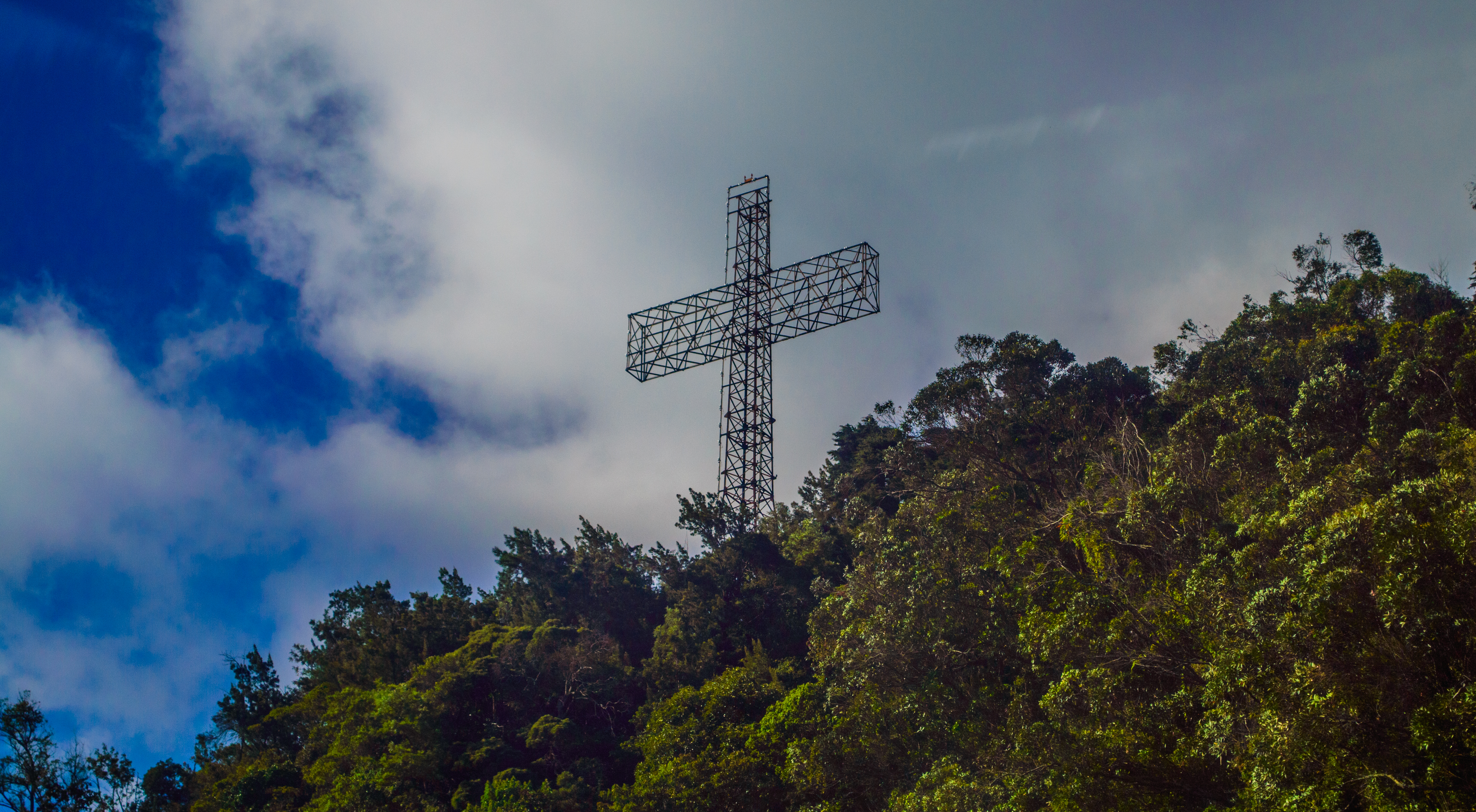
Cruz del Ávila

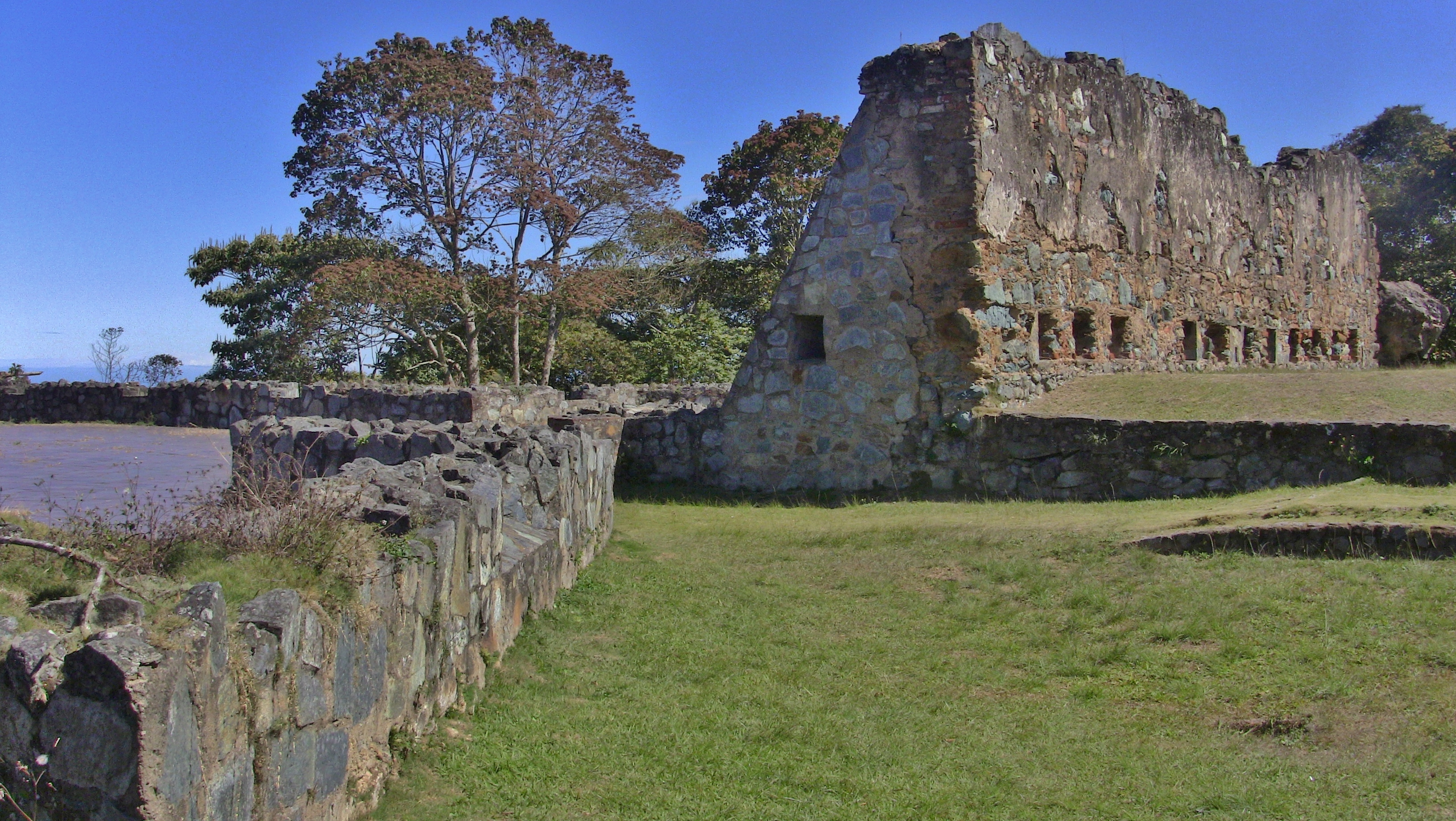
San Joaquín Fort

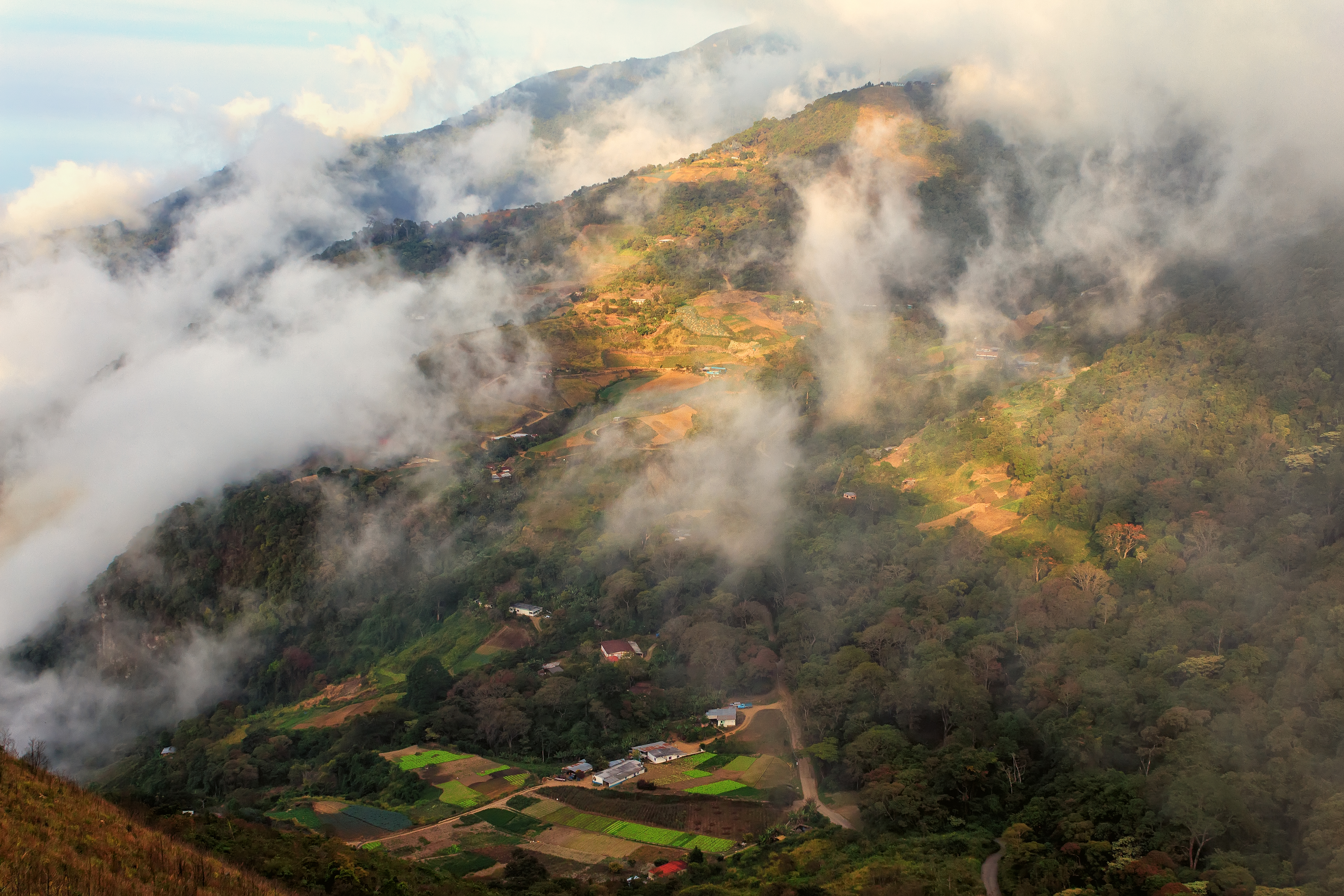
Hoyo de la Cumbre

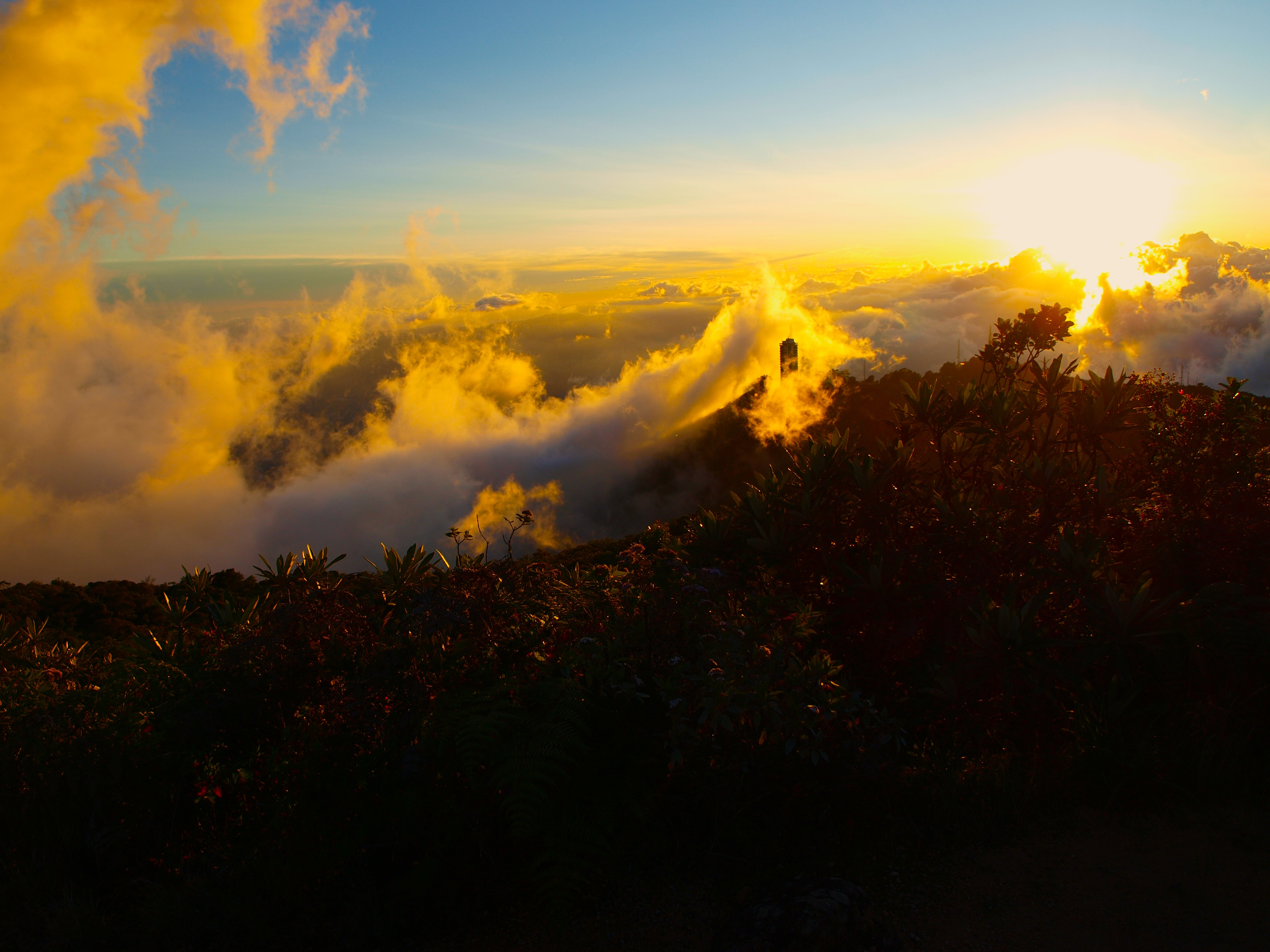
Sunset

== See also ==
- Teleférico de Caracas
