= Asociación de Guías Scouts de Venezuela =

Guide scout organization of Venezuela

- Girl Guide Association of Venezuela
- Country: Venezuela
- Founded: 1958
- Membership: 522
- Affiliation: World Association of Girl Guides and Girl Scouts
- Website http://www.guiasscoutsvenezuela.org.ve/

The Asociación de Guías Scouts de Venezuela (AGSV, Association of Guide Scouts of Venezuela) is the national Guiding organization of Venezuela. It serves 600 members (approximately). Founded in 1958, the girls-only organization became a full member of the World Association of Girl Guides and Girl Scouts in 1966.

== Program and ideals ==
The association is divided in four sections according to age:

- Margaritas - ages 4 to 5
- Haditas - ages 6 to 10
- Guías Menores - ages 10 to 14
- Guías Mayores - ages 15 to 20

=== Guide Promise ===
Yo prometo por mi honor, hacer cuanto de mí dependa,
para cumplir con mi deber hacia Dios y mi patria,
ser útil al prójimo en todo momento,
y obedecer la Ley Guía.

=== Guide Law ===
1. La Guía es leal y merece confianza.
2. La Guía es útil y ayuda a otros.
3. La Guía es comprensiva y generosa.
4. La Guía es hermana de toda muchacha Guía.
5. La Guía es cortés.
6. La Guía ve en la naturaleza la obra de Dios, y la protege.
7. La Guía sabe obedecer.
8. La Guía es valiente y animosa en sus dificultades.
9. La Guía es económica y ordenada.
10. La Guía es pura en lo que piensa, dice y hace.

== See also ==
- Asociación de Scouts de Venezuela

== Sources ==
- Zinguer, Bernardo (February 2021). Historia Del Movimiento Scout en el Táchira (in Spanish). San Cristóbal: Sigrid Márquez Poleo. ISBN 978-980-18-1686-7 – via Internet Archive.
