= Humboldt Hotel =

Hotel in Venezuela

Coordinates: 10.5421°N 66.8744°W

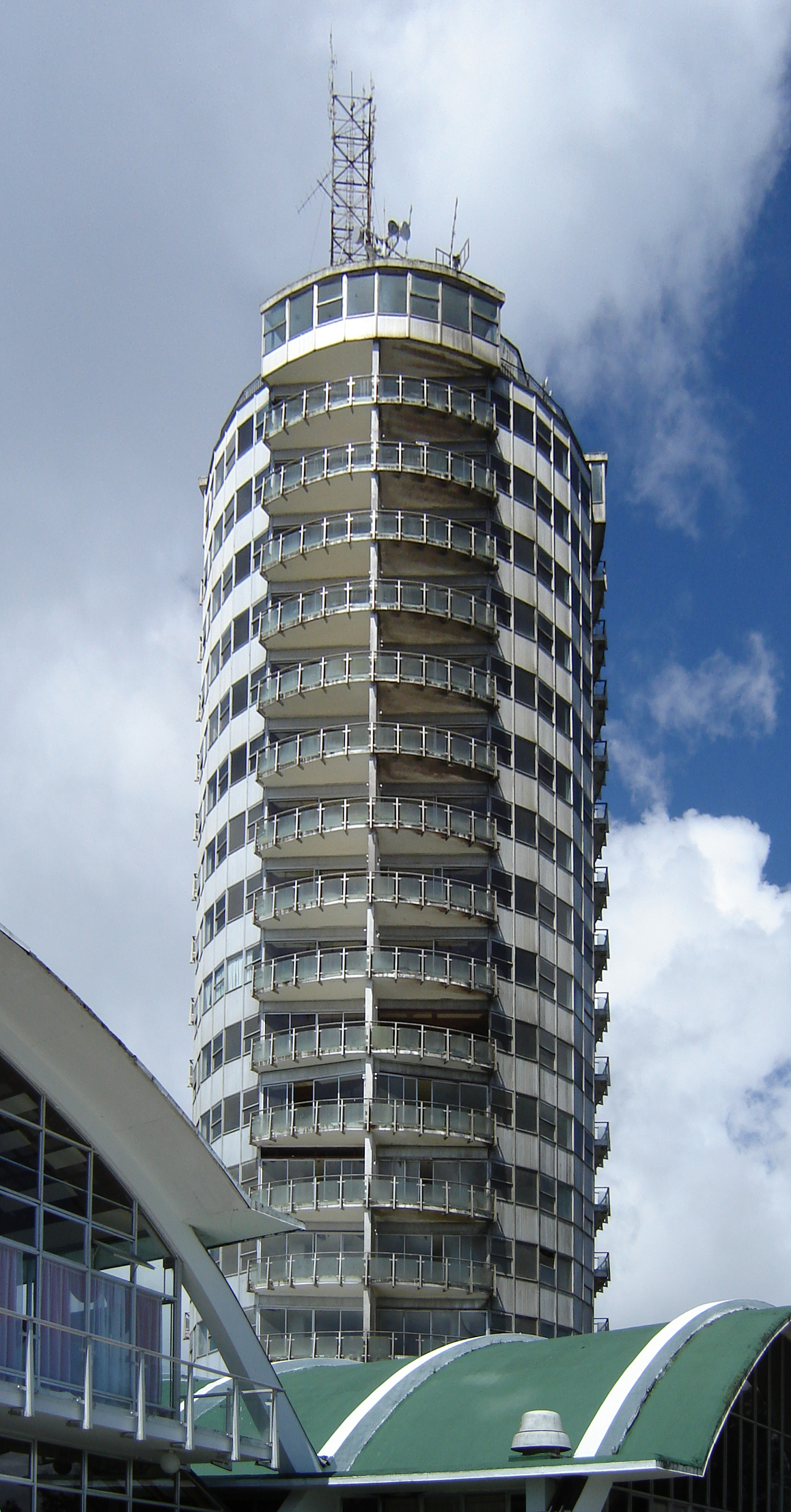
- Interactive map of the Humboldt Hotel area

General information
- Status: Completed
- Type: Hotel
- Location: Caracas, Venezuela
- Completed: 1956

Humboldt Hotel (Spanish: Hotel Humboldt) is a hotel located at the summit of Cerro Ávila in the city of Caracas, Venezuela. It was built between May and November 1956. The hotel is named after the German naturalist Alexander von Humboldt, who, in addition to undertaking numerous expeditions across Venezuela, explored the mountains and recorded his observations in writing.

== Description ==
The hotel was part of a plan to connect Caracas with the coast through a tourism and recreation complex that utilized the cable car as a means of transportation. The building stands at an elevation of 2,140 meters above sea level; its architecture features a cylindrical tower offering a 360° view. Standing 59.50 meters tall, it has 14 floors housing 70 suite-style rooms that offer an excellent view of the city. The building featured a dining room, an observation deck, and attached structures housing the hotel’s social areas: lounges, a living room, administrative offices, restrooms, and an indoor pool, as well as a private cable car for the exclusive use of hotel guests and their visitors. The glass and aluminum façade was used to help heat the building; it also allowed for routine cleaning maintenance to be performed from the inside through tilting windows.

== Restoration and reopening ==
In 2012, the Ministry of Popular Power for Tourism and the Ministry of Popular Power for the Office of the Presidency began a restoration programme for the Hotel Humboldt, with the aim of returning it to use for hotel and accommodation services. The works were led by the Venezuelan architect Gregory Vertullo, a specialist in the restoration of architectural monuments, together with Venezuelan and foreign professionals involved in the recovery of the building.

The first stage consisted of dismantling later additions made to the complex during previous administrations, including those associated with Sheraton in 1965, Inces and Corpoturismo. Part of the structure, including beams and columns, was then reinforced with carbon fibre to improve the building's durability.

The suites were refurbished and remodelled, while one room was kept in its original 1956 condition as a museum-style room for guided visits. Each remodelled room was fitted with a bathroom, shower with hydromassage column, sanitary fittings, cabinets and washbasins. The bathrooms were clad in marble throughout. Next to the bathroom is the bedroom, furnished with a queen-size bed, a dressing table with a mirror resembling the one used in 1956, and a chest of drawers serving as a base for a contemporary television. The curtains can be operated from the bedroom or from the adjoining small sitting area, which contains seating, a table for guests' computers and a hanging lamp.

Among the social areas in the low-rise body of the hotel is the main dining room, a space defined by segmented slabs and a large number of tables. Above them hang several sets of lamps that replicate the originals; these had to be designed in 3D and then manufactured in Caracas by a local artisan.

On the western side, the ground-floor bar was again provided with a service counter and an inclined window where the copper fireplace is located. The adjoining Salón Boîte was fully restored according to the original patterns for wall covering and carpet colour. On the northern side are the secondary kitchen and, beneath it, the pedestrian access area designed by Vertullo during the first stage of the works.

The ridge cable car, which originally served the hotel between 1956 and 1962, was proposed for reconstruction in a second phase of rehabilitation that would also include changes to the walkways and completion of works on the coastal cable-car line. Guests and other visitors would enter through the pedestrian-access hall, where the museum area is the focal point of the space. From there they would reach, by lift, the wet area intended for a new cable car, which could meanwhile be used for exhibitions. A short staircase dividing the level between the two slabs leads to the registration area, which was fully restored and includes a replica of the original hanging light fixture.

After registration, guests wait for their rooms in the main lobby, whose most notable feature is its vaulted ceiling of acoustic tiles held by a wood-and-steel framework. Beside it, a similar space functions as a hall, with a new bar located in the section where an exact replica of the seagull mural was reconstructed.

To the east, across the bridge connecting the lobby with the lift hall, are the souvenir shop and the breakfast dining room, which was originally conceived as a children's dining room. The latter provides access to the heated pool, which was adapted to operational regulations. The pool also has emergency devices so that, in the event of a fire, its water can be pumped to the area where it is needed. Hanging lamps and two original Buffalo-brand heaters are suspended over the pool to help keep the space warm. This area also contains two changing-room and bathroom areas with dressing rooms, showers, toilets, massage areas and a sauna. Above the women's bathroom area are the gymnasium and the door connecting with the main service kitchen.

On the northern side there is a small terrace fitted with railings and glass panels to protect visitors from strong winds. In the high-rise tower, two fully furnished rooms with their own kitchen services were arranged for parties and events. The first of these rooms is on the mezzanine, while the second is on the fifteenth floor and also serves as a lookout point with views of Caracas, Galipán and the Caribbean Sea.

All areas of the Hotel Humboldt were equipped with telephone data connections, Wi-Fi, security systems, and heating and air conditioning. Services made available to guests included a barber shop and hair salon, an automated teller machine, a currency-exchange office and a pharmacy, located below the registration area.

After its restoration, the hotel was reopened by the former President Nicolás Maduro on 4 May 2018. It was initially granted to businesspeople described in reports as licensees of the Marriott chain, through the company DHO 22 C.A.; according to later coverage, that arrangement was short-lived and the concession was subsequently assigned to another company, Hotel Humboldt 1956 C.A.

== See also ==
- El Ávila National Park
- Hotel Venetur Alba Caracas
- List of hotels in Venezuela
